= Richmond International High School and College =

Location
- 8671 Odlin Crescent; Richmond, British Columbia, V6X 1G1; Canada; 49.1814°N 123.1275°W

Information
- School type: High school
- Founded: 1991
- School board: School District 38 Richmond
- Language: English
- Website: www.rihsc.com (defunct)

Richmond International High School and College (RIHSC) was a private school in Richmond, British Columbia, founded in 1991. It was Japanese-owned, and catered primarily to foreign students. Canadian students attending majored in education. Fewer than 10 were accepted into the major per year. The school closed in 2005; a sister school in Tokyo remains in operation.

== Academic programs ==
The high school offered grades 10 to 12 under the B.C. curriculum.

The college offered:

- English language training
- A diploma in Computer Science
- A diploma in Hospitality and Tourism
- A diploma in Business Administration
- A Royal Roads University Bachelor of Commerce transfer program
- An Acadia University Bachelor of Computer Science transfer program
- A B.Ed. degree program

== Trivia ==
Scenes of the Fringe episodes "Jacksonville" and "Subject 13" were shot at the school.
