= Richmond, British Columbia =

City in British Columbia, Canada

Richmond
- City
- City of Richmond
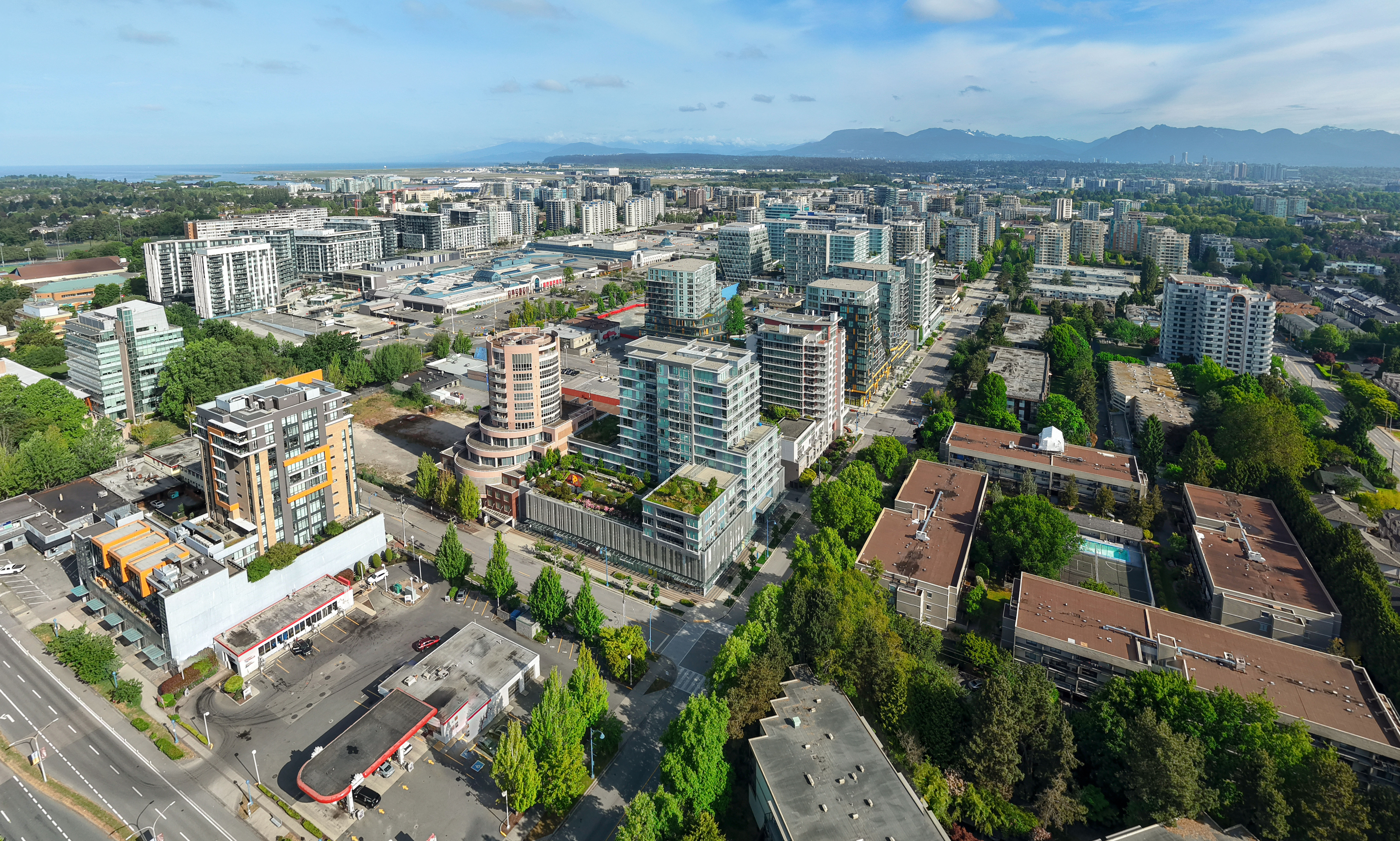
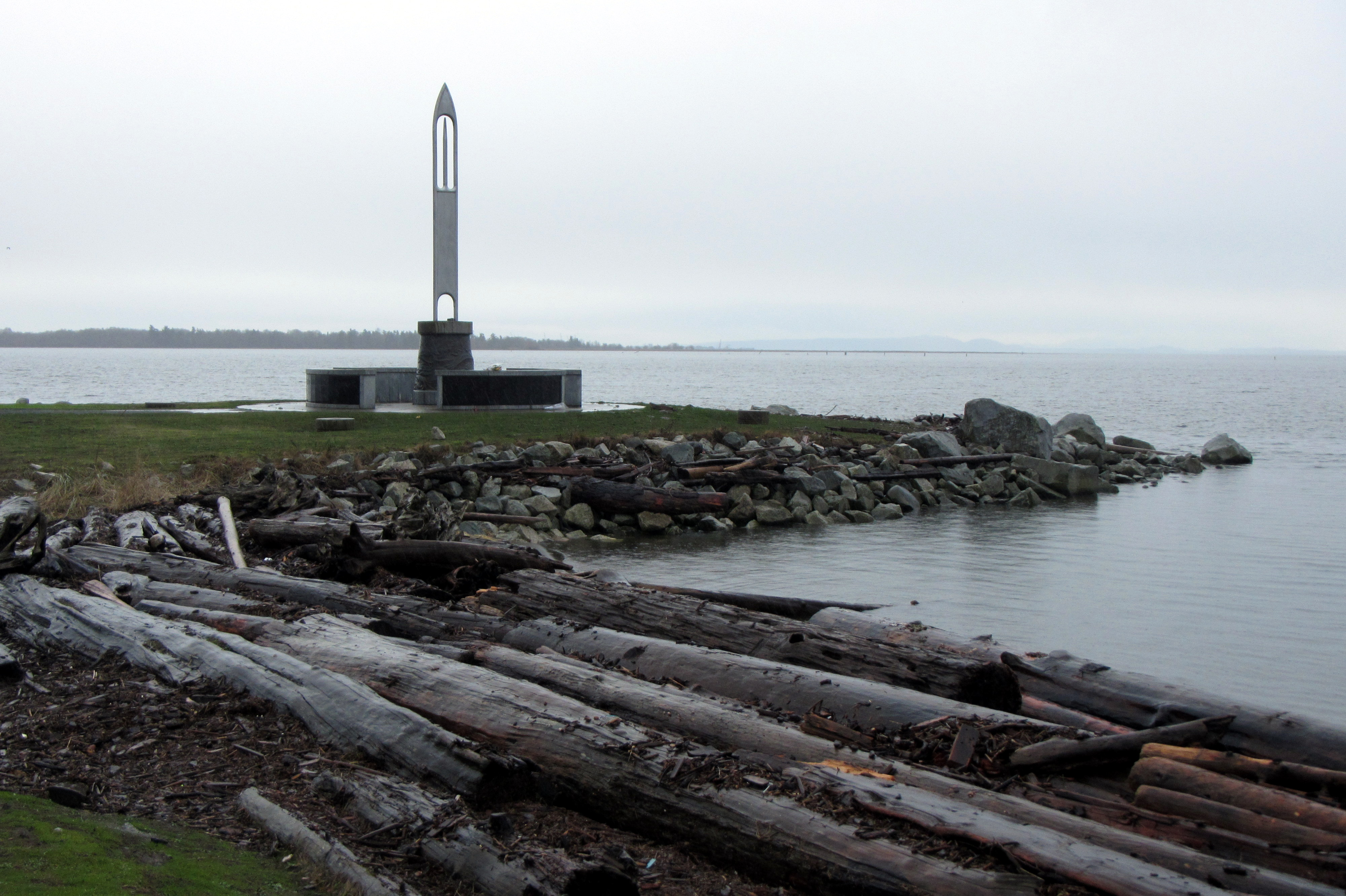
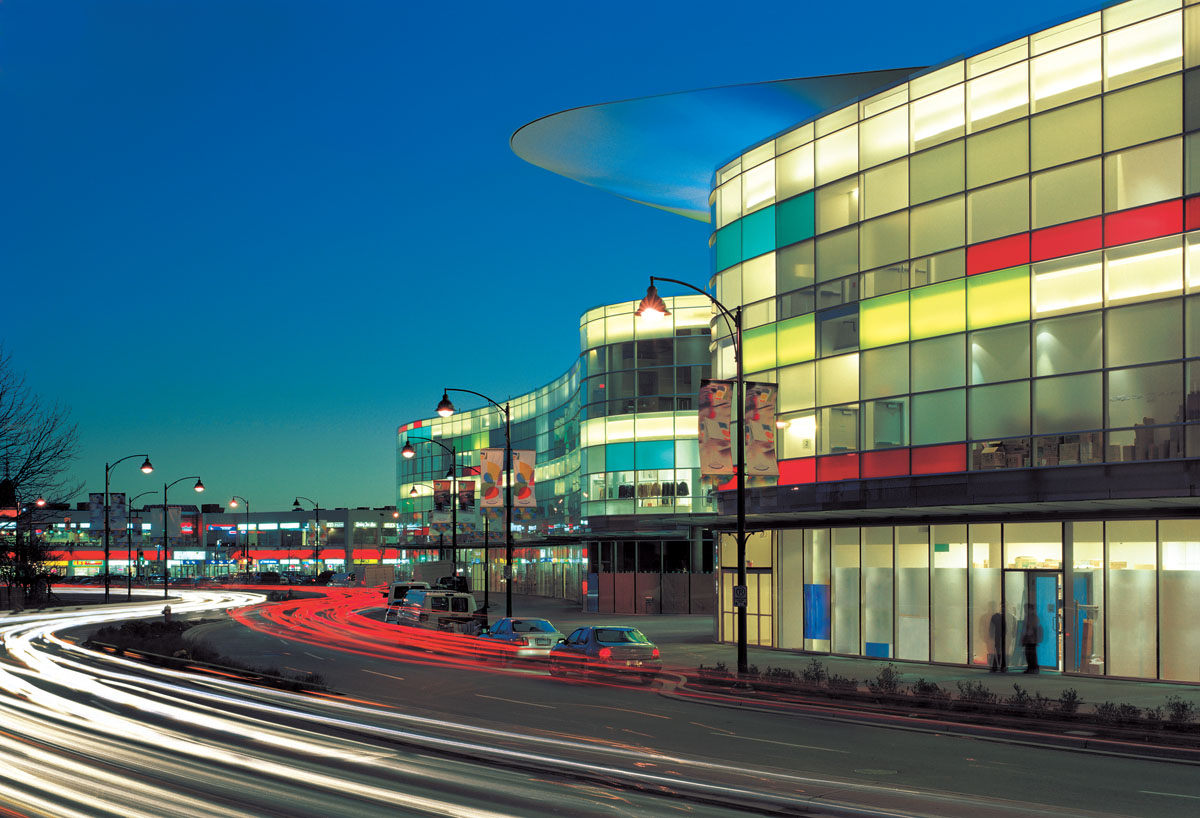
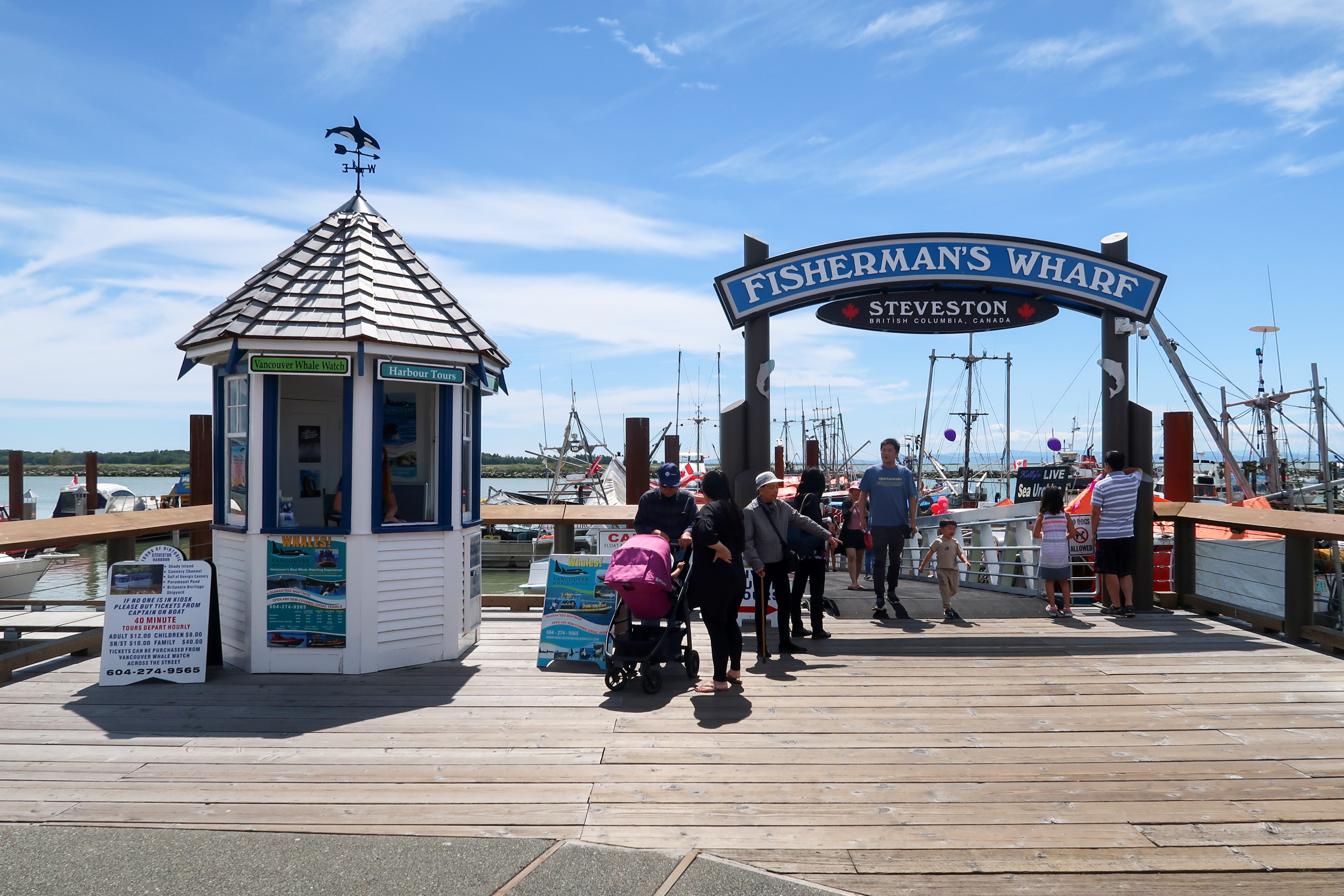
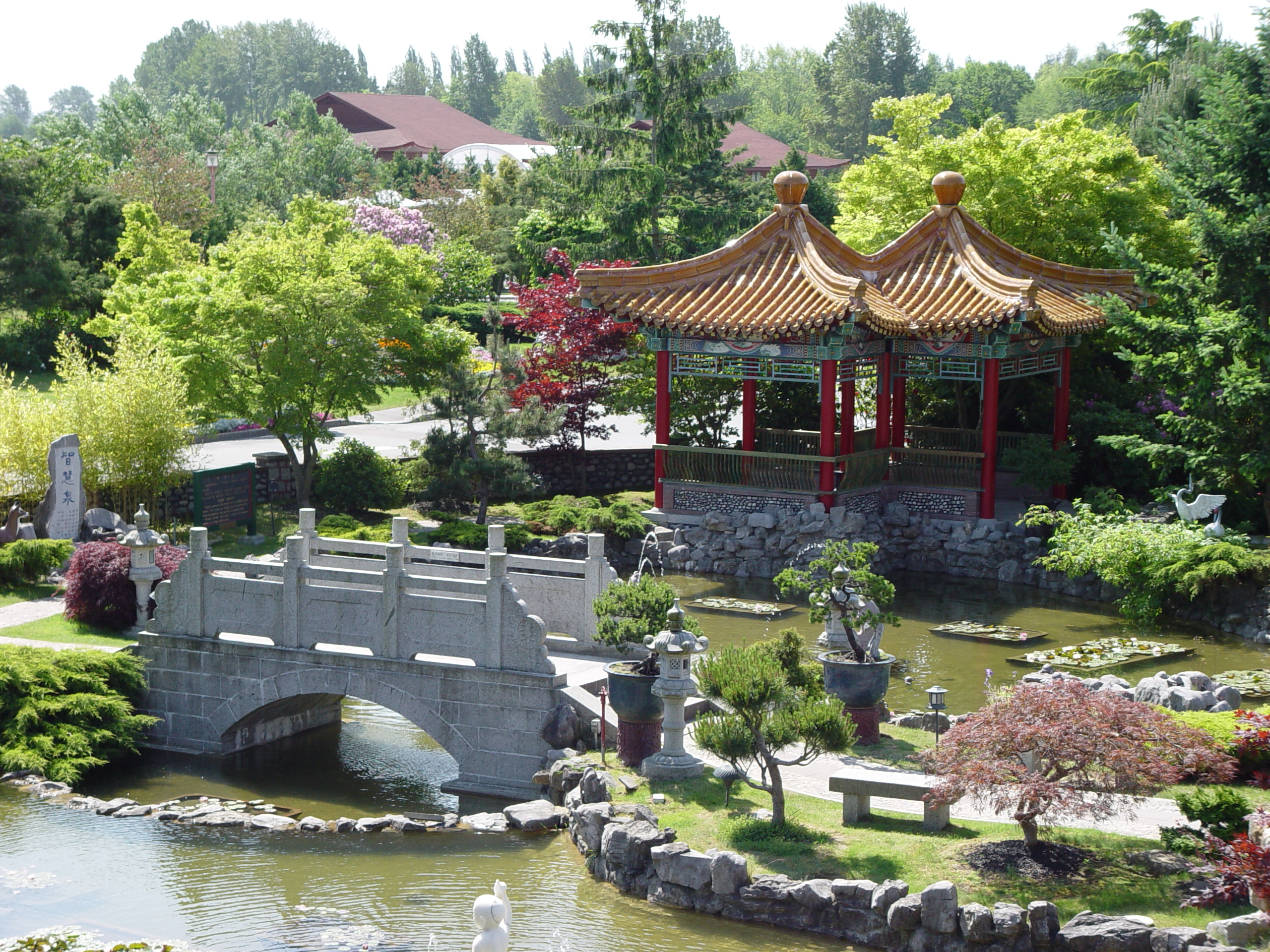
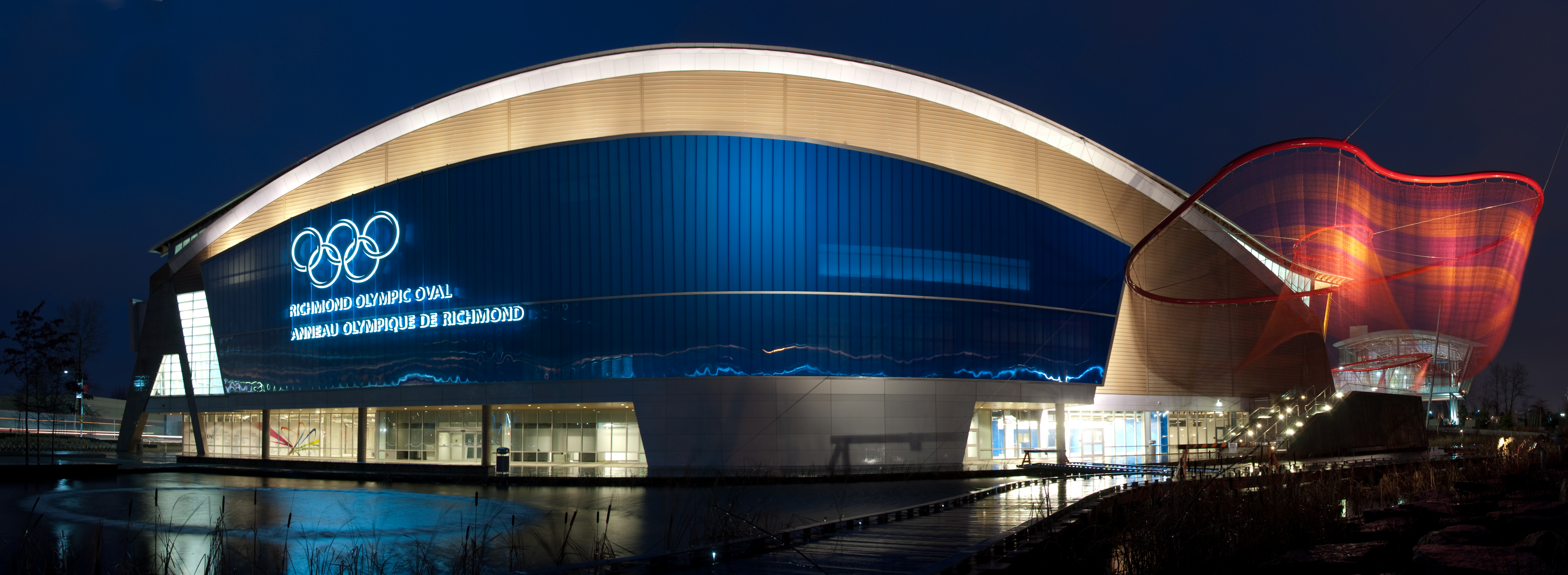
- Richmond City Centre Garry Point Park Golden Village Fisherman's Wharf, Steveston International Buddhist Temple Richmond Olympic Oval

- Flag Logo
- Mottoes: Child of the Fraser; Island City by Nature
- Location of Richmond in Metro Vancouver
- Coordinates: 49°10′N 123°8′W
- Country: Canada
- Province: British Columbia
- Regional district: Metro Vancouver
- Incorporated: 10 November 1879 (municipality status)
- 3 December 1990 (city status)
- Seat: Richmond City Hall

Government
  - Type: Mayor-council government
  - Body: Richmond City Council
  - Mayor: Rob Howard (Richmond Forward)
  - City Council: List of councillors: Chak Au; Carol Day; Laura Gillanders; Kash Heed; Andy Hobbs; Alexa Loo; Bill McNulty; Michael Wolfe
  - MP: List of MPs: Chak Au (Conservative) Richmond Centre—Marpole; Parm Bains (Liberal) Richmond East—Steveston
  - MLA: List of MLAs: Steve Kooner (CPBC) Richmond-Queensborough; Sacha Peter (CPBC) Richmond Centre; Gordon Zhang (CPBC) Richmond-Steveston; Teresa Wat (CPBC) Richmond-Bridgeport

Area
  - Land: 128.87 km^{2} (49.76 sq mi)
- Highest elevation: 12 m (39 ft)
- Lowest elevation: 0 m (0 ft)

Population (2021)
  - Total: 209,937
  - Estimate (2023): 229,781
  - Rank: 26th in Canada; 4th in British Columbia; 4th in Metro Vancouver
  - Density: 1,629/km^{2} (4,220/sq mi)
- Demonym: Richmondite
- Time zone: UTC−07:00 (Pacific Time)
- Forward sortation area: V6V – V6Y, V7A – V7C, V7E
- Area codes: 604, 778, 236, 672
- Highways: Highway 91; Highway 99; Knight Street
- Website: richmond.ca

Richmond is a city in British Columbia, Canada. It occupies almost the entirety of Lulu Island (excluding Queensborough), the adjacent Sea Island (where the Vancouver International Airport is located) and several other smaller islands and uninhabited islets to its north and south. Across the two estuarine distributaries of the Fraser River, it neighbours Vancouver and Burnaby on the Burrard Peninsula to the north, New Westminster and Annacis Island to the east, Delta to the south, and the Strait of Georgia to the west.

The indigenous Coast Salish peoples were the first people to inhabit the area of modern-day Richmond, with the Musqueam Band naming the site near Terra Nova "spələkʷəqs" or "boiling point". As of the 2021 Canadian census, East Asian Canadians make up a majority of Richmond's population at 57.1%. The broader Asian Canadian population, which includes Southeast Asian Canadians and South Asian Canadians, comprises 73.4% of the city's total population.

The city is a member municipality of Metro Vancouver. It is composed of sixteen areas: City Centre, Steveston, Broadmoor, Blundell, Seafair, Thompson, Shellmont, West Cambie, East Cambie, Hamilton, Bridgeport, East Richmond, Sea Island, Gilmore, Fraser Lands, and the South Arm Islands. As of 2023, the city has an estimated population of 229,781 people.

During the 2010 Winter Olympics, the Richmond Olympic Oval was a venue for long track speed skating events.

== History ==
Coast Salish bands had temporary camps on the island, to fish and collect berries, which were scattered and moved from year to year. Certain Coast Salish summer camps were located at Garry Point, and Woodward's Landing, along with the site of the Terra Nova cannery, which had at one time been a Musqueam village.

There is no definitive historical account as to how Richmond was named. There are several possibilities that have been proposed, including:

- The first family to settle in Richmond, that of Hugh McRoberts, had formerly lived in Australia. Their home there was called "Richmond View", and that is what they named their homestead in Richmond.
- W.D. Ferris drafted the original petition for the incorporation of The Township of Richmond. He was originally from Richmond, Surrey, England.
- Another early settler was Hugh Boyd. He was also the first Reeve of the township. His wife had been born in Richmond, North Yorkshire, England.

The Township of Richmond, British Columbia was incorporated on 10 November 1879. The Township of Richmond was modelled after Ontario's political townships – an incorporated municipality, consisting of communities that are united as a single entity with a single municipal administration. Each community was represented on the municipal council through a ward electoral system with five wards until 1946 when the ward electoral system was replaced with the at large electoral system that is currently in place.

On 3 December 1990, Richmond was designated as a City.

The first Town Hall, the Agricultural Hall and the Methodist Church (now Minoru Chapel), were built at the corner of No. 17 (River) Rd and No. 20 (Cambie) Rd near the main settlement on the northwestern tip of Lulu Island at North Arm.

The old fishing village of Steveston on the southwestern tip of Lulu Island is now home to several museums and heritage sites, as well as a working harbour for fishing boats. Currently, London Heritage Farm, the Gulf of Georgia Cannery and the Britannia Shipyard National Historic Site in Steveston highlight these parts of Richmond's diverse history.

== Geography ==
Richmond is made up of most of the islands in the Fraser River delta, the largest and most populated island being Lulu Island. The city of Richmond includes all but a small portion of Lulu Island (the Queensborough neighbourhood at the far eastern tip is part of the city of New Westminster). The next largest island, Sea Island, is home to the Vancouver International Airport (YVR). In addition to Lulu and Sea Islands, 15 smaller islands make up the city's 128.87 square kilometres (49.76 sq mi) land area, including:

- Mitchell Island, an industrial island accessed via the Knight Street Bridge, a bridge which connects Richmond and Vancouver.
- Richmond Island, a former sand bar that has been turned into a peninsula that can only be reached from Vancouver, but technically is within Richmond's city limits.
- Shady Island, an uninhabited island covered with trees, which can be reached over land by foot at low tide from near Steveston.

The city also includes the fishing village of Steveston, located in the far southwest corner of the city, and Burkeville, which shares Sea Island with the airport. Both Steveston and Burkeville were independent villages until they were annexed by Richmond.

Since all of Richmond occupies islands in a river delta, the city has plenty of rich, alluvial soil for agriculture, and was one of the first areas in British Columbia to be farmed by Europeans in the 19th century. The drawback of Richmond's geographical location was that since all the land averages just one metre above sea level, it was prone to flooding, especially during high tide. As a result, all the major islands are now surrounded by a system of dykes, which, although not as massive as those in the Netherlands or the levees of New Orleans, serve to protect the city from anticipated sources of flooding. There is a possibility that, during an earthquake, the dykes could rupture, and the alluvial soil may liquefy, causing extensive damage. Richmond is also at risk of a major flood if the Fraser River has an unusually high spring freshet. Recreational trails run along the tops of many of the dykes, and Richmond also supports about 1,400 acres (5.7 km^{2}) of parkland.

Because of the high groundwater table, very few houses in Richmond have basements and until the late 1980s, very few buildings were above 3 storeys high. Also, because of proximity to the airport, current building codes limit the height of buildings to 150 feet (46 m).

=== Climate ===
Richmond has an oceanic climate (Cfb). Because it is not as close to the mountains, it actually receives 30% less rain than neighbouring Vancouver. It rarely snows in winter, and the summer temperatures are mild to warm. Richmond is also very cloudy in the cooler months.

Climate data for Richmond Nature Park (1981–2010 Normals)
| Month | Jan | Feb | Mar | Apr | May | Jun | Jul | Aug | Sep | Oct | Nov | Dec | Year |
|---|---|---|---|---|---|---|---|---|---|---|---|---|---|
| Record high °C (°F) | 16.5 (61.7) | 19.5 (67.1) | 24.0 (75.2) | 28.5 (83.3) | 34.5 (94.1) | 37.0 (98.6) | 37.0 (98.6) | 33.5 (92.3) | 35.0 (95.0) | 26.0 (78.8) | 18.5 (65.3) | 14.0 (57.2) | 37.0 (98.6) |
| Mean daily maximum °C (°F) | 7.0 (44.6) | 8.9 (48.0) | 11.9 (53.4) | 15.1 (59.2) | 18.6 (65.5) | 21.3 (70.3) | 23.9 (75.0) | 24.0 (75.2) | 20.3 (68.5) | 14.3 (57.7) | 9.1 (48.4) | 6.3 (43.3) | 15.1 (59.2) |
| Daily mean °C (°F) | 4.0 (39.2) | 4.9 (40.8) | 7.3 (45.1) | 10.0 (50.0) | 13.3 (55.9) | 16.1 (61.0) | 18.3 (64.9) | 18.2 (64.8) | 15.0 (59.0) | 10.3 (50.5) | 6.0 (42.8) | 3.4 (38.1) | 10.6 (51.1) |
| Mean daily minimum °C (°F) | 0.9 (33.6) | 0.8 (33.4) | 2.7 (36.9) | 4.8 (40.6) | 8.0 (46.4) | 10.8 (51.4) | 12.6 (54.7) | 12.5 (54.5) | 9.6 (49.3) | 6.2 (43.2) | 2.8 (37.0) | 0.4 (32.7) | 6.0 (42.8) |
| Record low °C (°F) | −15 (5) | −14 (7) | −7 (19) | −2 (28) | 0.0 (32.0) | 0.0 (32.0) | 4.0 (39.2) | 4.0 (39.2) | 1.0 (33.8) | −6 (21) | −15.5 (4.1) | −16.5 (2.3) | −16.5 (2.3) |
| Average precipitation mm (inches) | 178.6 (7.03) | 114.9 (4.52) | 112.2 (4.42) | 95.4 (3.76) | 71.9 (2.83) | 62.2 (2.45) | 37.2 (1.46) | 40.1 (1.58) | 56.8 (2.24) | 127.2 (5.01) | 199.3 (7.85) | 166.7 (6.56) | 1,262.4 (49.70) |
| Average rainfall mm (inches) | 167.3 (6.59) | 107.9 (4.25) | 109.8 (4.32) | 95.3 (3.75) | 71.9 (2.83) | 62.2 (2.45) | 37.2 (1.46) | 40.1 (1.58) | 56.8 (2.24) | 126.8 (4.99) | 196.8 (7.75) | 155.7 (6.13) | 1,227.8 (48.34) |
| Average snowfall cm (inches) | 11.3 (4.4) | 7.0 (2.8) | 2.3 (0.9) | 0.2 (0.1) | 0.0 (0.0) | 0.0 (0.0) | 0.0 (0.0) | 0.0 (0.0) | 0.0 (0.0) | 0.3 (0.1) | 2.5 (1.0) | 11.0 (4.3) | 34.6 (13.6) |
| Average precipitation days (≥ 0.2 mm) | 20.9 | 16.1 | 19.4 | 16.6 | 14.7 | 12.6 | 7.9 | 7.2 | 9.1 | 17.2 | 21.9 | 20.3 | 183.8 |
| Average rainy days (≥ 0.2 mm) | 19.9 | 15.4 | 19.3 | 16.6 | 14.7 | 12.6 | 7.9 | 7.2 | 9.1 | 17.1 | 21.5 | 19.1 | 180.4 |
| Average snowy days (≥ 0.2 cm) | 2.0 | 1.3 | 0.77 | 0.04 | 0.0 | 0.0 | 0.0 | 0.0 | 0.0 | 0.08 | 0.64 | 2.2 | 7.1 |
Source: Environment Canada

== Demographics ==
Historical populations
| Year | Pop. | ±% |
|---|---|---|
| 1981 | 96,154 | — |
| 1991 | 126,624 | +31.7% |
| 1996 | 148,867 | +17.6% |
| 2001 | 164,345 | +10.4% |
| 2006 | 174,461 | +6.2% |
| 2011 | 190,473 | +9.2% |
| 2016 | 198,309 | +4.1% |
| 2021 | 209,937 | +5.9% |

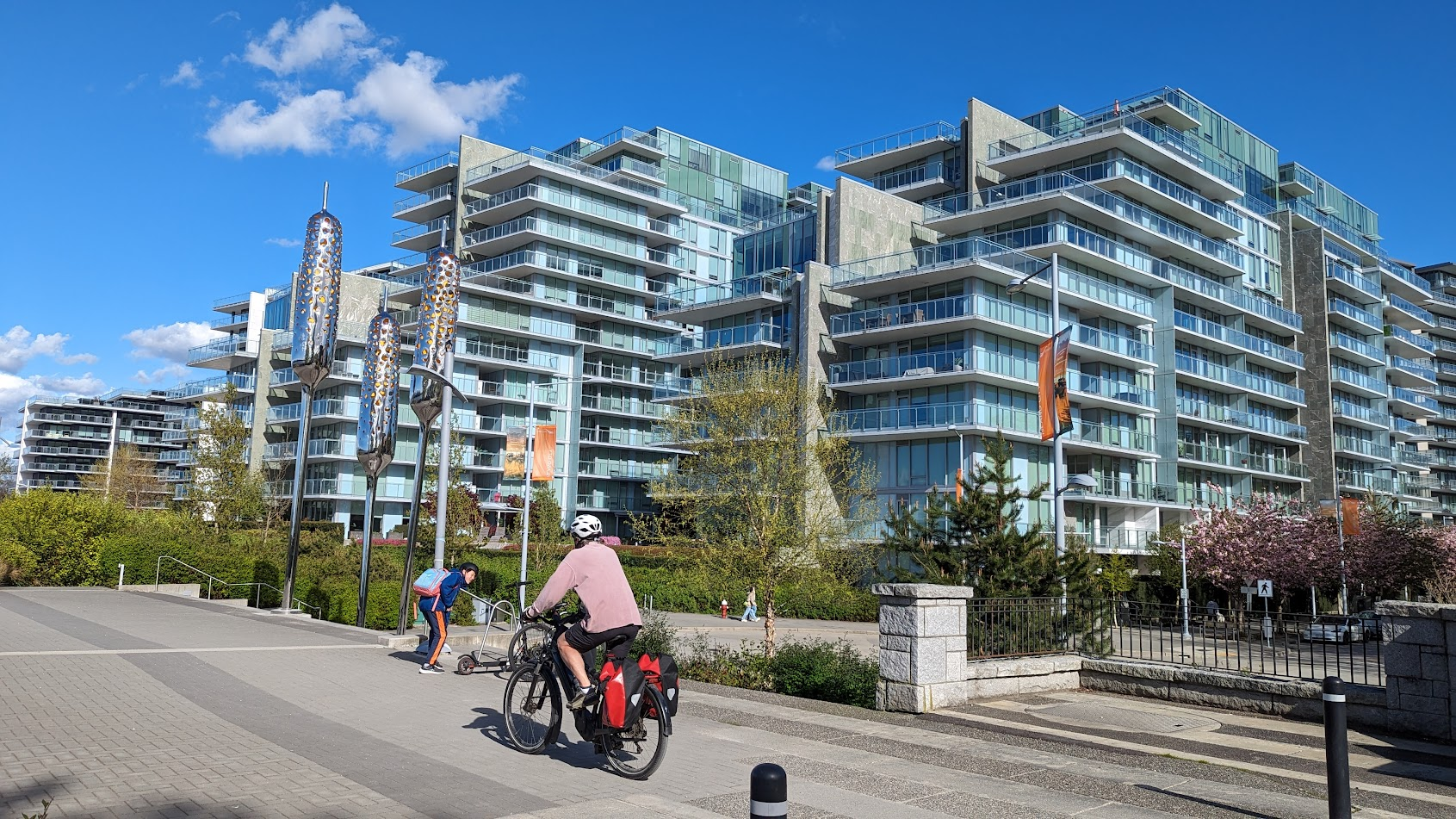
Apartment buildings line the Middle Arm Waterfront Trail in Oval Village.

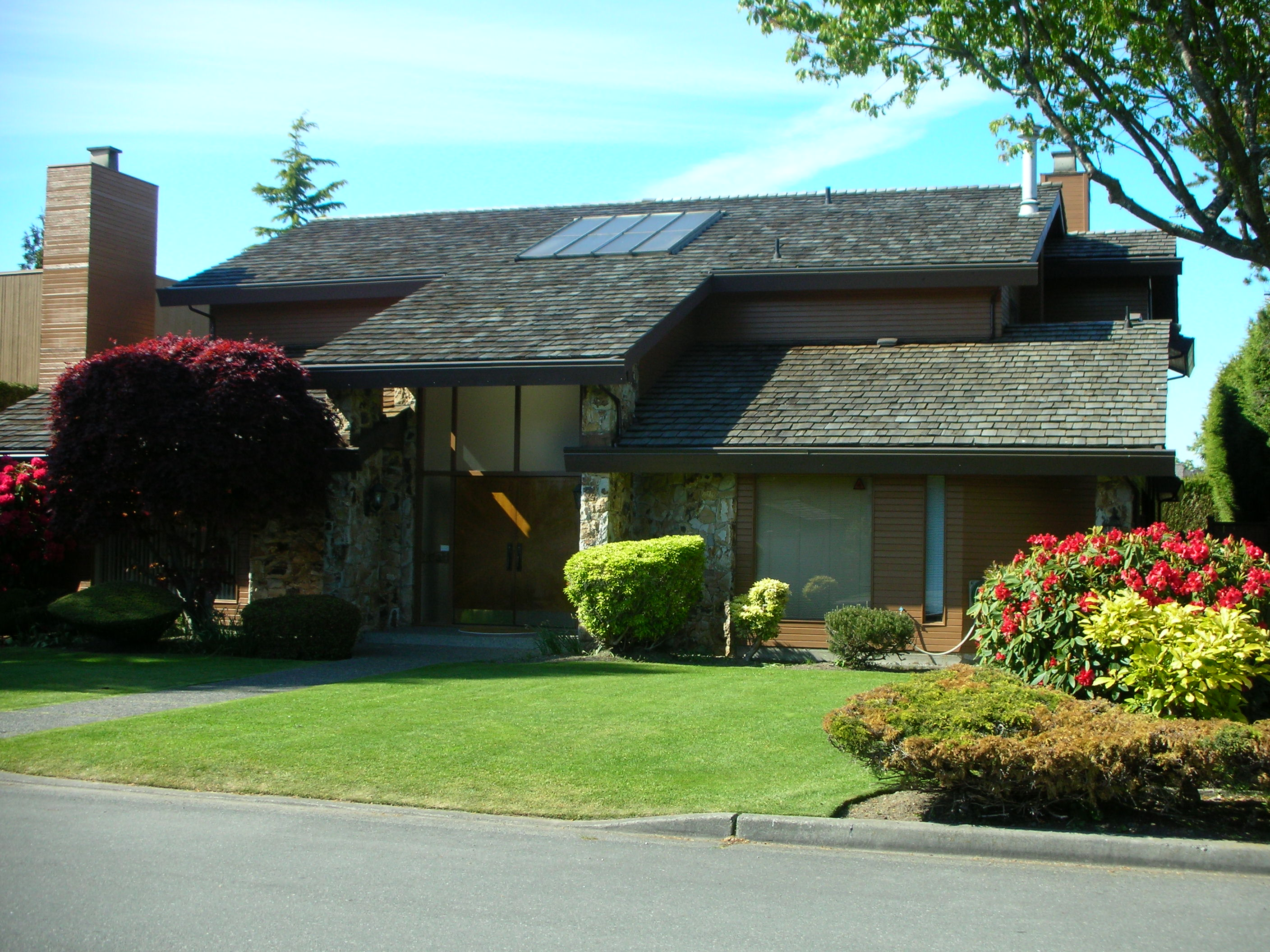
A 1970's West Coast-style suburban single family home.

In the 2021 Census of Population conducted by Statistics Canada, Richmond had a population of 209,937 living in 81,080 of its 85,035 total private dwellings, a change of 5.9% from its 2016 population of 198,309. The average age of the population was 43.3 years old, and the median age of the population was 43.6. Of the population, 13.3 per cent was 0 to 14 years of age, 20 per cent was 65 years and over, 2.4 per cent was 85 years and over, and 66.7 per cent was the age 15 to 64 years old. Richmond's 2021 population of 209,937 makes it the fourth-largest city in British Columbia, after Vancouver (662,248), Surrey (568,322) and Burnaby (249,125).

Richmond has a land area of 128.87 km^{2} (49.76 sq mi) and a population density of 1,629.1/km^{2} (4,219.2/sq mi) in 2021. The average size of a household in Richmond is 2.6 persons. Most households have a household size of 2 persons, and the least households have 5 or more persons. Apartment buildings are the most common structural type of dwellings, made up of 18,590 apartment in a building that has fewer than five storeys, 15,475 apartment in a building that has five or more storeys, and 4,990 apartment or flat in a duplex. Single-detached houses are also popular with 24,435 single-detached houses located in Richmond. Other types of buildings include 1,585, semi-detached houses 15,945 row houses, 20 other single-attached houses, and 45 movable dwellings.

The average price of a detached home in Richmond is $1,581,600.

Richmond has an immigrant population of 60 per cent, the highest in Canada.

Richmond is also home to two of the largest Buddhist temples in North America, the International Buddhist Temple and the Ling Yen Mountain Temple.

=== Ethnicity ===
Largest non-East Asian panethnic group in Richmond by census tracts based on the 2021 census

Approximately half of Richmond residents identify as having Chinese ancestry with the BBC calling it "North America's most Asian city" in 2012. (Note: The term "Asian" used according to contemporary Canadian parlance and for Canadian government census purposes describes Asian people § Canada as a race. Furthermore, the term "Asian" in Canada is often synonymous with people of East Asian ancestry. Ethno-racial groups from other parts of Continental Asia or of Continental Asian origin are not considered "Asian" by Canadian usage.) East Asian Canadians make up a majority of Richmond's population, many of whom immigrated in the late 1980s, mostly from Hong Kong, Taiwan, and Mainland China on top of the Japanese Canadian community who immigrated to Canada nearly a century earlier. Almost three quarters of city's population is of Continental Asian descent, where other Continental Asian Canadians communities residing in Richmond include Indo-Canadians and Filipino Canadians.

Largest non-Chinese ethnic origin in Richmond by census tracts based based on the 2021 census

The largest ethnicities in Richmond as per the 2021 census are Chinese (47.9%), Filipino (7.6%), English (5.8%), Hong Konger (4.7%), Scottish (4.7%), Indian (4.5%), Irish (3.7%), Taiwanese (3.2%), and German (3%).

Richmond's Japanese community has a long history in Steveston dating back to the 1800s. Following Japan's 1941 attack on Pearl Harbor, the Anti-Japanese sentiment grew, and this community was devastated as residents of Japanese descent were relocated to internment camps in the BC Interior and Alberta and their property sold at auction.

| Pan-ethnic groups in Richmond (2021): 1. East Asian (57.1%); 2. European (18.9%); 3. Southeast Asian (8.85%); 4. South Asian (7.38%); 5. Other / multiracial (3.26%); 6. Middle Eastern (1.86%); 7. Latin American (1.03%); 8. African (0.85%); 9. Indigenous (0.74%) | Pan-ethnic groups in Richmond (2011): 1. East Asian (49.8%); 2. European (28.6%); 3. Southeast Asian (7.83%); 4. South Asian (7.67%); 5. Other / multiracial (2.47%); 6. Middle Eastern (1.16%); 7. Indigenous (1.02%); 8. Latin American (0.89%); 9. African (0.66%) | Pan-ethnic groups in Richmond (2001): 1. East Asian (42.1%); 2. European (40.3%); 3. South Asian (7.42%); 4. Southeast Asian (5.17%); 5. Other / multiracial (1.46%); 6. Middle Eastern (1.24%); 7. African (0.90%); 8. Indigenous (0.71%); 9. Latin American (0.71%) |

Panethnic groups in the City of Richmond (2001−2021)
| Panethnic group | 2021 | | 2016 | | 2011 | | 2006 | | 2001 | |
| Panethnic group | Pop. | % | Pop. | % | Pop. | % | Pop. | % | Pop. | % |
|---|---|---|---|---|---|---|---|---|---|---|
| East Asian (Note: Statistic includes total responses of "Chinese", "Korean", and "Japanese" under visible minority section on census.) | 118,980 | 57.09% | 109,415 | 55.64% | 94,180 | 49.75% | 80,245 | 46.23% | 68,785 | 42.1% |
| European (Note: Statistic includes all persons that did not make up part of a visible minority or an aboriginal identity.) | 39,465 | 18.94% | 45,050 | 22.91% | 54,050 | 28.55% | 59,335 | 34.19% | 65,845 | 40.3% |
| Southeast Asian (Note: Statistic includes total responses of "Filipino" and "Southeast Asian" under visible minority section on census.) | 18,435 | 8.85% | 15,530 | 7.9% | 14,820 | 7.83% | 11,035 | 6.36% | 8,445 | 5.17% |
| South Asian | 15,370 | 7.38% | 14,360 | 7.3% | 14,515 | 7.67% | 13,860 | 7.99% | 12,120 | 7.42% |
| Middle Eastern (Note: Statistic includes total responses of "West Asian" and "Arab" under visible minority section on census.) | 3,875 | 1.86% | 2,715 | 1.38% | 2,205 | 1.16% | 2,115 | 1.22% | 2,030 | 1.24% |
| Indigenous | 1,540 | 0.74% | 1,595 | 0.81% | 1,935 | 1.02% | 1,275 | 0.73% | 1,165 | 0.71% |
| Latin American | 2,155 | 1.03% | 1,585 | 0.81% | 1,680 | 0.89% | 1,265 | 0.73% | 1,165 | 0.71% |
| Black African | 1,775 | 0.85% | 1,270 | 0.65% | 1,245 | 0.66% | 1,390 | 0.8% | 1,470 | 0.9% |
| Other/multiracial (Note: Statistic includes total responses of "Visible minority, n.i.e." and "Multiple visible minorities" under visible minority section on census.) | 6,800 | 3.26% | 5,155 | 2.62% | 4,675 | 2.47% | 3,040 | 1.75% | 2,380 | 1.46% |
| Total responses | 208,400 | 99.27% | 196,660 | 99.17% | 189,305 | 99.39% | 173,565 | 99.49% | 163,395 | 99.42% |
| Total population | 209,937 | 100% | 198,309 | 100% | 190,473 | 100% | 174,461 | 100% | 164,345 | 100% |
Note: Totals greater than 100% due to multiple origin responses

=== Languages ===
The 2021 census found that English was spoken as mother tongue by 37.1% of the population. The next most common mother tongue language was Cantonese, spoken by 23.3% of the population, followed by Mandarin at 22.7%.

Mother tongue languages in Richmond (2001–2021)
| Mother tongue | 2021 Canadian census | | 2016 Canadian census | | 2011 Canadian census | | 2006 Canadian census | | 2001 Canadian census | |
| Mother tongue | Pop. | % | Pop. | % | Pop. | % | Pop. | % | Pop. | % |
|---|---|---|---|---|---|---|---|---|---|---|
| English | 77,485 | 37.07% | 73,155 | 37.09% | 75,575 | 39.83% | 70,485 | 40.61% | 75,670 | 46.31% |
| Cantonese | 48,710 | 23.3% | 45,365 | 23% | 44,040 | 23.21% | 42,490 | 24.48% | 41,125 | 25.17% |
| Mandarin | 47,400 | 22.68% | 40,580 | 20.57% | 33,940 | 17.89% | 22,695 | 13.08% | 15,965 | 9.77% |
| Tagalog | 10,340 | 4.95% | 9,385 | 4.76% | 8,670 | 4.57% | 6,010 | 3.46% | 4,530 | 2.77% |
| Punjabi | 5,720 | 2.74% | 5,730 | 2.9% | 6,235 | 3.29% | 6,775 | 3.9% | 4,515 | 2.76% |
| Min Nan | 3,285 | 1.57% | 2,665 | 1.35% | 1,935 | 1.02% | 880 | 0.51% | —N/a | —N/a |
| Japanese | 2,435 | 1.16% | 2,320 | 1.18% | 2,220 | 1.17% | 1,810 | 1.04% | 1,890 | 1.16% |
| Spanish | 2,330 | 1.11% | 1,960 | 0.99% | 2,020 | 1.06% | 1,840 | 1.06% | 1,655 | 1.01% |
| Russian | 2,075 | 0.99% | 2,105 | 1.07% | 2,185 | 1.15% | 1,700 | 0.98% | 1,370 | 0.84% |
| Arabic | 1,850 | 0.88% | 1,395 | 0.71% | 1,085 | 0.57% | 855 | 0.49% | 780 | 0.48% |
| Korean | 1,615 | 0.77% | 1,175 | 0.6% | 905 | 0.48% | 1,090 | 0.63% | 790 | 0.48% |
| French | 1,610 | 0.77% | 1,490 | 0.76% | 1,630 | 0.86% | 1,350 | 0.78% | 1,810 | 1.11% |
| Hindi | 1,570 | 0.75% | 1,320 | 0.67% | 1,265 | 0.67% | 1,170 | 0.67% | 1,190 | 0.73% |
| Vietnamese | 1,245 | 0.6% | 865 | 0.44% | 820 | 0.43% | 680 | 0.39% | 725 | 0.44% |
| Urdu | 1,210 | 0.58% | 1,020 | 0.52% | 965 | 0.51% | 685 | 0.39% | 515 | 0.32% |
| Persian | 1,205 | 0.58% | 1,095 | 0.56% | 1,210 | 0.64% | 1,110 | 0.64% | 920 | 0.56% |
| German | 1,125 | 0.54% | 1,415 | 0.72% | 1,720 | 0.91% | 2,055 | 1.18% | 2,095 | 1.28% |
| Portuguese | 790 | 0.38% | 415 | 0.21% | 355 | 0.19% | 405 | 0.23% | 400 | 0.24% |
| Polish | 325 | 0.16% | 360 | 0.18% | 455 | 0.24% | 520 | 0.3% | 565 | 0.35% |
| Dutch | 290 | 0.14% | 390 | 0.2% | 465 | 0.25% | 525 | 0.3% | 660 | 0.4% |
| Total responses | 209,040 | 99.6% | 197,250 | 99.5% | 189,740 | 99.6% | 173,565 | 99.5% | 163,395 | 99.4% |
| Total population | 209,937 | 100% | 198,309 | 100% | 190,473 | 100% | 174,461 | 100% | 164,345 | 100% |

=== Religion ===
According to the 2021 census, religious groups in Richmond included:

- Irreligion (111,140 persons or 53.3%)
- Christianity (64,405 persons or 30.9%)
- Buddhism (11,590 persons or 5.6%)
- Islam (7,630 persons or 3.7%)
- Sikhism (6,985 persons or 3.4%)
- Hinduism (2,605 persons or 1.3%)
- Judaism (2,515 persons or 1.2%)
- Indigenous spirituality (40 persons or <0.1%)

Religious groups in the City of Richmond (1991−2021)
| Religious group | 2021 Canadian census | | 2011 Canadian census | | 2001 Canadian census | | 1991 Canadian census | |
| Religious group | Pop. | % | Pop. | % | Pop. | % | Pop. | % |
|---|---|---|---|---|---|---|---|---|
| Irreligion | 111,140 | 53.33% | 86,805 | 45.85% | 62,235 | 38.09% | 36,895 | 29.28% |
| Christianity | 64,405 | 30.9% | 71,030 | 37.52% | 73,750 | 45.14% | 73,970 | 58.71% |
| Buddhism | 11,590 | 5.56% | 12,330 | 6.51% | 11,025 | 6.75% | 3,125 | 2.48% |
| Islam | 7,630 | 3.66% | 5,530 | 2.92% | 4,950 | 3.03% | 3,165 | 2.51% |
| Sikhism | 6,985 | 3.35% | 7,155 | 3.78% | 5,755 | 3.52% | 4,495 | 3.57% |
| Hinduism | 2,605 | 1.25% | 2,675 | 1.41% | 2,100 | 1.29% | 1,500 | 1.19% |
| Judaism | 2,515 | 1.21% | 2,885 | 1.52% | 2,980 | 1.82% | 2,590 | 2.06% |
| Indigenous spirituality | 40 | 0.02% | 35 | 0.02% | 35 | 0.02% | —N/a | —N/a |
| Other | 1,490 | 0.71% | 860 | 0.45% | 575 | 0.35% | 245 | 0.19% |
| Total responses | 208,400 | 99.27% | 189,305 | 99.39% | 163,395 | 99.42% | 125,995 | 99.5% |
| Total population | 209,937 | 100% | 190,473 | 100% | 164,345 | 100% | 126,624 | 100% |

== Economy ==
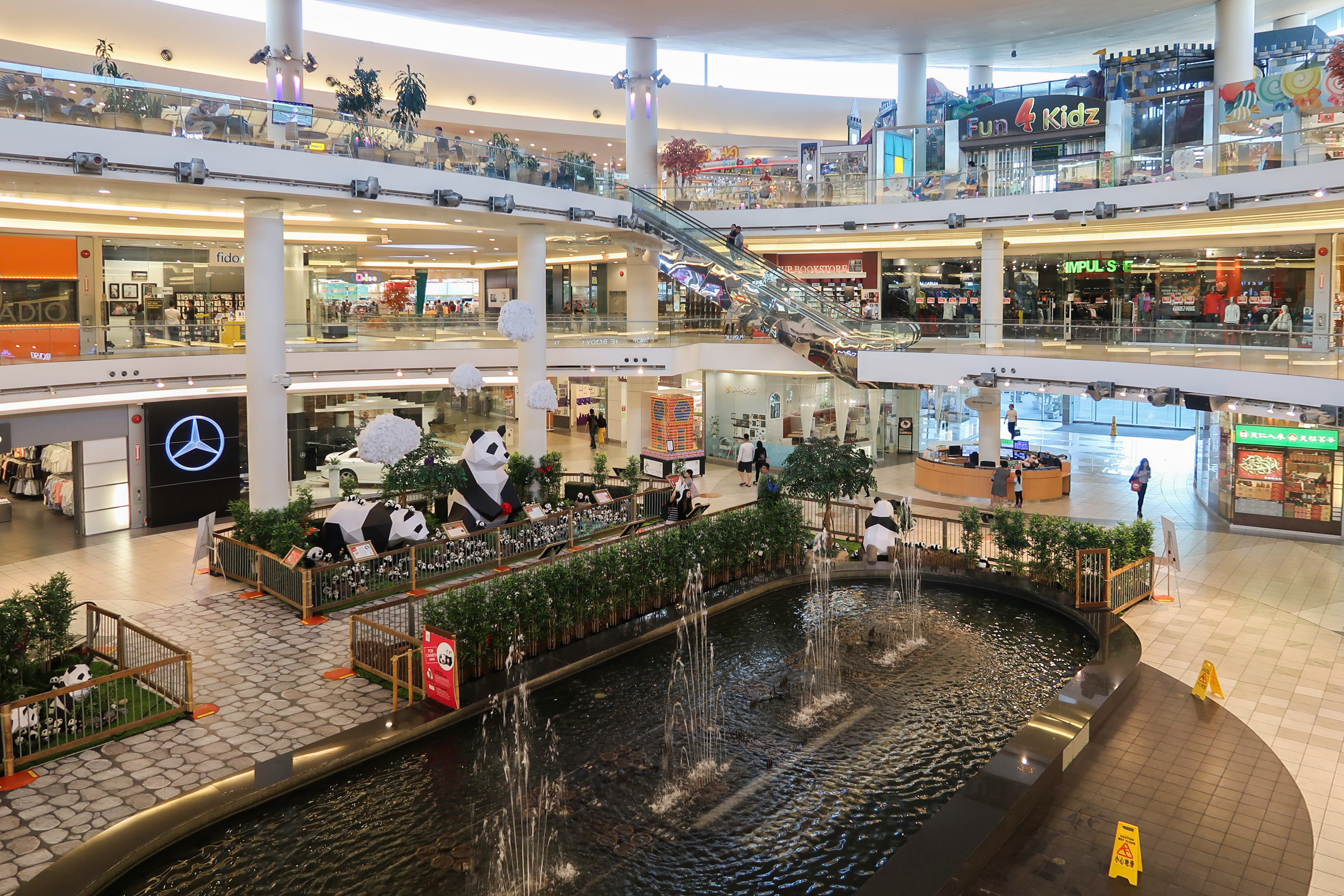
Aberdeen Centre

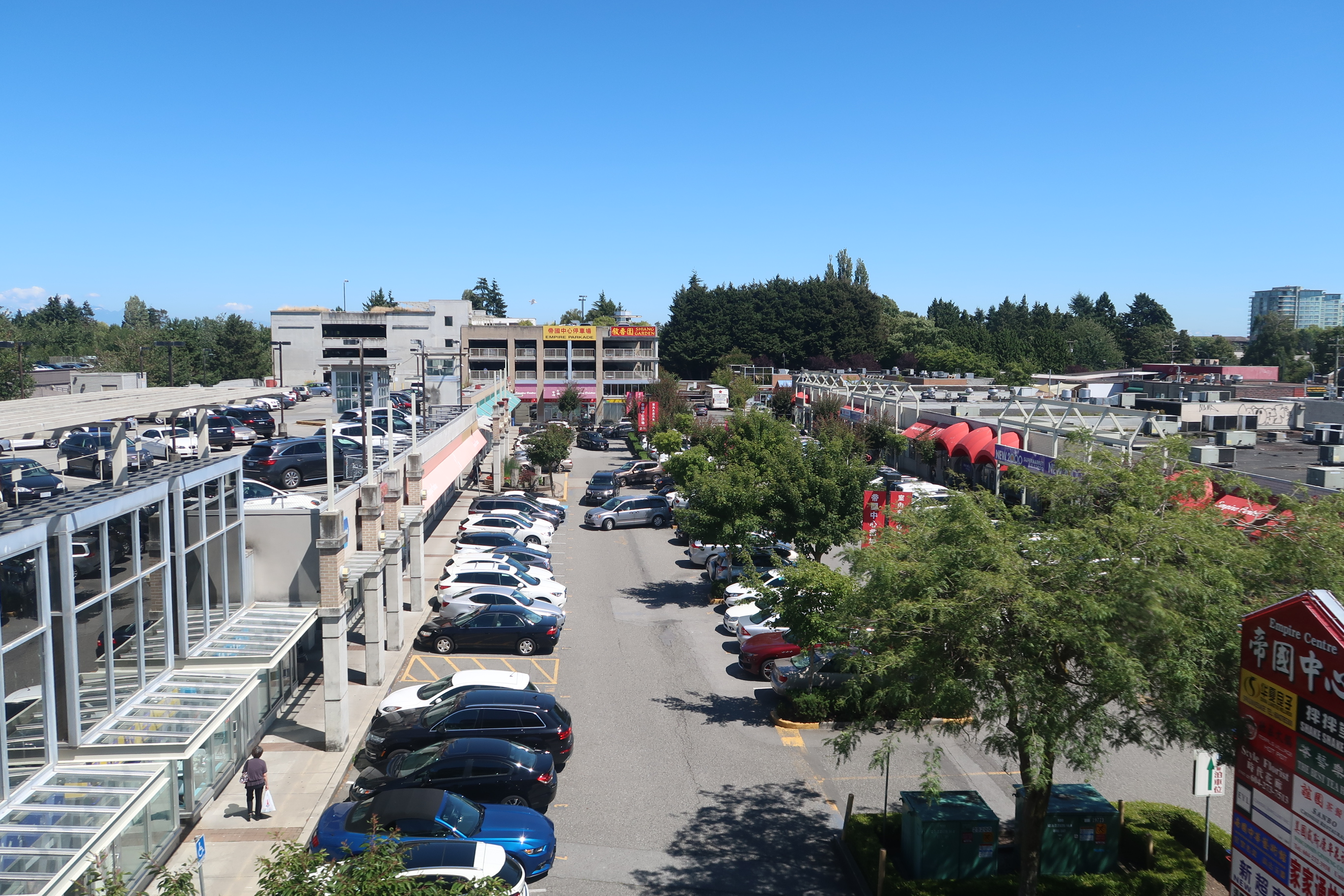
Empire Centre

Richmond supports about 100,000 jobs in various areas, including services, retailing, tourism, light manufacturing, airport services and aviation, agriculture, fishing, and government. Richmond is also a leading centre in the region for high-technology companies, including Norsat and Sierra Wireless.

Before its dissolution, Canadian Airlines operated an office in Richmond. Before it merged into Air Canada Jazz, regional airline Air BC was headquartered in Richmond. Prior to its dissolution, Harmony Airways, Pacific Western Airlines and Canadian Pacific Air Lines were all headquartered in Richmond.

The first McDonald's restaurant outside of the United States was opened in Richmond in June 1967.

=== Agriculture ===
The Agricultural Land Reserve preserves 4,916 hectares within the city as farmland, an area that makes up most of east Richmond. Of this area, 3,012 hectares are farmed by 247 farms; the rest is either vacant or occupied by non-farm uses. Cranberries and blueberries are the dominant crops grown. Other crops grown include strawberries, corn, and potatoes. In 2001, Richmond had approximately 47% of BC's cranberry acreage.

=== Retail ===
Richmond Centre, Lansdowne Centre, McArthurGlen Vancouver, Parker Place, Aberdeen Centre, and Central at Garden City are some of the most prominent malls in Richmond. The success of these malls has created significant economic growth in Richmond. In 2023, Richmond Centre was ranked 4th in Canada for shopping centres by sales per square foot. Offices, apartment buildings, and transportation hubs have sprung up around the mall. While McArthurGlen Vancouver has been given the Best Outlet Centre 2015 award at MAPIC.

Richmond is also home to many Chinese-oriented shopping malls, most of them along No. 3 Road from Alderbridge Way to Capstan Way. This area is officially termed as the "Golden Village" by Tourism Richmond and includes malls such as Aberdeen Centre, Continental Centre, Union Square, President Plaza, Parker Place, and Yaohan Centre. The strip malls located on Alexandra Road are famous for their restaurants, and the area is more commonly known as "food street".

Neighbourhood shopping centres are distributed throughout Richmond's residential areas, serving as central gathering points for their surrounding communities. These centres provide essential services such as grocery stores, restaurants, cafes, and pharmacies. Examples include Garden City Shopping Centre, Blundell Centre, Broadmoor Village, Ironwood Plaza, Terra Nova Village, Cambie Plaza, and Seafair Shopping Centre.

Street-facing retail and dining establishments are also prevalent in the city, particularly concentrated in the City Centre and Steveston Village.

=== Development ===
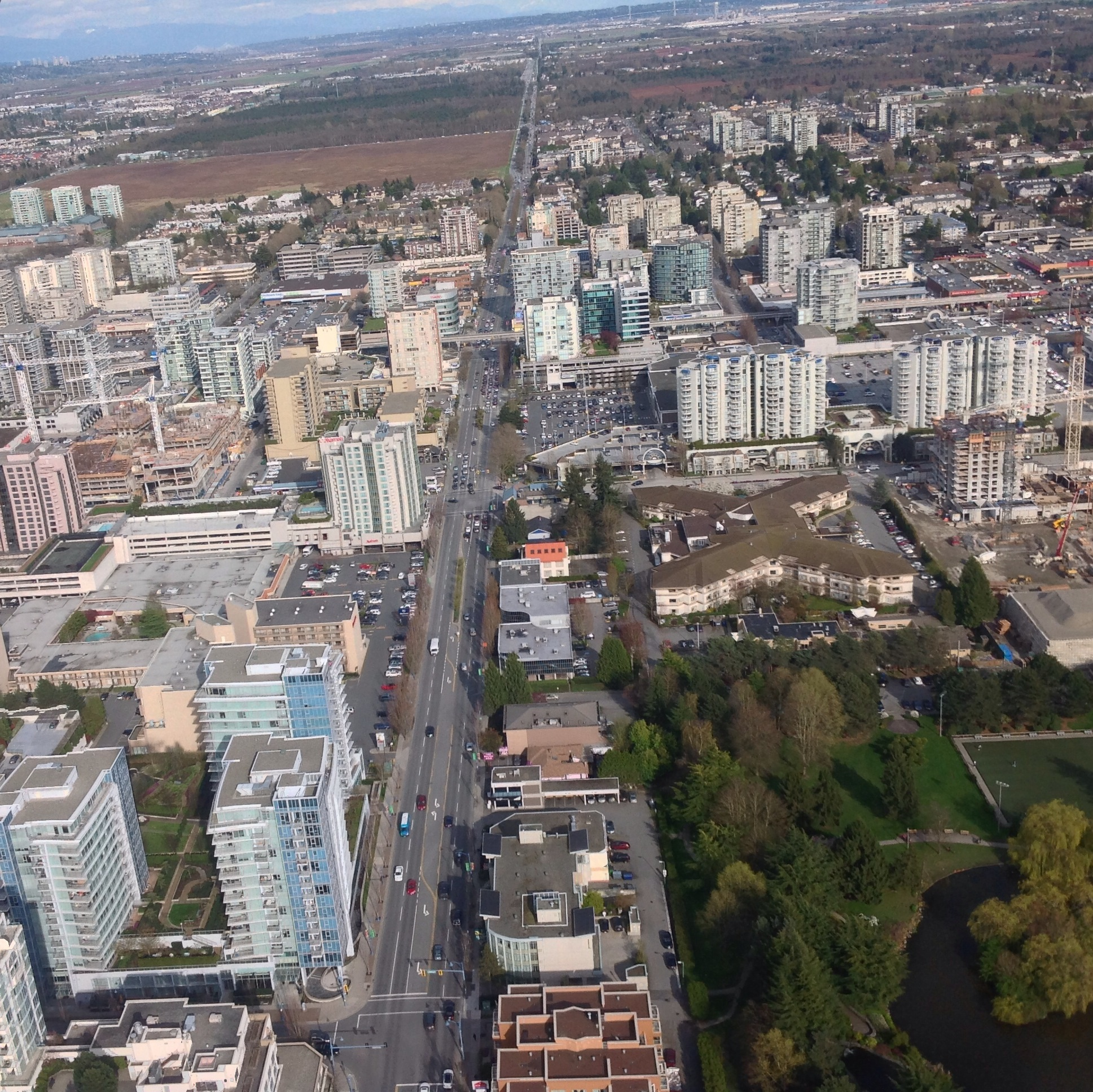
East-facing aerial view of Westminster Highway and Canada Line

Richmond city planners are one year into their update of its official plan, passed in fall 2019, for the city centre. The plan is anchored by the Canada Line and includes the development of nine transit-oriented village centres. The population of the area is expected to grow from about 40,000 to 120,000 residents.

According to a senior planner for the city, the goal of the plan is to "turn the middle arm of the Fraser River into a focus instead of an edge." A Richmond parks manager said that for "too long residents have felt contained by the river, seen it as being to their backs. Now, they want people to face the river and embrace the waterfront."

==== Lansdowne ====
Lansdowne Centre is proposing to undergo redevelopment to make way for a 50-acre master planned mixed-use community, which is estimated to take 20 years to build out. Within this development plan, there will be mixed use buildings featuring retail, offices, and housing. Large public spaces in the forms of parks and plazas will be interspersed in between. The property owner, Vanprop Investment Ltd., has plans for Lansdowne to be a pedestrian-friendly area with shops and services lined within its block.

==== Oval Village ====
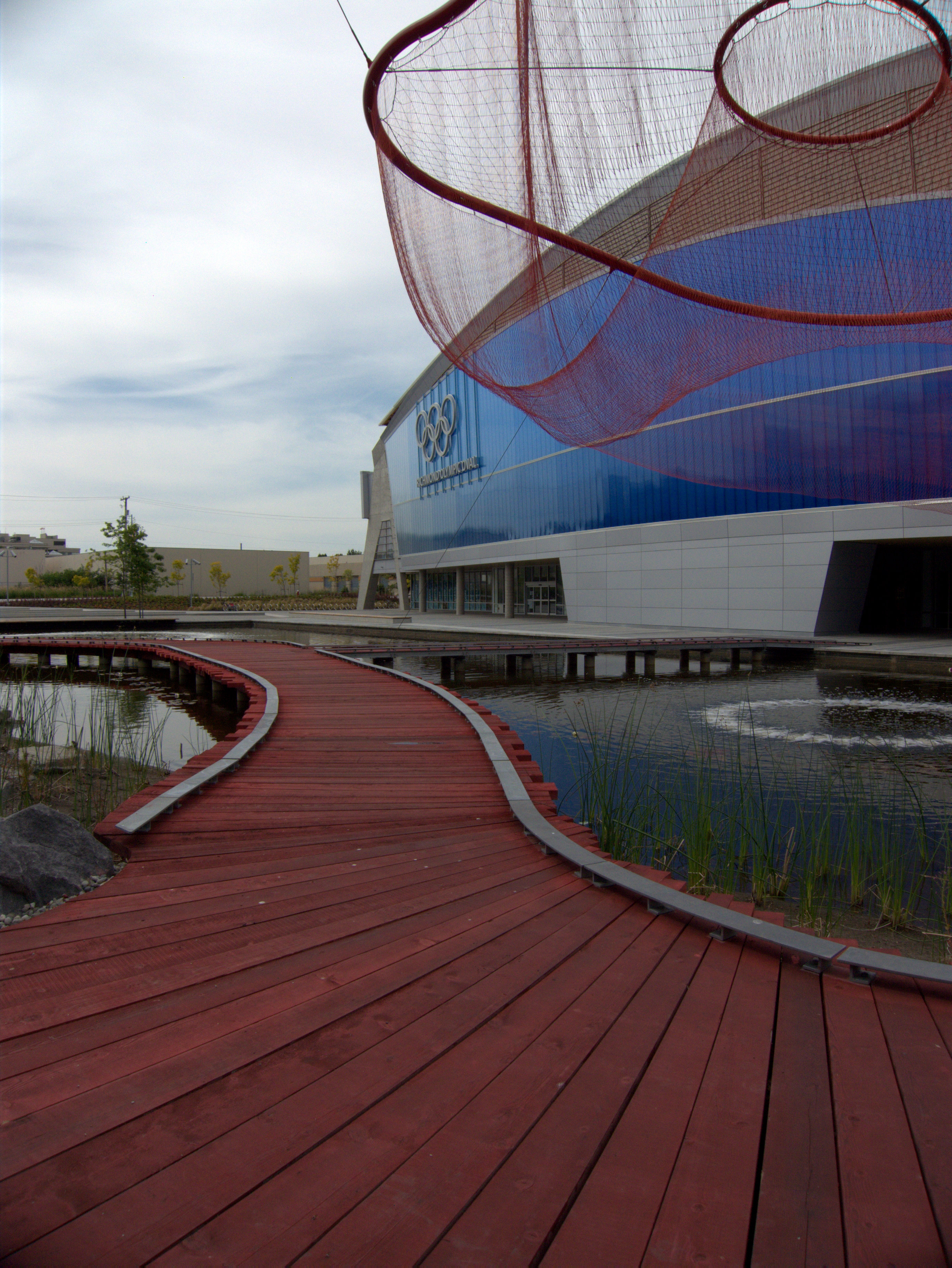
Exterior of the Richmond Olympic Oval with Water Sky Garden sculpture by artist Janet Echelman

Aspac Developments Ltd purchased 7.5 hectares (19 acres) of land adjacent to the Fraser River and the finished $178 million Richmond Olympic Oval. The $1 billion plan includes 16 high-density towers, up to 14 stories in height. The towers will be stepped toward the waterfront and will include trees and green space. Aspac's plans are for "probably the highest-end development Richmond has seen to date" said Mayor Brodie. A $2.3 million hard-surfaced path will be constructed along the river to link the project to Aberdeen Centre. Aspac's initial plan includes constructing the development in four phases, with the first phase consisting of 65,000 square metres (700,000 sq ft) of residential development, and 2,300 square metres (25,000 sq ft) of ground-level commercial space. Some construction will not begin until after 2010, and will take up to 12 years to complete. The warehouses and commercial parks near the development are also slated for redevelopment.

==== Capstan Village ====
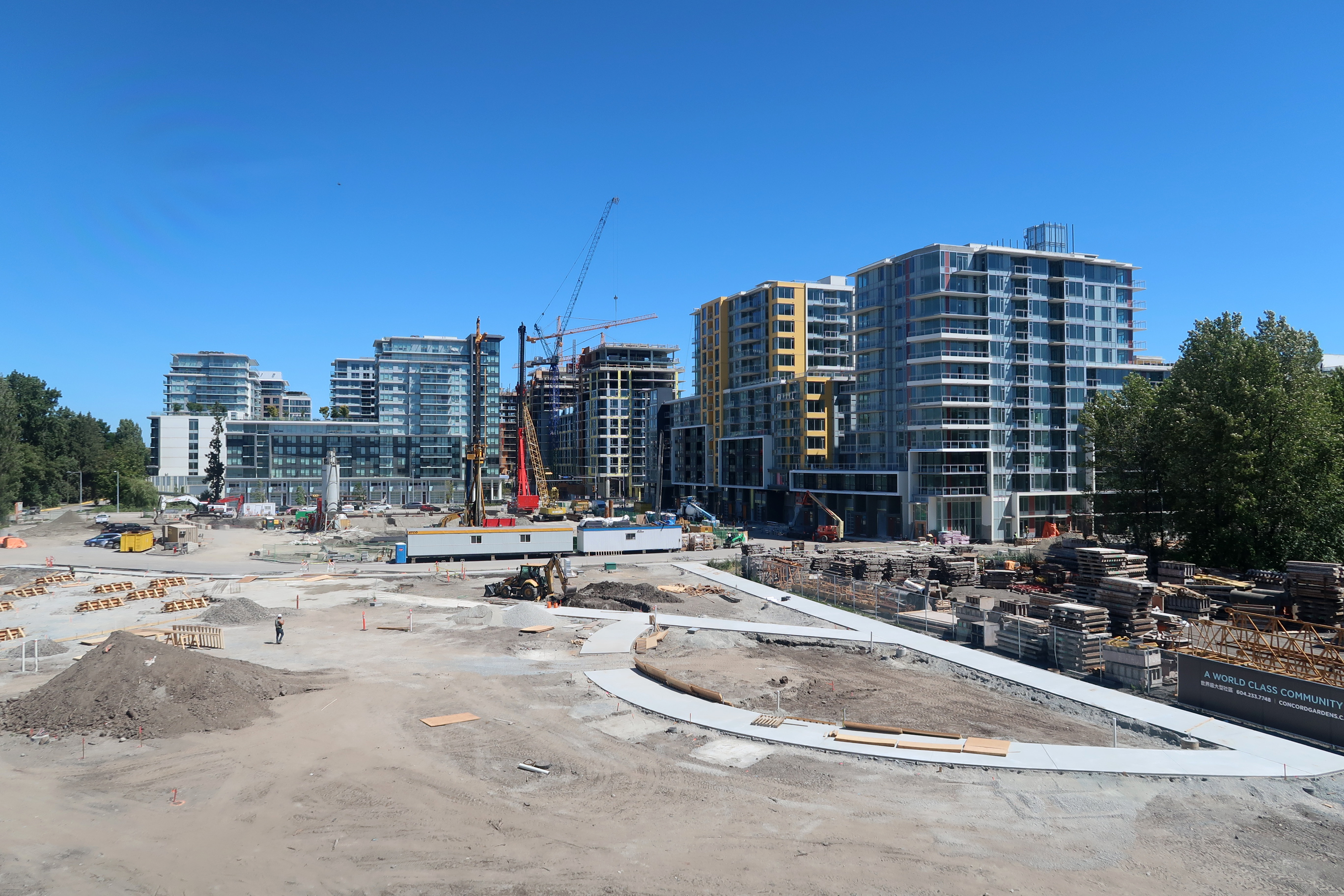
Capstan Way development in 2018

Developer Pinnacle International is planning a 16-building development on a seven-hectare (17-acre) property near Capstan Way and No 3 road. The mixed-use development would include over 2,100 residential units, various commercial uses, and a hotel.

The Canada Line is considered critical to the project. A fifth Richmond station at Capstan Way (No. 3 Road and Capstan Way) was originally planned, but was cancelled in March 2009. This station was considered so critical to the development that the City of Richmond has received $19 million from developers for the station to be built. TransLink, the Canada Line operator, started designing this station in November 2017. Construction started on Capstan station on September 2, 2021. On December 20, 2024, Capstan station opened to the public.

== Arts and culture ==
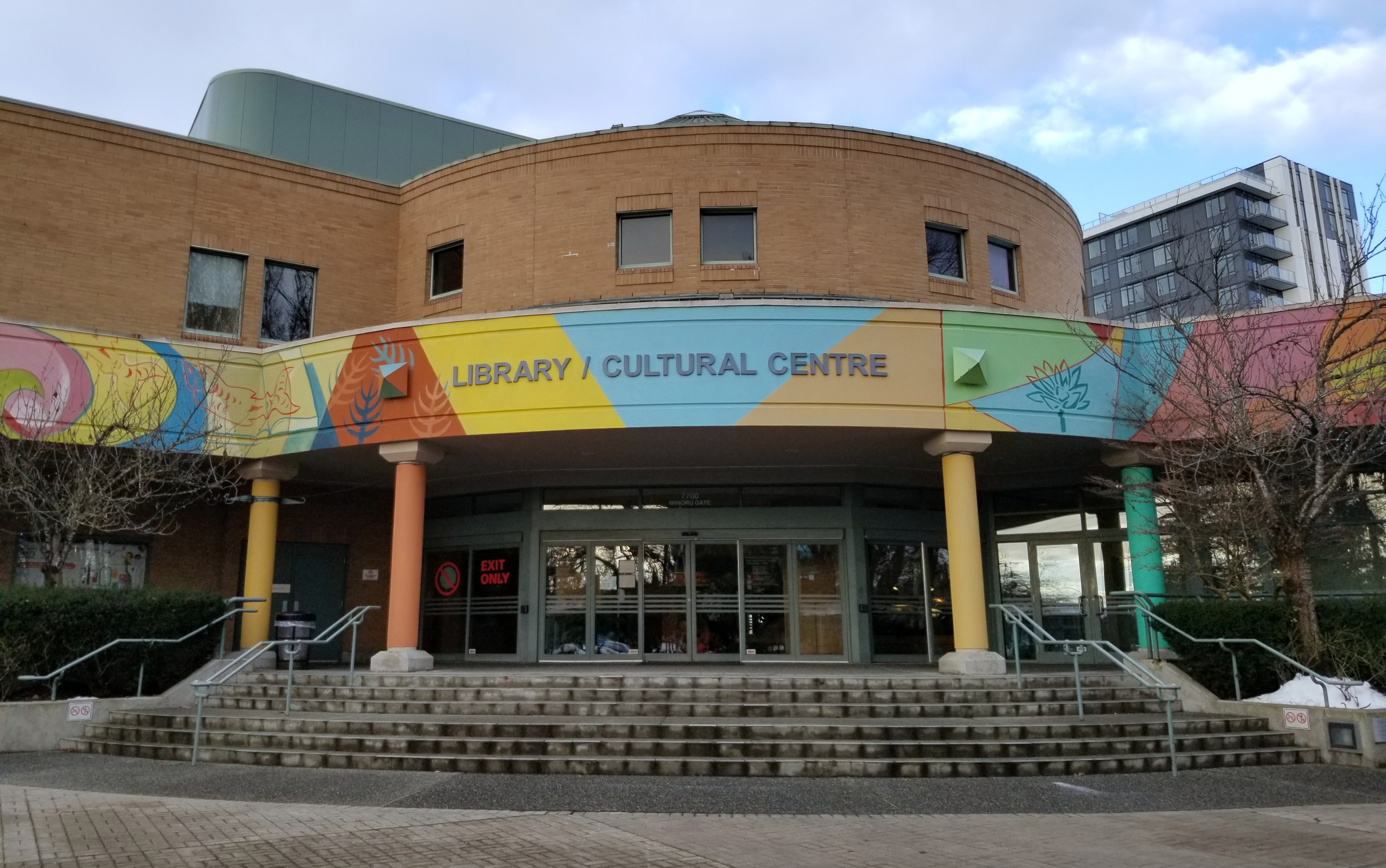
Richmond Cultural Centre and Library

=== Attractions ===
The Richmond Public Library has four branches across the city: Brighouse (Main), Ironwood, Cambie, Steveston. The library also operates a limited service in the Hamilton neighbourhood.

The Richmond Art Gallery is a contemporary art gallery located within the Richmond Cultural Centre in Minoru Park, showcasing the work of Canadian, Indigenous, and international artists.

The Richmond Museum, located next to the Richmond Art Gallery, hosts exhibitions and programming showcasing Richmond's past, present, and future.

=== Events ===
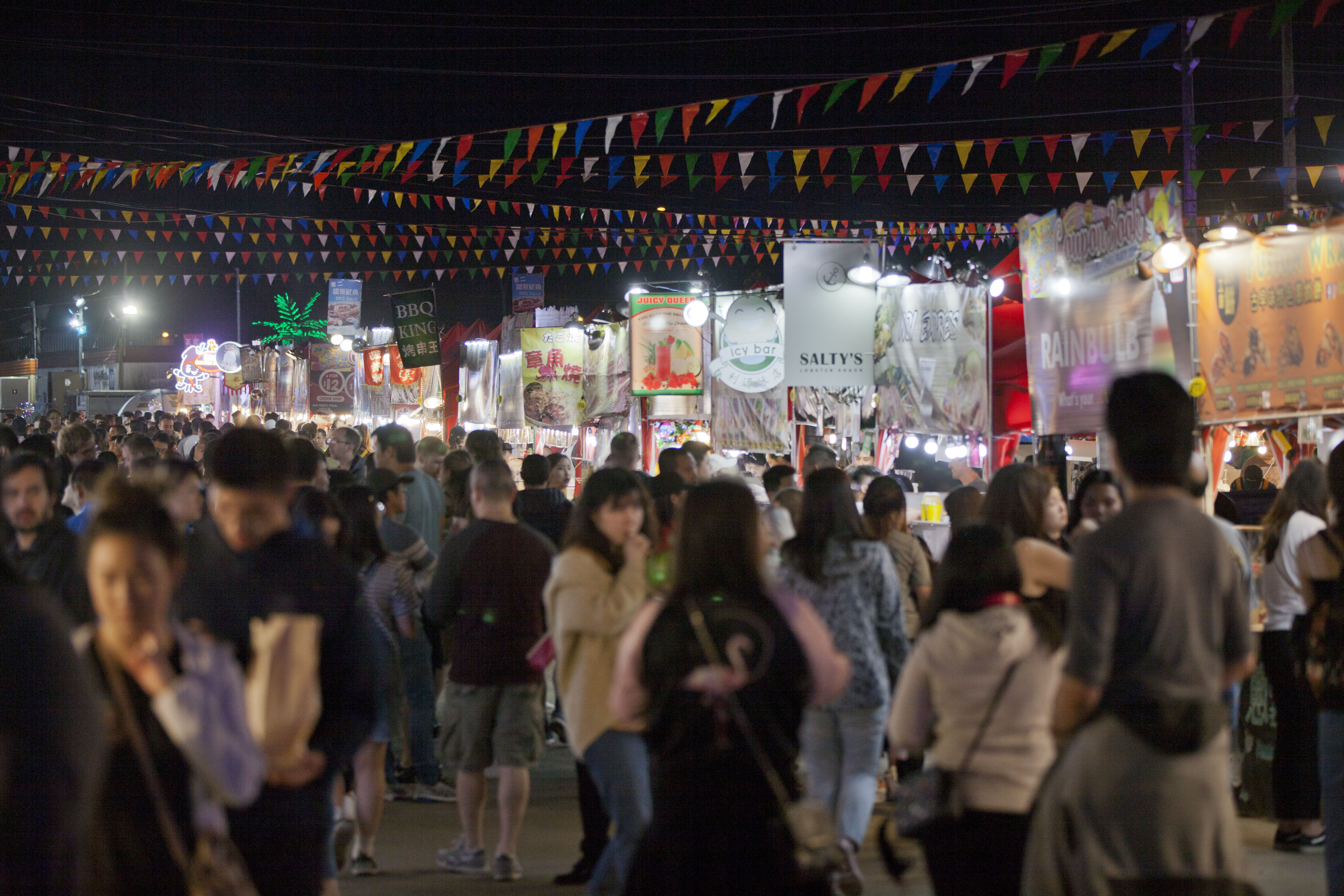
Richmond Night Market

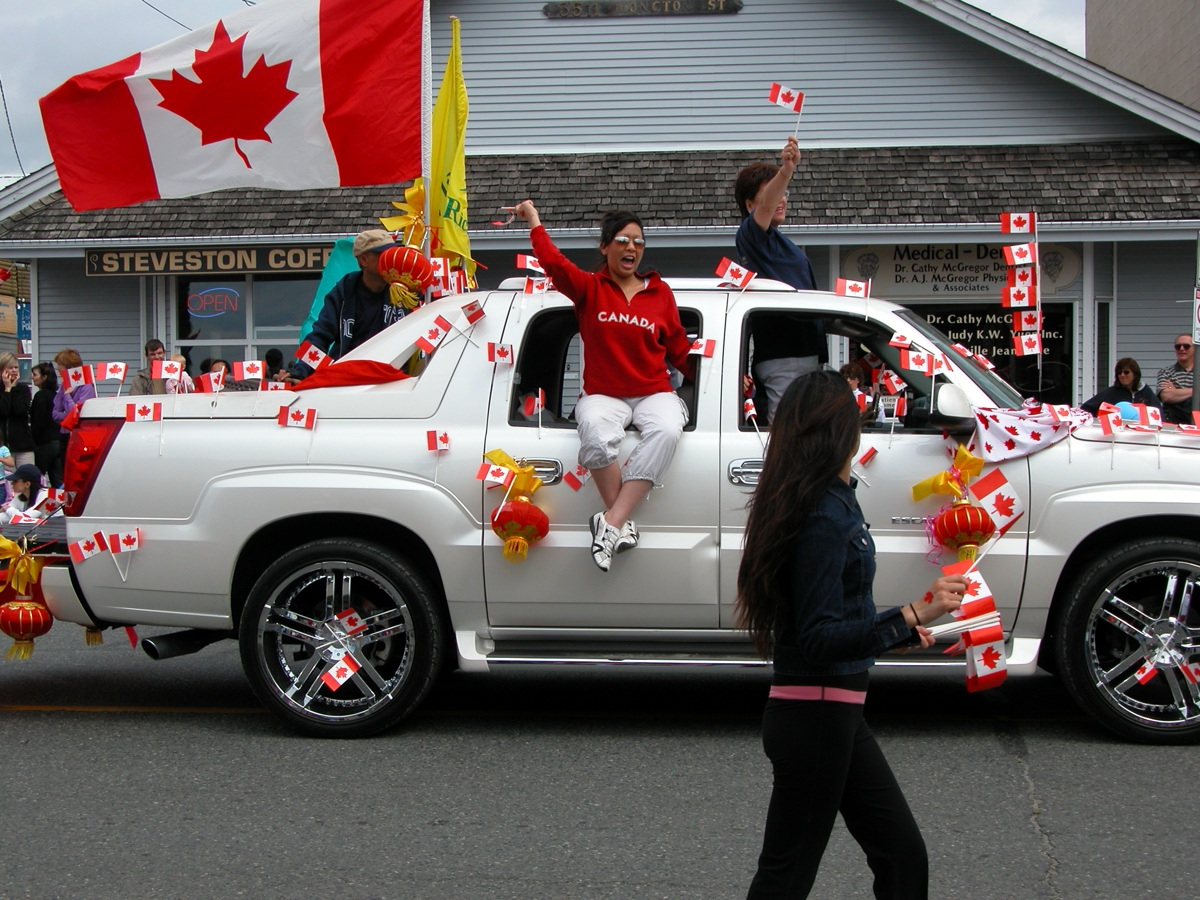
Steveston Salmon Festival

During summer weekends, the annual Richmond Night Market, North America's largest night market, draws crowds from across the region. Operated similarly to a typical Asian night market, visitors can find popular street food, toys, clothes, accessories, arcade games, and live entertainment.

On Canada Day, Richmond has an annual festival in Steveston called the Steveston Salmon Festival. This event includes a parade, various booths, food trucks, and a huge barbecued salmon sale in front of the Steveston Community Centre.

An annual Richmond Maritime Festival has been held at the Britannia Shipyard National Historic Site every August since 2004. It is a family event that celebrates the region's maritime heritage with live entertainment, ships, exhibits and demonstrations.

Many indoor and outdoor art exhibitions are hosted by Richmond Arts Coalition (RAC) throughout the year. The RAC hosts Richmond arts events, connects the public to artists and events, provides artist opportunities, nominate awards, funds performers to specific events, stimulates arts projects, and advocate for arts issues, performances, education, creation, and exhibition activities.

==== Past Notable Events ====
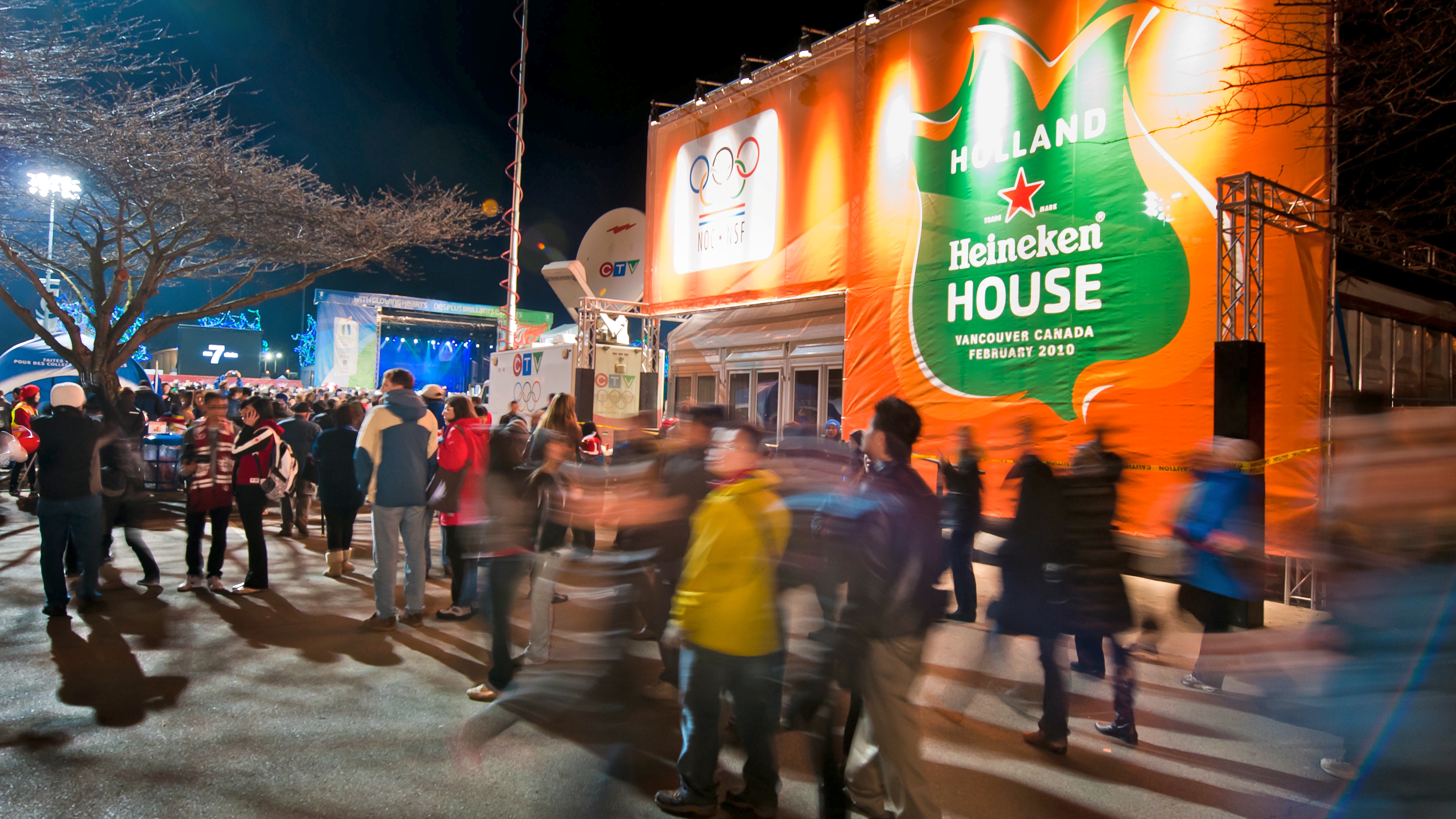
The Holland Heineken House in Minoru Arenas during the 2010 Olympic Games

In 2002, Richmond hosted a tall ships festival, which attracted an estimated 400,000 people to Steveston. Despite the event's popularity, there was a revenue shortfall and the city decided not to host the event again.

Richmond also hosted the 2006 Gemini Awards, which were held at River Rock Casino. This marked the first time the ceremony had taken place on the West Coast, as it traditionally takes place in Toronto.

During the 2010 Olympic Games, Richmond hosted an Olympic celebration zone called the O Zone at Minoru Park. The park featured outdoor viewing screens, stages for live performances, and various exhibitions. Minoru Arenas also hosted the Holland Heineken House, which included Dutch DJs and cultural events.

== Parks and recreation ==
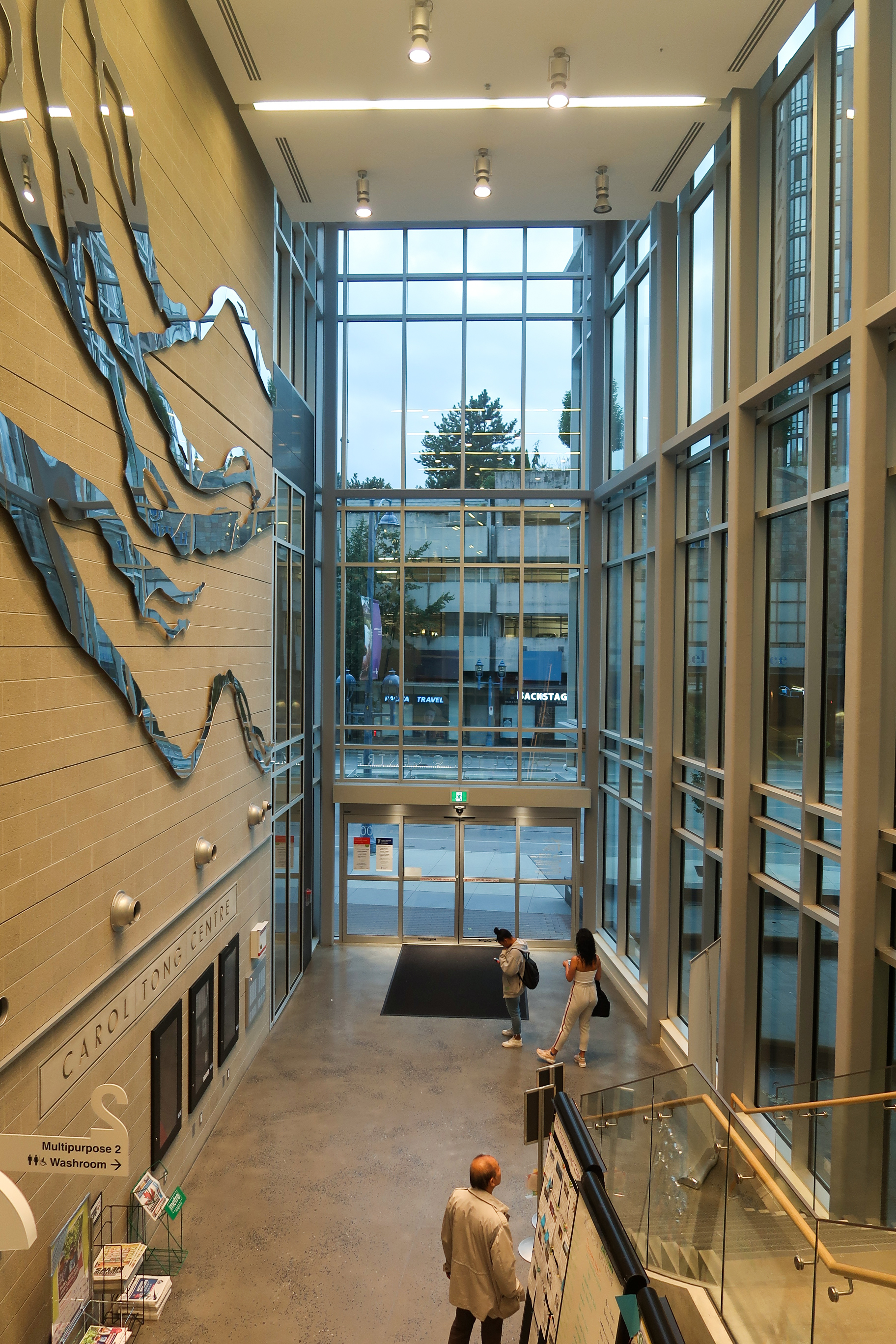
City Centre Community Centre

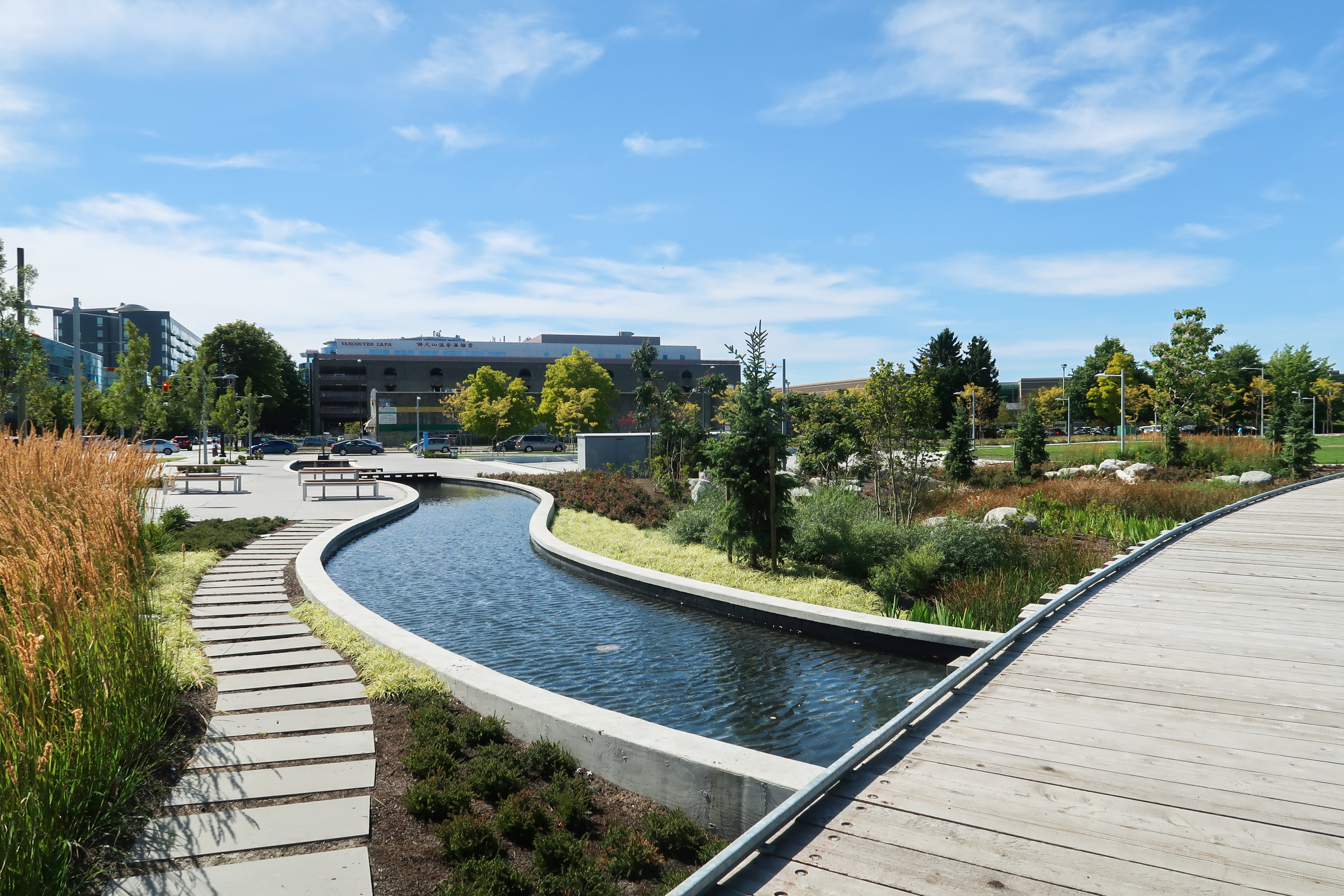
Aberdeen Park

The Richmond Parks System divides it's 140 public parks into three categories: City, Community, and Neighbourhood parks. Of these parks, the city has designated ten as signature parks. These include:

- Garden City Community Park
- Garden City Lands
- Garry Point Park
- Imperial Landing Park
- London Farm
- Middle Arm Waterfront Greenway Park
- Minoru Park
- Richmond Nature Park
- Terra Nova Rural Park
- Terra Nova Adventure Play Environment

There are 12 recreational facilities in Richmond. They offer a range of amenities, including but not limited to gyms, ice rinks, and pools. These facilities include:

- Cambie Community Centre
- City Centre Community Centre
- Hamilton Community Centre
- Minoru Arenas
- Minoru Centre for Active Living – Aquatic & Seniors Centre
- Richmond Ice Centre
- Sea Island Community Centre
- South Arm Community Centre
- Steveston Community Centre
- Thompson Community Centre
- Watermania
- West Richmond Community Centre

An extensive trail system provides 136 kilometres of recreational trails in parks and 87 kilometres of on-road cycling paths.

Richmond is also home to the Iona Beach Regional Park managed by Metro Vancouver. The park features a beach and a popular trail on top of a 4 km-long jetty that stretches into the Strait of Georgia.

== Sports ==
Richmond is home to the Richmond Sockeyes Junior B hockey team. It also hosts the BC Thunder of the National Ringette League. Richmond also has two swim clubs: the Kigoos summer swimming club and the Richmond Rapids Swim Club. Richmond also has multiple soccer teams, under the name Richmond FC, ranging in ages and skill levels, from U4's to U18's, and from house divisions to elite programming. As of 1 October 2006, the middle arm of Richmond's Fraser River became home to both the UBC Thunderbirds varsity rowing program and St. George's School rowing program, with the completion of the new $6 million CAD John M.S. Lecky UBC Boathouse. In addition, this facility will also function to enhance participation in the sports of rowing and dragon boating for the greater community, including youth, adults, and rowing alumni. Richmond also has their own short track speed skating club, the Richmond Rockets and their own rugby union club, the Richmond Rugby Football Club.

=== The 2010 Winter Olympics ===
For the 2010 Winter Olympics in Vancouver, the City of Richmond constructed an 8,000-seat speed-skating oval near the No. 2 Road Bridge, just across (the middle arm of) the Fraser River from Vancouver International Airport. The final construction cost (paid for by the city, the provincial government and the federal government) is around $178 million CAD. Since the completion of the Games, the oval has served as a recreational structure for local residents. The Richmond Oval officially opened on 12 December 2008. The city received $141 million CAD from ASPAC Developments for city-owned land next to the Oval. The sale more than covers the unfunded portion of the Oval's price tag.

== Government ==
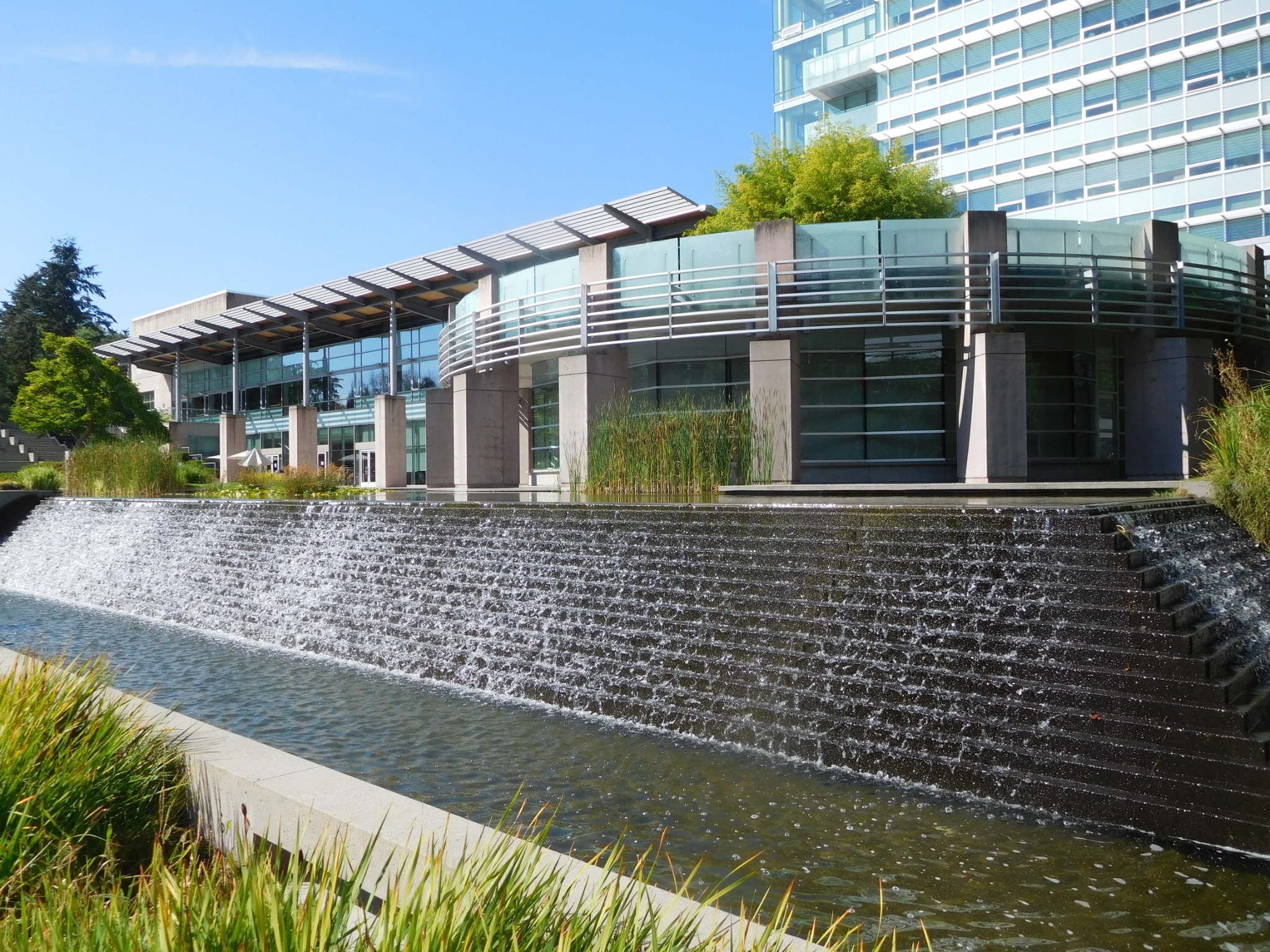
Richmond City Hall

=== Municipal ===
Richmond's municipal council is elected using an at-large electoral system. Like Vancouver, but unlike most municipalities in British Columbia, Richmond has a local political system based on municipal political parties that run slates of candidates. However, these organizations are generally weak and may dissolve or change names between elections.

Richmond's local government includes a nine-member city council and a seven-member school board. The city council comprises the mayor and eight councillors. As of May 2026, the current mayor of Richmond is Malcolm Brodie, who has served in the role since 2001.

In the 2018 municipal election, the Richmond Citizens' Association (RCA), Richmond First, and RITE Richmond each won two seats, while the Richmond Community Coalition won one seat, and one councillor was elected as an independent. On the Richmond Board of Education, the Richmond Education Party won three seats, Richmond First won two seats, and two trustees were elected as independents.

=== Provincial ===
In the Legislative Assembly of British Columbia, Richmond was historically a stronghold of the BC Liberals (known as BC United since 2023) until the 2020 provincial election, when the BC NDP won three of the city's four electoral districts: Richmond South Centre, Richmond-Queensborough, and Richmond-Steveston.

In the 2024 provincial election, Richmond Centre, Richmond-Bridgeport, and Richmond-Queensborough elected members of the BC Conservatives, while Richmond-Steveston elected a member of the BC NDP.

=== Federal ===
In the House of Commons of Canada, Richmond is divided between two electoral districts: Richmond Centre, which encompasses the central and western parts of the city, and Steveston—Richmond East, which encompasses the southern and eastern parts. In the 2021 federal election, the Liberal Party won both Richmond Centre and Steveston—Richmond East. In the 2025 federal election, Liberal MP Parm Bains was re-elected in Richmond East—Steveston, while Conservative candidate Chak Au was elected in Richmond Centre—Marpole.

== Infrastructure ==
=== Transportation ===
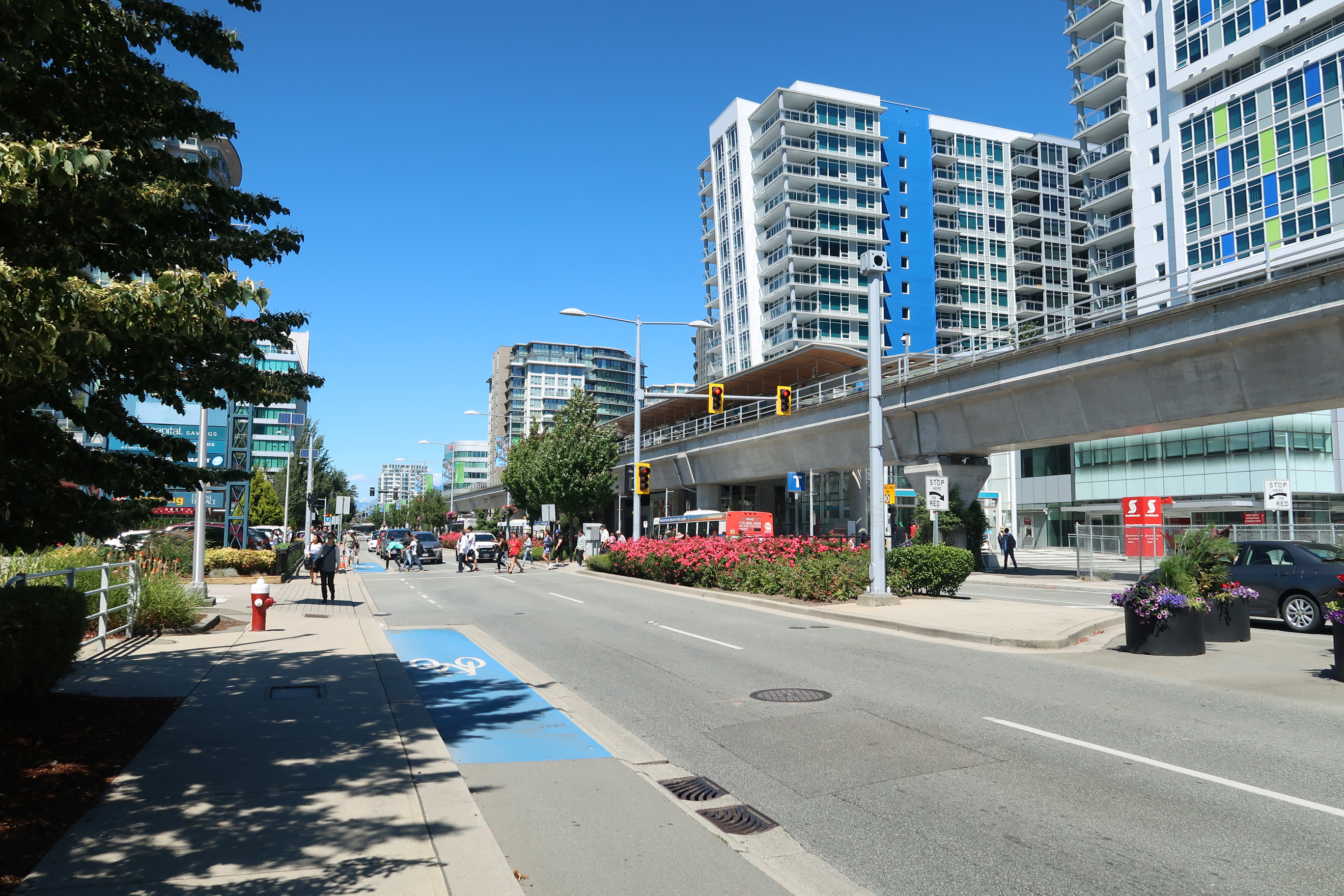
The Canada Line is Richmond's rapid transit service to Vancouver International Airport and Downtown Vancouver.

Richmond is connected by a system of bridges and tunnels to Vancouver and Delta, and through the New Westminster suburb of Queensborough (on eastern Lulu Island) to the Burrard Peninsula portion of New Westminster. The Dinsmore Bridge, the No. 2 Road Bridge, the transit-only Middle Arm Bridge, and the Moray Bridge twinned with the Sea Island Connector connect Lulu Island and Sea Island; the Arthur Laing Bridge connects Sea Island to Vancouver; the Oak Street Bridge, the Knight Street Bridge, and the transit-, pedestrian-, and cyclist-only North Arm Bridge connect Lulu Island to Vancouver; the Queensborough Bridge connects Queensborough (on eastern Lulu Island) to New Westminster; one bridge connects Queensborough to Annacis Island in Delta; one twinned bridge connects Richmond to Annacis Island; and the George Massey Tunnel, one of the few underwater tunnels in British Columbia connects Richmond to Delta.

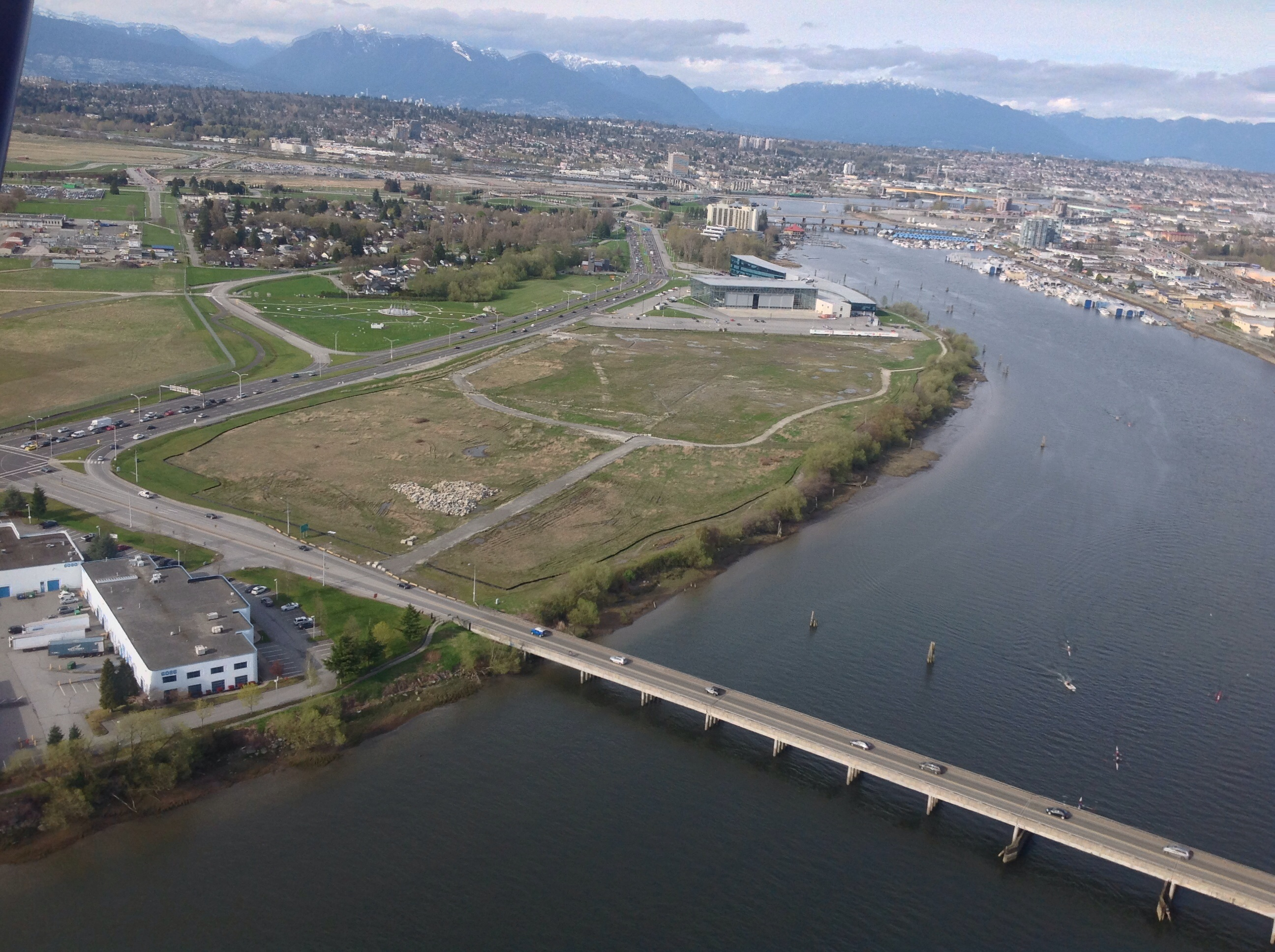
The Dinsmore Bridge (foreground) is one of three road connections between Lulu Island (at right) and Sea Island (at left).

Two freeways serve Richmond: Highway 99, which connects to Interstate 5 at the border with the United States, and Highway 91, which connects Delta, New Westminster, and Richmond.

Railway bridges connect Lulu Island to Vancouver, New Westminster, and Annacis Island, and serve the Canadian National and Canadian Pacific Railways, as well as the Southern Railway of British Columbia (although the latter railway's Lulu Island trackage is entirely within Queensborough).

Public transportation in Richmond is provided by TransLink, the regional transit authority for Metro Vancouver. The system provides direct bus and rail service from Richmond to Vancouver, Surrey, New Westminster, Burnaby, and Delta. The Canada Line is a SkyTrain rail line, connecting both Richmond and the airport to Downtown Vancouver and to points in between, opened on Monday, 17 August 2009. The Canada Line provides travel to Downtown Vancouver in 25 minutes with a frequency of 3 to 12 minutes, 20 hours per day. Major transit hubs include Richmond–Brighouse station, which serves as a hub for many Richmond bus routes, and Bridgeport station which serves as a hub for bus routes connecting to other municipalities. After the Canada Line closes at night, late-night service is provided by the N10 Nightbus every day of the week. The bus runs every 30 minutes, with the exception of one northbound trip (2 am – 3 am), during which service is at 60 minutes; service returns to 30 minutes after the northbound trip at 3 am.

A dockless bicycle-sharing system, consisting of e-bikes and e-scooters, was launched in the City Centre area in May 2022 by Lime.

Vancouver International Airport (YVR), located on Sea Island, which is part of Richmond, to the north of Lulu Island, provides most of the air access to the region. Several float plane companies (including Salt Spring Air, Harbour Air and Seair Seaplanes) operate from the south terminal, providing service to the Gulf Islands and Vancouver Island. The airport is the second busiest in Canada and one of the busiest international airports on the West Coast of North America.

=== Health care ===
Health care in Richmond is overseen by the Vancouver Coastal Health Authority.

Richmond Hospital, located on the southeast corner of Westminster Highway and Gilbert Road, is undergoing redevelopment. In 2018, the Ministry of Health approved an 8-floor acute care tower redevelopment plan to replace the aging north tower. On 2 July 2020, the provincial government announced the acute care tower concept plan was being updated, with an additional floor (9 total) and announcement of expanded and renewed ER, ICU, Pharmacy, along with renovations to the south tower to include more inpatient psychiatric beds along with a psych ER.

In addition to the hospital, Vancouver Coastal Health operates two Urgent and Primary Care Centres (UPCC) in the city, one in the City Centre and another in East Cambie.

The city is known internationally as the headquarters of the Canadian Hemochromatosis Society, and also as the city where the National Annual Hemochromatosis Awareness Month was initiated by former Mayor G. H. Blair in 1987.

=== Emergency services ===
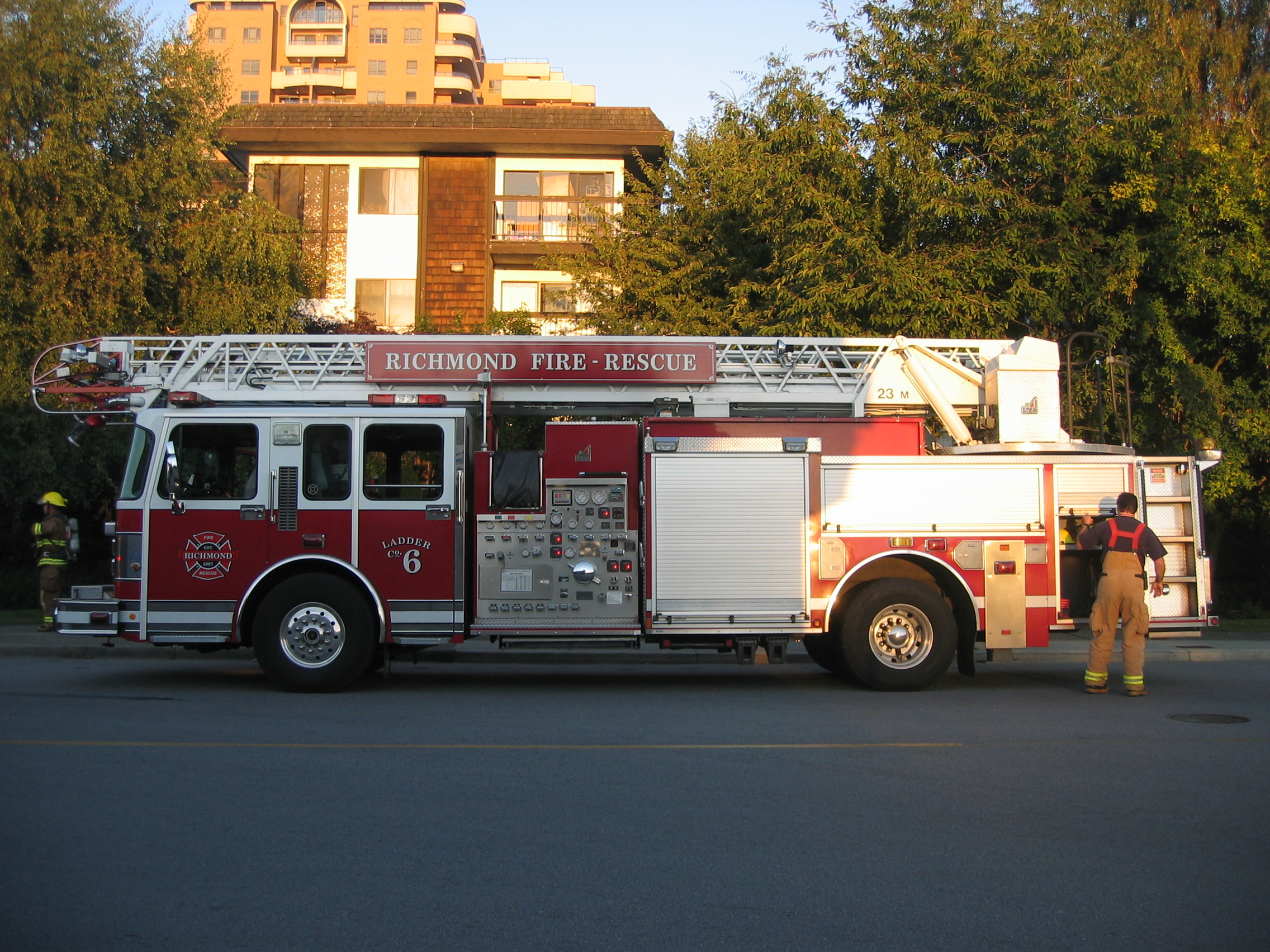
Richmond Fire-Rescue

The Richmond Fire-Rescue Department, established in 1897, is responsible for providing both fire and extrication services in Richmond. The department has seven fire halls and responds to fire rescue calls and medical emergencies. It also provides emergency services at Vancouver International Airport. There are fire stations located in City Centre, Steveston, Cambie, Sea Island, Hamilton, Shellmont, and Crestwood.

The City of Richmond utilizes the Royal Canadian Mounted Police as its primary form of municipal law enforcement, with their main detachment located on No. 5 Road in the Ironwood area. The Richmond RCMP also has community police stations located in City Centre, South Arm, and Steveston.

The British Columbia Ambulance Service provides the city with emergency medical response.

== Education ==
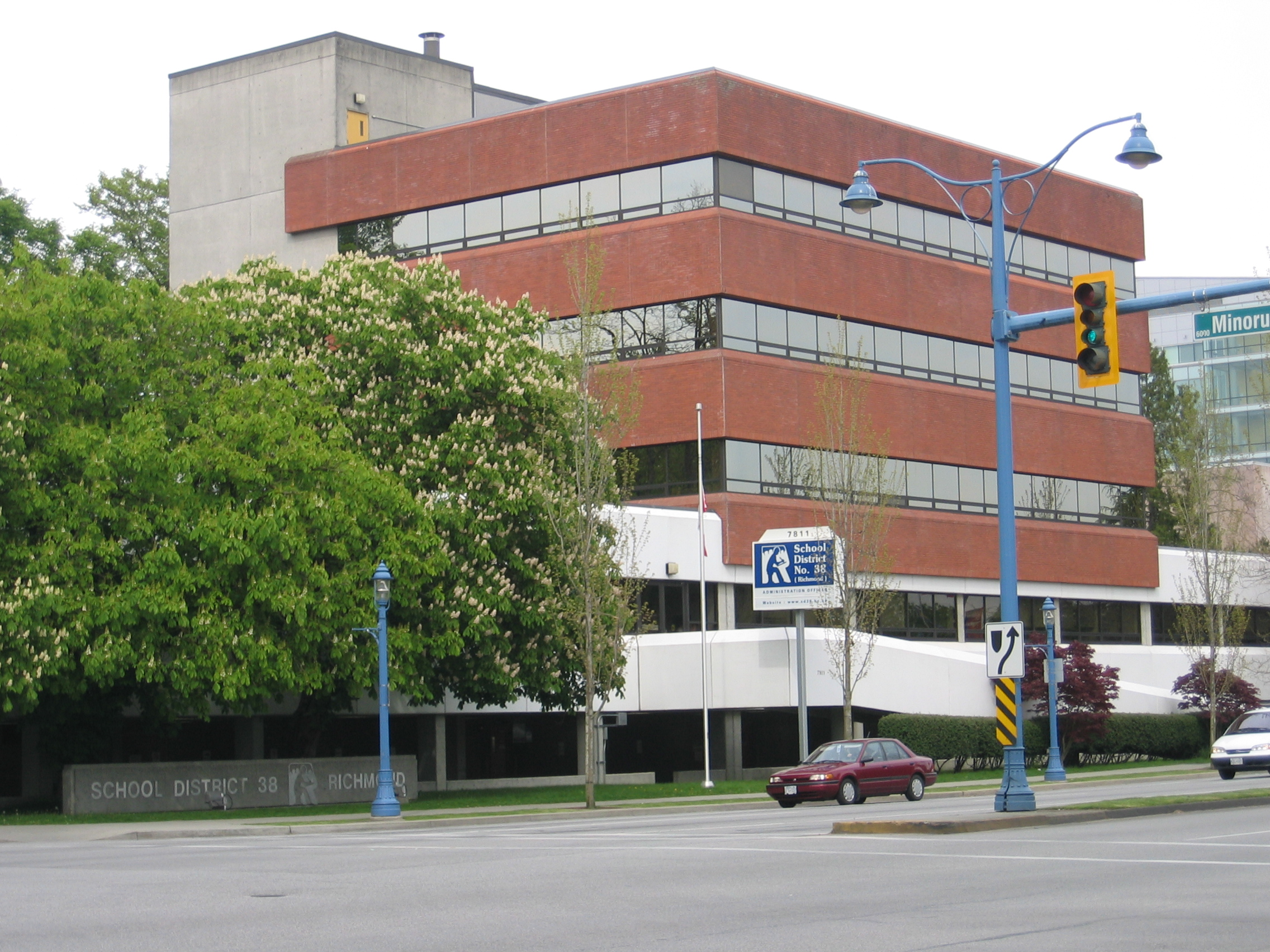
The head offices of the Richmond School District #38, on Granville Avenue

Richmond is home to a campus of Kwantlen Polytechnic University, Sprott Shaw College and Trinity Western University. The British Columbia Institute of Technology also runs an aerospace technology campus in Sea Island near Vancouver International Airport.

School District 38 Richmond oversees 10 public secondary schools and 38 public elementary schools, including three Montessori schools, two late French immersion schools, and six early French immersion schools. The district also hosts two International Baccalaureate programs, located at Richmond Secondary School and Hugh Boyd Secondary School.

The Conseil scolaire francophone de la Colombie-Britannique, headquartered in Richmond, operates one Francophone primary school in that city: école des Navigateurs.

Richmond is also home to a number of private schools providing K-12 education, including Richmond Christian School, Muslim School of British Columbia, St. Paul's Elementary School, St. Joseph the Worker Elementary School, Richmond Jewish Day School, Choice School for the Gifted and Exceptional, Cornerstone Christian Academy, Chaoyin Bilingual School, and previously Pythagoras Academy and Richmond International High School and College.

== Media ==
=== Radio production ===
The Indo-Canadian radio station Sher-E-Punjab has its headquarters in Richmond.

Two Chinese-Canadian radio stations providing news, traffic, and music are headquartered in Richmond. Fairchild Radio, headquartered in Aberdeen Centre, is a radio station with programming for both Mandarin and Cantonese speakers. CHMB AM1320, a radio station for Cantonese speakers, is headquartered in East Richmond.

Z95-3's studio is located in the Ironwood area of Richmond. The radio station provides Metro Vancouver listeners with hot adult contemporary, incorporating a mix of older songs with Top 40 hits.

=== Film and television production ===
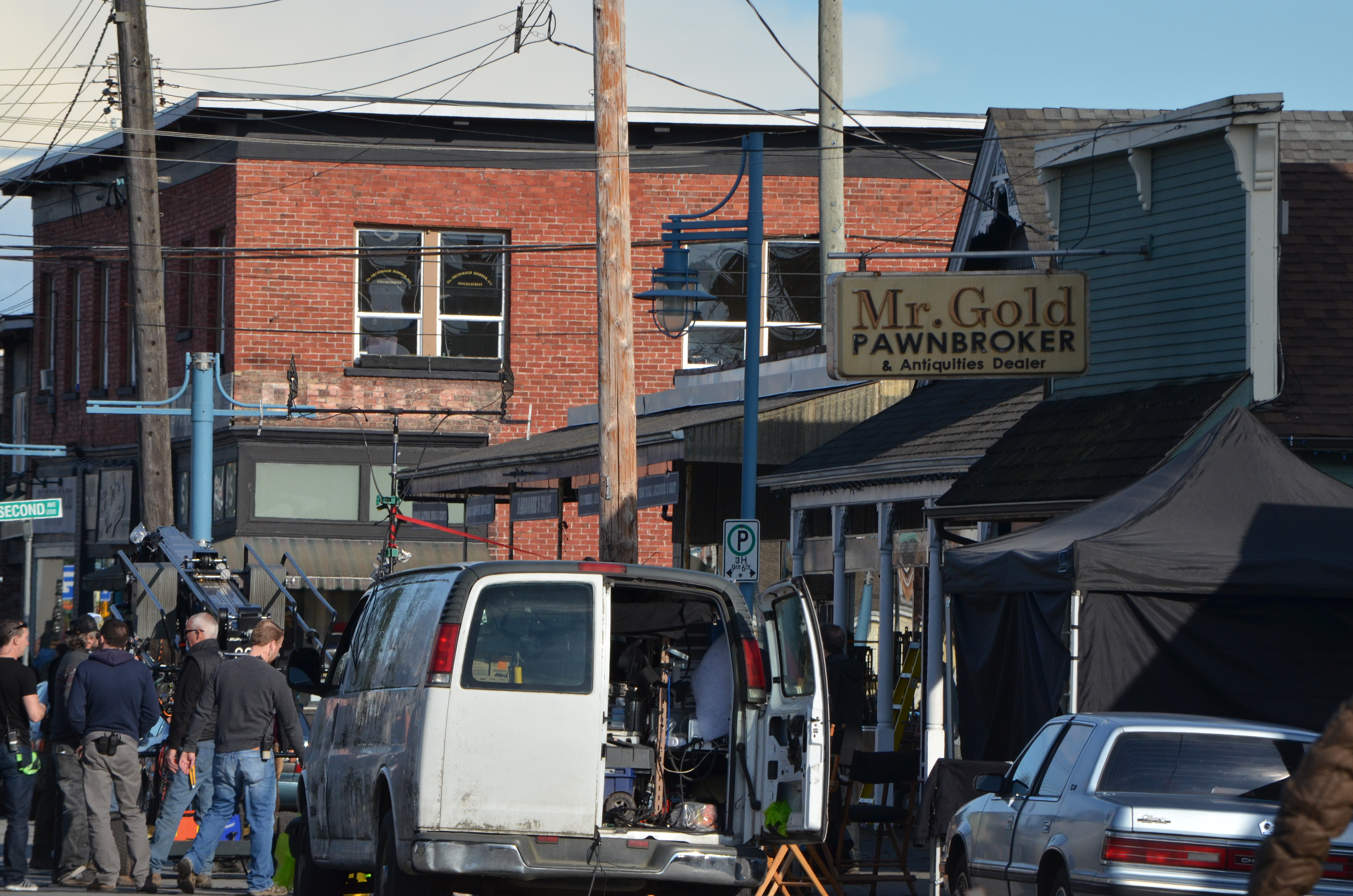
ABC's Once Upon a Time filming in Steveston Village.

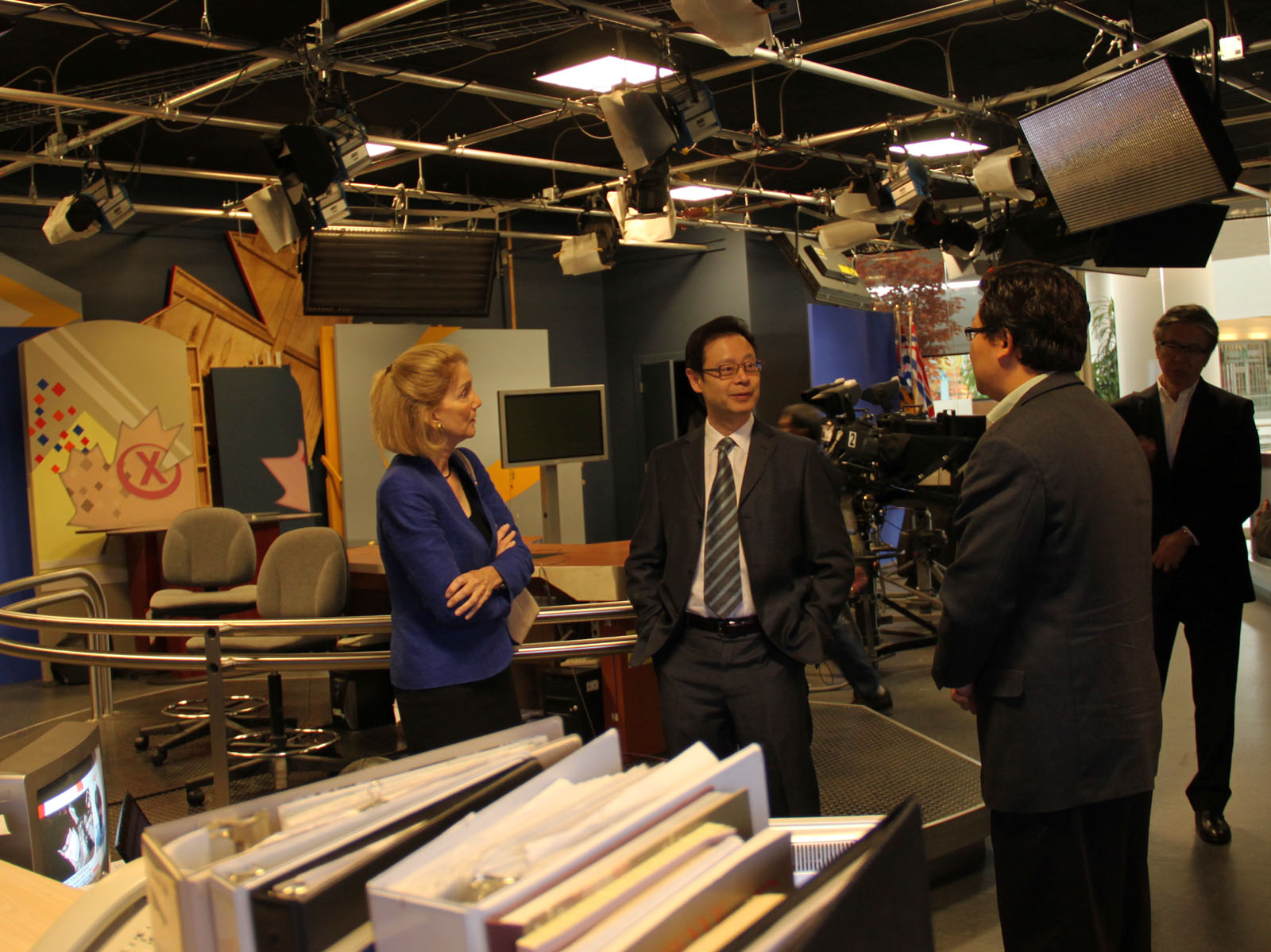
The Fairchild TV Newsroom located in Aberdeen Centre.

Steveston Village has played home to several major American movies such as Blade II and The 6th Day, and television series such as The X-Files, Supernatural, The Secret Circle, The Outer Limits, Killer Instinct, Smallville, Stargate SG-1, the Final Destination series and the Scary Movie series. It is also the location for the fictitious town of Storybrooke in the ABC TV series Once Upon a Time.

Fantasy Gardens (a now defunct amusement park) served as Halloweentown in the popular Disney Channel television movie Halloweentown II: Kalabar's Revenge and was also featured in the TV series Killer Instinct and Stargate SG-1. The television series Aliens in America and Life Unexpected also made use of Cambie Secondary School in the northern part of the city.

The exterior of the Workers' Compensation Board building (now the WorkSafeBC building) was used for the hospital in Stephen King's Kingdom Hospital. These exteriors can now be seen on the CBS series Eleventh Hour.

Vancouver International Airport on Richmond's Sea Island has also been featured in numerous films and television series, commonly standing in for Seattle-Tacoma International Airport (as it does in The Cleaner and Dead Like Me). It is also featured as stand-ins for other airports in films such as Final Destination, The Sisterhood of the Traveling Pants, The L Word, The Lizzie McGuire Movie, Fantastic Four: Rise of the Silver Surfer and Are We There Yet?

The Aerospace Technology Campus of BCIT, located just next to Vancouver International Airport, was used as a military academy mess hall for the live-action prequel series for the popular console game Halo 4 in Halo 4: Forward Unto Dawn. In addition, many other films, such as Rise of the Planet of the Apes and This Means War, were filmed there due to the directors taking a liking to the cement structure of the building, which makes for very official-looking sets.

Richmond serves as the Vancouver headquarters for the Fairchild Media Group which broadcasts Cantonese and Mandarin television channels from Aberdeen Centre. Their channels include Fairchild TV, Fairchild TV 2, and Talentvision.

== Sister cities ==
Richmond's sister cities are:

- Pierrefonds-Roxboro (Montreal), Canada (since 1967)
- Wakayama, Japan (since 1973)
- Xiamen, China (since 2012)

Since 2008, Richmond also has a friendship city relationship with Qingdao, China.

== Notable people ==
- Aaron Ashmore, actor
- Shawn Ashmore, actor
- Sonny Assu, artist
- Arjan Bhullar, wrestler
- Edison Chen, Hong Kong entertainer
- Nicki Clyne, actress
- Michael Craven, Sports executive, author
- Charlotte Diamond, Juno-winning children's singer
- Evan Dunfee, race walker and olympian.
- Gary Fung, founder and administrator of the BitTorrent index site Isohunt
- Shaul Gordon (born 1994), Canadian-Israeli Olympic sabre fencer
- David Grierson, radio host for CBC Radio
- Kyle Hamilton, Gold medal-winning Olympic rower
- Scott Hannan, professional NHL hockey player with the San Jose Sharks
- Rick Hansen, disability activist and former Paralympian
- Chris Haslam, professional skateboarder
- Rob Howard, politician
- Olga Ilich, former British Columbia MLA
- Manny Jacinto, actor
- Brian Johns, Olympic swimmer
- Jason Jordan, striker for the Vancouver Whitecaps
- Helen Kelesi, professional tennis player
- Alexa Loo, Olympic snowboarder
- Harvey Lowe, winner of the first World Yo-Yo Contest in 1932
- Megan McNamara, beach volleyball Player
- Nicole McNamara, beach volleyball Player
- James Paxton, Major League Baseball player
- Angus Reid, professional CFL football player with the BC Lions
- Coco Rocha, supermodel
- Camryn Rogers, Gold medal-winning Olympic hammer thrower
- Eli Schenkel (born 1992), American-born Canadian Olympic fencer
- Brent Seabrook, former professional NHL hockey player with the Chicago Blackhawks
- Bobby Singh, professional CFL football player with the BC Lions
- Troy Stecher, professional NHL hockey player with the Toronto Maple Leafs
- Ryan Stiles, comedian
- Brittany Tiplady, teen actress
- Bjarni Tryggvason, astronaut
- Bill Vander Zalm, former Premier of British Columbia

== See also ==
- Architecture of Greater Vancouver
- Flag of Richmond, British Columbia
