= Thompson, Richmond =

Thompson
- Neighbourhood
- Location of Thompson in Richmond

- Location in Metro Vancouver
- Coordinates: 49.170115°N 123.181190°W
- Country: Canada
- Province: British Columbia
- City: Richmond

Area
  - Total: 4.78 km^{2} (1.85 sq mi)

Population (2021)
  - Total: 14,955
  - Density: 3,129/km^{2} (8,100/sq mi)
- Forward sortation area: V7C

Thompson is a residential neighbourhood located in Richmond, British Columbia. The neighbourhood is bounded by the Strait of Georgia in the west, the Fraser River in the north, No. 2 Road and Gilbert in the east, and Granville Avenue in the south.

== History ==
=== The Terra Nova lands ===
The northwestern sector of the neighborhood is historically defined by the Terra Nova lands along the Middle Arm of the Fraser River. Prior to European settlement, Coast Salish peoples utilized this waterfront area as a seasonal fishing camp called Spul'u'kwuks. In the late 1880s, fishermen from Newfoundland claimed the area and named it "Terra Nova" (Latin for New Land). It quickly developed into a dense industrial salmon-canning hub, anchored by the Alliance Cannery and the Terra Nova Cannery (established in 1892), which drew a diverse workforce of Japanese, Chinese, European, and First Nations laborers. Following the decline of the canning industry, the municipality preserved this historic waterfront, transforming it into the Terra Nova Rural Park.

=== Early infrastructure and agriculture ===
Because the low-lying interior consisted of saturated peat bogs and muddy soils, early settlement was isolated along the perimeter riverbanks. To connect these remote river operations and early farms to regional transit points, a dedicated coach line called the Vancouver, Eburne and Terra Nova Stage was established, running directly through the area to transport passengers, mail, and local produce. Internal settlement only became viable after the construction of perimeter dikes and a network of deep drainage ditches dug along the section lines to lower the high water table.

=== Post-war suburbanization and modern development ===
Following World War II, a population boom caused neighbourhood landowners to gradually subdivide their larger farm plots for residential use, sparking a wave of wholesale single-family subdivision projects that began in the 1950s. A key local catalyst for this early suburban growth was the purchase of the Thompson farm on River Road under the federal Veterans' Land Act (VLA). This property was subdivided into one-acre parcels for sale to returning servicemen; land was set aside for a neighbourhood park, and a leftover half-acre site was donated by the VLA to construct a local community building.

Over the subsequent decades, intense residential building booms systematically converted the remaining agricultural holdings into dense single-family subdivisions. To serve this newly consolidated, dense single-family suburban population, commercial infrastructure was established at the intersection of Westminster Highway and No. 1 Road. In 1999, the Terra Nova Village shopping centre opened featuring a West Coast contemporary wood and timber design. The 71,800-square-foot open-air commercial hub is anchored by Save-On-Foods and Dollarama, serving as the retail core for the surrounding modern enclaves of townhomes and low-rise apartments.

== Demographics ==
The 2021 census found that English was spoken as mother tongue by 44.0% of the population. The next most common mother tongue language was Mandarin, spoken by 21.1% of the population, followed by Cantonese at 18.3%.

Panethnic groups in the Thompson neighbourhood (2021)
Panethnic group	2021
Panethnic group	%
East Asian (Note: Statistic includes total responses of "Chinese", "Korean", and "Japanese" under visible minority section on census.)	62.4%
European (Note: Statistic includes all persons that did not make up part of a visible minority or an indigenous identity.)	18.3%
Southeast Asian (Note: Statistic includes total responses of "Filipino" and "Southeast Asian" under visible minority section on census.)	6%
South Asian	6.8%
Middle Eastern (Note: Statistic includes total responses of "West Asian" and "Arab" under visible minority section on census.)	1.7%
Latin American	1.1%
African	0.6%
Other/multiracial (Note: Statistic includes total responses of "Visible minority, n.i.e." and "Multiple visible minorities" under visible minority section on census.)	2.9%
Total population	100%
Note: Totals greater than 100% due to multiple origin responses

== Transportation ==
Private vehicles are the primary mode of transportation in the suburban neighborhood of Thompson, with 73.6% of residents commuting to work as drivers and 8.2% as passengers. Public transit accounts for 12.1% of work commutes, while active transportation modes remain low, with 4.1% of the population walking and 0.9% cycling to their employment.

=== Public Transport ===
Public transit in Thompson is managed by TransLink, which operates several local bus routes through the neighborhood, including the 401, 406, 407, and 414. These routes provide direct connections to major municipal commercial centers and transit hubs like Brighouse and Steveston, as well as rapid transit access to the broader region via the Canada Line SkyTrain network.

=== Cycling ===
Thompson features a grid of designated bike routes that accommodate local commuting and recreational rides. These include the Middle Arm Trail, West Dyke Trail, Crabapple Ridge, Railway Greenway, Lynas Lane route, and the Granville Ave route.

== Education ==
The Thompson area is home to three elementary schools:

- William Bridge Elementary School
- Spul’u’kwuks Elementary School
- Thompson Elementary School
- Blair Elementary School

As well as one secondary school:

- J.N. Burnett Secondary School

== Parks and Recreation ==
Thompson is served by Thompson Community Centre, a central hub for local recreation.

The neighbourhood features numerous green spaces, anchored by Terra Nova Rural Park, Terra Nova Natural Area, and the West Dyke and Middle Arm Trail. Thompson/Burnett Community Park provides several athletic fields and courts for the neighbourhood.

In addition to joint-use school grounds, Thompson is lined with smaller neighbourhood parks, including Dover, McCallan, Gibbons VLA, Terra Nova South Parks.

A private golf course, the Quilchena Golf and Country Club, is in this neighbourhood.
