= Flag of Richmond, British Columbia =

Canadian municipal flag

Richmond, British Columbia
- Use: Municipal
- Adopted: April 12, 1986
- Design: Thick border with middle shield depicting three Pacific salmon

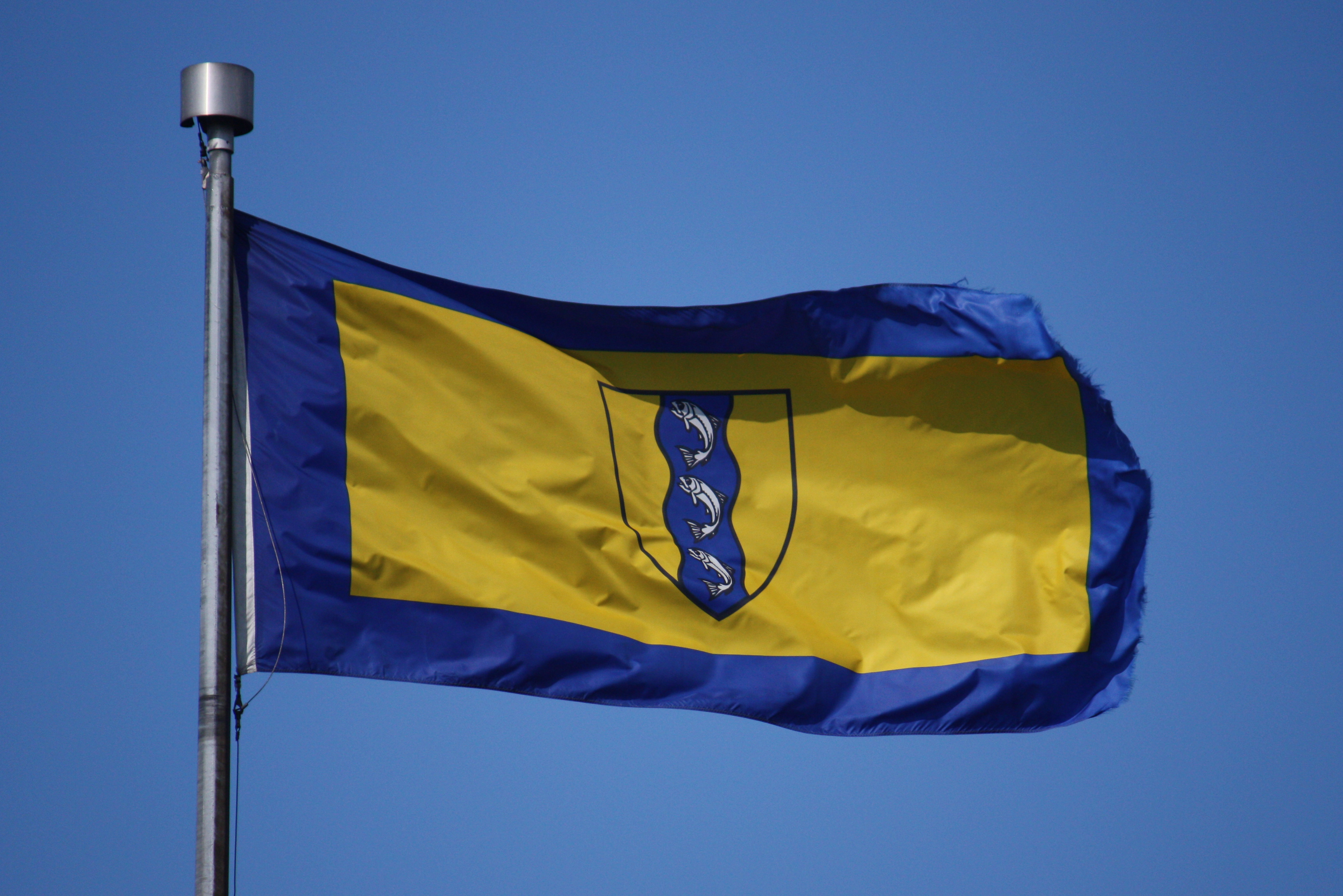
The flag flying at Vancouver International Airport

The flag of Richmond, British Columbia, depicts a field of gold surrounded by a thick blue border. In the centre of the field is a shield (the escutcheon of the coat of arms of the city of Richmond), depicting three Pacific Salmon fish on a light blue wave running vertically down the shield.

Municipal Council first asked staff to prepare a report on the design of a civic flag on July 22, 1985, after receiving a letter from a local flag manufacturer. A coat of arms had been adopted on November 10, 1979, to commemorate the centennial anniversary of Richmond's incorporation as a municipality. The new flag debuted at the opening of Brighouse Park on April 12, 1986.

The design of the flag is based on Richmond's coat of arms. The official description of the coat of arms as used in the program for the coat of arms presentation ceremony of November 10, 1979, identifies blue and gold as the "accepted colours for Richmond." The inner design of the flag represents the shield on the coat of arms. The statement of significance of the coat of arms states: "The shield is coloured gold, with the wavy pale bar in blue, and three Pacific Salmon thereon in natural colour – silver. The blue bar represents the Fraser River and the delta waters that surround Richmond. The salmon are representative of the most common species that abound in the waters around the municipality. The salmon relate also to the strong historic and continuing association with the fishing industry, responsible for the early prosperity and growth of the community and very much evident in the present day economy of Richmond."
