= Index of British Columbia–related articles =

The location of British Columbia in Canada

The following is an alphabetical list of articles related to the Canadian province of British Columbia.

== 0-9 ==
- 1700 Cascadia earthquake
- 1898 British Columbia general election
- 1900 British Columbia general election
- 1903 British Columbia general election
- 1907 British Columbia general election
- 1909 British Columbia general election
- 1912 British Columbia general election
- 1916 British Columbia general election
- 1920 British Columbia general election
- 1924 British Columbia general election
- 1928 British Columbia general election
- 1933 British Columbia general election
- 1937 British Columbia general election
- 1941 British Columbia general election
- 1945 British Columbia general election
- 1949 British Columbia general election
- 1952 British Columbia general election
- 1953 British Columbia general election
- 1954 British Empire and Commonwealth Games
- 1956 British Columbia general election
- 1960 British Columbia general election
- 1963 British Columbia general election
- 1966 British Columbia general election
- 1969 British Columbia general election
- 1972 British Columbia general election
- 1975 British Columbia general election
- 1979 British Columbia general election
- 1983 British Columbia general election
- 1986 British Columbia general election
- 1991 British Columbia general election
- 1996 British Columbia general election
- 2001 British Columbia general election
- 2005 British Columbia general election
- 2006 Central Pacific cyclone
- 2009 British Columbia general election
- 2010 Winter Olympics
- 2010 Winter Paralympics
- 2012 Valley First Crown of Curling
- 2013 British Columbia general election
- 2013 Kamloops Crown of Curling
- 2017 British Columbia general election
- 2017 Kamloops Crown of Curling
- 2020 British Columbia general election

== A ==
- Agricultural Land Reserve
- Air pollution in British Columbia
- APEC Canada 1997
- Alaska Boundary Dispute
- Alberni-Clayoquot Regional District
- Alberni Inlet
- Alberni Valley
- Alexandria First Nation
- Anahim Lake
- Anderson Lake (British Columbia)
- Barbara Andrews (bishop)
- Anglican Diocese of New Westminster
- Annacis Island
- Omer Arbel
- Atlin, British Columbia
- Janet Austin

== B ==
- Baillie-Grohman Canal
- Marilyn Baptiste
- Barkerville
- Dave Barrett
- BC Bud
- BC Council for Families
- BC Ferries
- BC Geographical Names
- BC Hydro
- BC Legislature Raids
- BC Lions
- BC Place
- BC Rail
- BC Sports Hall of Fame
- Beacon Hill Park
- Robert Beaven
- Bill Bennett
- W. A. C. Bennett
- Big Bend Country
- Andrew Bilesky
- Boat Encampment
- Bocci
- Boundary Bay
- William John Bowser
- Brentwood Bay, British Columbia
- Chartres Brew
- Harlan Carey Brewster
- Bridge River
- Bridgeview, Surrey
- British Columbia Aviation Museum
- British Columbia Coast
- British Columbia Conservative Party
- British Columbia Court of Appeal
- British Columbia dollar
- British Columbia Ferry Corporation
- British Columbia Forest Practices Board
- British Columbia Highway 1
- British Columbia Highway 5
- British Columbia Highway 17A
- British Columbia Highway 20
- British Columbia Highway 93
- British Columbia Highway 95
- British Columbia Highway 99
- British Columbia Hockey League
- British Columbia Interior
- British Columbia Liberal Party
- British Columbia Parliament Buildings
- British Columbia Social Credit Party
- British Columbia Railway
- British Columbia Resources Investment Corporation
- British Columbia Summer Swimming Association
- British Columbia Terms of Union
- British Columbia Treaty Process
- British Columbia Utilities Commission
- British Columbia Unity Party
- British Columbia Youth Parliament
- Corryn Brown
- Burnaby
- Burns Lake
- Burrard Inlet
- Butchart Gardens

== C ==
- Cache Creek, British Columbia
- Iona Campagnolo
- Kim Campbell
- Gordon Campbell
- Canada–United States border
- Canadian Pacific Railway
- Canal Flats
- Canal Flats Provincial Park
- Cannabis in British Columbia
- Capilano River
- Capital Regional District
- Cariboo
- Cariboo District
- Cariboo Gold Rush
- Cariboo Land District
- Cariboo Mountains
- Cariboo Plateau
- Cariboo Road
- Carrier-Chilcotin Tribal Council
- Cascadia (bioregion)
- Cascadia (independence movement)
- Cascadia subduction zone
- Cassiar, British Columbia
- Cassiar Land District
- Centerm
- Central City (Surrey, British Columbia)
- Central Saanich, British Columbia
- Chemainus
- Chemainus River
- Mike Chernoff (curler)
- Chief Hunter Jack
- Chilcotin Country
- Chilcotin District
- Chilcotin language
- Chilcotin River
- Chilcotin War
- Chilko Lake
- Chilko River
- Chimney Rock (Canada)
- Chinatown, Victoria
- Christ Church Cathedral (Victoria, British Columbia)
- Christy Clark
- Glen Clark
- Clayoquot Sound
- Clayoquot Sound Biosphere Reserve
- Clayoquot Sound Central Region Board
- Clear Range
- Clearwater River (British Columbia)
- Cloverdale, Surrey
- Coast Mountains
- Coast Salish
- Coat of Arms of British Columbia
- Coat of arms of Vancouver
- Coat of arms of Victoria, British Columbia
- College of New Caledonia
- Colony of British Columbia (1866–1871)
- Colony of Vancouver Island
- Columbia District
- Columbia Lake
- Columbia Mountains
- Columbia River
- Colwood, British Columbia
- Comox-Strathcona Regional District
- Comox Valley Regional District
- Conservation status of British Columbia salmonids
- Continental Newspapers
- Jim Cotter (curler)
- Douglas Coupland
- Courtenay, British Columbia
- William George Cox
- David Crawley (bishop)
- Raymond Culos
- Current Swell

== D ==
- D'Arcy Island
- Dakelh
- Alexander Edmund Batson Davie
- Theodore Davie
- Dayglo Abortions
- Amor De Cosmos
- Adam de Pencier
- Ralph Dean
- Deas Island
- John Deighton
- Delta, British Columbia
- Democratic Reform British Columbia
- Grant Dezura
- Diocese of British Columbia
- Diocese of Caledonia
- Diocese of Cariboo
- Diocese of Kootenay
- Discovery Islands
- Ujjal Dosanjh
- Doug flag
- Douglas First Nation
- James Douglas (governor)
- Douglas Ranges
- Douglas Road
- Douglas Street
- Downtown Vancouver
- Frederick Du Vernet
- James Dunsmuir
- Robert Dunsmuir
- Dutch Creek Hoodoos

== E ==
- East Vancouver
- Ecclesiastical Province of British Columbia and Yukon
- Andrew Charles Elliott
- English Bay, Vancouver
- Esquimalt
- Esquimalt (electoral district)
- Esquimalt Harbour
- Esquimalt-Metchosin
- Esquimalt-Royal Roads
- Executive Council of British Columbia
- Expo 86
- Expo Line (SkyTrain)

== F ==
- Fairmont Hot Springs, British Columbia
- False Creek
- Financial District, Vancouver
- Finlayson Channel
- Flag of British Columbia
- Flag of Richmond, British Columbia
- Flag of Vancouver
- Flag of Vancouver Island
- Flag of Victoria, British Columbia
- Fleetwood, Surrey
- Flora Bank
- Rick Folk
- Forest Renewal BC
- Fort Chilcotin
- Fort St. James
- Dean Fortin
- Allan Fotheringham
- Fountain, British Columbia
- Francis Peninsula
- Francis Point Provincial Park
- Franco-Columbians
- Fraser Canyon
- Fraser Canyon Gold Rush
- Fraser Lowland
- Fraser River

== G ==
- Gabriola Island
- Galiano Island
- Garibaldi Provincial Park
- Gastown
- Gateway station (SkyTrain)
- Sean Geall
- Geography of British Columbia
- Georgia Depression
- Brent Giles
- Glacier Media
- Golden Hinde (mountain)
- Goldstream Provincial Park
- Goldstream River (Vancouver Island)
- Good Hope Lake
- Government House, British Columbia
- Government of British Columbia
- Paul Gowsell
- Granby River
- Grand Forks, British Columbia
- Granville, British Columbia
- Greater Vancouver
- Greater Victoria
- Green Party of British Columbia
- Green River (British Columbia)
- Greenpeace
- Bert Gretzinger
- Gribbell Island
- Judith Guichon
- Guildford, British Columbia
- Guildford Town Centre
- Ryan Guldemond
- Gulf Islands
- Gulf Islands National Park Reserve
- Gwendoline (sternwheeler)

== H ==
- Hanceville, British Columbia
- John Hannen
- Rick Hansen
- Hanukkah Eve Wind Storm of 2006
- Mike Harcourt
- John Hart (Canadian politician)
- Hastings Mill
- Lisa Helps
- Highlands, British Columbia
- History of British Columbia
- Hollywood North
- Homathko River
- Hope, British Columbia
- John Horgan
- House dish
- Bruce Hutchison

== I ==
- Indigenous peoples of the Pacific Northwest Coast
- In-SHUCK-ch Nation
- Insular Mountains
- Insurance Corporation of British Columbia
- Interior Plateau

== J ==
- Dean Joanisse
- Boss Johnson
- Rita Johnston
- Jon and Roy

== K ==
- Kakwa Provincial Park and Protected Area
- Kal Tire Place
- Kamloops
- Kamloops Airport
- Kamloops Crown of Curling
- Kamloops Indian Residential School
- Kamloops Lake
- Karmutsen Formation
- Kechika River
- Kelowna
- Kermode bear
- Kettle River (Columbia River tributary)
- cEvin Key
- King George Boulevard
- King George station
- Linda Kirton
- Klattasine
- Patti Knezevic
- Kootenay Land District
- Kootenay River
- Leonard Krog
- Kwadacha Wilderness Provincial Park
- Kwantlen Polytechnic University

== L ==
- Ladner, British Columbia
- Ladner Ferry
- Ladysmith, British Columbia
- Langford, British Columbia
- Langley, British Columbia (city)
- Langley, British Columbia (district municipality)
- Kelley Law
- Legislative Assembly of British Columbia
- Liard Plain
- Lieutenant-Governor of British Columbia
- Gordon Light
- Lighthouse Park
- Lillooet
- Lillooet Country
- Lillooet Icecap
- Lillooet Land District
- Lillooet River
- Lillooet Tribal Council
- Lil'wat First Nation
- Lions Gate Bridge
- List of lieutenant governors of British Columbia
- List of British Columbia premiers
- List of British Columbia provincial highways
- List of British Columbia Regional Districts
- List of British Columbia Universities
- List of British Columbians
- List of communities in British Columbia
- List of mayors of Qualicum Beach, British Columbia
- List of physiogeographic regions of British Columbia
- List of power stations in British Columbia
- List of television stations in British Columbia
- List of waterfalls of British Columbia
- Lord River (Canada)
- Lower Mainland
- Lower Stl'atl'imx Tribal Council
- Daniel Loxton
- Lulu Island
- Lussier Hot Springs
- Lussier River
- Lyackson First Nation
- Lytton, British Columbia

== M ==
- Allison MacInnes
- Mackenzie, British Columbia
- John Duncan MacLean
- Madeira Park
- Marla Mallett
- Marble Canyon (British Columbia)
- Marble Range
- Joseph Martin (Canadian politician)
- Mathieson Channel
- Greg McAulay
- Richard McBride
- John Foster McCreight
- Allan McLean (outlaw)
- Donald McLean (fur trader)
- Lynne McNaughton
- Medical Services Plan
- Mess Creek Escarpment
- Mess Lake
- Metchosin
- Metro Vancouver Regional District
- Metropolis at Metrotown
- Mica Creek
- Bryan Miki
- Dan Miller (Canadian politician)
- Moev
- Monarchy in British Columbia
- Monashee Mountains
- Monmouth Mountain
- Richard Clement Moody
- Greg Moore (racing driver)
- Mother Mother
- Mount Currie, British Columbia
- Mount Edziza volcanic complex
- George Matheson Murray
- Margaret Lally "Ma" Murray
- Anthony Musgrave
- Musqueam Indian Band

== N ==
- Nanaimo
- Nanaimo City Council
- Nanaimo Harbour ferry terminal
- Nanaimo (provincial electoral district)
- Naramata
- Naut'sa mawt Tribal Council
- Nemaiah Valley, British Columbia
- Nettwerk
- New Caledonia (Canada)
- New Democratic Party of British Columbia
- New Westminster
- Newton, Surrey
- Nicknames of Vancouver
- Nicoamen River
- Nicola (Okanagan leader)
- North Saanich, British Columbia
- North Shore Mountains
- North Star (sternwheeler 1897)
- North Thompson River
- North Vancouver (district municipality)
- November 2021 Pacific Northwest floods
- N'Quatqua
- N'Quatqua First Nation
- Nuxalk Nation

== O ==
- Oak Bay, British Columbia
- Oak Bay (electoral district)
- Ogden Point
- Dave Ogilvie
- Ogopogo
- Nivek Ogre
- Okanagan
- Okanagan Country
- Okanagan Lake
- Okanagan Lake Bridge
- John Oliver (British Columbia politician)
- Adam Olsen
- Order of British Columbia
- Oregon boundary dispute
- Oregon Country
- Oregon Treaty
- Osoyoos

== P ==
- Pacific Scandal
- Park Royal Shopping Centre
- Parliament of British Columbia
- Duff Pattullo
- Pattullo Bridge
- Pavilion, British Columbia
- Pavilion Lake
- Pavilion Mountain
- Peace Arch
- Peace River Block
- Peachland
- Peak 2 Peak Gondola
- Pemberton, British Columbia
- Pender Harbour, British Columbia
- Penticton
- Penticton Herald
- Dailene Pewarchuk
- Brent Pierce
- Pig War (1859)
- Steven Point
- Point Grey
- Charles Edward Pooley
- Pooley Island
- Port Alberni
- Port of Vancouver
- Port of Vancouver (1964–2008)
- Potlatch
- Prince George, British Columbia
- Princess Royal Island
- Edward Gawler Prior
- John Privett
- Prospect Point (British Columbia)
- Provincial Health Services Authority
- Pugets Sound Agricultural Company

== Q ==
- qathet Regional District
- Quadra Island
- Quesnel, British Columbia
- Quesnel Highland
- Quesnel Lake
- Quesnel River

== R ==
- Rattlesnake Island (Okanagan Lake)
- Reform Party of British Columbia
- Regional district
- Regional District of East Kootenay
- Regional District of Nanaimo
- Ryan Reynolds
- Richmond, British Columbia
- Roberts Bank
- Roberts Bank Superport
- John Robson (politician)
- Rocky Mountain Trench
- Rocky Mountains
- Roderick Island
- Royal British Columbia Museum
- Royal City Curling Club
- Royal Roads
- Royal Roads University

== S ==
- Saanich and the Islands
- Saanich, British Columbia
- Saanich (electoral district)
- Saanich Inlet
- Saanich—Gulf Islands
- Saanich language
- Saanich North and the Islands
- Saanich Peninsula
- Saanich people
- Saanich South
- Saanichton
- Salish Sea
- Salt Spring Island
- Samahquam First Nation
- Same-sex marriage in British Columbia
- Pat Sanders
- Randeep Sarai
- Sasquatch
- Saturna Island
- Save-On-Foods
- Save-On-Foods Memorial Centre
- Kelly Scott
- Scott Road station
- Semiahmoo First Nation
- Charles Augustus Semlin
- Seton Lake First Nation
- Seton Portage
- Frederick Seymour
- Shalalth
- Sidney, British Columbia
- Simon Fraser University
- Skatin First Nations
- Melissa M. Skelton
- Julie Skinner
- Skinny Puppy
- Skookumchuck, British Columbia
- SkyTrain (Vancouver)
- William Smithe
- Snuneymuxw First Nation
- Socialist Party of British Columbia
- South Surrey
- South Westminster
- Bernie Sparkes
- Squamish Nation
- Squamish people
- Stanley Park
- Starlight Stadium
- Stʼatʼimc
- Stone First Nation
- Strait of Georgia
- Strait of Juan de Fuca
- Kennedy Stewart (Canadian politician)
- Dorothy Stowe
- Irving Stowe
- Strathcona Provincial Park
- Strathcona Regional District
- Stikine Region
- Stz'uminus First Nation
- Sumas Prairie
- Summerland, British Columbia
- Surrey, British Columbia
- Surrey Central station
- Surrey Libraries
- Surrey North
- Surrey-Whalley
- Susan Island

== T ==
- Tacheeda, British Columbia
- Taseko Lakes
- Taseko River
- Tchaikazan River
- TED (conference)
- Telegraph Creek
- Territory of the People
- The Daily Courier (Kelowna)
- The Empress (hotel)
- The Grapes of Wrath (band)
- Thetis Lake
- Thetis Lake Monster
- Thompson River
- Thuja plicata
- Thunderbird Park (Victoria, British Columbia)
- Times Colonist
- Tl'etinqox-t'in Government Office
- Tlingit
- Tlingit language
- Simon Fraser Tolmie
- Toosey First Nation
- Top of the World Provincial Park
- TransLink (British Columbia)
- Tsawwassen
- Tŝideldel First Nation
- Tsilhqotʼin
- Tsilhqot'in Nation v British Columbia
- Tsilhqot'in National Government
- Ts'il?os Provincial Park
- Tsleil-Waututh First Nation
- John Herbert Turner

== U ==
- Ulkatcho First Nation
- University of British Columbia
- University of Victoria
- Bob Ursel

== V ==
- Valdes Island
- Vancouver
- Vancouver 2010 (video game)
- Vancouver Island
- Vancouver Sun
- Vancouver Whitecaps FC
- Vancouverism
- Bill Vander Zalm
- Vanderhoof, British Columbia
- Vernon, British Columbia
- Victoria, British Columbia
- Victoria Butterfly Gardens
- Victoria Cool Aid Society
- Victoria Salmon Kings
- View Royal

== W ==
- Alfred Waddington
- George Anthony Walkem
- Chris Walter (author)
- Wanetta Lake
- Sarah Wark
- West End, Vancouver
- West Kelowna
- West Shore, British Columbia
- West Vancouver
- Western Canada
- Westham Island
- Whalley, Surrey
- Georgina Wheatcroft
- Whistler Blackcomb
- Whistler, British Columbia
- Whistler Mountain
- Whiteswan Lake Provincial Park
- William R. Bennett Bridge
- Williams Creek (British Columbia)
- Williams Lake, British Columbia
- Willis Point, British Columbia
- Willow River (British Columbia)
- Willow River, British Columbia
- Mike Wood (curler)

== X ==
- Xeni Gwet'in
- Xeni Gwet'in First Nation

== Y ==
- Yale, British Columbia
- Yunesit'in

== See also ==
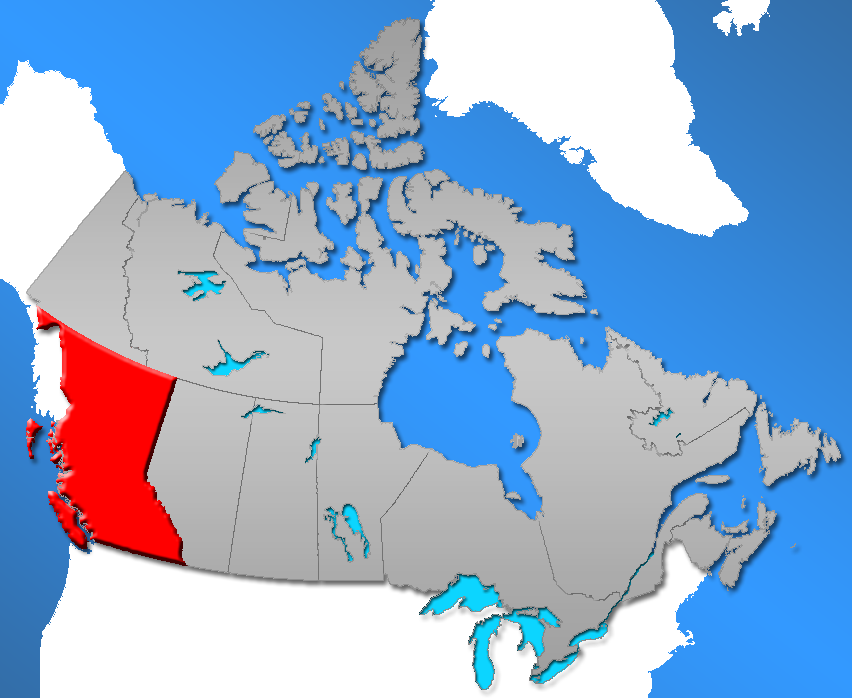
Lists of topics by provinces and territories
