= Outline of British Columbia =

Province of Canada

Flag of British Columbia

Coat of arms of British Columbia

Location of British Columbia

The following outline is provided as an overview of and topical guide to British Columbia:

British Columbia is the westernmost of Canada's provinces. It lies between the Pacific Ocean to the west and the province of Alberta to the east. British Columbia was the sixth province to join the Canadian Confederation.

== General reference ==
- Pronunciation: /ˌbrɪtɪʃ kəˈlʌmbiə/
- Common English name(s): British Columbia or "BC"
- Official English name: British Columbia
  - Abbreviations and name codes
    - Postal symbol: "V"
    - ISO 3166-2 code: CA-BC
    - Internet second-level domain: .bc.ca
- Common endonym(s): "The Pacific Province", "the Dogwood Province", "Beautiful British Columbia", "Beautiful BC"
- Official endonym(s):
- Adjectival(s): British Columbia
- Demonym(s): British Columbian

== Geography of British Columbia ==
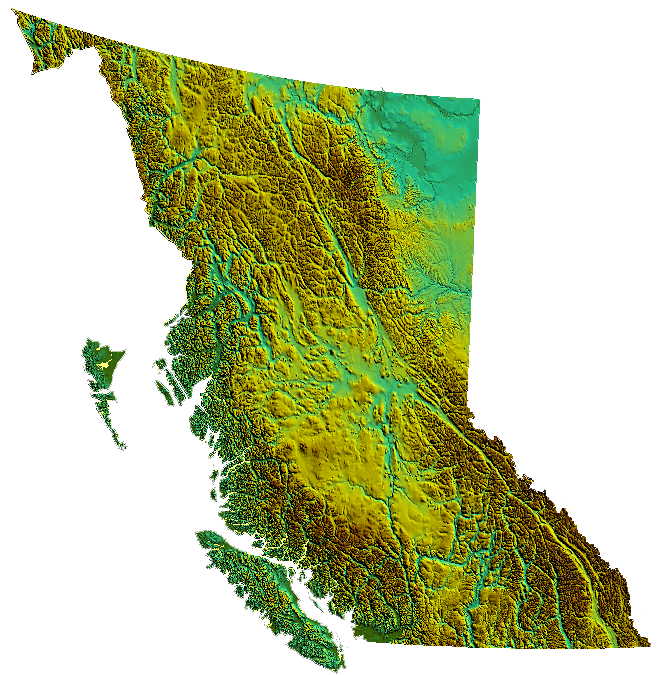
Topographical map of British Columbia

Geography of British Columbia

- British Columbia is: a province of Canada
- Location:
  - The regions in which British Columbia is located are:
    - Northern Hemisphere, Western Hemisphere
      - Americas
        - North America
          - Northern America
            - Canada
              - Western Canada
  - Extreme points of British Columbia
- Population of British Columbia: : 4,254,500 (2005)
- Area of British Columbia: 944,735 km^{2} (364,764.2 sq mi)
- Atlas of British Columbia

=== Environment of British Columbia ===
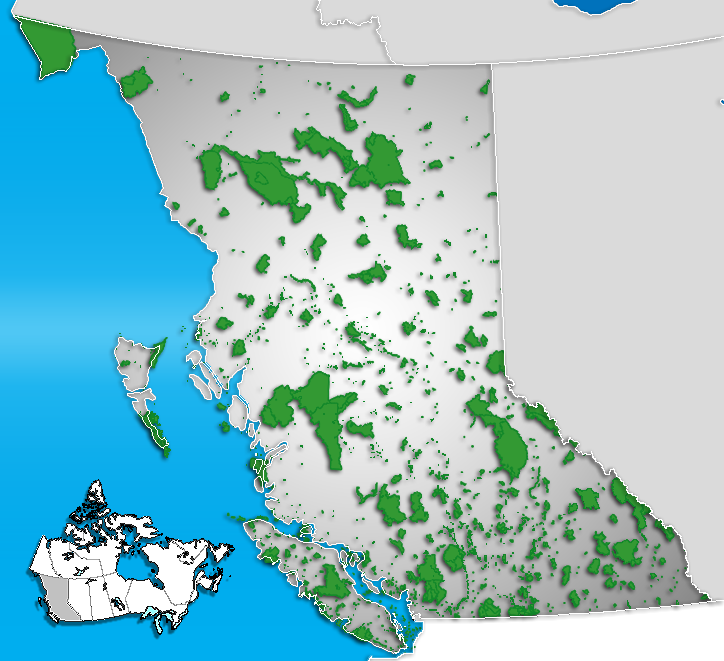
Parks in British Columbia

- Air pollution in British Columbia
- Climate of British Columbia
- Conservation status of British Columbia salmonids
- Ecology of British Columbia
- Geology of British Columbia
- Protected areas of British Columbia
  - Provincial Parks of British Columbia
- Wildlife of British Columbia
  - Mammals of British Columbia

==== Natural geographic features of British Columbia ====
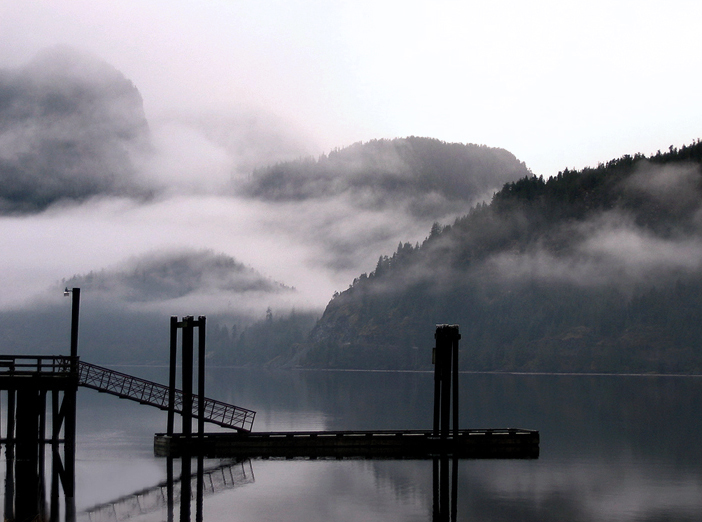
A view of Zeballos Harbour from the village of Zeballos, on the Pacific Coast of Vancouver Island

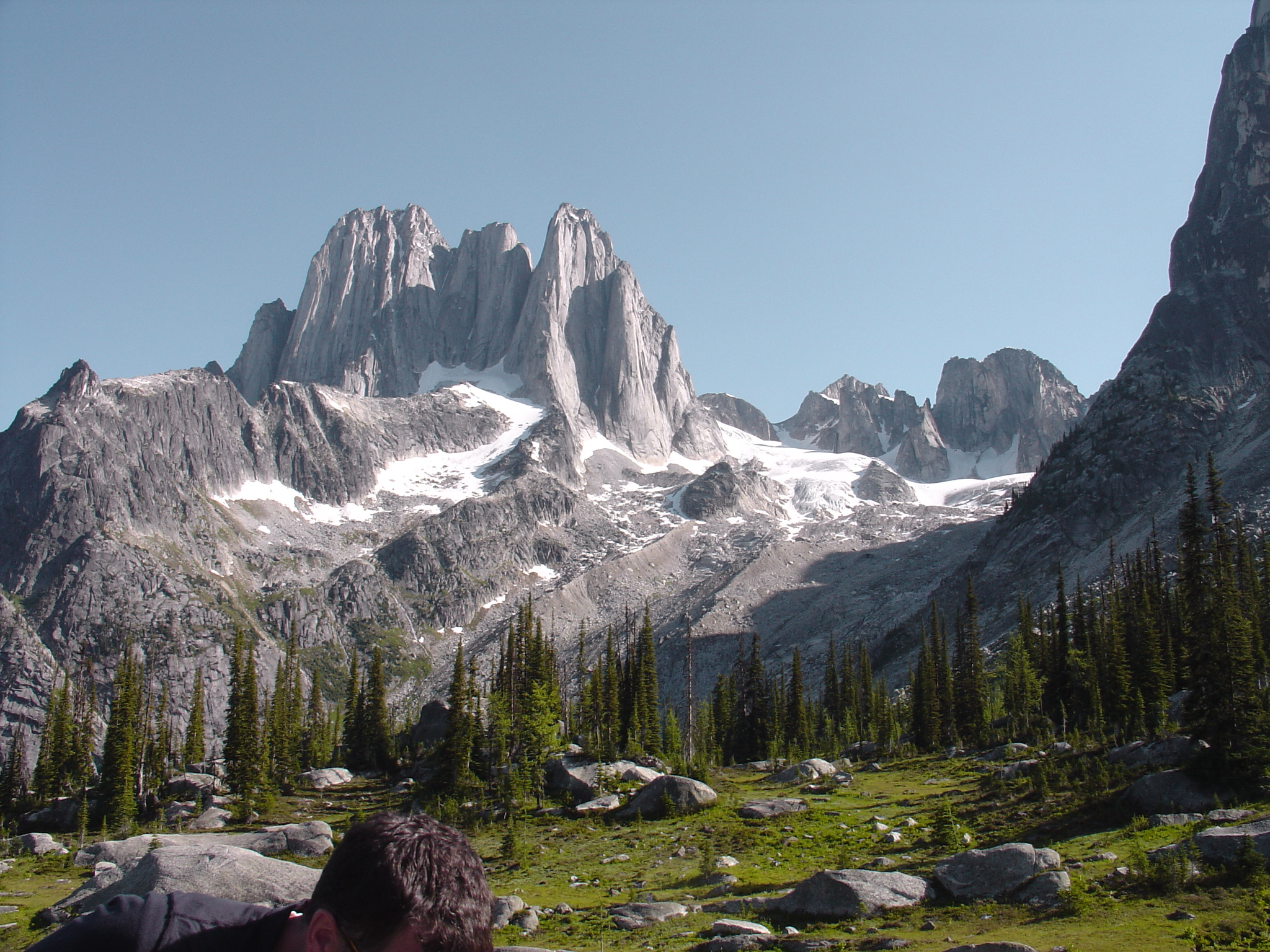
Howser Spire, highest mountain of The Bugaboos, a subrange of the Purcell Mountains, which is a subrange of the Columbia Mountains

- Coast of British Columbia
- Fjords of British Columbia
- Glaciers of British Columbia
- Islands of British Columbia
- Lakes of British Columbia
- Mountains of British Columbia
  - Volcanoes of British Columbia
  - Mountain ranges of British Columbia
    - Plateaus of British Columbia
  - Mountain passes of British Columbia
  - Peaks on the Alberta–British Columbia border
  - Boundary Peaks of the Alaska – British Columbia/Yukon border
- Rivers of British Columbia
  - Waterfalls of British Columbia
  - Canyons and gorges of British Columbia
- Valleys of British Columbia (see also Regions)
- Hot springs of British Columbia

=== Regions of British Columbia ===
- British Columbia Interior
- Lower Mainland
  - Fraser Valley
  - Greater Vancouver
- British Columbia Coast
  - Vancouver Island

==== Biogeoclimatic zones, ecozones and ecoregions of British Columbia ====
Biogeoclimatic zones of British Columbia

==== Administrative divisions of British Columbia ====
Administrative divisions of British Columbia

- Forest regions and districts of British Columbia
- Ministry of Environment Regions of British Columbia
  - BC Parks regions
- Ministry of Tourism regions
- Mining districts of British Columbia
- Health regions of British Columbia
- List of land districts of British Columbia (cadastral survey system)
- Counties of British Columbia (court system)
- School districts in British Columbia
- Assessment areas of British Columbia (property tax)
- Development Regions of British Columbia
- College Regions of British Columbia
- Land and Resource Management Planning Areas of British Columbia
- Ministry of Social Development and Social Innovation Regions
- Ministry of Transportation Regions
  - Department of Highways Districts

===== Communities of British Columbia =====
- Communities in British Columbia
  - Municipalities of British Columbia
    - Regional districts of British Columbia
      - Regional district electoral areas in British Columbia
    - Cities of British Columbia
      - Urban centres
        - Vancouver
        - Victoria
        - Kelowna
        - Abbotsford
        - Kamloops
        - Nanaimo
        - Prince George
  - Indian reserves in British Columbia

=== Demographics of British Columbia ===
Demographics of British Columbia

== Government and politics of British Columbia ==
Politics of British Columbia

- Form of government: Constitutional monarchy
- Capital of British Columbia: Victoria
- Elections in British Columbia
- Political issues
  - Cannabis in British Columbia
  - Hunting Status On Grizzly Bears in British Columbia, Canada
- Political parties in British Columbia
- Political scandals of British Columbia
- Taxation in Canada

=== Federal representation ===
- Senators

=== Provincial government of British Columbia ===
==== Executive branch ====
- Head of state: King of Canada, Charles III
  - Head of state's representative (Viceroy): Lieutenant Governor of British Columbia, Wendy Lisogar-Cocchia
    - List of lieutenant governors of British Columbia
    - Head of government: Premier of British Columbia, David Eby
      - Deputy Premier of British Columbia
      - Cabinet: Executive Council of British Columbia
        - Head of council: Lieutenant Governor in Council, as representative of the King in Right of British Columbia
      - British Columbia Government Agencies and Crown Corporations

==== Legislative branch ====
- Parliament of British Columbia, which has 2 components:
  - King-in-Parliament (King of Canada), represented in his absence by the Lieutenant-Governor of British Columbia
  - Legislative Assembly of British Columbia
    - Speaker of the Legislative Assembly of British Columbia

==== Judicial branch ====
Court system of British Columbia

- Court of Appeal of British Columbia
  - Supreme Court of British Columbia
    - Provincial Court of British Columbia
      - County Court of British Columbia
        - Counties of British Columbia

=== Legal framework in British Columbia ===
- Cannabis in British Columbia
- Constitution of British Columbia
- Criminal justice system of British Columbia
  - Criminal Code
  - Capital punishment in British Columbia: none.
  - Canada eliminated the death penalty for murder nationwide on July 14, 1976.
- Same-sex marriage in British Columbia

==== Law enforcement in British Columbia ====
List of law enforcement agencies in British Columbia

- British Columbia Provincial Police (defunct)
- Royal Canadian Mounted Police "E" Division
- E-Comm
- British Columbia Sheriff Services

=== Military in British Columbia ===
- Military units in British Columbia (historical)
  - Free Company of Volunteers of Catalonia (Spanish Empire - withdrawn)
  - Victoria Voltigeurs (disbanded)
  - Victoria Pioneer Rifle Corps (aka "African Rifles")
  - Pacific Station (Royal Navy - withdrawn)
  - Royal Engineers, Columbia Detachment (withdrawn)
    - see also Ancient and Honourable Hyack Anvil Battery (now New Westminster Fire Dept, originally RE)
  - Royal Marines (withdrawn)
- Canadian Forces bases in British Columbia
  - CFB Esquimalt
  - CFB Chilliwack
  - NRS Aldergrove
  - CFB Comox
  - Canadian Forces Camp Chilcotin
  - CFMETR, Nanoose Bay
  - Seaforth Armoury, Vancouver
  - Beatty Street Drill Hall, Vancouver
  - Bay Street Drill Hall, Victoria
  - Brigadier Angle Armoury, Kelowna, British Columbia Federal Recognized Federal Heritage building 1997 on the Register of the Government of Canada Heritage Buildings.
  - Royal Roads Military College (Hatley Park/Royal Roads University)
  - British Columbia Armoury, New Westminster
  - Deadman's Island (HMCS Discovery Naval Reserve Division), Vancouver
- Defunct military bases in British Columbia
  - Fort Rodd Hill (Royal Navy/Marines, defunct/museum)
  - CFB Holberg
  - CFB Masset
  - CFB Matsqui
  - CFB Jericho
  - Fort Steele (Royal Northwest Mounted Police)
- Military units in British Columbia
  - The British Columbia Dragoons
  - The British Columbia Regiment (Duke of Connaught's Own)
  - Seaforth Highlanders of Canada
  - Royal Westminster Regiment
- Militia units in British Columbia
  - Rocky Mountain Rangers
- Cadet units in British Columbia
  - 2290 British Columbia Regiment (Duke of Connaught's Own) Cadet Corps

== History of British Columbia ==
History of British Columbia

=== History of British Columbia, by period ===
- Colony of British Columbia (1858–1866)
- Colony of British Columbia (1866–1871)

=== History of British Columbia, by region ===
- History of Vancouver
- History of Victoria
- History of Kelowna
- History of Abbotsford
- History of Kamloops
- History of Nanaimo
- History of Prince George

=== History of British Columbia, by subject ===
- Ghost towns in British Columbia
- British Columbia Gold Rushes
- Historical ships in British Columbia

== Culture of British Columbia ==
- Architecture of British Columbia
  - Parliament Buildings of British Columbia
  - Heritage buildings in Vancouver
- Cannabis in British Columbia
- Cuisine of British Columbia
  - Canadian Chinese cuisine
  - British Columbia wine
- Languages of British Columbia
  - Chinook Jargon
- Museums of British Columbia
  - Royal British Columbia Museum
- Order of British Columbia
- Provincial symbols of British Columbia
  - Coat of arms of British Columbia
  - Flag of British Columbia
- Recreation in British Columbia
- Religion in British Columbia

=== Heritage sites in British Columbia ===
- Historic places in British Columbia
- World Heritage Sites in British Columbia
  - Canadian Rocky Mountain Parks in Alberta and British Columbia
  - Kluane-Wrangell-St. Elias-Glacier Bay-Tatshenshini-Alsek (partially in Yukon and British Columbia, Canada, and Alaska, United States)
  - Gwaii Haanas National Park Reserve and Haida Heritage Site - British Columbia
    - Moresby Island
    - Ninstints (Skungwai, SGang Gwaay)
- National Historic Sites of Canada in British Columbia
- Heritage buildings in Vancouver

=== The Arts in British Columbia ===
- Music of British Columbia
- Ballet British Columbia
- List of writers from British Columbia

=== Sports in British Columbia ===
- British Columbia Derby
- British Columbia Hockey League
- British Columbia Lacrosse Association
- Mountain biking in British Columbia
- British Columbia Rugby Union
- British Columbia Soccer Association

== Economy and infrastructure of British Columbia ==
- Economic rank (by nominal GDP):
- Banking in British Columbia
  - Banks and credit unions in Canada
- Communications in British Columbia
  - Radio stations in British Columbia
  - Television stations in British Columbia
- Currency of British Columbia:
  - Mines in British Columbia
- Sales taxes in British Columbia
- Transportation in British Columbia
  - Airports in British Columbia
  - Roads in British Columbia
    - Provincial highways of British Columbia

== Education in British Columbia ==
- Higher education in British Columbia
  - Colleges in British Columbia
  - University of British Columbia
    - University of British Columbia Library

== See also ==
- Index of British Columbia–related articles
- List of international rankings
- Outline of geography
  - Outline of Canada
    - Outline of Alberta
    - Outline of Manitoba
    - Outline of Nova Scotia
    - Outline of Ontario
    - Outline of Prince Edward Island
    - Outline of Quebec
    - Outline of Saskatchewan
