= IMEA =

IMEA may refer to:

- Illinois Music Educators Association, a state-level organization promoting music education
- India, Middle East and Africa, a group of countries
- Indian Ministry of External Affairs, the foreign affairs agency of the government of India
- Eandis IMEA, a Belgian electrical power distribution company
- Interim Measures Extension Agreement, of the Clayoquot Sound Central Region Board
- Innovation in Music and Entertainment Awards, presented as part of the Popkomm trade show
- International Music and Entertainment Association, an American volunteer website with Awards
