= BC Council for Families =

Canadian nonprofit organization

- Founded: 1977
- Type: Non-profit organization
- Location: 208-1600 West 6th Ave, Vancouver B.C. V6J 1R3
- Region served: British Columbia, Canada
- Website: bccf.ca
- Formerly called: BC Council for the Family

The BC Council for Families is a Canadian nonprofit organization covering the province of British Columbia (BC).

Originally named the BC Council for the Family, the BC Council for Families is a British Columbian non-profit society founded in 1977. Emerging from the 1975–1976 BC Conference on the Family, it is the result of religious, community, and provincial government concerns over family issues.

The council's offices are currently located in Vancouver, British Columbia.

They work to provide access to information, skills training, parent education, evidence-based research, and effective advocacy. The council maintains an active and positive role in local, provincial and national family initiatives.

== Training programs ==
=== Nobody's Perfect Parenting Program ===
Since 1989, the BC Council for Families has provided assistance to group facilitators, distributed multi-language course materials, and administered on-going program coordination for Nobody's Perfect throughout British Columbia. The program today is provided in most communities province-wide.

Nobody's Perfect is a free national program first introduced in 1987 and to BC in 1989. It currently focuses on providing preventative education for at-risk parents of young children. By emphasizing community-based support networks, it aims to enhance parenting techniques and inspire confidence. Alongside two trained facilitators, these goals are achieved through the ongoing, voluntary participation of parents in guided group sessions.

=== The Parent–Child Mother Goose Program ===
Since July 2002, the BC Council for Families has provided on-going program coordination for the British Columbian Parent-Child Mother Goose Program. Consultation for program teachers, newsletters, training organization, and connections both nationally and internationally all help to provide programs in many BC communities that have meaningful impact.

Originally developed in Ontario, The Parent-Child Mother Goose Program was created in 1986. The program is provided nationwide and is a group experience for parents, their babies, and their young children (0–5 in smaller age groupings). Group sessions focus on the use of oral rhymes, songs, and stories. These playful activities contribute to parent-child relationships, parental confidence, parental ability, child development, and both parent-parent and community connections. The Parent-Child Mother Goose Program is provided on a free, voluntary, and community oriented basis.

=== My Tween and Me Parenting Program ===
Developed in 2005 and launched by the BC Council for Families in 2006, the Council coordinates facilitator training for experienced parent educators in the program's promotion, marketing, and implementation. The My Tween and Me Parenting Program is provided in communities throughout British Columbia to prevent potential risks which may arise as a tween becomes a teenager.

The program is designed to improve the relationship between parents and their tween child (ages 7–12). Through emphasizing strong relationships early on, program leaders educate parents on how to remain a key source of information and influence for their growing tween. My Tween and Me is a research based prevention program influenced by ecological systems theory. Working alongside a trained facilitator, groups of parents develop effective strategies by meeting and working through six sessions. Sessions include: Healthy Development, Life at School, Family Relationships, Peer Relationships, Today's World and Building Community.

=== Home Visitor Training Initiative ===
Since 2007, the BC Council for Families' Home Visitor Training Initiative has trained para-professionals across British Columbia in effective home visiting skills, procedures and strategies. The council also provides online resources, networking opportunities and support for home visitor initiative programs across the province. Home Visiting programs exist in many Canadian provinces. The goals of this service are to bring parents information and support to help improve their skill level, confidence, and to create accessible networks of ongoing parental support, reduce potential risk to children, and engage parents who lack immediate access to supportive assistance.

== Program networks ==
=== Father Involvement Network of BC (FIN-BC) ===
The Father Involvement Network of British Columbia (FIN-BC) supports fathering researchers, practitioners, and policy makers in their attempts to create innovative fathering supports grounded in evidence. The BC Council for Families assists FIN-BC in providing training opportunities, resources, and participation in research projects.

=== BC Alliance for Young Parents ===
The BC Alliance for Young Parents works to support and empower young parents across the province of British Columbia. It is a network of family oriented professionals and organizations working towards creative, meaningful solutions to many of the challenges young parents currently face. Each year, an annual BC Alliance for Young Parents Conference is held to allow individuals to work together on solving these problems.
