= Hanceville =

Hanceville may refer to:

- Hanceville, Alabama
- Hanceville, British Columbia
