= Forest Renewal BC =

Forest Renewal BC was a Crown corporation that delivered a variety of programs aimed at supporting the forests and forest industry of British Columbia.

== History ==
From 2002 Victoria - B.C. Forests Minister Mike de Jong says Forest Renewal B.C. will be replaced by a forest investment account, with most of the work done by private contractors.

Forest Renewal BC was initiated as a rural development program for "forest dependent" regions and communities in British Columbia by the New Democratic government of the day. Forest industry pundits were critical of FRBC, at least in part because of the "super-stumpage" costs associated with it (stumpage is a tax on harvested timber paid by forest licensees to the Crown). With the election of the BC Liberals, FRBC was cut. Ambitious in scope, FRBC left a legacy with many communities in hinterland BC, though this legacy is hard to find.
