= Demographics of British Columbia =

British Columbia is a Canadian province with a population of over 5.7 million people. The province represents about 13.2% of the Canadian population. Most of the population is between the ages of 15 and 49. About 60 percent of British Columbians have European descent with significant Asian and Aboriginal minorities. Just under 30% of British Columbians are immigrants. Over half of the population is irreligious, with Christianity and Sikhism being the most followed religions.

Life expectancy in the province in 2019 was 82.7 years (80.6 for male, 85.0 for female)

== Vital statistics ==
British Columbia vital statistics since 1971
	Total population	Live births	Deaths	Natural change	Crude birth rate (per 1000)	Crude death rate (per 1000)	Natural change (per 1000)	Total fertility rate
1971	2,240,500	34,500	17,800	16,700	15.40	7.94	7.45	
1972	2,302,100	34,600	17,900	16,700	15.03	7.78	7.25	1.966
1973	2,367,300	34,500	18,800	15,600	14.57	7.94	6.59	1.875
1974	2,442,600	36,200	19,400	16,800	14.82	7.94	6.88	1.769
1975	2,499,600	36,100	19,100	17,000	14.44	7.64	6.80	1.756
1976	2,533,900	36,200	18,200	18,000	14.29	7.18	7.10	1.690
1977	2,570,300	36,700	18,900	17,800	14.28	7.35	6.93	1.649
1978	2,615,200	38,000	19,100	18,900	14.53	7.30	7.23	1.630
1979	2,665,200	38,900	19,200	19,700	14.60	7.21	7.39	1.637
1980	2,745,900	40,900	19,700	21,200	14.89	7.17	7.72	1.615
1981	2,826,600	42,700	20,200	22,500	15.10	7.14	7.96	1.619
1982	2,876,500	42,400	20,300	22,100	14.74	7.06	7.68	1.664
1983	2,907,500	43,700	20,400	23,300	15.03	7.02	8.02	1.631
1984	2,947,200	43,500	20,800	22,700	14.76	7.06	7.71	1.661
1985	2,975,100	42,400	21,400	21,000	14.25	7.19	7.06	1.675
1986	3,003,600	42,200	21,300	20,900	14.05	7.09	6.96	1.623
1987	3,048,700	41,900	22,700	19,200	13.75	7.44	6.30	1.609
1988	3,114,800	43,600	22,600	21,000	13.99	7.26	6.74	1.659
1989	3,196,700	45,200	23,300	21,900	14.13	7.29	6.85	1.696
1990	3,292,100	45,100	23,700	21,300	13.70	7.20	6.48	1.663
1991	3,373,800	46,100	24,300	21,800	13.66	7.21	6.46	1.696
1992	3,468,800	46,000	25,600	20,300	13.26	7.38	5.86	1.663
1993	3,567,800	46,400	25,500	20,900	13.01	7.15	5.86	1.651
1994	3,676,100	47,000	26,300	20,700	12.78	7.15	5.63	1.645
1995	3,777,400	46,900	27,000	19,900	12.42	7.15	5.27	1.619
1996	3,874,300	45,300	27,600	17,700	11.69	7.12	4.57	1.529
1997	3,948,600	43,600	27,900	15,700	11.04	7.07	3.98	1.461
1998	3,983,100	42,600	27,800	14,800	10.70	6.98	3.72	1.441
1999	4,011,400	41,600	27,700	13,900	10.37	6.90	3.47	1.418
2000	4,039,200	40,400	27,900	12,500	10.00	6.91	3.09	1.388
2001	4,076,900	39,900	28,800	11,200	9.79	7.06	2.75	1.376
2002	4,100,500	40,500	28,700	11,800	9.87	7.00	2.88	1.412
2003	4,124,400	40,200	29,900	10,300	9.75	7.25	2.50	1.415
2004	4,155,600	40,700	30,400	10,300	9.80	7.31	2.48	1.436
2005	4,196,100	41,200	30,400	10,800	9.82	7.25	2.57	1.455
2006	4,241,800	42,400	31,000	11,400	10.00	7.31	2.69	1.490
2007	4,291,000	44,100	32,000	12,100	10.28	7.46	2.82	1.537
2008	4,349,300	44,700	31,400	13,300	10.28	7.22	3.06	1.531
2009	4,410,500	44,600	31,400	13,200	10.11	7.12	2.99	1.500
2010	4,465,600	43,900	31,700	12,200	9.83	7.10	2.73	1.451
2011	4,503,800	43,800	32,300	11,500	9.72	7.17	2.55	1.434
2012	4,570,900	44,200	32,900	11,300	9.67	7.20	2.47	1.428
2013	4,634,900	43,900	33,200	10,700	9.48	7.17	2.31	1.399
2014	4,712,700	44,500	34,800	9,600	9.44	7.38	2.04	1.393
2015	4,765,500	44,700	35,600	9,100	9.38	7.47	1.91	1.394
2016	4,861,300	45,000	38,400	6,600	9.26	7.90	1.36	1.369
2017	4,934,200	44,300	38,100	6,200	8.98	7.72	1.26	1.318
2018	5,021,000	43,400	38,600	4,900	8.64	7.69	0.95	1.256
2019	5,111,000	43,100	39,200	3,900	8.43	7.67	0.76	1.209
2020	5,176,100	42,900	42,800	100	8.29	8.27	0.02	1.175
2021	5,226,700	43,000	45,600	−2,700	8.22	8.72	−0.52	1.153
2022	5,356,300	41,000	45,100	−4,100	7.65	8.42	−0.77	1.058
2023	5,519,000	41,800	43,100	−1,300	7.57	7.81	−0.24	1.040
2024	5,682,100	43,000	43,200	−200	7.57	7.60	−0.04	1.052

British Columbia total fertility rate projections
	Total population	Total fertility rate
2026	5,812,800	1.076
2027	5,901,600	1.082
2028	5,997,300	1.086
2029	6,093,500	1.088
2030	6,189,400	1.088
2031	6,284,800	1.085
2032	6,379,700	1.082
2033	6,473,900	1.077
2034	6,567,600	1.071
2035	6,660,500	1.065
2036	6,752,800	1.057
2037	6,844,200	1.049
2038	6,934,700	1.041
2039	7,024,200	1.031
2040	7,112,500	1.022
2041	7,199,400	1.012
2042	7,284,800	1.002
2043	7,368,900	0.991
2044	7,451,500	0.981
2045	7,532,800	0.970
2046	7,612,800	0.959

== Age structure ==
	Males		Females	
Age group	Number	Percent	Number	Percent
0–4	111,015	2.22%	105,805	2.12%
5–9	125,810	2.52%	118,485	2.37%
10–14	132,425	2.65%	123,365	2.47%
15–19	131,245	2.62%	122,445	2.45%
20–24	151,505	3.03%	143,145	2.86%
25–29	170,500	3.41%	166,585	3.33%
30–34	178,925	3.58%	179,660	3.59%
35–39	175,175	3.5%	178,175	3.56%
40–44	156,480	3.13%	163,260	3.26%
45–49	149,520	2.99%	160,515	3.21%
50–54	158,540	3.17%	170,460	3.41%
55–59	172,520	3.45%	183,825	3.68%
60–64	170,210	3.40%	184,920	3.7%
65–69	152,705	3.05%	166,700	3.33%
70–74	130,370	2.61%	141,995	2.84%
75–79	86,060	1.72%	95,015	1.9%
80–84	55,285	1.11%	65,780	1.32%
85-89	32,315	0.65%	42,005	0.84%
90-94	13,715	0.27%	23,120	0.46%
95-99	2,865	0.06%	6,925	0.14%
100+	330	<0.01%	1,185	0.02%
Totals	2,457,515	49.14%	2,543,365	50.86%
Source: 2021 Canadian census

=== Percentage surviving ===
The percentage surviving is the percent of the population that would survive to certain age if their life conditions, in a given year, were extrapolated to their whole life. Data for 2019.

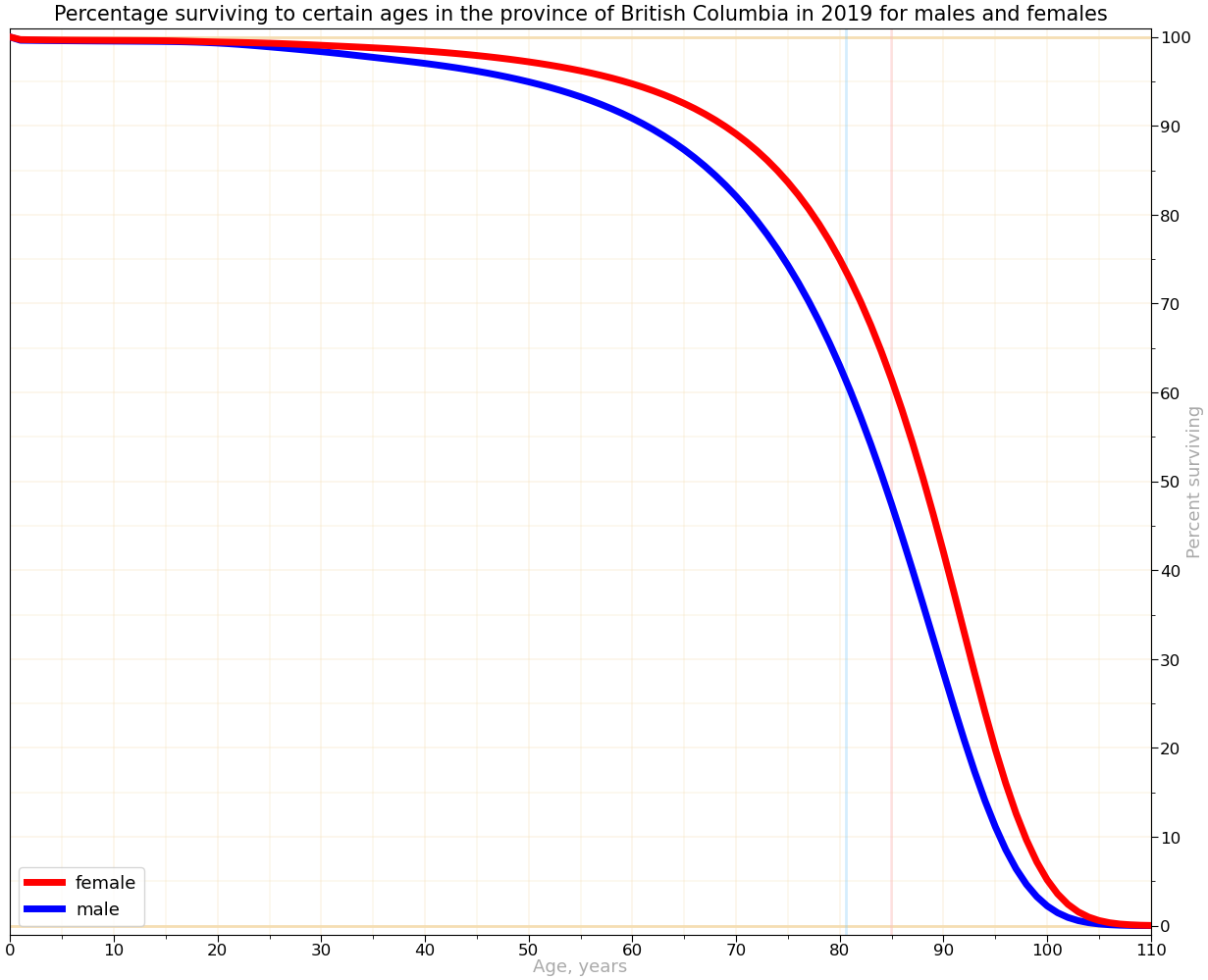
Percentage surviving to certain ages in British Columbia in 2019. Life expectancy in the province in that year was 82.74 years.

Percentage surviving to certain ages in British Columbia (2019)
Age	Percentage surviving		F Δ M	F / M
Age	Male	Female	F Δ M	F / M
1	99.6	99.7	0.1	1.00
5	99.6	99.7	0.1	1.00
10	99.5	99.6	0.1	1.00
15	99.5	99.6	0.1	1.00
20	99.3	99.4	0.1	1.00
25	98.9	99.3	0.4	1.00
30	98.4	99.1	0.7	1.01
35	97.7	98.8	1.1	1.01
40	97.0	98.4	1.4	1.01
45	96.2	97.9	1.8	1.02
50	95.0	97.2	2.3	1.02
55	93.3	96.2	2.9	1.03
60	90.8	94.7	3.9	1.04
65	87.3	92.5	5.2	1.06
70	82.1	89.1	7.0	1.09
75	74.3	83.7	9.4	1.13
80	63.0	75.0	12.0	1.19
85	47.4	61.5	14.1	1.30
90	28.5	42.0	13.5	1.48
95	11.1	19.8	8.7	1.78
100	2.216	5.155	2.939	2.33
105	0.188	0.577	0.389	3.07
110	0.006	0.025	0.019	4.17

== Population history ==
View chart definition.

Year	Population	Five year % change	Ten year % change	Rank among provinces
1851	55,000	n/a	n/a	n/a
1861	51,524	n/a	−6.3	n/a
1871	36,247	n/a	−29.7	7
1881	49,459	n/a	36.4	8
1891	98,173	n/a	98.5	8
1901	178,657	n/a	82.0	6
1911	392,480	n/a	119.7	6
1921	524,582	n/a	33.7	6
1931	694,263	n/a	32.3	6
1941	817,861	n/a	17.8	4
1951	1,165,210	n/a	42.5	3
1956	1,398,464	20.0	n/a	3
1961	1,629,082	16.5	39.8	3
1966	1,873,674	15.0	34.0	3
1971	2,184,620	16.6	34.1	3
1976	2,466,610	12.9	31.6	3
1981	2,744,467	11.3	25.6	3
1986	2,883,370	5.1	16.9	3
1991	3,282,061	13.8	19.6	3
1996	3,724,500	13.5	29.2	3
2001	3,907,738	4.9	19.1	3
2006	4,113,487	5.4	10.4	3
2011	4,400,057	7.0	12.6	3
2016	4,648,055	5.6	13.0	3
2021	5,000,879	7.6	13.7	3

Source: Statistics Canada

== Ethnic origins ==
First-generation immigrants from the British Isles remain a strong component of local society despite the end of special immigration status for British subjects in the 1960s. Also present in large numbers relative to other Canadian cities (except Toronto) is a diverse background of European ethnicities, with many first- and second-generation immigrants, notably Germans, Ukrainians, Scandinavians, Yugoslavs and Italians. Third-generation Europeans are generally of mixed lineage, traditionally intermarrying with other ethnic groups more than in any other Canadian province.

In recent decades, the proportion of people with Chinese and Indian ethnicity has risen sharply, specifically in the Lower Mainland. This has led to an extremely diverse population compared to many other provinces, especially the neighbouring prairie provinces.

Note: The following statistics represent both single (e.g., "German") and multiple (e.g., "part Chinese, part English") responses to the 2006 and 2016 census, and thus add up to more than 100%.

Ethnic groups in British Columbia (2006–2016)
Ethnic group	2016		2006	
Ethnic group	Pop.	%	Pop.	%
English	1,203,540	26.39%	1,207,245	29.63%
Canadian	866,530	19%	720,200	17.67%
Scottish	860,775	18.88%	828,145	20.32%
Irish	675,135	14.80%	618,120	15.17%
German	603,265	13.23%	561,570	13.78%
Chinese	540,155	11.84%	432,435	10.60%
French	388,815	8.53%	361,215	8.86%
Indian	309,315	6.78%	232,370	5.70%
Ukrainian	229,205	5.03%	197,265	4.84%
Indigenous peoples of North America	220,245	4.83%	193,060	4.74%
Dutch (Netherlands)	213,670	4.69%	196,420	4.82%
Italian	166,095	3.64%	143,155	3.51%
Polish	149,635	3.28%	128,360	3.15%
Norwegian	138,430	3.04%	129,420	3.18%
Russian	131,060	2.87%	114,105	2.80%
Welsh	113,905	2.5%	104,275	2.56%
Swedish	110,030	2.41%	104,025	2.55%
Filipino	158,215	3.47%	94,255	2.3%
Métis	90,515	1.98%	62,570	1.5%
American (USA)	78,170	1.71%	66,765	1.6%
Spanish	64,470	1.41%	52,640	1.3%
Korean	63,300	1.39%	51,860	1.3%
Danish	58,205	1.28%	56,125	1.4%
Hungarian (Magyar)	56,535	1.24%	49,870	1.2%
Japanese	51,150	1.12%	41,585	1.0%
Austrian	48,510	1.06%	46,620	1.1%
Iranian	47,985	1.05%	29,265	0.7%
Portuguese	41,770	0.92%	34,660	0.9%
Vietnamese	41,435	0.91%	30,835	0.8%
Punjabi	38,725	0.85%	18,525	0.5%
Finnish	34,150	0.75%	29,875	0.7%
Swiss	31,390	0.69%	28,240	0.7%
Romanian	31,250	0.69%	25,670	0.6%
Icelandic	26,410	0.58%	22,110	0.5%
Greek	24,460	0.54%	21,770	0.5%
Croatian	23,845	0.52%	18,815	0.5%
Czech	23,375	0.51%	21,150	0.5%
Belgian	19,980	0.44%	17,510	0.4%
Jewish	17,580	0.39%	30,830	0.8%

=== Projections ===
Pan-ethnic origin projections (2031–2041)
	2031		2036		2041	
	Population	%	Population	%	Population	%
European (Note: Statistic includes all persons that did not make up part of a visible minority or an aboriginal identity.)	3,145,000	51.46%	3,112,000	48.23%	3,060,000	45.37%
East Asian	977,000	15.99%	1,072,000	16.61%	1,160,000	17.2%
Chinese	789,000	12.91%	861,000	13.34%	927,000	13.75%
Korean	125,000	2.05%	143,000	2.22%	161,000	2.39%
Japanese	63,000	1.03%	68,000	1.05%	72,000	1.07%
South Asian	748,000	12.24%	860,000	13.33%	958,000	14.21%
Indigenous	399,000	6.53%	429,000	6.65%	456,000	6.76%
First Nations	246,000	4.03%	262,000	4.06%	278,000	4.12%
Metis	142,000	2.32%	155,000	2.4%	166,000	2.46%
Inuit	2,000	0.03%	2,000	0.03%	3,000	0.04%
Other Indigenous	9,000	0.15%	10,000	0.15%	10,000	0.15%
Southeast Asian	366,000	5.99%	421,000	6.52%	475,000	7.04%
Filipino	277,000	4.53%	323,000	5.01%	369,000	5.47%
Other Southeast Asian	89,000	1.46%	98,000	1.52%	106,000	1.57%
Middle Eastern	169,000	2.77%	199,000	3.08%	227,000	3.37%
Arab	55,000	0.9%	65,000	1.01%	74,000	1.1%
West Asian	114,000	1.87%	134,000	2.08%	153,000	2.27%
Latin American	108,000	1.77%	124,000	1.92%	139,000	2.06%
African	101,000	1.65%	118,000	1.83%	134,000	1.99%
Other	99,000	1.62%	117,000	1.81%	135,000	2%
Projected British Columbia population	6,111,000	100%	6,453,000	100%	6,744,000	100%

== Visible minorities and Indigenous peoples ==
Population of British Columbia by visible minority and indigenous identity (2021):
1. European Canadian (59.7%)
2. Visible minority (34.4%)
3. Indigenous (5.90%)

Visible minority & Indigenous population in British Columbia (1986–2021)
Group	Population	2021 census		2016 census		2011 census		2006 census		2001 census		1996 census		1991 census		1986 census	
Group	Population	Pop.	%	Pop.	%	Pop.	%	Pop.	%	Pop.	%	Pop.	%	Pop.	%	Pop.	%
Non-Indigenous / non-visible minority group	British Isles (Note: Including multiple responses.) (Note: 1996-present census populations for British Isles and French origins may be undercounts, due to the creation of the "Canadian" ethnic origin category. All citizens of Canada are classified as "Canadians" as defined by Canada's nationality laws. However, "Canadian" as an ethnic group has since 1996 been added to census questionnaires for possible ancestry. "Canadian" was included as an example on the English questionnaire and "Canadien" as an example on the French questionnaire. "The majority of respondents to this selection are from the eastern part of the country that was first settled. Respondents generally are visibly European (Anglophones and Francophones), however no-longer self identify with their ethnic ancestral origins. This response is attributed to a multitude or generational distance from ancestral lineage. Source 1: Jack Jedwab (April 2008). "Our 'Cense' of Self: the 2006 Census saw 1.6 million 'Canadian' Canadians Return to British and French origins" (PDF). Association for Canadian Studies. p. 2. Archived from the original (PDF) on 2 October 2011. "Virtually all persons who reported "Canadian" in 1996 had English or French as a mother tongue, were born in Canada and had both parents born inside Canada. This suggests that many of these respondents were people whose families have been in this country for several generations. In effect the "new Canadians" were persons that previously reported either British or French origins. Moreover in 1996 some 55% of people with both parents born in Canada reported Canadian (alone or in combination with other origins). By contrast, only 4% of people with both parents born outside Canada reported Canadian. Thus the Canadian response did not appeal widely to either immigrants or their children. Most important however was that nearly half of those persons reporting Canadian origin in 1996 were in Quebec this represented a majority of the mother tongue francophone population[...]In the 2001 Census, 11.7 million people, or 39% of the total population, reported Canadian as their ethnic origin, either alone or in combination with other origins. Some 4.9 million Quebecers out of 7.1 million individuals reported Canadian or "Canadien" thus accounting for nearly seven in ten persons (nearly eighty percent of francophones in Quebec)." Source 2: Don Kerr (2007). The Changing Face of Canada: Essential Readings in Population. Canadian Scholars' Press. pp. 313–317. ISBN 978-1-55130-322-2. Source 3: Jantzen (2006) Footnote 5: Note that Canadian and Canadien have been separated since the two terms mean different things. In English, it usually means someone whose family has been in Canada for multiple generations. In French it is referring to "Les Habitants", settlers of New France during the 17th and 18th centuries who earned their living primarily from agricultural labour. Source 4: Jantzen (2006): The reporting of French New World ancestries (Canadien, Québécois, and French-Canadian) is concentrated in the 4th+ generations; 79% of French-Canadian, 88% of Canadien and 90% of Québécois are in the 4th+generations category. Source 5: Jantzen (2005): According to Table 3, the 4th+ generations are highest because of a strong sense of belonging to their ethnic or cultural group among those respondents reporting the New World ancestries of Canadien and Québécois. Source 6: Jantzen (2006): For respondents of French and New World ancestries the pattern is different. Where generational data is available, it is possible to see that not all respondents reporting these ancestries report a high sense of belonging to their ethnic or cultural group. The high proportions are focused among those respondents that are in the 4th+ generations, and unlike with the British Isles example, the difference between the 2nd and 3rd generations to the 4th+ generation is more pronounced. Since these ancestries are concentrated in the 4th+ generations, their high proportions of sense of belonging to ethnic or cultural group push up the 4th+ generational results.)	1,848,810	37.61%	1,926,040	42.24%	1,905,685	44.07%	1,860,675	45.67%	1,737,150	44.9%	1,779,120	48.22%	1,906,900	58.72%	1,818,270	63.81%
Non-Indigenous / non-visible minority group	Western European	789,950	16.07%	839,860	18.42%	797,115	18.43%	783,100	19.22%	700,840	18.11%	692,295	18.76%	677,210	20.85%	567,900	19.93%
Non-Indigenous / non-visible minority group	Eastern European	517,020	10.52%	569,260	12.48%	515,665	11.92%	493,365	12.11%	422,570	10.92%	395,450	10.72%	359,355	11.07%	283,795	9.96%
Non-Indigenous / non-visible minority group	French	367,465	7.47%	394,585	8.65%	374,515	8.66%	364,105	8.94%	333,330	8.62%	340,200	9.22%	340,430	10.48%	300,350	10.54%
Non-Indigenous / non-visible minority group	Southern European	358,820	7.3%	334,740	7.34%	303,170	7.01%	291,330	7.15%	245,130	6.34%	225,680	6.12%	196,495	6.05%	161,890	5.68%
Non-Indigenous / non-visible minority group	Northern European	355,985	7.24%	346,525	7.6%	333,085	7.7%	321,970	7.9%	282,815	7.31%	275,145	7.46%	243,850	7.51%	198,220	6.96%
Non-Indigenous / non-visible minority group	European, n.i.e. & n.o.s.	115,110	2.34%	34,695	0.76%	45,605	1.05%	41,285	1.01%	39,000	1.01%	36,135	0.98%	33,875	1.04%	25,870	0.91%
Total non-Indigenous / non-visible minority population (Note: Single responses only unless otherwise specified.)		2,936,240	59.73%	2,908,415	63.78%	2,911,300	67.32%	2,869,450	70.43%	2,862,405	73.99%	2,894,320	78.44%	2,612,565	80.45%	2,428,070	85.21%
Visible minority (Note: Statistics Canada defines visible minorities as defined in the Employment Equity Act which defines visible minorities as "persons, other than Aboriginal peoples, who are non-Caucasian in race or non-white in colour".) group	Chinese	550,590	11.2%	508,480	11.15%	438,145	10.13%	407,225	9.99%	365,485	9.45%	299,860	8.13%	192,330	5.92%	121,645	4.27%
Visible minority group	South Asian	473,970	9.64%	365,705	8.02%	313,440	7.25%	262,290	6.44%	210,295	5.44%	158,435	4.29%	118,165	3.64%	76,650	2.69%
Visible minority group	Filipino	174,275	3.55%	145,030	3.18%	126,035	2.91%	88,075	2.16%	64,005	1.65%	47,080	1.28%	31,095	0.96%	17,955	0.63%
Visible minority group	Korean	72,820	1.48%	60,495	1.33%	53,770	1.24%	50,490	1.24%	31,965	0.83%	19,050	0.52%	9,375	0.29%	5,595	0.2%
Visible minority group	Southeast Asian	71,785	1.46%	54,920	1.2%	51,970	1.2%	40,690	1%	34,970	0.9%	25,360	0.69%	17,540	0.54%	9,815	0.34%
Visible minority group	West Asian	69,270	1.41%	48,695	1.07%	38,960	0.9%	29,810	0.73%	22,380	0.58%	—N/a	—N/a	—N/a	—N/a	—N/a	—N/a
Visible minority group	Latin American	65,970	1.34%	44,115	0.97%	35,465	0.82%	28,960	0.71%	23,880	0.62%	17,655	0.48%	15,425	0.47%	6,265	0.22%
Visible minority group	Black	61,755	1.26%	43,500	0.95%	33,260	0.77%	28,315	0.69%	25,465	0.66%	23,275	0.63%	22,885	0.7%	14,510	0.51%
Visible minority group	Multiple visible minorities	58,840	1.2%	40,465	0.89%	31,160	0.72%	25,415	0.62%	14,465	0.37%	11,850	0.32%	7,600	0.23%	6,620	0.23%
Visible minority group	Japanese	44,125	0.9%	41,235	0.9%	38,115	0.88%	35,060	0.86%	32,730	0.85%	29,815	0.81%	26,225	0.81%	20,915	0.73%
Visible minority group	Arab	28,010	0.57%	19,840	0.44%	14,090	0.33%	8,635	0.21%	6,605	0.17%	—N/a	—N/a	—N/a	—N/a	—N/a	—N/a
Visible minority group	Visible minority, n.i.e.	18,080	0.37%	8,765	0.19%	6,465	0.15%	3,880	0.1%	4,195	0.11%	8,075	0.22%	3,765	0.12%	6,135	0.22%
Visible minority group	Arab/West Asian	—N/a	—N/a	—N/a	—N/a	—N/a	—N/a	—N/a	—N/a	—N/a	—N/a	20,090	0.54%	18,065	0.56%	8,780	0.31%
Total visible minority population		1,689,490	34.37%	1,381,240	30.29%	1,180,870	27.31%	1,008,855	24.76%	836,440	21.62%	660,545	17.9%	462,470	14.24%	294,885	10.35%
Indigenous (Note: Statistics Canada defines Indigenous identity as persons who identify with the Indigenous Peoples of Canada.) group	First Nations	180,085	3.66%	172,520	3.78%	155,015	3.58%	129,575	3.18%	118,290	3.06%	107,370	2.91%	149,565 (Note: Including multiple Indigenous responses.)	4.61%	110,520	3.88%
Indigenous group	Métis	97,860	1.99%	89,405	1.96%	69,475	1.61%	59,445	1.46%	44,270	1.14%	25,575	0.69%	22,295	0.69%	13,065	0.46%
Indigenous group	Multiple Indigenous responses	5,980	0.12%	4,345	0.1%	2,475	0.06%	1,655	0.04%	1,175	0.03%	1,200	0.03%	—N/a	—N/a	2,300	0.08%
Indigenous group	Indigenous responses, n.i.e.	4,560	0.09%	2,695	0.06%	3,745	0.09%	4,605	0.11%	5,490	0.14%	—N/a	—N/a	—N/a	—N/a	—N/a	—N/a
Indigenous group	Inuk (Inuit)	1,720	0.03%	1,615	0.04%	1,570	0.04%	795	0.02%	805	0.02%	740	0.02%	1,990	0.06%	745	0.03%
Total Indigenous population		290,210	5.9%	270,585	5.93%	232,285	5.37%	196,075	4.81%	170,025	4.39%	134,890	3.66%	172,470	5.31%	126,630	4.44%
Total responses		4,915,940	98.3%	4,560,240	98.11%	4,324,455	98.28%	4,074,380	99.05%	3,868,870	99.01%	3,689,755	99.07%	3,247,505	98.95%	2,849,585	98.83%
Total population		5,000,879	100%	4,648,055	100%	4,400,057	100%	4,113,487	100%	3,907,738	100%	3,724,500	100%	3,282,061	100%	2,883,367	100%

== Languages ==
=== Knowledge of languages ===
Top languages known in British Columbia 2021 census (Note: The question on knowledge of languages allows for multiple responses. The following figures are from the 2021 Canadian census.)
Language	Percent
English	96.69%
Chinese (Note: Including total responses to all Chinese languages and dialects)	9.94%
French	6.66%
Punjabi	6.41%
Spanish	2.93%
Hindi (Note: Note: Hindi and Urdu form mutually intelligible registers of the Hindustani language.)	2.75%
Tagalog	2.72%
German (Note: Including total responses to all High German languages)	1.76%
Korean	1.42%
Persian (Note: Including total responses to all Persian language dialects)	1.40%

The question on knowledge of languages allows for multiple responses, and first appeared on the 1991 census. (Note: The 1991 Census was the first to ask Canadians whether they could conduct a conversation in a language other than English or French.)

Knowledge of languages in British Columbia (1991–2021)
Language	2021 census		2016 census		2011 census		2006 census		2001 census		1996 census		1991 census	
Language	Pop.	%	Pop.	%	Pop.	%	Pop.	%	Pop.	%	Pop.	%	Pop.	%
English	4,753,275	96.69%	4,405,380	96.6%	4,209,595	96.63%	3,949,010	96.92%	3,763,045	97.26%	3,590,935	97.32%	3,183,500	98.03%
Chinese	488,470	9.94%	454,885	9.98%	440,475	10.11%	421,195	10.34%	375,815	9.71%	276,880	7.5%	170,735	5.26%
French	327,350	6.66%	314,225	6.89%	298,690	6.86%	297,715	7.31%	271,175	7.01%	250,365	6.79%	208,310	6.41%
Punjabi	315,000	6.41%	244,485	5.36%	213,315	4.9%	184,590	4.53%	142,785	3.69%	112,365	3.05%	77,830	2.4%
Spanish	143,900	2.93%	115,115	2.52%	97,195	2.23%	89,305	2.19%	77,300	2%	62,155	1.68%	47,025	1.45%
Hindi	134,950	2.75%	81,330	1.78%	66,870	1.54%	70,120	1.72%	63,750	1.65%	45,160	1.22%	32,790	1.01%
Tagalog	133,780	2.72%	113,265	2.48%	99,900	2.29%	71,880	1.76%	52,655	1.36%	40,240	1.09%	25,595	0.79%
German	86,490	1.76%	95,665	2.1%	97,265	2.23%	125,255	3.07%	121,995	3.15%	128,640	3.49%	127,165	3.92%
Korean	69,935	1.42%	57,490	1.26%	51,140	1.17%	49,130	1.21%	29,780	0.77%	17,655	0.48%	8,370	0.26%
Persian	68,965	1.4%	49,835	1.09%	39,715	0.91%	31,550	0.77%	24,060	0.62%	15,175	0.41%	7,915	0.24%
Russian	42,395	0.86%	33,990	0.75%	29,635	0.68%	25,980	0.64%	22,750	0.59%	19,335	0.52%	16,555	0.51%
Vietnamese	41,970	0.85%	34,140	0.75%	30,810	0.71%	30,755	0.75%	29,835	0.77%	21,740	0.59%	15,420	0.47%
Japanese	41,840	0.85%	36,990	0.81%	33,455	0.77%	33,265	0.82%	31,310	0.81%	27,685	0.75%	20,905	0.64%
Italian	36,370	0.74%	37,475	0.82%	35,890	0.82%	40,865	1%	42,720	1.1%	41,905	1.14%	41,640	1.28%
Arabic	35,595	0.72%	24,230	0.53%	17,475	0.4%	12,170	0.3%	9,960	0.26%	7,675	0.21%	4,735	0.15%
Portuguese	33,000	0.67%	23,260	0.51%	18,435	0.42%	18,435	0.45%	18,135	0.47%	18,755	0.51%	17,495	0.54%
Urdu	25,785	0.52%	16,750	0.37%	13,375	0.31%	12,255	0.3%	11,630	0.3%	7,490	0.2%	4,975	0.15%
Dutch	22,375	0.46%	24,060	0.53%	27,485	0.63%	31,220	0.77%	32,320	0.84%	34,780	0.94%	33,450	1.03%
Serbo-Croatian	21,620	0.44%	23,395	0.51%	20,250	0.46%	22,325	0.55%	20,195	0.52%	15,965	0.43%	8,640	0.27%
Polish	19,645	0.4%	19,175	0.42%	18,585	0.43%	19,520	0.48%	20,320	0.53%	20,800	0.56%	17,335	0.53%
Gujarati	14,340	0.29%	11,500	0.25%	9,325	0.21%	10,410	0.26%	10,520	0.27%	10,080	0.27%	8,120	0.25%
Scandinavian (Note: Total responses to all Scandinavian–North Germanic languages, including Danish, Icelandic, Norwegian, and Swedish)	12,430	0.25%	13,585	0.3%	14,220	0.33%	16,930	0.42%	18,105	0.47%	20,435	0.55%	22,755	0.7%
Ukrainian	12,205	0.25%	10,740	0.24%	11,410	0.26%	14,375	0.35%	17,295	0.45%	18,010	0.49%	21,070	0.65%
Romanian	11,215	0.23%	10,045	0.22%	8,630	0.2%	7,170	0.18%	5,760	0.15%	4,090	0.11%	2,075	0.06%
Tamil	9,735	0.2%	5,445	0.12%	5,345	0.12%	4,230	0.1%	3,270	0.08%	1,705	0.05%	865	0.03%
Hungarian	9,230	0.19%	10,495	0.23%	10,040	0.23%	12,045	0.3%	12,205	0.32%	12,885	0.35%	11,885	0.37%
Greek	9,005	0.18%	9,095	0.2%	8,070	0.19%	9,315	0.23%	9,325	0.24%	9,330	0.25%	8,960	0.28%
Hebrew	7,000	0.14%	5,450	0.12%	4,505	0.1%	4,430	0.11%	3,640	0.09%	3,490	0.09%	2,370	0.07%
Finnish	3,635	0.07%	4,030	0.09%	3,755	0.09%	5,320	0.13%	5,645	0.15%	6,230	0.17%	6,480	0.2%
Creoles	3,225	0.07%	2,485	0.05%	1,520	0.03%	1,350	0.03%	985	0.03%	825	0.02%	570	0.02%
Armenian	1,595	0.03%	1,680	0.04%	1,240	0.03%	1,145	0.03%	1,145	0.03%	895	0.02%	1,045	0.03%
Cree (Note: Including total responses to all Cree–Innu language dialects)	1,450	0.03%	1,600	0.04%	1,500	0.03%	1,655	0.04%	2,145	0.06%	2,400	0.07%	2,100	0.06%
Total responses	4,915,945	98.3%	4,560,240	98.1%	4,356,210	99%	4,074,385	99%	3,868,875	99%	3,689,760	99.1%	3,247,505	98.9%
Total population	5,000,879	100%	4,648,055	100%	4,400,057	100%	4,113,487	100%	3,907,738	100%	3,724,500	100%	3,282,061	100%

=== Mother tongue ===
Figures shown are for the number of single language responses and the percentage of total single-language responses. Numerous other languages were also counted, but only languages with more than 2,000 native speakers are shown.

Language	2016 census	%	2006 census	%
English	3,170,110	70.5%	2,875,770	71.5%
Punjabi	198,805	4.4%	158,750	3.9%
Cantonese	193,530	4.3%	131,245	3.3%
Mandarin	186,325	4.1%	72,160	1.8%
Tagalog (Filipino)	78,770	1.8%	50,425	1.3%
German	66,885	1.5%	86,690	2.2%
French	55,325	1.2%	54,745	1.4%
Korean	52,160	1.2%	46,500	1.2%
Spanish	47,010	1.0%	34,075	0.9%
Persian	43,470	1.0%	28,150	0.7%
Vietnamese	27,150	0.6%	24,560	0.7%
Hindi	26,720	0.6%	23,240	0.6%
Russian	25,955	0.6%	19,320	0.5%
Italian	22,680	0.5%	27,020	0.7%
Japanese	21,350	0.5%	20,040	0.5%
Dutch	21,020	0.5%	26,355	0.7%
Arabic	17,480	0.4%	8,440	0.2%
Portuguese	17,450	0.4%	14,385	0.4%
Polish	16,910	0.4%	17,565	0.4%
Chinese, n.o.s.	10,050	0.2%	132,755	3.2%
Urdu	9,885	0.2%	7,025	0.2%
Hungarian	9,025	0.2%	10,670	0.3%
Romanian	8,730	0.2%	6,335	0.2%
Ukrainian	8,630	0.2%	12,285	0.3%
Croatian	7,475	0.2%	8,505	0.2%
Serbian	7,045	0.2%	6,180	0.2%
Gujarati	6,895	0.2%	6,565	0.2%
Greek	6,115	0.1%	6,620	0.2%
Czech	5,920	0.1%	6,000	0.1%
Ilocano	5,240	0.1%	3,100	0.1%
Danish	4,665	0.1%	6,720	0.2%
Malay	3,895	0.1%	3,100	0.1%
Finnish	3,760	0.1%	4,770	0.1%
Tamil	3,615	0.1%	3,200	0.1%
Slovak	3,400	0.1%	3,490	0.1%
Turkish	3,145	0.1%	2,255	0.1%
Swedish	2,520	0.1%	2,875	0.1%
Athabaskan languages	2,310	0.1%	3,500	0.1%
Salish languages	2,270	0.1%	3,190	0.1%
Norwegian	2,005	0.1%	3,275	0.1%
Source: Statistics Canada 2006 & 2016 census

== Religion ==
Religion in British Columbia (2021)
1. Irreligious (52.2%)
2. Christian (34.4%)
3. Sikh (5.90%)
4. Muslim (2.60%)
5. Buddhist (1.70%)
6. Hindu (1.70%)
7. Jewish (0.50%)
8. Other (1.00%)

The largest denominations by number of adherents according to the 2021 census were Irreligion (atheist, agnostic, and so on.) with 2,559,250 (52.2%); Christianity with 1,684,870 (34.4%); Sikhism with 290,870 (5.9%); Islam with 125,915 (2.6%); Buddhism with 83,860 (1.7%); and Hinduism with 81,320 (1.7%).

Religious groups in British Columbia (1981−2021)
Religious group	2021 census		2011 census		2001 census		1991 census		1981 census	
Religious group	Pop.	%	Pop.	%	Pop.	%	Pop.	%	Pop.	%
Irreligion	2,559,250	52.06%	1,908,285	44.13%	1,388,300	35.88%	987,990	30.42%	568,170	20.94%
Christianity	1,684,870	34.27%	1,930,415	44.64%	2,124,605	54.92%	2,073,095	63.84%	2,048,000	75.47%
Sikhism	290,870	5.92%	201,110	4.65%	135,310	3.5%	74,545	2.3%	40,940	1.51%
Islam	125,915	2.56%	79,310	1.83%	56,220	1.45%	24,925	0.77%	12,715	0.47%
Buddhism	83,860	1.71%	90,620	2.1%	85,540	2.21%	36,430	1.12%	11,190	0.41%
Hinduism	81,320	1.65%	45,795	1.06%	31,495	0.81%	18,140	0.56%	8,980	0.33%
Judaism	26,850	0.55%	23,130	0.53%	21,230	0.55%	16,565	0.51%	14,685	0.54%
Indigenous spirituality	11,570	0.24%	10,295	0.24%	5,470	0.14%	2,315	0.07%	570	0.02%
Other	51,440	1.05%	35,500	0.82%	20,710	0.54%	13,500	0.42%	8,365	0.31%
Total responses	4,915,945	98.3%	4,324,455	98.28%	3,868,875	99.01%	3,247,505	98.95%	2,713,615	98.88%
Total population	5,000,879	100%	4,400,057	100%	3,907,738	100%	3,282,061	100%	2,744,467	100%

== Migration ==
=== Immigration ===
British Columbia immigration statistics (1881–2021)
Census year	Immigrant percentage	Immigrant population	Total responses	Total population	Source(s)
1881 census	27.8%	13,751	49,459	49,459	
1891 census	41.98%	41,210	98,173	98,173	
1901 census	44.24%	79,045	178,657	178,657	
1911 census	59.41%	233,158	392,480	392,480	
1921 census	49.67%	260,536	524,582	524,582	
1931 census	46.02%	319,529	694,263	694,263	
1941 census	37.26%	304,729	817,861	817,861	
1951 census	29.11%	339,197	1,165,210	1,165,210	
1961 census	25.97%	423,132	1,629,082	1,629,082	
1971 census	22.73%	496,660	2,184,620	2,184,621	
1981 census	23.28%	631,620	2,713,615	2,744,467	
1986 census	22.13%	630,670	2,849,585	2,883,367	
1991 census	22.27%	723,170	3,247,505	3,282,061	
1996 census	24.48%	903,195	3,689,760	3,724,500	
2001 census	26.1%	1,009,815	3,868,875	3,907,738	
2006 census	27.47%	1,119,215	4,074,385	4,113,487	
2011 census	27.56%	1,191,875	4,324,455	4,400,057	
2016 census	28.35%	1,292,675	4,560,240	4,648,055	
2021 census	29%	1,425,715	4,915,945	5,000,879	

The 2021 census reported that immigrants (individuals born outside Canada) comprise 1,425,715 persons or 29.0 percent of the total population of British Columbia.

Immigrants in British Columbia by country of birth
Country of birth	2021 census		2016 census		2011 census		2006 census		2001 census		1996 census		1991 census		1986 census		1981 census		1971 census		1961 census		1951 census		1941 census		1931 census		1921 census	
Country of birth	Pop.	%	Pop.	%	Pop.	%	Pop.	%	Pop.	%	Pop.	%	Pop.	%	Pop.	%	Pop.	%	Pop.	%	Pop.	%	Pop.	%	Pop.	%	Pop.	%	Pop.	%
China & Taiwan	258,420 (Note: China: 217,975 / Taiwan: 40,445)	18.1%	238,895 (Note: China: 199,990 / Taiwan: 38,905)	18.5%	209,575 (Note: China: 167,530 / Taiwan: 42,045)	17.6%	187,510 (Note: China: 145,315 / Taiwan: 42,195)	16.8%	152,390 (Note: China: 107,450 / Taiwan: 44,940)	15.1%	108,670 (Note: China: 78,655 / Taiwan: 30,015)	12%	61,025 (Note: China: 53,640 / Taiwan: 7,385)	8.4%	43,405 (Note: China: 41,170 / Taiwan: 2,235)	6.9%	38,330 (Note: China: 19,435 / Taiwan: 18,895)	6.1%	20,635	4.2%	14,499	3.4%	11,260	3.3%	15,150	5%	24,009	7.5%	21,523	8.3%
India	197,115	13.8%	162,645	12.6%	143,340	12%	119,265	10.7%	92,430	9.2%	74,360	8.2%	52,680	7.3%	39,780	6.3%	35,095	5.6%	12,120	2.4%	3,794	0.9%	1,535	0.5%	2,196	0.7%	2,207	0.7%	1,841	0.7%
Philippines	131,645	9.2%	112,100	8.7%	96,560	8.1%	69,200	6.2%	51,130	5.1%	39,220	4.3%	24,055	3.3%	15,565	2.5%	12,070	1.9%	—N/a	—N/a	—N/a	—N/a	—N/a	—N/a	—N/a	—N/a	—N/a	—N/a	—N/a	—N/a
United Kingdom	116,530	8.2%	123,810	9.6%	130,730	11%	137,460	12.3%	141,370	14%	150,285	16.6%	158,480	21.9%	164,515	26.1%	185,055	29.3%	181,735	36.6%	178,254	42.1%	178,926	52.7%	162,931	53.5%	169,057	52.9%	142,968	54.9%
Hong Kong	78,855	5.5%	74,210	5.7%	74,635	6.3%	78,060	7%	88,720	8.8%	89,195	9.9%	47,725	6.6%	24,050	3.8%	19,740	3.1%	—N/a	—N/a	—N/a	—N/a	—N/a	—N/a	—N/a	—N/a	—N/a	—N/a	—N/a	—N/a
United States	59,920	4.2%	57,780	4.5%	57,975	4.9%	56,560	5.1%	54,410	5.4%	55,110	6.1%	54,305	7.5%	56,265	8.9%	63,115	10%	57,720	11.6%	43,273	10.2%	41,845	12.3%	35,903	11.8%	34,706	10.9%	34,926	13.4%
South Korea	47,520	3.3%	41,515	3.2%	37,730	3.2%	34,395	3.1%	22,635	2.2%	13,960	1.5%	7,265	1%	4,120	0.7%	1,815	0.3%	—N/a	—N/a	—N/a	—N/a	—N/a	—N/a	—N/a	—N/a	—N/a	—N/a	—N/a	—N/a
Iran	45,975	3.2%	37,160	2.9%	30,050	2.5%	22,755	2%	18,450	1.8%	10,965	1.2%	5,670	0.8%	2,815	0.4%	1,100	0.2%	—N/a	—N/a	—N/a	—N/a	—N/a	—N/a	—N/a	—N/a	—N/a	—N/a	—N/a	—N/a
Germany & Austria	34,195 (Note: Germany: 30,910 / Austria: 3,285)	2.4%	38,715 (Note: Germany: 35,050 / Austria: 3,665)	3%	38,700 (Note: Germany: 35,100 / Austria: 3,600)	3.2%	45,710 (Note: Germany: 40,695 / Austria: 5,015)	4.1%	46,200 (Note: Germany: 41,260 / Austria: 4,940)	4.6%	47,000 (Note: Germany: 41,840 / Austria: 5,160)	5.2%	45,390 (Note: Germany: 39,885 / Austria: 5,505)	6.3%	44,795 (Note: Germany: 38,825 / Austria: 5,970)	7.1%	45,330 (Note: Germany: 39,240 / Austria: 6,090)	7.2%	41,525	8.4%	32,996	7.8%	9,173	2.7%	6,475	2.1%	5,809	1.8%	2,952	1.1%
Vietnam	32,390	2.3%	27,875	2.2%	25,845	2.2%	26,375	2.4%	25,675	2.5%	20,475	2.3%	15,295	2.1%	9,750	1.5%	6,385	1%	—N/a	—N/a	—N/a	—N/a	—N/a	—N/a	—N/a	—N/a	—N/a	—N/a	—N/a	—N/a
Russia & Ukraine	21,620 (Note: Russia: 12,170 / Ukraine: 9,450)	1.5%	18,420 (Note: Russia: 10,915 / Ukraine: 7,505)	1.4%	15,855 (Note: Russia: 8,795 / Ukraine: 7,060)	1.3%	14,940 (Note: Russia: 8,375 / Ukraine: 6,565)	1.3%	11,890 (Note: Russia: 6,285 / Ukraine: 5,605)	1.2%	12,975 (Note: Includes total persons born in all republics of the Soviet Union)	1.4%	11,915	1.6%	13,300	2.1%	15,050	2.4%	17,585	3.5%	19,209	4.5%	18,560	5.5%	9,647	3.2%	6,666	2.1%	5,008	1.9%
Fiji	17,130	1.2%	17,530	1.4%	17,555	1.5%	17,870	1.6%	16,435	1.6%	14,800	1.6%	11,730	1.6%	9,540	1.5%	7,530	1.2%	1,145	0.2%	—N/a	—N/a	—N/a	—N/a	—N/a	—N/a	—N/a	—N/a	—N/a	—N/a
Former Yugoslavia	17,030	1.2%	17,210	1.3%	16,875	1.4%	18,485	1.7%	18,105	1.8%	15,275	1.7%	10,870	1.5%	10,285	1.6%	10,745	1.7%	8,575	1.7%	5,259	1.2%	2,684	0.8%	2,598	0.9%	2,674	0.8%	457	0.2%
Netherlands	16,070	1.1%	18,225	1.4%	20,645	1.7%	23,130	2.1%	24,055	2.4%	25,770	2.9%	24,870	3.4%	25,255	4%	26,045	4.1%	22,010	4.4%	18,496	4.4%	4,524	1.3%	1,484	0.5%	1,224	0.4%	515	0.2%
Australia & New Zealand	15,680	1.1%	13,130	1%	11,895	1%	11,780	1.1%	10,740	1.1%	10,095	1.1%	9,300	1.3%	8,830	1.4%	9,710	1.5%	5,680	1.1%	3,162	0.7%	1,949	0.6%	1,865	0.6%	2,306	0.7%	1,915	0.7%
South Africa	15,380	1.1%	13,380	1%	12,815	1.1%	12,090	1.1%	11,015	1.1%	8,355	0.9%	6,065	0.8%	3,985	0.6%	3,740	0.6%	—N/a	—N/a	1,031	0.2%	696	0.2%	620	0.2%	656	0.2%	573	0.2%
Japan	14,940	1%	13,360	1%	12,355	1%	10,945	1%	9,090	0.9%	7,685	0.9%	5,740	0.8%	5,190	0.8%	5,295	0.8%	3,620	0.7%	2,761	0.7%	2,372	0.7%	8,787	2.9%	11,477	3.6%	10,934	4.2%
Poland	14,305	1%	15,115	1.2%	14,620	1.2%	16,165	1.4%	17,090	1.7%	18,275	2%	16,920	2.3%	14,620	2.3%	13,970	2.2%	12,195	2.5%	11,777	2.8%	9,281	2.7%	5,300	1.7%	3,923	1.2%	874	0.3%
Malaysia & Singapore	14,270 (Note: Malaysia: 8,845 / Singapore: 5,425)	1%	13,860 (Note: Malaysia: 8,435 / Singapore: 5,425)	1.1%	13,155 (Note: Malaysia: 8,310 / Singapore: 4,845)	1.1%	12,595 (Note: Malaysia: 8,290 / Singapore: 4,305)	1.1%	12,015 (Note: Malaysia: 7,695 / Singapore: 4,320)	1.2%	10,650 (Note: Malaysia: 7,130 / Singapore: 3,520)	1.2%	8,345 (Note: Malaysia: 5,865 / Singapore: 2,480)	1.2%	4,600 (Note: Malaysia: 3,110 / Singapore: 1,490)	0.7%	—N/a	—N/a	—N/a	—N/a	—N/a	—N/a	—N/a	—N/a	—N/a	—N/a	—N/a	—N/a	—N/a	—N/a
Italy	13,410	0.9%	15,405	1.2%	15,980	1.3%	19,215	1.7%	20,200	2%	20,485	2.3%	21,845	3%	22,725	3.6%	23,005	3.6%	22,430	4.5%	18,332	4.3%	6,446	1.9%	5,459	1.8%	6,034	1.9%	4,847	1.9%
Mexico	13,385	0.9%	10,375	0.8%	8,775	0.7%	6,385	0.6%	5,135	0.5%	3,295	0.4%	2,515	0.3%	1,730	0.3%	1,645	0.3%	—N/a	—N/a	—N/a	—N/a	—N/a	—N/a	—N/a	—N/a	—N/a	—N/a	—N/a	—N/a
Pakistan	13,345	0.9%	10,665	0.8%	8,570	0.7%	8,195	0.7%	5,475	0.5%	3,635	0.4%	1,815	0.3%	1,215	0.2%	1,045	0.2%	295	0.1%	—N/a	—N/a	—N/a	—N/a	—N/a	—N/a	—N/a	—N/a	—N/a	—N/a
Kenya & Tanzania & Uganda	10,825 (Note: Kenya: 4,800 / Tanzania: 3,135 / Uganda: 2,890)	0.8%	10,485 (Note: Kenya: 4,705 / Tanzania: 3,020 / Uganda: 2,760)	0.8%	9,635 (Note: Kenya: 4,520 / Tanzania: 2,725 / Uganda: 2,390)	0.8%	10,410 (Note: Kenya: 4,585 / Tanzania: 3,010 / Uganda: 2,815)	0.9%	10,025 (Note: Kenya: 4,105 / Tanzania: 3,295 / Uganda: 2,625)	1%	9,865 (Note: Kenya: 3,990 / Tanzania: 3,190 / Uganda: 2,685)	1.1%	8,740 (Note: Kenya: 3,385 / Tanzania: 2,925 / Uganda: 2,430)	1.2%	7,285 (Note: Kenya: 2,460 / Tanzania: 2,425 / Uganda: 2,400)	1.2%	6,750	1.1%	—N/a	—N/a	—N/a	—N/a	—N/a	—N/a	—N/a	—N/a	—N/a	—N/a	—N/a	—N/a
Scandinavia (Note: Includes Denmark, Finland, Iceland, Norway and Sweden)	10,505	0.7%	11,380	0.9%	13,120	1.1%	15,055	1.3%	16,235	1.6%	17,720	2%	19,275	2.7%	20,955	3.3%	23,500	3.7%	26,360	5.3%	29,438	7%	23,065	6.8%	21,672	7.1%	24,475	7.7%	12,422	4.8%
Romania	9,370	0.7%	9,000	0.7%	8,005	0.7%	7,360	0.7%	6,135	0.6%	4,920	0.5%	3,050	0.4%	2,150	0.3%	2,215	0.4%	1,650	0.3%	2,022	0.5%	1,223	0.4%	1,009	0.3%	986	0.3%	306	0.1%
El Salvador & Guatemala & Nicaragua	9,195 (Note: El Salvador: 5,775 / Guatemala: 2,025 / Nicaragua: 1,395)	0.6%	8,585 (Note: El Salvador: 5,420 / Guatemala: 1,930 / Nicaragua: 1,235)	0.7%	8,420 (Note: El Salvador: 5,635 / Guatemala: 1,565 / Nicaragua: 1,220)	0.7%	7,745 (Note: El Salvador: 4,990 / Guatemala: 1,745 / Nicaragua: 1,010)	0.7%	7,805 (Note: El Salvador: 5,100 / Guatemala: 1,725 / Nicaragua: 980)	0.8%	6,960 (Note: El Salvador: 4,540 / Guatemala: 1,575 / Nicaragua: 845)	0.8%	4,235 (Note: El Salvador: 2,580 / Guatemala: 1,015 / Nicaragua: 640)	0.6%	1,410 (Note: El Salvador: 975 / Guatemala: 335 / Nicaragua: 100)	0.2%	675	0.1%	—N/a	—N/a	—N/a	—N/a	—N/a	—N/a	—N/a	—N/a	—N/a	—N/a	—N/a	—N/a
Syria & Lebanon	8,995 (Note: Syria: 6,540 / Lebanon: 2,455)	0.6%	5,080 (Note: Syria: 2,845 / Lebanon: 2,235)	0.4%	2,470 (Note: Syria: 725 / Lebanon: 1,745)	0.2%	2,275 (Note: Syria: 585 / Lebanon: 1,690)	0.2%	2,010 (Note: Syria: 385 / Lebanon: 1,625)	0.2%	1,860 (Note: Syria: 255 / Lebanon: 1,605)	0.2%	1,315 (Note: Syria: 255 / Lebanon: 1,060)	0.2%	910 (Note: Syria: 165 / Lebanon: 745)	0.1%	525	0.1%	—N/a	—N/a	—N/a	—N/a	—N/a	—N/a	150	0%	152	0%	134	0.1%
France & Belgium	8,810 (Note: France: 7,025 / Belgium: 1,785)	0.6%	7,215 (Note: France: 5,705 / Belgium: 1,510)	0.6%	7,160 (Note: France: 5,340 / Belgium: 1,820)	0.6%	6,265 (Note: France: 4,760 / Belgium: 1,505)	0.6%	6,115 (Note: France: 4,445 / Belgium: 1,670)	0.6%	6,085 (Note: France: 4,310 / Belgium: 1,775)	0.7%	5,280 (Note: France: 3,535 / Belgium: 1,745)	0.7%	5,065 (Note: France: 3,530 / Belgium: 1,535)	0.8%	5,415 (Note: France: 3,755 / Belgium: 1,660)	0.9%	4,595	0.9%	3,798	0.9%	2,816	0.8%	2,201	0.7%	2,232	0.7%	2,179	0.8%
Brazil	8,765	0.6%	3,800	0.3%	2,875	0.2%	2,055	0.2%	1,640	0.2%	1,510	0.2%	930	0.1%	770	0.1%	655	0.1%	—N/a	—N/a	—N/a	—N/a	—N/a	—N/a	—N/a	—N/a	—N/a	—N/a	—N/a	—N/a
Czech Republic & Slovakia	8,420	0.6%	8,670	0.7%	7,885	0.7%	8,805	0.8%	8,480	0.8%	8,445	0.9%	7,805	1.1%	7,210	1.1%	6,305	1%	4,950	1%	3,361	0.8%	2,596	0.8%	2,171	0.7%	1,714	0.5%	589	0.2%
Portugal	7,785	0.5%	8,215	0.6%	8,135	0.7%	9,365	0.8%	9,980	1%	10,260	1.1%	10,295	1.4%	10,445	1.7%	11,165	1.8%	6,535	1.3%	—N/a	—N/a	—N/a	—N/a	—N/a	—N/a	—N/a	—N/a	—N/a	—N/a
Ireland	7,360	0.5%	5,885	0.5%	5,175	0.4%	4,195	0.4%	4,715	0.5%	4,850	0.5%	4,355	0.6%	4,120	0.7%	2,675	0.4%	5,650	1.1%	12,872	3%	12,394	3.7%	11,937	3.9%	12,816	4%	10,823	4.2%
Jamaica & Trinidad and Tobago	7,020 (Note: Jamaica: 4,295 / Trinidad and Tobago: 2,725)	0.5%	6,120 (Note: Jamaica: 3,505 / Trinidad and Tobago: 2,615)	0.5%	5,670 (Note: Jamaica: 2,870 / Trinidad and Tobago: 2,800)	0.5%	5,355 (Note: Jamaica: 2,795 / Trinidad and Tobago: 2,560)	0.5%	5,595 (Note: Jamaica: 2,910 / Trinidad and Tobago: 2,685)	0.6%	5,635 (Note: Jamaica: 3,020 / Trinidad and Tobago: 2,615)	0.6%	4,745 (Note: Jamaica: 2,600 / Trinidad and Tobago: 2,145)	0.7%	3,665 (Note: Jamaica: 1,995 / Trinidad and Tobago: 1,670)	0.6%	4,085	0.6%	1,595	0.3%	749 (Note: All individuals born in the British West Indies)	0.2%	384	0.1%	293	0.1%	279	0.1%	401	0.2%
Iraq	7,000	0.5%	5,550	0.4%	3,430	0.3%	2,230	0.2%	1,540	0.2%	1,040	0.1%	265	0%	175	0%	—N/a	—N/a	—N/a	—N/a	—N/a	—N/a	—N/a	—N/a	—N/a	—N/a	—N/a	—N/a	—N/a	—N/a
Afghanistan	6,250	0.4%	5,040	0.4%	3,520	0.3%	3,615	0.3%	2,275	0.2%	1,445	0.2%	400	0.1%	205	0%	—N/a	—N/a	—N/a	—N/a	—N/a	—N/a	—N/a	—N/a	—N/a	—N/a	—N/a	—N/a	—N/a	—N/a
Colombia	5,450	0.4%	3,915	0.3%	3,540	0.3%	2,600	0.2%	1,670	0.2%	715	0.1%	575	0.1%	475	0.1%	—N/a	—N/a	—N/a	—N/a	—N/a	—N/a	—N/a	—N/a	—N/a	—N/a	—N/a	—N/a	—N/a	—N/a
Sri Lanka	5,375	0.4%	4,585	0.4%	4,610	0.4%	3,825	0.3%	2,660	0.3%	1,720	0.2%	955	0.1%	600	0.1%	550	0.1%	—N/a	—N/a	—N/a	—N/a	—N/a	—N/a	—N/a	—N/a	—N/a	—N/a	—N/a	—N/a
Indonesia	5,215	0.4%	4,735	0.4%	4,825	0.4%	4,055	0.4%	3,160	0.3%	2,700	0.3%	2,290	0.3%	1,895	0.3%	—N/a	—N/a	—N/a	—N/a	—N/a	—N/a	—N/a	—N/a	—N/a	—N/a	—N/a	—N/a	—N/a	—N/a
Hungary	5,120	0.4%	6,175	0.5%	6,080	0.5%	7,520	0.7%	7,415	0.7%	8,425	0.9%	7,925	1.1%	7,960	1.3%	8,295	1.3%	7,240	1.5%	6,734	1.6%	2,059	0.6%	1,528	0.5%	970	0.3%	206	0.1%
Ethiopia & Eritrea	5,075 (Note: Ethiopia: 2,590 / Eritrea: 2,485)	0.4%	2,815 (Note: Ethiopia: 2,075 / Eritrea: 740)	0.2%	2,410 (Note: Ethiopia: 1,645 / Eritrea: 765)	0.2%	1,875 (Note: Ethiopia: 1,590 / Eritrea: 285)	0.2%	1,280 (Note: Ethiopia: 1,030 / Eritrea: 250)	0.1%	1,485	0.2%	560	0.1%	180	0%	—N/a	—N/a	—N/a	—N/a	—N/a	—N/a	—N/a	—N/a	—N/a	—N/a	—N/a	—N/a	—N/a	—N/a
Nigeria & Ghana	5,020 (Note: Nigeria: 3,585 / Ghana: 1,435)	0.4%	2,625 (Note: Nigeria: 1,740 / Ghana: 885)	0.2%	1,965 (Note: Nigeria: 1,230 / Ghana: 735)	0.2%	1,675 (Note: Nigeria: 820 / Ghana: 855)	0.1%	1,060 (Note: Nigeria: 450 / Ghana: 610)	0.1%	890 (Note: Nigeria: 285 / Ghana: 605)	0.1%	570	0.1%	410	0.1%	295	0%	—N/a	—N/a	—N/a	—N/a	—N/a	—N/a	—N/a	—N/a	—N/a	—N/a	—N/a	—N/a
Thailand	4,440	0.3%	3,640	0.3%	3,520	0.3%	2,380	0.2%	1,810	0.2%	1,315	0.1%	1,055	0.1%	505	0.1%	—N/a	—N/a	—N/a	—N/a	—N/a	—N/a	—N/a	—N/a	—N/a	—N/a	—N/a	—N/a	—N/a	—N/a
Switzerland	4,145	0.3%	4,385	0.3%	4,560	0.4%	4,690	0.4%	4,430	0.4%	4,690	0.5%	3,480	0.5%	3,420	0.5%	3,750	0.6%	2,785	0.6%	2,244	0.5%	1,454	0.4%	1,174	0.4%	1,059	0.3%	498	0.2%
Peru	3,510	0.2%	3,265	0.3%	3,085	0.3%	2,465	0.2%	2,045	0.2%	1,920	0.2%	1,725	0.2%	815	0.1%	—N/a	—N/a	—N/a	—N/a	—N/a	—N/a	—N/a	—N/a	—N/a	—N/a	—N/a	—N/a	—N/a	—N/a
Greece	3,350	0.2%	3,635	0.3%	3,445	0.3%	4,375	0.4%	4,070	0.4%	4,175	0.5%	4,330	0.6%	4,015	0.6%	4,200	0.7%	3,220	0.6%	1,424	0.3%	573	0.2%	511	0.2%	532	0.2%	483	0.2%
Chile	3,340	0.2%	3,275	0.3%	2,965	0.2%	2,650	0.2%	2,525	0.3%	2,535	0.3%	2,330	0.3%	1,640	0.3%	1,525	0.2%	—N/a	—N/a	—N/a	—N/a	—N/a	—N/a	—N/a	—N/a	—N/a	—N/a	—N/a	—N/a
Egypt	3,310	0.2%	2,705	0.2%	1,840	0.2%	1,710	0.2%	1,605	0.2%	1,435	0.2%	905	0.1%	600	0.1%	625	0.1%	—N/a	—N/a	—N/a	—N/a	—N/a	—N/a	—N/a	—N/a	—N/a	—N/a	—N/a	—N/a
DR Congo & Cameroon	1,300 (Note: DR Congo: 1,005 / Cameroon: 295)	0.1%	880 (Note: DR Congo: 760 / Cameroon: 120)	0.1%	775 (Note: DR Congo: 715 / Cameroon: 60)	0.1%	445 (Note: DR Congo: 430 / Cameroon: 15)	0%	330 (Note: DR Congo: 280 / Cameroon: 50)	0%	240 (Note: DR Congo: 220 / Cameroon: 20)	0%	210	0%	130	0%	130	0%	—N/a	—N/a	—N/a	—N/a	—N/a	—N/a	—N/a	—N/a	—N/a	—N/a	—N/a	—N/a
Total immigrants	1,425,715	29%	1,292,675	28.3%	1,191,875	27.6%	1,119,215	27.5%	1,009,815	26.1%	903,195	24.5%	723,170	22.3%	630,670	22.1%	631,620	23.3%	496,660	22.7%	423,132	26%	339,197	29.1%	304,729	37.3%	319,529	46%	260,536	49.7%
Total responses	4,915,945	98.3%	4,560,240	98.1%	4,324,455	98.3%	4,074,385	99%	3,868,875	99%	3,689,760	99.1%	3,247,505	98.9%	2,849,585	98.8%	2,713,615	98.9%	2,184,620	100%	1,629,082	100%	1,165,210	100%	817,861	100%	694,263	100%	524,582	100%
Total population	5,000,879	100%	4,648,055	100%	4,400,057	100%	4,113,487	100%	3,907,738	100%	3,724,500	100%	3,282,061	100%	2,883,367	100%	2,744,467	100%	2,184,621	100%	1,629,082	100%	1,165,210	100%	817,861	100%	694,263	100%	524,582	100%

=== Recent immigration ===
A large number of immigrants have lived in British Columbia for 30 years or less.

The 2021 census counted a total of 197,420 people who immigrated to British Columbia between 2016 and 2021.

Recent immigrants to British Columbia by country of birth (2016 to 2021)
Country of birth	Population	% recent immigrants
India	39,390	20%
China	31,445	15.9%
Philippines	21,225	10.8%
United States	8,760	4.4%
United Kingdom	7,670	3.9%
South Korea	7,225	3.7%
Iran	5,850	3%
Brazil	5,125	2.6%
Syria	4,955	2.5%
Australia	3,280	1.7%
Mexico	3,045	1.5%
Vietnam	2,845	1.4%
Hong Kong	2,515	1.3%
Ireland	2,420	1.2%
Pakistan	2,390	1.2%
Japan	2,090	1.1%
Russia	2,070	1%
South Africa	1,965	1%
Ukraine	1,935	1%
Taiwan	1,815	0.9%
Nigeria	1,770	0.9%
France	1,730	0.9%
Iraq	1,545	0.8%
Eritrea	1,515	0.8%
Germany	1,385	0.7%
Total recent immigrants	197,420	100%

=== Interprovincial migration ===
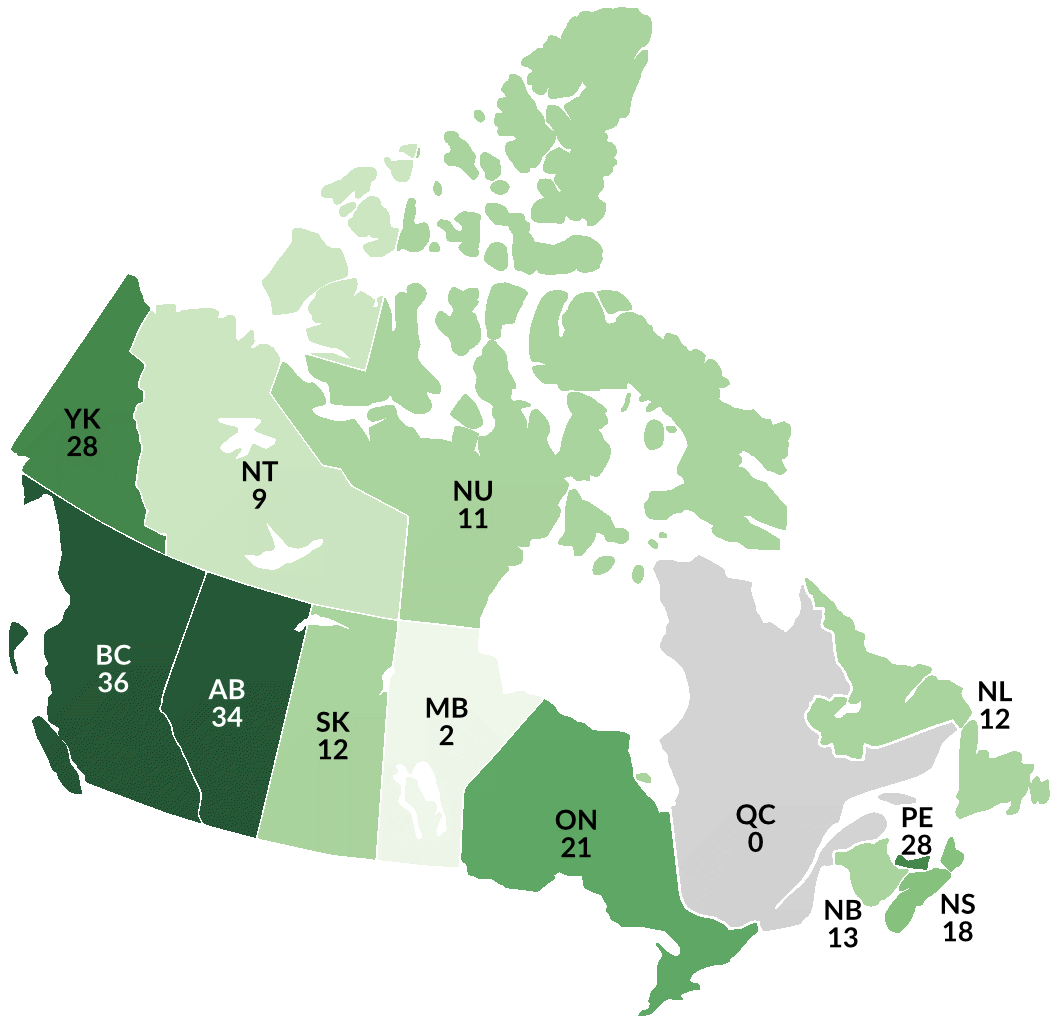
Number of years of positive interprovincial immigration since 1971 by province/territory

British Columbia has also traditionally been gaining from interprovincial migration. Over the last 50 years, British Columbia had 12 years of negative interprovincial immigration: the lowest in the country. The only time the province significantly lost population to this phenomenon was during the 1990s, when it had a negative interprovincial migration for 5 consecutive years.

Interprovincial migration in British Columbia
	In-migrants	Out-migrants	Net migration
2009–2010	▼49,469	▼40,741	▼8,728
2010–2011	▼47,854	▲44,433	▼3,421
2011–2012	▲48,593	▲51,304	▼ −2,711
2012–2013	▼43,830	▼45,698	▲ −1,868
2013–2014	▲52,281	▼42,806	▲9,475
2014–2015	▲61,026	▼40,647	▲20,379
2015–2016	▲63,788	▼37,215	▲26,573
2016–2017	▼57,210	▲38,376	▼18,834
2017–2018	▼55,300	▲41,311	▼13,989
2018–2019	▲55,612	▲49,501	▼6,111
2019–2020	▲71,180	▲61,122	▲10,058

== See also ==
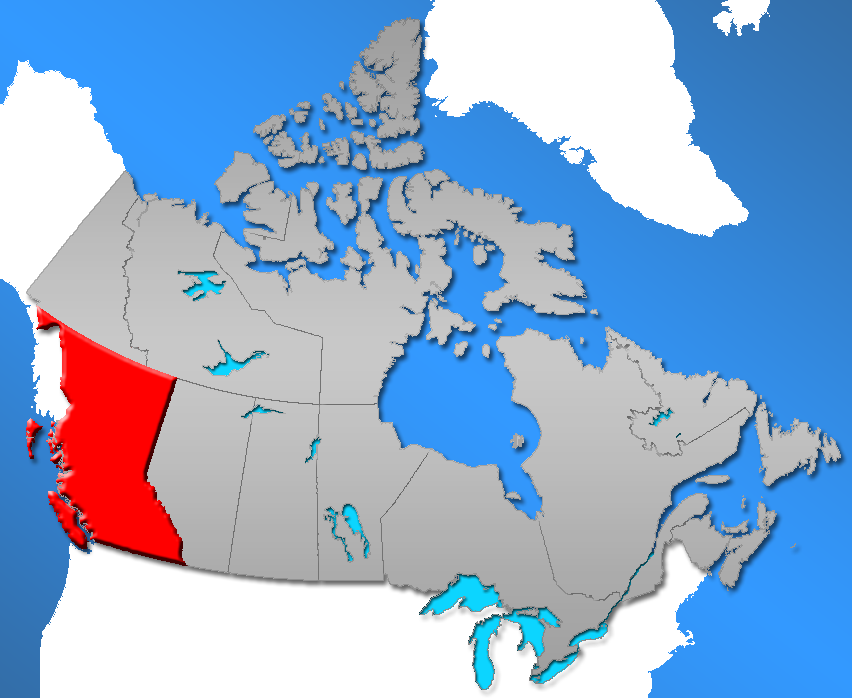
Demographics of Canada's provinces and territories
- Demographics of Canada
- Population of Canada by province and territory
- Demographics of Vancouver
- Demographics of Abbotsford, British Columbia
- 2013 Quick Wins ethnic outreach scandal
