= Tacheeda, British Columbia =

- Railway Point
- Interactive map of Tacheeda, British Columbia
- Coordinates: 54°41′00″N 122°36′00″W
- Country: Canada
- Province: British Columbia
- Regional District: Fraser-Fort George

Tacheeda is a railway point on the British Columbia Railway north of Prince George, British Columbia.
