= Yunesitʼin Government =

Band government of the Yunesit'in people

Yunesit'in Government
- Band No. 717
- People: Yunesit'in
- Headquarters: Hanceville
- Province: British Columbia

Land
- Main reserve: Stone 1
- Reserves: Stone 1a; Saddle Horse 2; Brigham Creek 3; Stone 4
- Land area: 1,593.62 km^{2} (615.30 sq mi)

Population (2024)
- On reserve: 238
- On other land: 34
- Off reserve: 234
- Total population: 506

Government
- Council: Anthony Billboy Jr.; Rosalie Montgomery

Tribal Council
- Tsilhqot'in Tribal Council

Website
- www.yunesitin.ca

Yunesitʼin Government, formerly known as the Stone First Nation, is a band government of the Yunesit'in subgroup of the Tsilhqot'in people, whose territory is the Chilcotin District in the western Central Interior region of the Canadian province of British Columbia. It is a member of the Tsilhqot'in Tribal Council. The people of the Yunesitʼin Government are known as the Yunesit'in in the Chilcotin language.

The Yunesitʼin Government's offices are located at the town of Hanceville, about 90 km west of Williams Lake. 51°55′10″N 123°02′30″W

== Indian reserves ==
Indian Reserves under the administration of the Yunesitʼin Government are:

- Brigham Creek Indian Reserve No. 3, 14 miles SW of Hanceville, 72.80 ha. 51°46′00″N 123°18′00″W
- Saddle Horse Indian Reserve No. 2, 8 miles S of Hanceville, 129.50 ha. 51°48′00″N 123°03′00″W
- Stone Indian Reserve No. 1, right (south) bank of the Chilcotin River, 4 miles west of Hanceville, 1588.40 ha. With IR No. 1A, known as the Stone Reserve, or simply "Stone" 51°57′00″N 123°08′00″W
- Stone Indian Reserve No. 1A, south of and adjoining IR. No. 1, 161.50 ha. 51°54′00″N 123°08′00″W
- Stone Indian Reserve No. 4, on Minto Creek, 8 miles SW of Hanceville, 194.20 ha. 51°51′00″N 123°12′00″W

== Chief and councillors ==
Position	Name	Term start	Term end	Reference
Chief	Ivor Myers	07/11/2008	07/11/2012	
Councillor	Molly Hink	07/11/2008	07/11/2012	
Councillor	Rachel Brigham	07/11/2008	07/11/2012	
Councillor	Douglas Myers Gabe Pukacz	07/11/2008	07/11/2012	
Councillor	Gabe Pukacz	07/11/2008	07/11/2012	
Chief	Russell Ross	08/11/2012	present	

== Treaty process ==
The Yunesitʼin Government is not participating in the BC Treaty Process.

== Demographics ==
The Yunesitʼin Government has 400 members, with 211 living on reserve.

== Social, educational and cultural programs and facilities ==
There is a youth centre and maintained hockey rink; the school does not have a gym but there is a ball-hockey court outside.

== See also ==
- Carrier-Chilcotin Tribal Council
