= Yunesitʼin =

Tsilhqotʼin First Nation of British Columbia

The Yunesitʼin are a First Nations people in the Chilcotin District of the Canadian province of British Columbia. They are a subgroup of the Tsilhqotʼin people and reside around the community of Hanceville, an unincorporated settlement and Indian Reserve community on Highway 20 in the Chilcotin region.

Their band government is called the Yunesitʼin Government.
