= Family resource program =

Canadian community-based organizations

Family resource programs (FRP) are Canadian community-based organizations that intend to support families in a variety of ways through systems such as family resource centers, family places, family centers, and neighborhood houses. They can also be linked to schools, community centers, child care programs, women's centers, and native friendship centers. This includes programs such as Ontario Early Years and military-funded family centers. They are generally grassroots organizations that aim to be responsive to local issues.

Similar organizations or programs may exist in other countries under similar or different names.

== National Leadership ==
Families Canada is a non-profit organization that provides resources, national leadership and consultation to family resource programs and family serving agencies.

=== National Family Week ===
Families Canada takes on the responsibility of coordinating National Family Week. They work together with other national partners to produce a downloadable kit for use by families during National Family Week each fall.

== Principles ==
Family resource programs are based on the principles of supportive relationships, respect for diversity, growth facilitation and the importance of community-based development.

Some guiding principles of family resource programs:

1. Family support programs are open to all families, recognizing that all families deserve support.
2. Family support programs complement existing services, build networks and linkages, and advocate for policies, services and systems that support families' abilities to raise healthy children.
3. Family support programs work in partnership with families and communities to meet expressed needs.
4. Family support programs focus on the promotion of wellness and use a prevention approach in their work.
5. Family support programs work to increase opportunities and to strengthen individuals, families and communities.
6. Family support programs operate from an ecological perspective that recognizes the interdependent nature of families' lives.
7. Family support programs value and encourage mutual assistance and peer support.
8. Family support programs affirm parenting to be a lifelong learning process.
9. Family support programs value the voluntary nature of participation in their services.
10. Family support programs promote relationships based on equality and respect for diversity.
11. Family support programs advocate non-violence to ensure safety and security for all family members.
12. Family support programs continually seek to improve their practice by reflecting on what they do and how they do it.

== Key Characteristics ==
Family resource programs work with developmental parenting perspectives. They believe that parents can grow and develop and that the existing skills that parents have are starting points for more education. They also work with the belief that a parent's capacity is affected by their support network. A goal of family resource programs is to develop and contribute to strong networks in the community. They work in collaboration with communities to promote safe and cohesive neighbourhoods. They also require constant staff training, strong principles, and evaluation to ensure they are delivering quality programs.

== History ==
Family resource programs grew out of a variety of movements and organizations. The settlement movement began in London, England in the 1800s with an aim to bring together people of different classes in order to form a common purpose. The first settlement house in Canada was established in 1902 and was called Evangelia. These houses could offer food, shelter and clothing as well as education provided by members who came into the community. They also provided programs for art and sport. Family resource programs also grew out of early maternal and child health programs such as the Victorian Order of Nurses. The parent education program Nobody's Perfect was established by Health Canada in 1987 and has become the model for many programs that followed.

Toy libraries and drop-ins were major contributors to the current model of family resource programs. Joanna von Levetzow was a Toronto social worker who worked with children with disabilities and was interested in adapting toys to the physical needs of the children. She was inspired by the work of international toy lending libraries and worked to form an informal toy lending network in Ontario called the Canadian Association of Toy Libraries. In the beginning the members were mostly children's hospitals and treatment centres but others soon joined. In the mid-1970s, the National Task Force on Children's Play (under the jurisdiction of the Canadian Council of Children and Youth) were also defining the importance of play. Their findings led to the establishment of a Children's Play Resource Centre (CPRC, currently now part of the Society for Children and Youth of B.C.). Parent and family resource centres were beginning to open across the country.

Sherryl Smith, a community outreach worker with the Preschool Parent Resource Centre in Ottawa, organized a national conference for these parent and family resource centers in 1981. From this conference came a recommendation to form a national association they could belong to and benefit from. Thus the Canadian Association of Toy Libraries became the Canadian Association of Toy Libraries and Parent Resource Centres (TLRC Canada) in 1988. This later became the Canadian Association of Family Resource Programs in 1994. The organization was rebranded as Families Canada in 2018. Family resource programs have continued to grow and diversify, leading to the over 2000 present in Canada today.

== Models of Family Resource Programs ==
The following describe the main models that family resource programs correspond to according to their organizational goals and their availability of specific programs. Although these models were developed by the U.S. Family Resource Coalition, they also can be applied to Canadian centres.

1. Programs that provide comprehensive collaborative services: these are large programs that help with basic needs such as housing or food and that assist with job training and parenting skills.
2. Programs linked to school success: these are created to help parents to be involved in their children's education.
3. Programs that seek to enhance parenting skills and family functioning: these include drop-in centres, seminars, workshops and counselling.
4. Family support as component of other services: family support approach used to provide other family services such as childcare, support for special needs children, promotion of family literacy and abuse prevention.

Family resource programs can differ in reach as well. Some provide services only to a specific neighbourhood or community, while others are larger in scope, encompassing a whole region.

== Areas of Service ==
The B.C. Association of Family Resource Programs identifies five core areas of service:

=== Family Support ===
This includes services such as prenatal support, parent/child interactive drop-in, respite child-minding, clothing exchanges, health screening and clinics, special needs and nutrition information.

=== Play-Based Learning ===
This includes creative play opportunities, age-appropriate toys, toy libraries, child development activities and early intervention programs.

=== Early Learning and Literacy ===
This includes language development, through song and story programs, and early literacy projects.

=== Parent Education and Learning ===
This includes workshops and courses, parent support groups, and programs for young parents, often enabling them to finish their education. It can also include English classes for newcomers.

=== Information and Referral ===
This can include home visits, counselling services, family preservation, help with employment and housing and disability related services for children and adults.

== Family Educators ==
Family educators working with children and families come from a wide variety of backgrounds. They may have education in early childhood development, counselling, adult education or family support. Generally they work in a group facilitator type of role. They focus on the design and delivery of workshops and services.

=== Certified Canadian Family Educator Program ===
The Certified Canadian Family Educator Program is a national certification program for individuals who have the experience to provide family life education groups, workshops, and courses to families and individuals about relationships, parenthood preparation and life's key stages and events. Certification promotes professional accountability and identifies to the public which family educators have met these professional standards.

Requirements for CCFE include formal training (post-secondary), at least 150 hours practical experience and at least 3 letters of references. Candidates must have training/experience in the following areas:

- orientation to family education philosophy
- individual development, life stage development and family development
- families: definitions, meanings, understanding and sensitivity
- human sexuality
- interpersonal relationships
- values education
- group process
- program planning

Candidates must also provide their definitions, philosophy and principles of family education and why they have chosen the field of family education. Once certified CCFEs must uphold the principles of honesty, fairness, integrity, respect, mutual trust, positive attitude and continuous improvement.

== Funding ==
Family resource programs receive funding from various levels of government as well as non-governmental sources. At the federal level they may receive funding from the Department of Human Resources and Social Development, Health Canada, Citizenship and Immigration, or the Department of National Defence (in the case of military family programs). At the provincial level, funding can come from the Children and Families', Education, Health, Social and Community Services, Human Resources, Multiculturalism, Women's, and Economic Development ministries. At the regional level, funding can often come from school boards and municipal governments or CLSCs in Quebec. In addition to government funds, family resource programs can receive money from agencies such as the United Way of Canada, foundations, local service groups and their own fundraising activities. Because family resource programs fit into the many different mandates of government departments and levels, funding requires collaboration between many groups; consequently, funding can be very unstable and mismatched. A lack of adequate and stable funding has sometimes meant the closure, or reduction, of programs.
