= Raymond Culos =

- Born: April 18, 1936 (age 89); Vancouver, British Columbia
- Occupation: author

Raymond Culos (born April 18, 1936, in Vancouver, British Columbia) is an author who has chronicled the history of the Italian community in the Lower Mainland of British Columbia.

Culos is from an Italian family in Vancouver. He previously worked as a journalist, including on the paper L'Eco d'Italia.

Culos's three-volume community history, Vancouver's Society of Italians (1998), recounts the history of Italians in Vancouver, particularly of prominent families. His book Injustice Served: The Story of British Columbia’s Italian Enemy Aliens During World War II (2012) is about the Italian Canadian internment during the Second World War.
