= House dish =

Wooden dish used in First Nations ceremonies

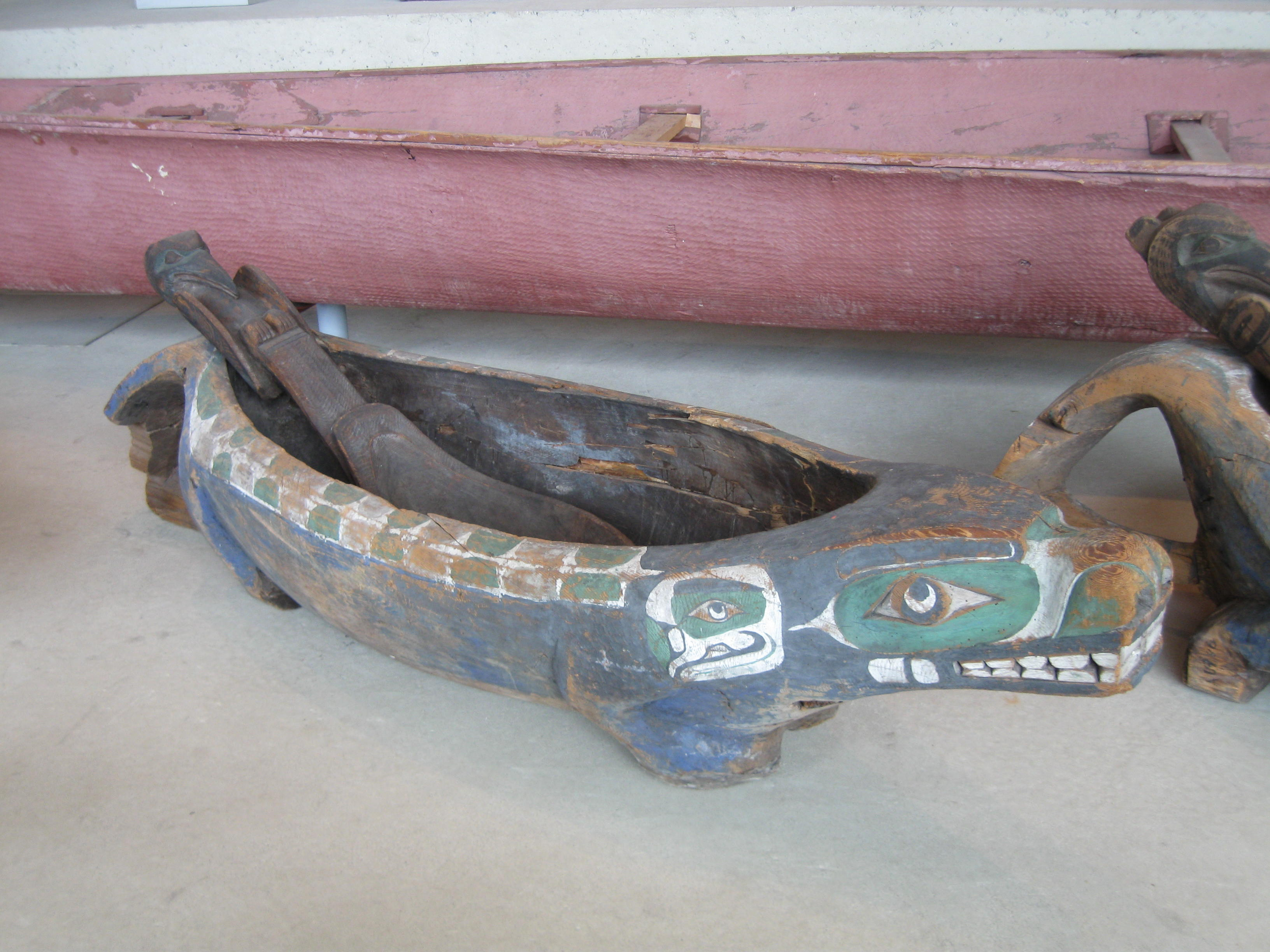
A house dish in the shape of a beaver, in the Museum of Anthropology at UBC

A house dish or feast dish (Kwakʼwala: Lukwalil) is a very large wooden dish, often ornately carved and painted in various human or animal figures, used in First Nations ceremonies in British Columbia.

House dishes may be reserved only for special foodstuffs and not used for more common fare.
