= British Columbia Forest Practices Board =

Government-affiliated forest watchdog in British Columbia

The Forest Practices Board of British Columbia is an "arms length" watchdog organization funded by the government of BC through the Forest Practices Code of British Columbia Act, that prepares audits and reports on compliance of the province and logging industry to the Wildfire Act, and Forest and Range Practices Act, with the intent of encouraging "sustainable" forest and range practices in British Columbia, Canada. and audits.

The organization also investigates complaints from the public concerning activities on Crown-owned land, and as a result may make recommendations and/or ask the government to review forestry operations approvals and law enforcement decisions.
