= Victoria Cool Aid Society =

The Victoria Cool Aid Society, also known as "Cool Aid", is a charitable organization that provides shelter and other services to disadvantaged and homeless youth and adults. It was founded in Victoria, British Columbia, Canada, in 1968 as an emergency hostel for transient youth.

== History ==
During April and May 1968, members of the Victoria Youth Council researched the extent and quality of helping facilities available to youth in the Greater Victoria area. For housing, the picture was “dismal” with the Salvation Army housing only men, and the YMCA housing women but charging $2.50 - $3.50 per night. For counseling, the outlook was even worse. This led to the idea of a hostel and an emergency-oriented, crisis intervention service, run by youth. Having obtained permission from a Vancouver group to use the name “Cool Aid,” the group began operations with a phone number and a single shelter.

Between 1970 and 1976 Cool Aid evolved into a more serious and adult run organization operating a shelter and medical clinic. In 1976 the organization was formally incorporated as the Victoria Cool Aid Society. Over the following years and decades Cool Aid has expanded its shelter facilities and increased the range of services to include medical and dental, counseling, employment and a community center which promotes healthy living.

== See also ==
Homelessness in Canada
