= Clayoquot Sound Central Region Board =

British Columbia Sound Agreement (1994)

The Clayoquot Sound Central Region Board (CRB) was created as a result of the historic two-year Interim Measures Agreement (IMA) in 1994. This agreement acknowledged that "the Ha'wiih (Hereditary Chiefs) of the First Nations have the responsibility to conserve and protect their traditional territories and waters for generations which will follow". The IMA was a negotiated agreement between the Central Region Chiefs (CRC) and the Province of British Columbia to define the terms of co-management of land and resource use and operations during treaty negotiations.

The IMA was extended twice in April 1996 and March 2000 to become the Interim Measures Extension Agreement: A Bridge to Treaty dated on March 28, 2000. As of April 2008 the IMEA has been re-extended for one further year with funds provided to support the Central Region functions and administration and the Central Region Board (CRB). The CRB was dismantled in 2009.

== Roles and responsibilities ==
The role of the CRB was to deal with all aspects of resource management and land use planning in the Clayoquot Sound region. The CRB was a final stop for reviewing projects and plans that pertain to any of the Central Region First Nation territories.

The CRB was responsible for reviewing and providing recommendations on all proposed development plans relating to Clayoquot Sound. The primary functions of the CRB was to:

- Provide advice to the Parties, including the Province of British Columbia and the Ha'wiih (Hereditary Chiefs) of the Central Region First Nations (Tla-o-qui-aht, Ahousaht, Hesquiaht, Toquaht, and Ucluelet First Nations) on planning processes and strategic initiatives affecting resource management and land use planning;
- Participate in the development of a regional economic development strategy;
- Review plans related to the alienation, conservation and protection of land, water or marine resources;
- Monitor the activities of the Clayoquot Sound Planning Process, which implements the Scientific Panel recommendations and other resource and land use planning initiatives agreed to by the Parties (CRB, 2008b);
- Initiate new work where necessary;
- Monitor the fiduciary obligations of the Crown;
- Hear public concerns on resource management and land-use planning, and make recommendations to the Parties;
- Carry out planning tasks or projects as directed by the Parties; and
- Develop an annual operational plan for review and approval by the Parties.

When reviewing and making recommendations on resource and land use plans, the CRB consulted with local communities at the direction of either the CRC or the Provincial Government.

The NTC did not have any formal relationships or direct dealings (e.g., through joint meetings or strategic planning sessions) with the NEDC, CRB or CRMB, but all of these bodies served the Central Region First Nations.

== Structure ==
The CRB linked the Central Region First Nations, the provincial government and local communities in "a joint management process for resource management and land use planning" (CRB, 2008c). The Central Region Chiefs did not control the CRB but had representatives that sit on the board. Administratively, the CRB consisted of five First Nations representatives (one from each Nation), five non-Native representatives appointed by the Province of British Columbia, and two co-chairs – one First Nation and one provincially appointed.

The CRB reported to the Central Region chiefs through the First Nations co-chief and the CRC executive director. The executive director, who was currently Jackie Godfrey, is the "face" of the CRC. The non-First Nations representatives reported to the province through the provincially appointed co-chair.

== Administration ==
The CRB maintained an office in the Central Region Chiefs Administrative Building on the Itatsoo Reserve. The director of the secretariat was Peter Ayres.
