= Cannabis in British Columbia =

Map of age of legal cannabis use per province Minimum age is 21 Minimum age is 19 Minimum age is 18

Cannabis in British Columbia (BC) relates to a number of legislative, legal, and cultural events surrounding the use and cultivation of cannabis in the Canadian province of British Columbia. As with the rest of Canada, cannabis became legalized on 17 October 2018, following the enactment of the Cannabis Act, or Bill C-45. Prior to that, though the drug was illegal in Canada (with exceptions for medical use), its recreational use was often tolerated and was more commonplace in the province of BC as compared to most of the rest of the country. The province's inexpensive hydroelectric power and abundance of water and sunshine—in addition to the many hills and forests (which aided stealth outdoor growing during prohibition)—made it an ideal cannabis growing area. The British Columbia cannabis industry is worth an estimated CA$2 billion annually and produces 36.6 percent of all Canadian cannabis. The province is also the home of the cannabis activist and businessman Marc Emery.

== Usage ==
A 2004 study by the University of Victoria and Simon Fraser University found that 53 percent of BC residents had tried cannabis at least once.

As of 2004, in Vancouver, there were several cannabis coffee shops where cannabis was smoked openly (but not sold) and personal use throughout the city was tolerated by local police.

As of 2012, British Columbia had the second highest cannabis usage per capita in Canada. In 2012, the province had the second highest percentage of males and the third highest percentage of females in the country who indicated they have used cannabis in their lifetime, with 54.6% and 38%, respectively. That same year, the province had the second highest percentage of residents using cannabis at 14.5%. In 2013, 14.2% of residents reported that they consumed cannabis in the past twelve months, the second highest in the country. In 2017, Statistics Canada reported that the province had the second highest per capita usage in the country of 24.60 grams per person.

== Cultivation ==
The early history of cannabis production was centered in hippie communities in the Gulf Islands and Kootenays, in climate conditions perfect for outdoor growing. However, it is believed that much of the cannabis currently sold for export originates from hydroponic grow operations in the Lower Mainland, with significant amounts added by outdoor growers throughout the province. According to the U.S. Drug Enforcement Administration, the majority of these grow operations are run by gangs such as the Hells Angels, and the Red Scorpions.

In 2008, a Royal Canadian Mounted Police inspector estimated the number of grow-ops in residential houses in the province to be 20,000.

A large amount of the province's cannabis crop is smuggled across the national border to the United States, up to 95 percent according to some US officials, as "B.C. Bud"'s value more than doubles in the US. As of 2010 experts estimate that the province exports CA$4–8 billion in cannabis annually, among British Columbia's largest exports with softwood lumber. Some Americans believe that the provincial government is, as Canadian Geographic reported that year, "quietly tolerant" of the cannabis industry because of its importance to the economy.

The lower mainland is home of the first purpose built industrial greenhouse called SunLab. Developed by Licensed Producer Tantalus Labs, the facility was designed to cultivate sustainably grown cannabis using captured rainwater and 90% less electricity than traditional indoor cultivation methods.

== Public views ==
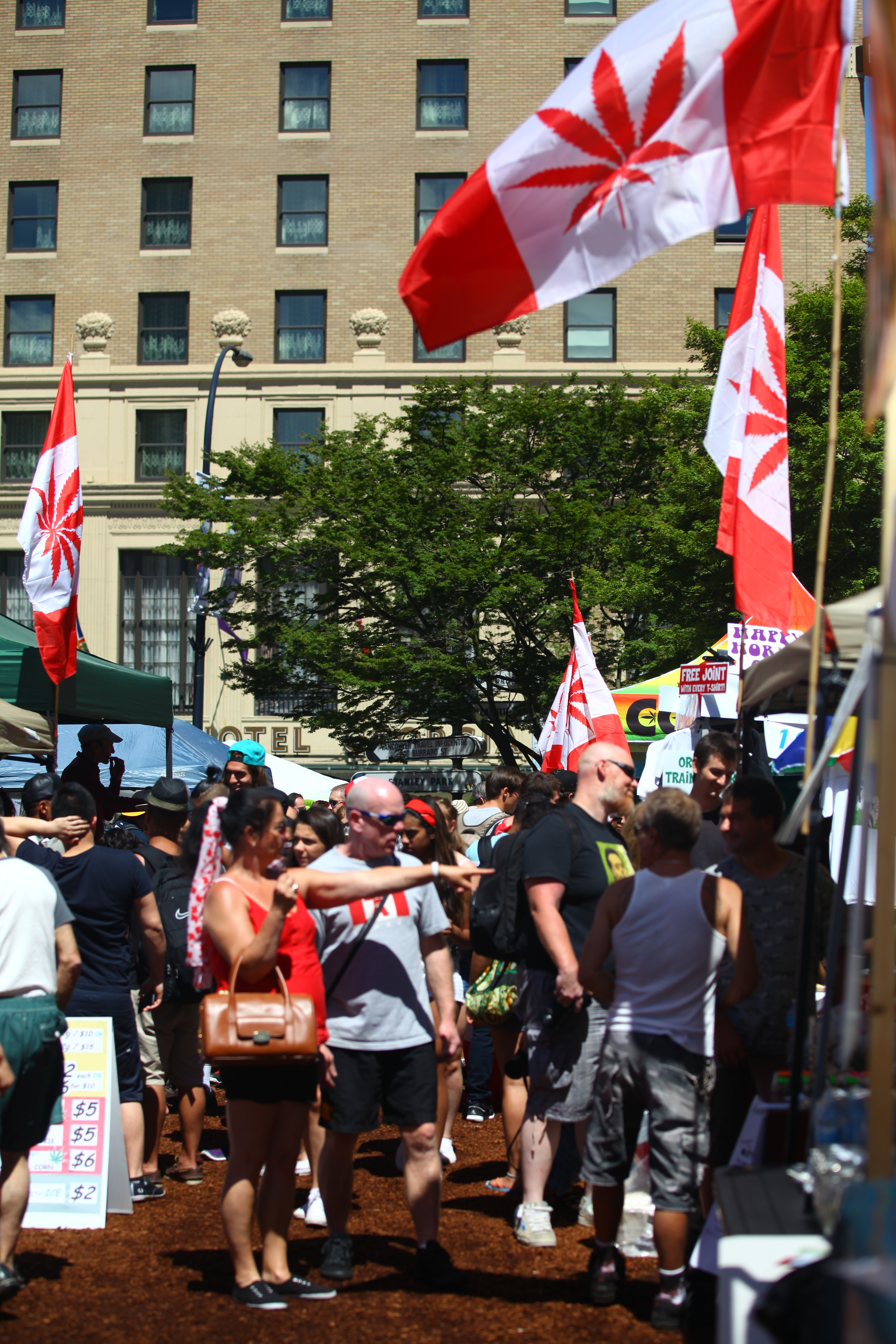
Cannabis Day in Vancouver

Opinion polling in British Columbia has shown that the province had greater support for cannabis legalization than any other Canadian province. A 2012 Angus Reid Public Opinion poll found that 61 percent of British Columbians supported the legalization of Cannabis, compared to 53 percent in the rest of Canada.

== Cannabis legalized for recreational use ==
Cannabis in Canada has been legal for medicinal purposes since 2001 under conditions outlined in the Marihuana for Medical Purposes Regulations, later superseded by the Access to Cannabis for Medical Purposes Regulations, issued by Health Canada and seed, grain, and fibre production was permitted under licence by Health Canada.

The federal Cannabis Act, legalizing cannabis for recreational use, came into effect on 17 October 2018. Each province and territory set its own laws for various aspects, such as the legal age, whether householders can grow cannabis and the method of retail sales. The latter aspect varies as to ownership of retail outlets (by the provincial government or private enterprise) but all provinces and territories include an option for on-line sales.

After public consultation, British Columbia released a provincial regulatory framework for the sale and use of cannabis for recreational use. The framework proposed the minimum age to possess, purchase and consume cannabis would be 19 years old, which is the same age to buy alcohol. There would be a government-run wholesale distribution model, although private and publicly run retail stores would operate. Cannabis consumption would be allowed in any public area where vaping and smoking is permitted, however, if the area is frequented by children, cannabis would be banned. Drug impaired driving will continue to be illegal.

In early October 2018, BC released its final set of rules and plans, replacing the July 2018 Interim Licensing Regulation. The new release provides specifics as to the licensing of stores and marketers, background checks, and enforcement methods and penalties for non-compliance by companies which have a licence. The regulations include a maximum household possession limit of 1,000 grams but only 30 grams in public, no smoking or vaping in indoor public places (except in designated rooms), provincial parks, near schools, in vehicles, on boats, near bus stops, and within six meters of any doorway, window or air intake. (There are fewer restrictions as to where cannabis for medical use may be consumed.) Cannabis products that are allowed to be sold include oils, such as capsules tinctures and topical products cannabis plants or cannabis seeds, cannabis products marketed for pets and soap or bath products containing cannabis. Initially, there was only one cannabis store in B.C. (Kamloops) operated by the government, but over 100 private retailers had applied for licences. Stores will require municipal consent prior to approval.

== See also ==
- BC Cannabis Stores
- Brian Taylor (British Columbia politician)
