= Conservation status of British Columbia salmonids =

British Columbia hosts 22 species of native and introduced salmonids. This list reflects the conservation status of British Columbia salmonids with status from the B.C. Species and Ecosystems Explorer, current as of August 2023. Status definitions were taken from NatureServe.

== Definitions ==
=== Provincial status (S) ===
- X = presumed extirpated
- H = historical (species)/possibly extirpated (communities)
- 1 = critically imperiled
- 2 = imperiled
- 3 = special concern, vulnerable to extirpation or extinction
- 4 = apparently secure
- 5 = demonstrably widespread, abundant, and secure.
- NA = not applicable
- NR = unranked
- U = unrankable

=== B. C. List ===
- Red: Includes any indigenous species or subspecies that have, or are candidates for, extirpated, endangered, or threatened status in British Columbia. Extirpated taxa no longer exist in the wild in British Columbia, but do occur elsewhere. Endangered taxa are facing imminent extirpation or extinction. Threatened taxa are likely to become endangered if limiting factors are not reversed. Not all Red-listed taxa will necessarily become formally designated. Placing taxa on these lists flags them as being at risk and requiring investigation.
- Blue: Includes any indigenous species or subspecies considered to be of special concern (formerly vulnerable) in British Columbia. Taxa of special concern have characteristics that make them particularly sensitive or vulnerable to human activities or natural events. Blue-listed taxa are at risk, but are not extirpated, endangered or threatened.
- Yellow: Includes species that are apparently secure and not at risk of extinction. Yellow-listed species may have red- or blue-listed subspecies.
- Exotic: Species that have been moved beyond their natural range as a result of human activity. Exotic species are also known as alien species, foreign species, introduced species, non-indigenous species and non-native species. Exotic species are excluded from the Red, Blue and Yellow Lists as a Provincial Conservation Status Rank is not applicable (i.e. SNA).

== Status by species ==
Species	Provincial Status	B.C. List
Arctic cisco Coregonus autumnalis	S1, S2 (2019)	Red
Arctic grayling Thymallus arcticus	S4 (2004)	Yellow
Atlantic salmon Salmo salar	SNA (2019)	Exotic
Broad whitefish Coregonus nasus	S2 (2019)	Red
Brook trout Salvelinus fontinalis	SNA (2019)	Exotic
Brown trout Salmo trutta	SNA (2019)	Exotic
Bull trout Salvelinus confluentus	S3, S4 (2018)	Blue
Chinook salmon Oncorhynchus tshawytscha	SNR (2019)	Not Reviewed
Chum salmon Oncorhynchus keta	SNR (2019)	Not Reviewed
Cisco Coregonus artedi	S2 (2019)	Red
Coho salmon Oncorhynchus kisutch	SNR (2019)	Not Reviewed
Cutthroat trout Oncorhynchus clarkii clarkii & clarkii subspecies	S3, S4 (2004)	Blue
Dolly Varden trout Salvelinus malma	S4 (2012)	Yellow
Inconnu Stenodus nelma	S3 (2019)	Blue
Lake trout Salvelinus namaycush	S4 (2019)	Yellow
Lake whitefish Coregonus clupeaformis	S5 (2019)	Yellow
Mountain whitefish Prosopium williamsoni	S5 (2019)	Yellow
Pink salmon Oncorhynchus gorbuscha	SNR (2019)	Not Reviewed
Pygmy whitefish Prosopium coulterii	S4 (2019)	Yellow
Rainbow trout Oncorhynchus mykiss - large lake piscivore ecotype	S4 (2012)	Yellow
Rainbow trout Oncorhynchus mykiss	S5 (2011)	Yellow
Round whitefish Prosopium cylindraceum	S4 (2019)	Yellow
Sockeye salmon Oncorhynchus nerka	SNR (2019)	Not Reviewed
Westslope cutthroat trout Oncorhynchus clarkii lewisi	S2, S3 (2018)	Blue
