= List of historic places in British Columbia =

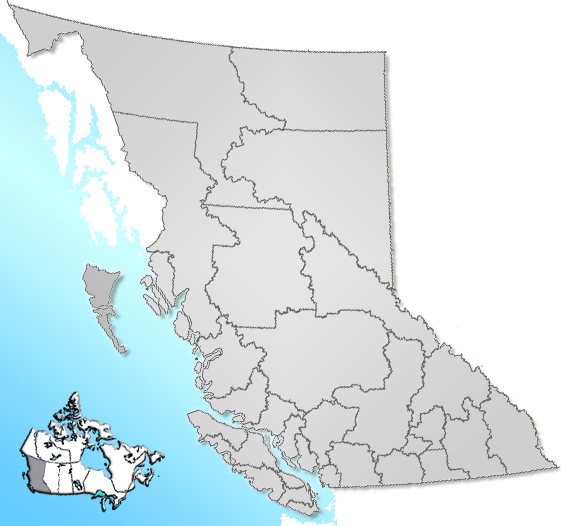

The following articles list the historic places in the province of British Columbia, Canada, entered on the Canadian Register of Historic Places, whether they are federal, provincial, or municipal. They are divided by regional districts.

- British Columbia Coast
  - Alberni-Clayoquot
  - British Columbia Coast
  - Capital Region (excluding Victoria)
  - Comox Valley
  - Cowichan Valley
  - Nanaimo
  - Strathcona (excluding mainland)
  - Victoria
- British Columbia Interior
  - Central Kootenay
  - Central Okanagan
  - Columbia-Shuswap
  - East Kootenay
  - Kootenay Boundary
  - North Okanagan
  - Northern and Central British Columbia Interior
  - Okanagan-Similkameen
  - Thompson-Nicola
  - Squamish-Lillooet
- Lower Mainland
  - Fraser Valley
  - Greater Vancouver
    - Vancouver
    - New Westminster
    - North Shore
    - Surrey

== See also ==
- Media related to Cultural heritage monuments in British Columbia at Wikimedia Commons
- List of National Historic Sites of Canada in British Columbia
