= This Means War (film) =

2012 American romantic comedy spy film by McG

- Theatrical release poster
- Directed by: McG
- Screenplay by: Timothy Dowling; Simon Kinberg
- Story by: Timothy Dowling; Marcus Gautesen
- Produced by: Robert Simonds; James Lassiter; Will Smith; Simon Kinberg
- Starring: Reese Witherspoon; Chris Pine; Tom Hardy; Til Schweiger
- Cinematography: Russell Carpenter
- Edited by: Nicolas De Toth
- Music by: Christophe Beck
- Production companies: Overbrook Entertainment; Robert Simonds Productions
- Distributed by: 20th Century Fox
- Release date: February 17, 2012
- Running time: 97 minutes
- Country: United States
- Language: English
- Budget: $65 million
- Box office: $156.5 million

This Means War is a 2012 American romantic comedy spy film directed by McG, produced by Will Smith, and starring Reese Witherspoon, Chris Pine, Tom Hardy, and Til Schweiger. Production for This Means War started back in 1998, when 20th Century Fox acquired the script and had Martin Lawrence attached to star in the film.

The film follows best friends and CIA agents Franklin "FDR" Foster and Tuck Hansen, who discover that they are dating the same woman Lauren Scott, so end up competing for her.

Released theatrically by 20th Century Fox on February 17, 2012, This Means War received generally negative reviews from critics, who criticized the film's editing, humor, and writing, although its three leads' performances were praised. The film grossed $156.5 million worldwide against a $65 million budget.

== Plot ==
CIA agents and best friends Franklin "FDR" Foster and Tuck Hansen are deployed to Hong Kong to prevent international criminal Karl Heinrich from acquiring a weapon of mass destruction. However, the mission goes awry, resulting in the death of Heinrich's brother, Jonas. Heinrich swears vengeance against them. Upon their return to the United States, their boss, Collins, assigns them to desk duty for their protection.

Tuck is divorced with a young son, Joe. After attending one of Joe's karate classes, he attempts to rekindle his connection to his family, but is rebuffed by his ex-wife Katie. Tuck sees a commercial for online dating and signs up. He matches with Lauren Scott, a product-testing executive dealing with the recent engagement of her ex-boyfriend. Her best friend, Trish, enrolled her on the dating website. FDR insists on being Tuck's backup for the date and hides nearby, but Tuck and Lauren hit it off.

FDR runs into Lauren at a video store and hits on her, but she ignores him. Intrigued, he gatecrashes one of Lauren's test groups and coerces her into going on a date with him. FDR and Tuck discover that they are seeing the same woman, and decide not to tell her that they know each other, letting her instead decide between them.

The date with FDR does not go well at the start, and Lauren storms out. After arguing with him, she sees her ex-boyfriend and his fiancée approaching. Desperate, Lauren grabs FDR and kisses him, then lies to her ex that they are together and FDR plays along. FDR demands she explain what happened; they then talk seriously and hit it off. After dating both men a few times, including FDR taking her to privately view a collection of Gustav Klimt's major artworks, Lauren feels guilty and gives herself a week to make up her mind.

Both men bug Lauren's phone and her home so they can spy on her when she is on dates with the other one. They overhear her telling Trish that she is going to need to have sex with them both to decide which one is the right one. This leads to both men taking steps to ensure she does not sleep with the other.

FDR introduces Lauren to his family, and they have sex that same night. She chooses him, deciding to tell Tuck. FDR discovers that Heinrich has arrived in town to kill them, so interrupts Tuck's date with Lauren to warn Tuck about Heinrich. Tuck does not believe him, so they engage in an extended fight, during which Lauren discovers they are best friends. She angrily leaves with Trish, but the women are kidnapped by Heinrich and his men, who FDR and Tuck pursue.

FDR and Tuck rescue Lauren and Trish after a car chase. On Lauren's advice, they shoot out the headlights on Heinrich's SUV, sending the car rolling towards them. With Lauren standing in the path of the SUV, FDR and Tuck, on opposite sides of the road, urge her to come to their side, and she chooses FDR's side, while Heinrich dies when his car crashes.

Lauren has decided to be with FDR, and Tuck makes amends with him. Later, Joe is at his karate lesson with Tuck when Katie comes to pick Joe up. Tuck and Katie reintroduce themselves to each other and she invites him out for a meal as a family, as they had watched the car chase on the news.

Shortly thereafter, FDR and Tuck go on a mission. They are about to parachute out of a Chinook helicopter when FDR reveals that he will be marrying Lauren and asks Tuck to be his best man. He reveals that he had sex with Katie before she met Tuck, but no longer feels guilty as Tuck had sex with Lauren. Tuck reveals that they did not go all the way, so angrily tackles FDR out of the helicopter.

== Cast ==
- Chris Pine as Franklin "FDR" Foster, a womaniser who falls in love with Lauren
- Tom Hardy as Tuck Hansen, a divorced single father who also falls for Lauren
- Reese Witherspoon as Lauren Scott, a product-testing executive and the love interest of FDR and Tuck
- Warren Christie as Steve, Lauren's ex-boyfriend
- Til Schweiger as Karl Heinrich, an international criminal who wants revenge on FDR and Tuck
- Chelsea Handler as Trish, Lauren's best friend who encourages her to keep seeing both men
- John Paul Ruttan as Joe, Tuck's young son
- Abigail Spencer as Katie, Tuck's ex-wife
- Angela Bassett as Collins, FDR and Tuck's boss
- Rosemary Harris as Nana Foster, FDR's grandmother who raised him when his parents died
- Jenny Slate as Emily, Lauren's assistant
- Michael Papajohn as German Goon
- Rebel Wilson as actress playing Tuck's sister (extended)
- David Koechner as actor playing Tuck's father (extended)

== Production ==
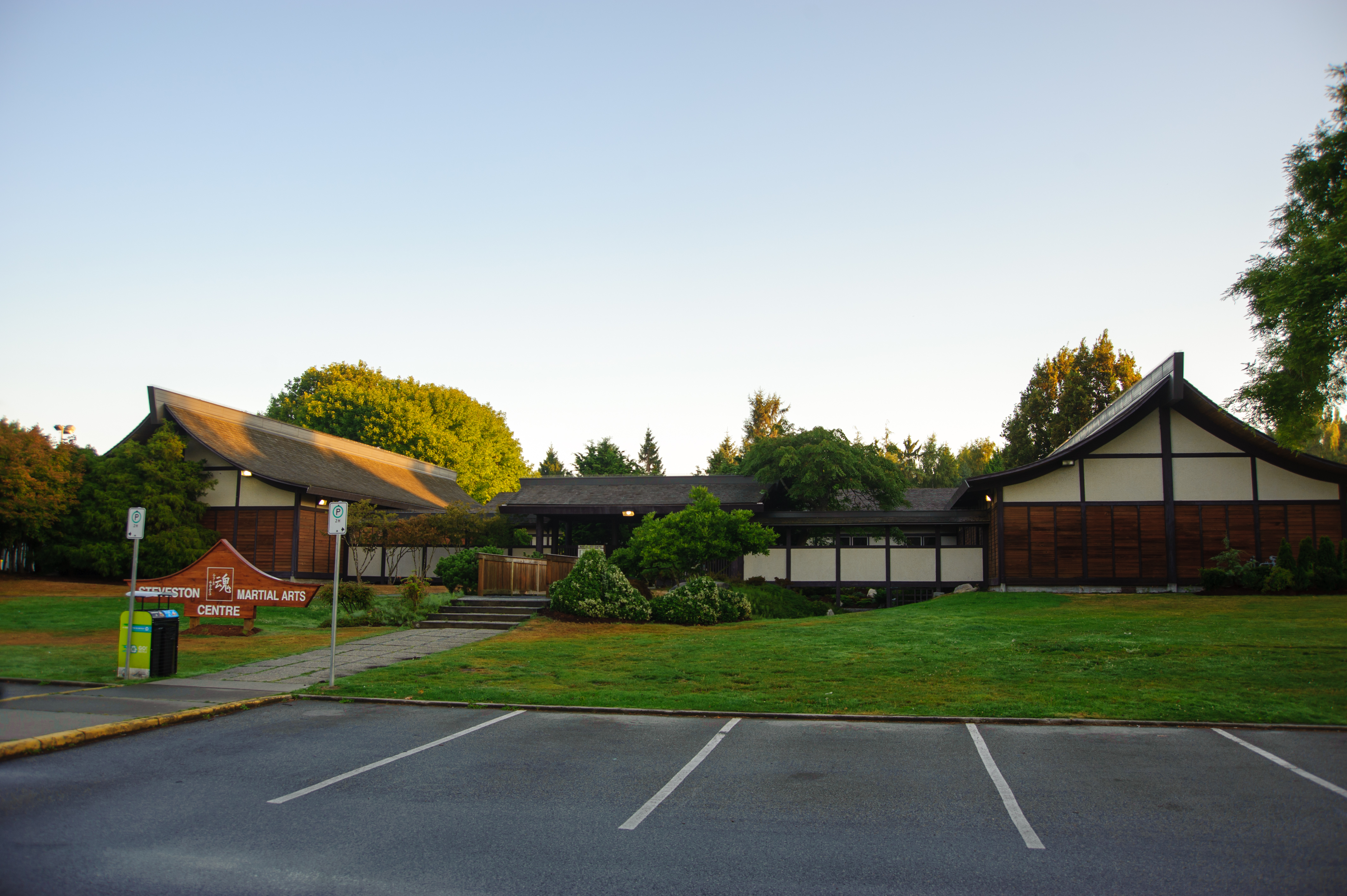
The Martial Arts Centre in Steveston, a listed building

In May 1998, it was announced that 20th Century Fox had acquired Marcus Gautesen's speculative script This Means War with Martin Lawrence attached to the star. The initial story revolved around two best friends who start to feud when a young woman moves into their spare room, with their conflict wreaking massive havoc across New York City. According to Entertainment Weekly, "the initial script dates back [...] at least about a decade," with Bradley Cooper, Seth Rogen, and Sam Worthington reportedly turning down the lead role. Going back even further, Martin Lawrence and Chris Rock also declined the part. Screenwriter Larry Doyle claimed to have read the script in 1998, and that in the draft, the protagonists were video game designers with access to guided missiles. In February 2010, it was reported that McG was in negotiations to direct the film which by this point had Cooper and Reese Witherspoon attached to star and had been rewritten so that it now focused two spies and lifelong friends ending up in a feud once they fall in love with the same woman. In July of that year, Tom Hardy and Chris Pine were signed on to play the two male leads after Cooper dropped out due to scheduling conflicts.

Filming took place in Vancouver and Steveston, British Columbia. The Martial Arts Centre in Steveston was used as the "Nakamura West Side Dōjō".

=== Post production ===
In January 2012, it was reported that This Means War was given an R-rating upon submission to the MPAA with Fox planning to appeal the rating. The MPAA upheld the R-rating upon Fox's appeal, citing the sex jokes from Chelsea Handler's character, and an edited version of the film was resubmitted and received a PG-13.

== Release ==
This Means War was previously scheduled for wide release on February 14, but 20th Century Fox postponed its opening to February 17, 2012, "to avoid a head-on confrontation with" Screen Gems' The Vow, which had been "expected to dominate" the box office on Valentine's Day. Instead, it was sneak previewed that "Tuesday evening at between 2,000 and 2,500 locations nationwide." During its first weekend ending February 19, it opened at number five behind Safe House, The Vow, Ghost Rider: Spirit of Vengeance, and Journey 2: The Mysterious Island with $17.4 million from 3,189 locations. The following weekend, it dropped to number seven behind newcomers Act of Valor and Tyler Perry's Good Deeds with $8.4 million. After a 17-week theatrical run, it earned $54,760,791 domestically and $101,730,488 overseas for a worldwide total of $156,491,279.

The film was released to DVD and Blu-ray Disc on May 22, 2012, with a rating of PG-13.

== Critical response ==
On Rotten Tomatoes, This Means War has a score of 24% based on reviews from 180 critics, with an average score of 4.50/10, with the site's consensus saying, "A career lowlight for all three of its likable stars, This Means War is loud, clumsily edited, and neither romantic nor funny." On Metacritic, the film has a weighted average score of 31 out of 100, based on 36 reviews, indicating "generally unfavorable reviews". Audiences surveyed by CinemaScore gave the film a grade A− on a scale of A to F.

Peter Travers of Rolling Stone found this "action-spiked romcom [...] death-sentenced by a lack of humour, heart, and a coherent reason for being. I could say more, but do I really need to?" Roger Ebert of the Chicago Sun-Times considered the film "an incompetent stupid action comedy" that was "so bad it's nothing else but bad" and observed that Witherspoon lacked the "irresistible raw sex appeal" to be "convincing as the woman [Hardy and Pine] go to war over." Richard Roeper of ReelzChannel called the film "one of the worst movies of this or any other year" and mocked Handler, who looked old, "lost," and "haggard" while delivering "her lines in a kind of flat monotone."

Todd McCarthy of The Hollywood Reporter recommended "the whole picture" be "sent back for a reshoot" as it "manages to embarrass its three eminently attractive leading players in every scene" and disapproved of Handler's performance, noting that she "has no sense of creating a character." James Berardinelli of ReelViews dismissed the film as "a 98-minute music video without the music -- all splash and little heart," joking that "we keep hoping the sleazy bad guy will show up and shoot" the main characters.

Claudia Puig of USA Today opined that "silly action sequences grow tedious and rarely blend with the wannabe madcap comedy" and concluded that McG "can't seem to decide whether he's making a spy action flick with romance interspersed or a rom-com peppered with action." Mary Pols of Time criticized the film's "terrible sense of chemistry all the way around" and declared that "even the pairing of Witherspoon and Handler [...] turns out to be a dud." Peter Debruge of Variety thought Tom Hardy and Chris Pine "are too busy trying to out-appeal one another to make the buddy dynamic click" and wondered if "it's the pic's cartoonish tone that keeps them from doing much more than look pretty, trading on the stars' blue eyes and impossibly big lips in lieu of their proved acting ability."

Lisa Schwarzbaum of Entertainment Weekly "enjoyed everything that's all over the place about the finished product" and stated that while it "may have been hammered together by brute Hollywood force, [...] there's this going for it: It's game to throw in anything that'll keep the motor running." Tom Long of The Detroit News characterised the film as "unpretentious goofiness" with "some nice light yuks" and believed "the whole sublimely stupid mess works." Betsy Sharkey of the Los Angeles Times warned that "if you can get past the gross invasion of privacy," there "is some bittersweet fun peppered by bursts of sharp patter," especially from Hardy and Pine, who electrified "the screen almost any time they're sharing it."

== Accolades ==
John Paul Ruttan who played Joe, Tuck's son, was nominated for a Young Artist Award for "Best Performance in a Feature Film - Supporting Young Actor Ten and Under".

== See also ==
- List of films featuring drones
