= List of historic places in the Columbia-Shuswap Regional District =

The following list includes all of the Canadian Register of Historic Places listings in Columbia-Shuswap Regional District, British Columbia.

Name	Address	Coordinates	Government recognition (CRHP №)	Wikidata ID	Image
Canadian Pacific Railway Station	Field; Field BC	51°23′46″N 116°29′26″W	Federal (1927)		Upload Photo
Canadian Pacific Railway Station	Glacier; Glacier BC	51°16′01″N 117°31′06″W	Federal (4572)		Upload Photo
Superintendent's Residence	Field BC	51°23′44″N 116°29′20″W	Federal (9833)		Upload Photo
Arthur O. Wheeler Hut	Glacier National Park BC	51°18′06″N 117°31′12″W	Federal (13084)		More images
Glacier Circle Alpine Hut	Glacier National Park BC	51°16′00″N 117°31′01″W	Federal (3898)		Upload Photo
Rogers Pass National Historic Site of Canada	Highway 1, Trans-Canada Highway; Glacier National Park BC	51°18′05″N 117°31′16″W	Federal (12562)		More images
Summit Fire Lookout	Mount Revelstoke National Park BC	51°06′00″N 118°04′01″W	Federal (4691)		Upload Photo
Boat Encampment National Historic Site of Canada	Big Bend of the Columbia near Red Rock Bay, under Kinbasket Lake BC	52°06′07″N 118°29′20″W	Federal (13039)		Upload Photo
Warden’s Cabin	Mount Revelstoke National Park BC	51°05′46″N 118°03′04″W	Federal (9676)		Upload Photo
Mount Assiniboine Lodge	Near Radium Hot Springs BC	50°54′55″N 115°37′01″W	British Columbia (18045)		Upload Photo
Birch Lodge	815 Mackenzie Avenue; Revelstoke BC	50°59′43″N 118°12′04″W	Revelstoke municipality (11780)		Upload Photo
McCarty House	400 Mackenzie Avenue; Revelstoke BC	50°59′51″N 118°11′49″W	Revelstoke municipality (11781)		Upload Photo
Revelstoke City Hall	216 Mackenzie Avenue; Revelstoke BC	50°59′53″N 118°11′46″W	Revelstoke municipality (11782)		Upload Photo
Revelstoke Courthouse	1123 Second Street West; Revelstoke BC	51°00′17″N 118°12′29″W	Revelstoke municipality (11783)		More images
171-1 Street SE	171 1 Street SE; Salmon Arm BC	50°41′54″N 119°17′02″W	Salmon Arm municipality (18764)		Upload Photo
Bank of Hamilton	190 Hudson Avenue NE; Salmon Arm BC	50°42′05″N 119°16′57″W	Salmon Arm municipality (18744)		Upload Photo
Bank Manager's House	660 2 Avenue NE (Harris Street); Salmon Arm BC	50°42′03″N 119°16′37″W	Salmon Arm municipality (18763)		Upload Photo
Baptist Church	191 2 Avenue NE; Salmon Arm BC	50°42′01″N 119°16′54″W	Salmon Arm municipality (19125)		Upload Photo
Canoe United Church	6861 50 Street NE; Salmon Arm BC	50°44′59″N 119°13′39″W	Salmon Arm municipality (19969)		Upload Photo
Collier House	720 2 Avenue NE (Harris Street); Salmon Arm BC	50°42′03″N 119°16′34″W	Salmon Arm municipality (18747)		Upload Photo
Edwards House	5051 11 Street NE; Salmon Arm BC	50°44′10″N 119°16′18″W	Salmon Arm municipality (19885)		Upload Photo
Gabe's Bunkhouse	251 5th Street SE; Salmon Arm BC	50°41′57″N 119°16′45″W	Salmon Arm municipality (19104)		Upload Photo
Hanna and Hanna Orchards	3181 11 Avenue NE; Salmon Arm BC	50°42′30″N 119°14′59″W	Salmon Arm municipality (19965)		Upload Photo
Haydock House	550 6th Street SE; Salmon Arm BC	50°41′45″N 119°16′40″W	Salmon Arm municipality (19107)		Upload Photo
Kuusisto Road	1400m of gravel road right-of-way extending north from 50 Street NW; Salmon Arm BC	50°44′11″N 119°20′39″W	Salmon Arm municipality (19968)		Upload Photo
Laitinen Farm	2131 50 Street NW; Salmon Arm BC	50°42′57″N 119°20′49″W	Salmon Arm municipality (19967)		Upload Photo
Lyman House	680 2 Avenue NE (Harris Street); Salmon Arm BC	50°42′03″N 119°16′37″W	Salmon Arm municipality (18748)		Upload Photo
M. M. Carroll House	721 2 Avenue NE (Harris Street); Salmon Arm BC	50°42′05″N 119°16′34″W	Salmon Arm municipality (18745)		Upload Photo
McGuire Lake Park	500 6 Street NE; Salmon Arm BC	50°42′10″N 119°16′38″W	Salmon Arm municipality (19973)		Upload Photo
McLeod Farm	3421 30 Street SW; Salmon Arm BC	50°40′36″N 119°19′11″W	Salmon Arm municipality (19886)		Upload Photo
Merchants Block	140 Lakeshore Drive NE; Salmon Arm BC	50°42′08″N 119°17′03″W	Salmon Arm municipality (19124)		Upload Photo
Municipal Hall	31 Hudson Avenue NE; Salmon Arm BC	50°42′03″N 119°17′05″W	Salmon Arm municipality (19108)		Upload Photo
R. H. Neelands House	671 2 Avenue NE (Harris Street); Salmon Arm BC	50°42′05″N 119°16′37″W	Salmon Arm municipality (18746)		Upload Photo
Old Section of the Cemetery	2160 Foothill Road SW; Salmon Arm BC	50°40′34″N 119°18′44″W	Salmon Arm municipality (20006)		Upload Photo
Peterson Farm	5540 35 Street NE; Salmon Arm BC	50°44′25″N 119°14′38″W	Salmon Arm municipality (19966)		Upload Photo
Presbyterian Manse	341 Beatty Avenue NW; Salmon Arm BC	50°42′04″N 119°17′20″W	Salmon Arm municipality (19105)		Upload Photo
Richmond House	1150 15 Avenue SE; Salmon Arm BC	50°41′20″N 119°16′20″W	Salmon Arm municipality (19970)		Upload Photo
Salmon Arm Courthouse	20 Hudson Avenue NE; Salmon Arm BC	50°42′02″N 119°17′06″W	Salmon Arm municipality (19106)		Upload Photo
Victory Hall	7210 51 Street NE; Salmon Arm BC	50°45′10″N 119°13′35″W	Salmon Arm municipality (19971)		Upload Photo
Salmon Arm Elementary School	451 Shuswap Street SW; Salmon Arm BC	50°41′48″N 119°17′06″W	Salmon Arm municipality (19084)		Upload Photo
W.K. Smith House	681 Okanagan Avenue NE; Salmon Arm BC	50°42′00″N 119°16′36″W	Salmon Arm municipality (19884)		Upload Photo
Wharf and Marine Park	750 Marine Park Drive NE; Salmon Arm BC	50°42′25″N 119°16′59″W	Salmon Arm municipality (19972)		Upload Photo
Deer Lodge Warden Cabin	Yoho National Park BC	51°30′N 116°30′W	Federal (3550)		Upload Photo
Elizabeth Parker Hut	Yoho National Park BC	51°30′N 116°30′W	Federal (3548)		More images
Lake O'Hara Warden's Cabin	Western shore of Lake O'Hara; Yoho National Park BC	51°21′27″N 116°20′19″W	Federal (21075)		Upload Photo
Horse Barn	Yoho National Park BC	51°18′47″N 116°16′55″W	Federal (2847)		Upload Photo
Kicking Horse Pass National Historic Site of Canada	Highway 1 - Trans-Canada Highway; Yoho National Park BC	51°26′04″N 116°20′53″W	Federal (10063)		More images
Stanley Mitchell Alpine Hut	Little Yoho Valley; Yoho National Park BC	51°30′00″N 116°30′00″W	Federal (7653)		Upload Photo
Twin Falls Tea House	Upper Valley Road; Yoho National Park BC	51°25′40″N 116°26′24″W	Federal (11592, (2837)		Upload Photo
Warden's Patrol Cabin	Yoho National Park BC	51°18′47″N 116°16′55″W	Federal (2860)		Upload Photo
Wiwaxy Lodge	Yoho National Park BC	51°30′N 116°30′W	Federal (3560)		Upload Photo
Yoho Ranch-Cabin	Yoho National Park BC	51°18′47″N 116°16′55″W	Federal (2859)		Upload Photo
