= List of historic places in the Strathcona Regional District =

The following list includes all of the Canadian Register of Historic Places listings in Strathcona Regional District, British Columbia.

Name	Address	Coordinates	Government recognition (CRHP №)	Wikidata ID	Image
Cape Mudge Lighthouse	Lighthouse Road, Quadra Island; Quadra Island BC	49°59′55″N 125°11′44″W	Federal (20778)		
Motor Vessel BCP 45 National Historic Site of Canada	621 Island Highway; Campbell River BC	50°18′06″N 125°53′28″W	Federal (12060)		
Nootka Lighthouse	Southern tip of Nootka Island; Strathcona A BC	49°35′34″N 126°36′56″W	Federal (20376)		
Whaler's Shrine Site National Historic Site of Canada	Yuquot BC	49°35′28″N 126°36′58″W	Federal (17981)		Upload Photo
Yuquot National Historic Site of Canada	Yuquot BC	49°35′33″N 126°37′19″W	Federal (15442)		
