= List of historic places in the Squamish-Lillooet Regional District =

The following list includes all of the Canadian Register of Historic Places listings in Squamish-Lillooet Regional District, British Columbia.

Name	Address	Coordinates	Government recognition (CRHP №)	Wikidata ID	Image
Britannia Mines Concentrator National Historic Site of Canada	Highway 99; Britannia Beach BC	49°38′00″N 123°12′00″W	Federal (7561)		More images
