= Lists of historic places in Canada =

Canadian Register of Historic Places logo

The list of historic places in Canada contains heritage sites listed on the Canadian Register of Historic Places (CRHP), all of which are designated as historic places either locally, provincially, territorially, nationally, or by more than one level of government. For convenience, the list is divided by province or administrative entities. Since there are thousands of historic places in Canada, this is an editorial choice and not official.

== Lists ==
=== Provinces ===
- List of historic places in Alberta
- List of historic places in British Columbia
- List of historic places in Manitoba
- List of historic places in New Brunswick
- List of historic places in Newfoundland and Labrador
- List of historic places in Nova Scotia
- List of historic places in Ontario
- List of historic places in Prince Edward Island
- List of historic places in Quebec
- List of historic places in Saskatchewan

=== Territories ===
- List of historic places in the Northwest Territories
- List of historic places in Nunavut
- List of historic places in Yukon

== See also ==
- National Historic Sites of Canada
