= List of historic places in British Columbia Coast =

The following list includes all of the Canadian Register of Historic Places listings in the British Columbia Coast area, excluding Vancouver Island. This includes the following districts:

- Central Coast Regional District
- Kitimat-Stikine Regional District
- Mount Waddington Regional District
- Powell River Regional District
- Skeena-Queen Charlotte Regional District
- Strathcona Regional District
- Sunshine Coast Regional District

Name	Address	Coordinates	Government recognition (CRHP №)	Wikidata ID	Image
Kitwankul National Historic Site of Canada	Near the confluence of Kitwankul Creek and the Kitwanka River, in Kitwankul Indian Reserve 1 Gitanyow BC	55°15′48″N 128°03′41″W	Federal (19634)		
Dorreen Store and Railway Station	Kitimat-Stikine C BC	54°50′27″N 128°20′38″W	Kitimat-Stikine C municipality (20268)		Upload Photo
Meanskinisht Cemetery	Cedarvale Ferry Road; Cedarvale BC	55°01′22″N 128°18′44″W	Cedarvale municipality (20269)		Upload Photo
Gitwangak Battle Hill		55°7′10″N 128°1′1″W	Federal (7633)	Q1527840	More images
Metlakatla Pass		54°19′27″N 130°27′29″W	Federal (10473)	Q23768240	Upload Photo
Kitselas Canyon		54°36′0″N 128°25′59″W	Federal (10522)	Q1546580	More images
Pulteney Point Lighthouse	Southwestern tip of Malcolm Island; Port McNeill BC	50°37′50″N 127°09′18″W	Federal (200838)		
Powell River Townsite Historic District National Historic Site of Canada	Powell River; Powell River BC	49°52′05″N 124°32′49″W	Federal (10728)		
Dryad Point Lighthouse	Northeast tip of Campbell Island; Central Coast Regional District BC	52°11′06″N 128°06′42″W	Federal (20780)		
Boat Bluff Lighthouse	Southern tip of Sarah Island; Regional District of Kitimat-Stikine BC	52°38′35″N 128°31′27″W	Federal (20776)		
Meziadin Fish Ladder	Meziadin River near its mouth at the Nass River; Regional District of Kitimat-Stikine BC	56°01′20″N 129°09′11″W	Federal (19436)		Upload Photo
Simon Gunanoot Gravesite	Graveyard Point, Bowser Lake; Regional District of Kitimat-Stikine BC	56°25′55″N 129°32′08″W	Federal (19434)		Upload Photo
Egg Island Lighthouse	Egg Island, off the coast at the northeast entrance to the Queen Charlotte Strait; Central Coast Regional District BC	51°14′59″N 127°50′11″W	Federal (20781)		
Langara Point Lighthouse	Langara Point; Langara Island BC	54°15′19″N 133°03′34″W	Federal (9496, (21113)		Upload Photo
McInnes Island Lighthouse	McInnes Island, off the southern tip of Price Island; McInnes Island BC	52°15′44″N 128°43′18″W	Federal (20798)		Upload Photo
Green Island Lighthouse	Green Island, east of Dundas Island in Chatham Sound; Skeena-Queen Charlotte A BC	54°34′07″N 130°42′31″W	Federal (20796)		Upload Photo
Capilano Shipwreck	Strait of Georgia south of Savary Island; Powell River Regional District BC	49°52′47″N 124°46′15″W	British Columbia (10311)		Upload Photo
North Pacific Cannery National Historic Site of Canada	Port Edward; Skeena-Queen Charlotte BC	54°11′41″N 130°13′26″W	Federal (12321)		
Pacific Roundhouse	35km by rail north of Terrace; Pacific BC	54°46′13″N 128°16′15″W	Federal (20270)		Upload Photo
Yukon Telegraph Trail	500km of former telegraph line route in Kitimat-Stikine Regional District; Telegraph Creek BC	57°55′14″N 131°10′07″W	Telegraph Creek municipality (17944)		Upload Photo
Triple Island Lighthouse National Historic Site of Canada	Prince Rupert; Skeena-Queen Charlotte BC	54°17′41″N 130°52′48″W	Federal (12770, (11407), British Columbia (20835)		
Butedale Cannery	Butedale; Kitimat-Stikine BC	53°09′36″N 128°41′49″W	Kitimat-Stikine municipality (14603)		
Old Skeena Bridge	3100 Old Highway 16, Terrace; Kitimat-Stikine BC	54°30′54″N 128°33′40″W	Kitimat-Stikine municipality (14604)		
Hagwilget Bridge	Highway 62, near Hazelton; Kitimat-Stikine BC	55°15′26″N 127°36′18″W	Kitimat-Stikine municipality (14605)		
Anyox Powerhouse No. 1	Anyox; Kitimat-Stikine BC	55°24′59″N 129°49′41″W	Kitimat-Stikine municipality (14606)		Upload Photo
First Crossing of North America National Historic Site of Canada	Bella Coola; Central Coast Regional District BC	52°22′27″N 126°46′23″W	Federal (14662)		
Merry Island Lighthouse	Eastern tip of Merry Island; Sunrise Beach BC	49°28′03″N 123°54′44″W	Federal (20799)		Upload Photo
George Little House	3100 Kalum Street, Terrace; Kitimat-Stikine BC	54°30′53″N 128°35′13″W	Kitimat-Stikine municipality (15923)		Upload Photo
Great War Veterans' Association Hall	4552 Lakelse Avenue; Terrace BC	54°30′59″N 128°35′09″W	Terrace municipality (21053)		Upload Photo
Kitsumgallum Pioneer Cemetery	101 Kalum Lake Drive; Terrace BC	54°31′18″N 128°38′14″W	Terrace municipality (21055)		Upload Photo
Terrace Heritage Park Museum	4702 Kerby Avenue; Terrace BC	54°32′04″N 128°35′32″W	Terrace municipality (21054)		Upload Photo
British Columbia Provincial Police Station	3224 Kalum Street, Terrace; Kitimat-Stikine BC	54°31′00″N 128°35′10″W	Kitimat-Stikine municipality (16164)		Upload Photo
Kwinitsa Railway Foreman's Residence	4805 Highway 16 West, Terrace; Kitimat-Stikine BC	54°30′56″N 128°36′00″W	Kitimat-Stikine municipality (16185)		Upload Photo
Telegraph Creek	Telegraph Creek; Kitimat-Stikine BC	57°54′06″N 131°09′54″W	Kitimat-Stikine municipality (17922)		Upload Photo
