= List of historic places in the Central Okanagan Regional District =

The following list includes all of the Canadian Register of Historic Places listings in Central Okanagan Regional District, British Columbia.

Name	Address	Coordinates	Government recognition (CRHP №)	Wikidata ID	Image
Myra Canyon Section of the Kettle Valley Railway National Historic Site of Canada	Myra Canyon; Central Okanagan BC	49°47′06″N 119°18′36″W	Federal (9349)		More images
1475 Richter Street	1475 Richter Street; Kelowna BC	49°53′14″N 119°29′17″W	Kelowna municipality (11685)		Upload Photo
1481 Richter Street	1481 Richter Street; Kelowna BC	49°53′13″N 119°29′17″W	Kelowna municipality (11686)		Upload Photo
1560 Water Street	1560 Water Street; Kelowna BC	49°53′09″N 119°29′49″W	Kelowna municipality (11580)		Upload Photo
1570 Water Street	1570 Water Street; Kelowna BC	49°53′08″N 119°29′49″W	Kelowna municipality (11581)		Upload Photo
1730 Ethel Street	1730 Ethel Street; Kelowna BC	49°52′58″N 119°28′59″W	Kelowna municipality (11605)		Upload Photo
McGregor House	1788 Ethel Street; Kelowna BC	49°52′55″N 119°28′58″W	Kelowna municipality (11606)		Upload Photo
G. Davis House	1927 Ethel Street; Kelowna BC	49°52′45″N 119°28′58″W	Kelowna municipality (11607)		Upload Photo
1812 Marshall Street	1812 Marshall Street; Kelowna BC	49°52′54″N 119°29′35″W	Kelowna municipality (11507)		Upload Photo
2083 Abbott Street	2083 Abbott Street; Kelowna BC	49°52′36″N 119°29′46″W	Kelowna municipality (11584)		Upload Photo
2127 Pandosy Street	2127 Pandosy Street; Kelowna BC	49°52′33″N 119°29′28″W	Kelowna municipality (11670)		Upload Photo
2319 Pandosy Street	2319 Pandosy Street; Kelowna BC	49°52′20″N 119°29′28″W	Kelowna municipality (11671)		Upload Photo
732 Sutherland Avenue	732 Sutherland Avenue; Kelowna BC	49°52′48″N 119°29′17″W	Kelowna municipality (11703)		Upload Photo
770 Bernard Avenue	770 Bernard Avenue; Kelowna BC	49°53′12″N 119°29′13″W	Kelowna municipality (6971)		Upload Photo
792 Lawrence Avenue	792 Lawrence Avenue; Kelowna BC	49°53′08″N 119°29′10″W	Kelowna municipality (11641)		Upload Photo
795 Bernard Avenue	795 Bernard Avenue; Kelowna BC	49°53′10″N 119°29′10″W	Kelowna municipality (11587)		Upload Photo
825 Lawrence Avenue	825 Lawrence Avenue; Kelowna BC	49°53′06″N 119°29′06″W	Kelowna municipality (11644)		
A. McKim House	855 Bernard Avenue; Kelowna BC	49°53′10″N 119°29′02″W	Kelowna municipality (11590)		Upload Photo
Adams House	1998 Abbott Street; Kelowna BC	49°52′40″N 119°29′53″W	Kelowna municipality (7160)		Upload Photo
Annie Stirling House	2178 Pandosy Street; Kelowna BC	49°52′29″N 119°29′31″W	Kelowna municipality (6991)		Upload Photo
Atchison House	831 Lawrence Avenue; Kelowna BC	49°53′06″N 119°29′06″W	Kelowna municipality (11645)		
B.C. Tree Fruits Ltd.	1473 Water Street; Kelowna BC	49°53′13″N 119°29′46″W	Kelowna municipality (11575)		Upload Photo
Barton House	409 Cadder Avenue; Kelowna BC	49°52′34″N 119°29′38″W	Kelowna municipality (7194)		Upload Photo
BC Growers Packing House	1304 Ellis Street; Kelowna BC	49°53′29″N 119°29′38″W	Kelowna municipality (3332)		More images
Belgo House	1590-1640 Belgo Road; Kelowna BC	49°51′57″N 119°22′41″W	Kelowna municipality (7165)		Upload Photo
Benvoulin Church	2279 Benvoulin Road; Kelowna BC	49°52′21″N 119°26′31″W	Kelowna municipality (3321)		Upload Photo
Black Mountain School	2040 Joe Riche Road; Kelowna BC	49°52′02″N 119°20′46″W	Kelowna municipality (7142)		Upload Photo
Blackey House	315 Cadder Avenue; Kelowna BC	49°52′34″N 119°29′46″W	Kelowna municipality (7192)		Upload Photo
Bouvette House	2079 Pandosy Street; Kelowna BC	49°52′36″N 119°29′28″W	Kelowna municipality (11550)		Upload Photo
Brent's Grist Mill	2128 Leckie Place; Kelowna BC	49°53′13″N 119°26′20″W	Kelowna municipality (11543)		Upload Photo
Brigadier Angle Armoury	720 Lawrence Avenue; Kelowna BC	49°53′08″N 119°29′17″W	Federal (9510)		Upload Photo
Bright House	3430 Pooley Road; Kelowna BC	49°51′46″N 119°24′18″W	Kelowna municipality (11672)		Upload Photo
Brookdale	3430 Benvoulin Road; Kelowna BC	49°51′26″N 119°27′47″W	Kelowna municipality (6970)		Upload Photo
Buck House	469 Park Avenue; Kelowna BC	49°52′40″N 119°29′31″W	Kelowna municipality (11567)		Upload Photo
Burnham House	1826 Marshall Street; Kelowna BC	49°52′52″N 119°29′35″W	Kelowna municipality (11546)		Upload Photo
Byron McDonald House	1471 Richter Street; Kelowna BC	49°53′14″N 119°29′17″W	Kelowna municipality (11683)		Upload Photo
C. Martin House	1441 Richter Street; Kelowna BC	49°53′17″N 119°29′17″W	Kelowna municipality (11674)		Upload Photo
C.B. Ghezzi House	2089 Pandosy Street; Kelowna BC	49°52′35″N 119°29′28″W	Kelowna municipality (11669)		Upload Photo
Cadder House	2124 Pandosy Street; Kelowna BC	49°52′33″N 119°29′31″W	Kelowna municipality (3373)		Upload Photo
Cameron House	2337-2345 Richter Street; Kelowna BC	49°52′18″N 119°29′13″W	Kelowna municipality (11873)		Upload Photo
Capozzi House	1842 Abbott Street; Kelowna BC	49°52′55″N 119°30′00″W	Kelowna municipality (6994)		Upload Photo
Casorso Block	425-437 Bernard Avenue; Kelowna BC	49°53′10″N 119°29′42″W	Kelowna municipality (7189)		Upload Photo
Central Elementary School	1825 Richter Street; Kelowna BC	49°52′52″N 119°29′13″W	Kelowna municipality (3333)		Upload Photo
Charles Clement House	1049 Borden Avenue; Kelowna BC	49°52′51″N 119°28′44″W	Kelowna municipality (11595)		Upload Photo
Charles Harvey House	715 Sutherland Avenue; Kelowna BC	49°52′46″N 119°29′17″W	Kelowna municipality (11573)		Upload Photo
Clement Barn	1019 Borden Avenue; Kelowna BC	49°52′51″N 119°28′44″W	Kelowna municipality (11594)		Upload Photo
CN Station	520 Clement Avenue; Kelowna BC	49°53′38″N 119°29′35″W	Federal (6632), Kelowna municipality (3372)		
Collett House	2189 Pandosy Street; Kelowna BC	49°52′29″N 119°29′28″W	Kelowna municipality (11551)		Upload Photo
Cookson House	1912 Abbott Street; Kelowna BC	49°52′48″N 119°29′56″W	Kelowna municipality (6995)		Upload Photo
Reid House	3285 Reid Road; Kelowna BC	49°51′47″N 119°23′54″W	Kelowna municipality (11569)		Upload Photo
Copeland House	784 Elliot Avenue; Kelowna BC	49°52′45″N 119°29′10″W	Kelowna municipality (11604)		Upload Photo
Courier Building	1580 Water Street; Kelowna BC	49°53′08″N 119°29′49″W	Kelowna municipality (11582)		Upload Photo
Cross House	3652 Spiers Road; Kelowna BC	49°51′04″N 119°26′30″W	Kelowna municipality (11701)		Upload Photo
Cummings House	334 Beach Avenue; Kelowna BC	49°52′45″N 119°29′46″W	Kelowna municipality (11585)		Upload Photo
Davies House	1537 Lakeview Street; Kelowna BC	49°53′09″N 119°28′01″W	Kelowna municipality (7211)		Upload Photo
Brown House	1826 Maple Street; Kelowna BC	49°52′55″N 119°29′53″W	Kelowna municipality (7227)		Upload Photo
Dawson-Monteith House	1842 Maple Street; Kelowna BC	49°52′54″N 119°29′53″W	Kelowna municipality (7228)		Upload Photo
Dr. Keller House	2005 Pandosy Street; Kelowna BC	49°52′42″N 119°29′28″W	Kelowna municipality (11668)		Upload Photo
Dr. Shepherd House	2034 Pandosy Street; Kelowna BC	49°52′38″N 119°29′31″W	Kelowna municipality (6990)		Upload Photo
Dudgeon Farm House	250 Leathead Road; Kelowna BC	49°53′45″N 119°23′24″W	Kelowna municipality (7225)		Upload Photo
Dunn House	2024 Pandosy Street; Kelowna BC	49°52′39″N 119°29′31″W	Kelowna municipality (11549)		Upload Photo
E.D. Alexander House	768 DeHart Avenue; Kelowna BC	49°52′55″N 119°29′13″W	Kelowna municipality (11601)		Upload Photo
East Kelowna Community Hall	2704 East Kelowna Road; Kelowna BC	49°51′36″N 119°25′26″W	Kelowna municipality (7200)		Upload Photo
Empress Theatre	285-287 Bernard Avenue; Kelowna BC	49°53′10″N 119°29′49″W	Kelowna municipality (7183)		Upload Photo
Ernest Clement House	1150 Richter Street; Kelowna BC	49°53′40″N 119°29′20″W	Kelowna municipality (11872)		
F.W. Groves House	409 Park Avenue; Kelowna BC	49°52′40″N 119°29′38″W	Kelowna municipality (11565)		Upload Photo
Fintry Haybarn-Granary	Near Kelowna BC	50°08′14″N 119°30′14″W	British Columbia (18070)		Upload Photo
Fintry Manor House	Near Kelowna BC	50°08′30″N 119°29′56″W	British Columbia (18068)		Upload Photo
Fintry Octagonal Dairy Barn	Near Kelowna BC	50°08′14″N 119°30′14″W	British Columbia (18069)		Upload Photo
Fintry Packinghouse	Near Kelowna BC	50°08′19″N 119°29′31″W	British Columbia (18043)		Upload Photo
First G.D. Loane House	1866 Riverside Avenue; Kelowna BC	49°52′53″N 119°30′00″W	Kelowna municipality (7215)		Upload Photo
First Mallam House	4845 Lakeshore Road; Kelowna BC	49°48′23″N 119°30′11″W	Kelowna municipality (7141)		Upload Photo
Foster Block	235-243 Bernard Avenue; Kelowna BC	49°53′10″N 119°29′53″W	Kelowna municipality (7169)		Upload Photo
Fumerton House	1922 Abbott Street; Kelowna BC	49°52′48″N 119°29′56″W	Kelowna municipality (6996)		Upload Photo
G.H. Kerr House	190 Vimy Avenue; Kelowna BC	49°52′46″N 119°30′00″W	Kelowna municipality (11574)		Upload Photo
G.H. Tutt House	809 DeHart Avenue; Kelowna BC	49°52′53″N 119°29′06″W	Kelowna municipality (11603)		Upload Photo
G.L. Dore House	379 Park Avenue; Kelowna BC	49°52′40″N 119°29′42″W	Kelowna municipality (11564)		Upload Photo
Gaddes House	1857 Maple Street; Kelowna BC	49°52′53″N 119°29′53″W	Kelowna municipality (7229)		Upload Photo
George Ritchie House	845 Lawrence Avenue; Kelowna BC	49°53′06″N 119°29′02″W	Kelowna municipality (7223)		Upload Photo
George Ward Packing House	2287 Ward Road; Kelowna BC	49°50′41″N 119°26′20″W	Kelowna municipality (12031)		Upload Photo
Greenwood House	1815 Maple Street; Kelowna BC	49°52′56″N 119°29′53″W	Kelowna municipality (7226)		Upload Photo
Guisachan House	1060 Cameron Avenue; Kelowna BC	49°52′13″N 119°28′38″W	Kelowna municipality (19166)		Upload Photo
H.C. Cooper House	862 Bernard Avenue; Kelowna BC	49°53′12″N 119°29′02″W	Kelowna municipality (6989)		
H.D. Riggs House	911 Borden Avenue; Kelowna BC	49°52′52″N 119°28′55″W	Kelowna municipality (7190)		Upload Photo
Haldane House	263 Lake Avenue; Kelowna BC	49°52′49″N 119°29′53″W	Kelowna municipality (7210)		Upload Photo
Hamilton House	2136 Abbott Street; Kelowna BC	49°52′33″N 119°29′49″W	Kelowna municipality (7163)		Upload Photo
Hughes-Games House	2094 Abbott Street; Kelowna BC	49°52′36″N 119°29′49″W	Kelowna municipality (6969)		Upload Photo
Hughes-Games House	870 Bernard Avenue; Kelowna BC	49°53′11″N 119°29′01″W	Kelowna municipality (11591)		
Ireland Farm House	1858 Highland Drive North; Kelowna BC	49°53′41″N 119°27′18″W	Kelowna municipality (11608)		Upload Photo
J.B. Whitehead House	545 Burne Avenue; Kelowna BC	49°52′37″N 119°29′28″W	Kelowna municipality (11596)		Upload Photo
J.L. Doyle House	795 Lawrence Avenue; Kelowna BC	49°53′06″N 119°29′10″W	Kelowna municipality (11642)		Upload Photo
J.N. Thompson House	1875 Richter Street; Kelowna BC	49°52′49″N 119°29′17″W	Kelowna municipality (11570)		Upload Photo
J.W. Hughes House	806 Bernard Avenue; Kelowna BC	49°53′12″N 119°29′10″W	Kelowna municipality (7144)		Upload Photo
J.W. Jones House	830 Bernard Avenue; Kelowna BC	49°53′12″N 119°29′06″W	Kelowna municipality (6972)		Upload Photo
Jackson House	236 Beach Avenue; Kelowna BC	49°52′44″N 119°29′56″W	Kelowna municipality (7164)		Upload Photo
Jennens House	1978 McDougall Street; Kelowna BC	49°52′44″N 119°29′56″W	Kelowna municipality (11548)		Upload Photo
John F. Burne House	609 Burne Avenue; Kelowna BC	49°52′37″N 119°29′24″W	Kelowna municipality (7143)		Upload Photo
Kelowna Fire Hall	1616 Water Street; Kelowna BC	49°53′06″N 119°29′49″W	Kelowna municipality (3371)		Upload Photo
Knowles Jewellers	369-371 Bernard Avenue; Kelowna BC	49°53′10″N 119°29′42″W	Kelowna municipality (7187)		Upload Photo
KLO House	2796 KLO Road; Kelowna BC	49°51′34″N 119°25′42″W	Kelowna municipality (11624)		Upload Photo
L.E. Taylor House	1551 Lambert Avenue; Kelowna BC	49°53′42″N 119°27′50″W	Kelowna municipality (11625)		Upload Photo
Second Knowles House	1001 Lawrence Avenue; Kelowna BC	49°53′07″N 119°28′47″W	Kelowna municipality (11626)		Upload Photo
Leathley Printing Building	1481 Water Street; Kelowna BC	49°53′12″N 119°29′46″W	Kelowna municipality (11579)		Upload Photo
Leckie Block	267-271 Bernard Avenue; Kelowna BC	49°53′10″N 119°29′53″W	Kelowna municipality (7171)		Upload Photo
Old Post Office	274 Bernard Avenue; Kelowna BC	49°53′10″N 119°29′49″W	Kelowna municipality (11544)		Upload Photo
Leckie House	781 Bernard Avenue; Kelowna BC	49°53′10″N 119°29′10″W	Kelowna municipality (7145)		
Leopold Hayes House	329 Cadder Avenue; Kelowna BC	49°52′34″N 119°29′46″W	Kelowna municipality (7193)		Upload Photo
Lequime's Store	229-233 Bernard Avenue; Kelowna BC	49°53′10″N 119°29′56″W	Kelowna municipality (7168)		Upload Photo
Lewis House	255 Lake Avenue; Kelowna BC	49°52′49″N 119°29′56″W	Kelowna municipality (7209)		Upload Photo
Logie House	344 Park Avenue; Kelowna BC	49°52′42″N 119°29′46″W	Kelowna municipality (11552)		Upload Photo
MacLean House	1869 Maple Street; Kelowna BC	49°52′53″N 119°29′53″W	Kelowna municipality (7230)		Upload Photo
McDonald Farm House	520 Rutland Road; Kelowna BC	49°53′42″N 119°23′13″W	Kelowna municipality (11700)		Upload Photo
McEachern Tobacco Barn	3139 Benvoulin Road; Kelowna BC	49°51′32″N 119°27′25″W	Kelowna municipality (7167)		Upload Photo
McIvor House	2269-2279 Benvoulin Road; Kelowna BC	49°52′23″N 119°26′31″W	Kelowna municipality (7166)		Upload Photo
McWilliams House	2072 Abbott Street; Kelowna BC	49°52′36″N 119°29′49″W	Kelowna municipality (7161)		Upload Photo
Meikle House	757 Lawrence Avenue; Kelowna BC	49°53′06″N 119°29′13″W	Kelowna municipality (7222)		
Meugens House	450 Cadder Avenue; Kelowna BC	49°52′36″N 119°29′35″W	Kelowna municipality (7195)		Upload Photo
Morrison Block	353 Bernard Avenue; Kelowna BC	49°53′10″N 119°29′46″W	Kelowna municipality (7186)		Upload Photo
Muirhead House	763 Bernard Avenue; Kelowna BC	49°53′10″N 119°29′13″W	Kelowna municipality (11586)		Upload Photo
Murchison House	1781 Abbott Street; Kelowna BC	49°52′58″N 119°29′56″W	Kelowna municipality (6992)		Upload Photo
Murdoch House	1957 Abbott Street; Kelowna BC	49°52′45″N 119°29′53″W	Kelowna municipality (6998)		Upload Photo
N.D. McTavish House	710 Sutherland Avenue; Kelowna BC	49°52′48″N 119°29′17″W	Kelowna municipality (11702)		Upload Photo
OK Loan & Investment	280 Bernard Avenue; Kelowna BC	49°53′12″N 119°29′49″W	Kelowna municipality (7182)		Upload Photo
Okanagan Mission Community Hall	4409 Lakeshore Road; Kelowna BC	49°49′21″N 119°29′17″W	Kelowna municipality (7137)		Upload Photo
Old Glenn Avenue School	1633 Richter Street; Kelowna BC	49°53′06″N 119°29′17″W	Kelowna municipality (7159)		
Old Royal Bank	262 Bernard Avenue; Kelowna BC	49°53′12″N 119°29′53″W	Kelowna municipality (7170)		Upload Photo
Dougald McDougall House	857 Lawrence Avenue; Kelowna BC	49°53′07″N 119°29′02″W	Kelowna municipality (11646)		Upload Photo
Old United Church Manse	963 Lawrence Avenue; Kelowna BC	49°53′06″N 119°28′52″W	Kelowna municipality (11647)		Upload Photo
P.B. Willits House	432 Christleton Avenue; Kelowna BC	49°52′19″N 119°29′35″W	Kelowna municipality (7199)		Upload Photo
P.E. Simpson House	758 Sutherland Avenue; Kelowna BC	49°52′48″N 119°29′13″W	Kelowna municipality (11704)		Upload Photo
Pandosy Mission	3685 Benvoulin Road; Kelowna BC	49°51′00″N 119°28′01″W	British Columbia (3331)		Upload Photo
Pettman House	228 Lake Avenue; Kelowna BC	49°52′51″N 119°29′53″W	Kelowna municipality (7208)		Upload Photo
Pooley House	3690 Pooley Road; Kelowna BC	49°51′33″N 119°24′04″W	Kelowna municipality (11568)		Upload Photo
Raymer Block	289-299 Bernard Avenue; Kelowna BC	49°53′10″N 119°29′49″W	Kelowna municipality (7184)		Upload Photo
Raymer House	730 Lawson Avenue; Kelowna BC	49°53′15″N 119°29′17″W	Kelowna municipality (7224)		Upload Photo
Reekie House	429 Park Avenue; Kelowna BC	49°52′40″N 119°29′38″W	Kelowna municipality (11566)		Upload Photo
Renfrew House	504 Keith Road; Kelowna BC	49°49′10″N 119°29′46″W	Kelowna municipality (11613)		Upload Photo
Robert Munson House	966 Lawrence Avenue; Kelowna BC	49°53′08″N 119°28′52″W	Kelowna municipality (11648)		Upload Photo
Renwick House	987 Lawrence Avenue; Kelowna BC	49°53′07″N 119°28′49″W	Kelowna municipality (11649)		Upload Photo
Rowcliffe Block	272 Bernard Avenue; Kelowna BC	49°53′12″N 119°29′49″W	Kelowna municipality (7172)		Upload Photo
Rutland Elementary School	770 Rutland Road; Kelowna BC	49°53′56″N 119°23′17″W	Kelowna municipality (7158)		Upload Photo
Ryan House	1812 Riverside Avenue; Kelowna BC	49°52′57″N 119°30′00″W	Kelowna municipality (7214)		Upload Photo
Second Casorso House	3877 Casorso Road; Kelowna BC	49°50′37″N 119°27′36″W	Kelowna municipality (7198)		Upload Photo
Second G.D. Loane House	1858 Abbott Street; Kelowna BC	49°52′53″N 119°30′00″W	Kelowna municipality (6968)		Upload Photo
Second Mallam House	4852-4856 Lakeshore Road; Kelowna BC	49°48′28″N 119°30′25″W	Kelowna municipality (7140)		Upload Photo
Simpson House	2120 Abbott Street; Kelowna BC	49°52′33″N 119°29′49″W	Kelowna municipality (7162)		Upload Photo
Sproul Farm House	180 Highway 33 East; Kelowna BC	49°53′21″N 119°23′06″W	Kelowna municipality (11609)		Upload Photo
St. Andrew's Church	4619 Lakeshore Road; Kelowna BC	49°49′02″N 119°29′38″W	Kelowna municipality (7138)		
St. Mary's Anglican Church	2710 East Kelowna Road; Kelowna BC	49°51′37″N 119°25′26″W	Kelowna municipality (7201)		Upload Photo
St. Michael's Anglican Cathedral	608 Sutherland Avenue, Kelowna BC	49°52′49″N 119°29′24″W	Kelowna municipality (11572)		Upload Photo
Stiell House	273 Burne Avenue; Kelowna BC	49°52′38″N 119°29′53″W	Kelowna municipality (7191)		Upload Photo
Stone House	1806 Abbott Street; Kelowna BC	49°52′58″N 119°30′00″W	Kelowna municipality (6993)		Upload Photo
Stubbs House	999 Crawford Road; Kelowna BC	49°49′25″N 119°28′23″W	Kelowna municipality (7136)		Upload Photo
Sutherland Store	339-347 Bernard Avenue; Kelowna BC	49°53′10″N 119°29′46″W	Kelowna municipality (7185)		Upload Photo
T. Treadgold House	1931 Abbott Street; Kelowna BC	49°52′48″N 119°29′53″W	Kelowna municipality (11583)		Upload Photo
T.E. Handlen House	780 DeHart Avenue; Kelowna BC	49°52′55″N 119°29′10″W	Kelowna municipality (11602)		Upload Photo
Temple House	356 Park Avenue; Kelowna BC	49°52′42″N 119°29′42″W	Kelowna municipality (11563)		Upload Photo
The Old Cannery	1250-1298 Ellis Street; Kelowna BC	49°53′33″N 119°29′38″W	Kelowna municipality (11545)		
Third Casorso House	3860 Casorso Road; Kelowna BC	49°50′33″N 119°27′40″W	Kelowna municipality (7197)		Upload Photo
Third John McDougall House	1056-1060 Cameron Avenue; Kelowna BC	49°52′13″N 119°28′37″W	Kelowna municipality (7196)		Upload Photo
W.A.C. Bennett House	1988 Bowes Street; Kelowna BC	49°52′42″N 119°28′48″W	Kelowna municipality (3370)		Upload Photo
W.D. Walker House	4464 Lakeshore Road; Kelowna BC	49°49′18″N 119°29′28″W	Kelowna municipality (11614)		Upload Photo
Harding House	1807 Marshall Street; Kelowna BC	49°52′54″N 119°29′35″W	Kelowna municipality (7231)		Upload Photo
W.J. Marshall House	1869 Marshall Street; Kelowna BC	49°52′50″N 119°29′35″W	Kelowna municipality (11547)		Upload Photo
W.R. Foster House	486 Cadder Avenue; Kelowna BC	49°52′36″N 119°29′31″W	Kelowna municipality (7146)		Upload Photo
W.R. Trench House	784 Lawrence Avenue; Kelowna BC	49°53′08″N 119°29′10″W	Kelowna municipality (11639)		Upload Photo
W.T. Small House	863 Coronado Crescent; Kelowna BC	49°49′00″N 119°28′34″W	Kelowna municipality (7139)		Upload Photo
Wartime Housing Type #1	567 Okanagan Boulevard; Kelowna BC	49°54′03″N 119°29′30″W	Kelowna municipality (11654)		Upload Photo
Wartime Housing Type #2	507 Oxford Avenue; Kelowna BC	49°54′06″N 119°29′35″W	Kelowna municipality (11656)		Upload Photo
Wartime Housing Type #3	574 Okanagan Boulevard; Kelowna BC	49°54′04″N 119°29′31″W	Kelowna municipality (11655)		Upload Photo
Wasson House	434 Royal Avenue; Kelowna BC	49°52′29″N 119°29′35″W	Kelowna municipality (11571)		Upload Photo
William Harvey House	796 Bernard Avenue; Kelowna BC	49°53′12″N 119°29′10″W	Kelowna municipality (11588)		
William McDougall House	124 McTavish Avenue; Kelowna BC	49°52′49″N 119°30′07″W	Kelowna municipality (7213)		Upload Photo
Willis Schell House	1024 Rutland Road; Kelowna BC	49°54′07″N 119°23′13″W	Kelowna municipality (11688)		Upload Photo
Willits-Taylor Drug Store	375-387 Bernard Avenue; Kelowna BC	49°53′10″N 119°29′42″W	Kelowna municipality (7188)		Upload Photo
Winter House	815 Bernard Avenue; Kelowna BC	49°53′10″N 119°29′06″W	Kelowna municipality (11589)		
Women's Institute Hall	770 Lawrence Avenue; Kelowna BC	49°53′08″N 119°29′13″W	Kelowna municipality (11638)		
