= List of historic places in Greater Vancouver North Shore =

The following list includes all of the Canadian Register of Historic Places listings in North Shore, British Columbia, including:

- North Shore Mountains,
- North Vancouver City,
- North Vancouver District Municipality, and
- West Vancouver District Municipality.

Name	Address	Coordinates	Government recognition (CRHP №)	Wikidata ID	Image
214 West 6th Street	214 West 6th Street; North Vancouver BC	49°19′04″N 123°04′41″W	North Vancouver municipality (2435)		More images
240 East 10th Street Residence	240 East 10th Street; North Vancouver BC	49°19′02″N 123°04′01″W	North Vancouver municipality (6208)		More images
254 Keith Road East Residence	254 Keith Road East; North Vancouver BC	49°18′54″N 123°04′05″W	North Vancouver municipality (6197)		More images
256 East 10th Street Residence	256 East 10th Street; North Vancouver BC	49°19′02″N 123°04′01″W	North Vancouver municipality (6325)		Upload Photo
268 West 6th Street	268 West 6th Street; North Vancouver City BC	49°19′07″N 123°04′48″W	North Vancouver City municipality (3819)		More images
832 Cumberland Crescent	832 Cumberland Crescent; North Vancouver City BC	49°19′34″N 123°05′46″W	North Vancouver City municipality (3812)		Upload Photo
842 Cumberland Crescent	842 Cumberland Cresecent; North Vancouver City BC	49°19′34″N 123°05′46″W	North Vancouver City municipality (3811)		Upload Photo
852 Cumberland Crescent	852 Cumberland Crescent; North Vancouver City BC	49°19′34″N 123°05′46″W	North Vancouver City municipality (3810)		Upload Photo
862 Cumberland Crescent	862 Cumberland Crescent; North Vancouver City BC	49°19′34″N 123°05′49″W	North Vancouver City municipality (3809)		Upload Photo
872 Cumberland Crescent	872 Cumberland Crescent; North Vancouver City BC	49°19′34″N 123°05′49″W	North Vancouver City municipality (3808)		Upload Photo
Aberdeen Block	90 Lonsdale Avenue; North Vancouver BC	49°18′43″N 123°04′41″W	North Vancouver municipality (2403)		More images
Administration Building	131 East 2nd Street; North Vancouver BC	49°18′44″N 123°04′37″W	North Vancouver municipality (2402)		More images
Archibald Residence	227 East 10th Street; North Vancouver BC	49°19′00″N 123°04′05″W	North Vancouver municipality (2480)		More images
Armoury	West 15th Street at Forbes Avenue; North Vancouver BC	49°19′20″N 123°05′06″W	Federal (3608)		Upload Photo
B.C. Telephone Building	117 West 1st Street; North Vancouver BC	49°18′43″N 123°04′44″W	North Vancouver municipality (2410)		More images
Baker Residence	650 Keith Road West; North Vancouver BC	49°19′13″N 123°05′24″W	North Vancouver municipality (2442)		Upload Photo
Bank of Hamilton Chambers	92 Lonsdale Avenue; North Vancouver BC	49°18′42″N 123°04′41″W	North Vancouver municipality (2408)		More images
Beasley Block	101 Lonsdale Avenue; North Vancouver BC	49°18′43″N 123°04′44″W	North Vancouver municipality (2407)		More images
Binning Residence National Historic Site of Canada	2968 Mathers Crescent; West Vancouver BC	49°20′25″N 123°11′49″W	Federal (11968)		Upload Photo
Bow Residence	320 Tempe Crescent; North Vancouver BC	49°20′07″N 123°03′54″W	North Vancouver municipality (2400)		Upload Photo
Brown Residence	238 East 11th Street; North Vancouver BC	49°19′04″N 123°04′05″W	North Vancouver municipality (2485)		Upload Photo
Burrard Dry Dock Company	109 East Esplanade; North Vancouver BC	49°18′30″N 123°04′44″W	North Vancouver municipality (2443)		More images
Captain Archibald Residence	2735 Lonsdale Avenue; North Vancouver BC	49°20′05″N 123°04′19″W	North Vancouver municipality (2399)		Upload Photo
Central School	333 Chesterfield Avenue; North Vancouver BC	49°18′55″N 123°04′47″W	North Vancouver municipality (2436)		Upload Photo
Chubb Residence	345 East 9th Street; North Vancouver City BC	49°18′55″N 123°03′50″W	North Vancouver City municipality (3830)		More images
Church of St. John the Evangelist	333 Chesterfield Avenue; North Vancouver BC	49°18′55″N 123°04′52″W	North Vancouver municipality (2440)		More images
Clapham Residence	736 East 3rd Street; North Vancouver BC	49°18′32″N 123°03′32″W	North Vancouver municipality (6328)		More images
Colonial Apartments	160 East 10th Street; North Vancouver BC	49°19′01″N 123°04′12″W	North Vancouver municipality (2439)		More images
Commercial Block	277 East 8th Street; North Vancouver BC	49°18′54″N 123°04′01″W	North Vancouver municipality (2467)		More images
Coronation Block	105 Esplanade Avenue West; North Vancouver BC	49°18′40″N 123°04′48″W	North Vancouver municipality (2438)		More images
Crease Residence	246 East 10th Street; North Vancouver BC	49°19′02″N 123°04′01″W	North Vancouver municipality (6324)		Upload Photo
Cunliffe Residence	419 East 13th Street; North Vancouver BC	49°19′11″N 123°03′43″W	North Vancouver municipality (6205)		More images
Cunningham Residence	172 East 25th Street; North Vancouver City BC	49°19′57″N 123°04′08″W	North Vancouver City municipality (3806)		Upload Photo
Deptford Residence	426 Keith Road West; North Vancouver BC	49°19′13″N 123°04′59″W	North Vancouver municipality (6203)		More images
Doherty Residence	309 East 12th Street; North Vancouver BC	49°19′07″N 123°03′58″W	North Vancouver municipality (6327)		More images
Doney Residence	745 Grand Boulevard; North Vancouver BC	49°18′49″N 123°03′29″W	North Vancouver municipality (2423)		More images
Drysdale Residence	266 West 6th Street; North Vancouver City BC	49°19′07″N 123°04′48″W	North Vancouver City municipality (3818)		More images
Edington Residence	848 East 6th Street; North Vancouver BC	49°18′42″N 123°03′07″W	North Vancouver municipality (6331)		Upload Photo
Ellis Residence	800 Grand Boulevard; North Vancouver BC	49°18′53″N 123°03′22″W	North Vancouver municipality (2424)		More images
Emery Residence	256 East 1st Street; North Vancouver BC	49°18′36″N 123°04′23″W	North Vancouver municipality (6206)		Upload Photo
Falcioni Residence	168 East 1st Street; North Vancouver City BC	49°18′40″N 123°04′34″W	North Vancouver City municipality (3833)		More images
Fawcett Residence	442 East 2nd Street; North Vancouver BC	49°18′30″N 123°04′01″W	North Vancouver municipality (6333)		Upload Photo
Finlay's Row	200 Block East 19th Street; North Vancouver BC	49°19′33″N 123°04′05″W	North Vancouver municipality (2465)		More images
First Church of Christ Scientist	185 Keith Road; North Vancouver BC	49°18′55″N 123°04′16″W	North Vancouver municipality (2412)		More images
Foster Residence	276 Keith Road East; North Vancouver BC	49°18′53″N 123°04′01″W	North Vancouver municipality (6198)		More images
Gill Residence	1617 Grand Boulevard; North Vancouver BC	49°19′24″N 123°03′29″W	North Vancouver municipality (2415)		More images
Gill Residence	231 East 10th Street; North Vancouver BC	49°19′00″N 123°04′05″W	North Vancouver municipality (2415)		Upload Photo
Gill Residence	736 East 6th Street; North Vancouver BC	49°18′41″N 123°03′20″W	North Vancouver municipality (6332)		Upload Photo
Gladwin Residence	225 East 10th Street; North Vancouver BC	49°19′00″N 123°04′05″W	North Vancouver municipality (2479)		Upload Photo
Grand Boulevard	Grand Boulevard; North Vancouver BC	49°19′11″N 123°03′29″W	North Vancouver municipality (2425)		More images
Grant Residence	278 West 5th Street; North Vancouver BC	49°19′04″N 123°04′52″W	North Vancouver municipality (6330)		More images
H.D. Green-Armytage Residence	116 West 23rd Street; North Vancouver City BC	49°19′50″N 123°04′23″W	North Vancouver City municipality (3807)		More images
Hall Residence	315 East 10th Street; North Vancouver City BC	49°18′59″N 123°03′58″W	North Vancouver City municipality (2418)		More images
Hamersley Gardener's Cottage	364 East 1st Street; North Vancouver BC	49°18′30″N 123°04′12″W	North Vancouver municipality (2406)		Upload Photo
Hamersley House	350 East 2nd Street; North Vancouver BC	49°18′34″N 123°04′12″W	North Vancouver municipality (2484)		Upload Photo
Hansbrough Residence	426 East 10th Street; North Vancouver BC	49°19′02″N 123°03′43″W	North Vancouver municipality (6326)		More images
Harbour Manor	250 East 1st Street; North Vancouver BC	49°18′35″N 123°04′23″W	North Vancouver municipality (2405)		Upload Photo
Harrison Residence	346 East Fifth Street; North Vancouver BC	49°18′42″N 123°04′03″W	North Vancouver municipality (6329)		Upload Photo
Harvie Residence	952 Grand Boulevard; North Vancouver City BC	49°18′59″N 123°03′22″W	North Vancouver City municipality (3829)		More images
Haswell Residence	910 Grand Boulevard; North Vancouver BC	49°18′57″N 123°03′22″W	North Vancouver municipality (2421)		More images
Henderson Residence	405 East 4th Street; North Vancouver BC	49°18′36″N 123°04′01″W	North Vancouver municipality (2478)		Upload Photo
Hoare Residence	387 East 5th Street; North Vancouver City BC	49°18′39″N 123°04′01″W	North Vancouver City municipality (3834)		More images
Howard-Gibbon Residence	262 West 6th Street; North Vancouver City BC	49°19′07″N 123°04′48″W	North Vancouver City municipality (3817)		More images
Huggett Residence	1533 Grand Boulevard; North Vancouver City BC	49°19′21″N 123°03′29″W	North Vancouver City municipality (3814)		More images
Hughes Residence	152 East 3rd Street; North Vancouver City BC	49°18′47″N 123°04′30″W	North Vancouver City municipality (3831)		More images
Humphreys Residence	1500 Grand Boulevard; North Vancouver City BC	49°19′20″N 123°03′22″W	North Vancouver City municipality (3815)		More images
Hutchinson Residence	241 Keith Road East; North Vancouver BC	49°18′53″N 123°04′08″W	North Vancouver municipality (6199)		Upload Photo
Jones Residence, West 16th Street	343 West 16th Street; North Vancouver City BC	49°19′22″N 123°04′48″W	North Vancouver City municipality (3813)		More images
Keith Block	93 Lonsdale Avenue; North Vancouver BC	49°18′43″N 123°04′44″W	North Vancouver municipality (2409)		More images
Keith Residence	750 Grand Boulevard; North Vancouver BC	49°18′49″N 123°03′22″W	North Vancouver municipality (2422)		More images
Keller Residence	524 East 11th Street; North Vancouver City BC	49°19′05″N 123°03′32″W	North Vancouver City municipality (3823)		More images
Kinder Residence	209 West 13th Street; North Vancouver City BC	49°19′11″N 123°04′34″W	North Vancouver City municipality (3835)		
Kitchin Residence	1509 Mahon Avenue; North Vancouver City BC	49°19′21″N 123°04′43″W	North Vancouver City municipality (3838)		Upload Photo
Knowles Residence	328 West 14th Street; North Vancouver BC	49°19′17″N 123°04′48″W	North Vancouver municipality (2463)		More images
Larson Residence	254 West 6th Street; North Vancouver BC	49°19′07″N 123°04′44″W	North Vancouver municipality (2462)		More images
Law Block	123 East 3rd Street; North Vancouver BC	49°18′47″N 123°04′34″W	North Vancouver municipality (2482)		More images
Logan Residence	508-510 St. George's Avenue; North Vancouver BC	49°18′50″N 123°04′19″W	North Vancouver municipality (2401)		More images
Lonsdale School	2151 Lonsdale Avenue; North Vancouver BC	49°19′45″N 123°04′26″W	North Vancouver municipality (2445)		Upload Photo
MacLeod Residence	233 West 6th Street; North Vancouver City BC	49°19′03″N 123°04′44″W	North Vancouver City municipality (3828)		More images
McDowell Residence	1160 Grand Boulevard; North Vancouver City BC	49°19′07″N 123°03′22″W	North Vancouver City municipality (3821)		Upload Photo
McEwen Residence	346 East 8th Street; North Vancouver BC	49°18′54″N 123°03′50″W	North Vancouver municipality (6336)		More images
McNair Residence	288 East 6th Street; North Vancouver BC	49°18′50″N 123°04′08″W	North Vancouver municipality (2483)		More images
Milne Residence	1849 Moody Avenue; North Vancouver BC	49°19′33″N 123°03′36″W	North Vancouver municipality (6200)		More images
Mount Crown Block	109 East 1st Street; North Vancouver BC	49°18′42″N 123°04′41″W	North Vancouver municipality (2404)		More images
Nixon Residence	1234 Ridgeway Avenue; North Vancouver BC	49°19′10″N 123°03′47″W	North Vancouver municipality (6202)		More images
North Vancouver Cartage Company	7A Lonsdale Avenue; North Vancouver BC	49°18′39″N 123°04′48″W	North Vancouver municipality (2444)		Upload Photo
North Vancouver General Hospital	240 East 13th Street; North Vancouver BC	49°19′13″N 123°04′01″W	North Vancouver municipality (2466)		More images
North Vancouver Masonic Temple	1140 Lonsdale Avenue; North Vancouver City BC	49°19′07″N 123°04′19″W	North Vancouver City municipality (3822)		More images
Ottawa Gardens	West 6th Street; North Vancouver BC	49°19′05″N 123°04′44″W	North Vancouver municipality (2427)		More images
Pacific Great Eastern Railway Station	107 Carrie Cates Court; North Vancouver BC	49°18′34″N 123°04′55″W	North Vancouver municipality (2414)		Upload Photo
Paine Residence	217 East Keith Road; North Vancouver City BC	49°19′N 123°04′W	North Vancouver City municipality (3836)		More images
Peers Residence	1450 Jones Avenue; North Vancouver BC	49°19′19″N 123°04′52″W	North Vancouver municipality (6201)		More images
Perry Residence	324 East 10th Street; North Vancouver BC	49°19′02″N 123°03′54″W	North Vancouver municipality (6207)		More images
Point Atkinson Lighthouse National Historic Site of Canada	Burrard Inlet; West Vancouver BC	49°19′52″N 123°15′50″W	Federal (12768, (9677)		More images
Post Office and Federal Building	100 East 1st Street; North Vancouver BC	49°18′43″N 123°04′41″W	North Vancouver municipality (2437)		Upload Photo
Purse Residence	513 East Keith Road; North Vancouver City BC	49°18′47″N 123°03′36″W	North Vancouver City municipality (3837)		More images
Queen Mary School	230 Keith Road West; North Vancouver BC	49°19′09″N 123°04′41″W	North Vancouver municipality (11314)		More images
Ridgeway School	420 East 8th Street; North Vancouver BC	49°18′54″N 123°03′43″W	North Vancouver municipality (2468)		More images
Saint Paul's Roman Catholic Church National Historic Site of Canada	426 Esplanade Street West; North Vancouver BC	49°18′57″N 123°05′17″W	Federal (12683)		More images
Sicot/Burmester Residence	621 West 15th Street; North Vancouver BC	49°19′19″N 123°05′20″W	North Vancouver municipality (6335)		Upload Photo
Sisters of St. Paul School	524 West 6th Street; North Vancouver BC	49°19′10″N 123°05′10″W	North Vancouver municipality (2434)		More images
St. Andrew's United Church	1044 St. George's Avenue; North Vancouver BC	49°19′01″N 123°04′08″W	North Vancouver municipality (2464)		More images
St. Edmund's Church	535 Mahon Avenue; North Vancouver BC	49°19′06″N 123°04′52″W	North Vancouver municipality (2441)		More images
Steacy Residence	557 Lonsdale Avenue; North Vancouver BC	49°18′57″N 123°04′30″W	North Vancouver municipality (2411)		More images
Stephens Residence	234 West 6th Street; North Vancouver BC	49°19′06″N 123°04′44″W	North Vancouver municipality (2433)		More images
Stewart Residence	1105 Grand Boulevard; North Vancouver City BC	49°19′04″N 123°03′29″W	North Vancouver City municipality (3820)		More images
Sutherland Residence	2144 Mahon Avenue; North Vancouver BC	49°19′45″N 123°04′41″W	North Vancouver municipality (6195)		Upload Photo
Syndicate Block	104 West Esplanade; North Vancouver BC	49°18′42″N 123°04′48″W	North Vancouver municipality (6334)		More images
Taylor Residence	1653 Grand Boulevard; North Vancouver BC	49°18′49″N 123°03′29″W	North Vancouver municipality (2419)		Upload Photo
Tesky Residence	244 East 10th Street; North Vancouver BC	49°19′02″N 123°04′01″W	North Vancouver municipality (6322)		Upload Photo
Vance Residence	620 West 15th Street; North Vancouver BC	49°19′21″N 123°05′20″W	North Vancouver municipality (2416)		Upload Photo
Victoria Park	650 Lonsdale Avenue; North Vancouver BC	49°19′01″N 123°04′26″W	North Vancouver municipality (2426)		More images
Wright Residence	146 East 3rd Street; North Vancouver BC	49°18′46″N 123°04′30″W	North Vancouver municipality (6204)		Upload Photo
Wynard and Charlotte Gladwin Residence	260 Keith Road East; North Vancouver BC	49°18′54″N 123°04′05″W	North Vancouver municipality (6196)		More images
Young Residence	1312 Grand Boulevard; North Vancouver BC	49°19′12″N 123°03′23″W	North Vancouver municipality (3816)		Upload Photo
Young Residence	1753 Grand Boulevard; North Vancouver BC	49°19′29″N 123°03′29″W	North Vancouver municipality (2420)		More images
