= List of historic places in the Central Kootenay Regional District =

The following list includes all of the Canadian Register of Historic Places listings in Central Kootenay Regional District, British Columbia.

Name	Address	Coordinates	Government recognition (CRHP №)	Wikidata ID	Image
Doukhobor Suspension Bridge National Historic Site of Canada	Castlegar BC	49°17′27″N 117°38′20″W	Federal (7818)		More images
Pilot Bay Lighthouse	Near Crawford Bay BC	49°38′16″N 116°52′59″W	British Columbia (18041)		Upload Photo
City of Ainsworth Shipwreck Site	Crawford Bay, Kootenay Lake; Gray Creek BC	49°36′08″N 116°48′54″W	British Columbia (19310)		Upload Photo
1896 Building	331 Front Street; Kaslo BC	49°54′42″N 116°54′12″W	Kaslo municipality (19034)		Upload Photo
Kaslo Bay	Kaslo waterfront area Kaslo BC	49°54′54″N 116°54′26″W	Kaslo municipality (19030)		Upload Photo
Kaslo Municipal Hall National Historic Site of Canada	413 Fourth Street; Kaslo BC	49°54′38″N 116°54′18″W	Federal (12065), Kaslo municipality (19024)		
Langham Cultural Centre	447 A Avenue; Kaslo BC	49°54′42″N 116°54′24″W	Kaslo municipality (19033)		
S.S. Moyie National Historic Site of Canada	Kaslo BC	49°54′40″N 116°54′04″W	Federal (12748), Kaslo municipality (19025)		
Sacred Heart Catholic Church	313 Fifth Street; Kaslo BC	49°54′43″N 116°54′24″W	Kaslo municipality (19028)		Upload Photo
St. Andrew's United Church	500 Fourth Street; Kaslo BC	49°54′37″N 116°54′17″W	Kaslo municipality (19029)		
St. Mark's Anglican Church	500 Fourth Street; Kaslo BC	49°54′36″N 116°54′28″W	Kaslo municipality (19027)		Upload Photo
Vimy Park	100 A Avenue; Kaslo BC	49°54′31″N 116°53′55″W	Kaslo municipality (19026)		Upload Photo
212 Broadway Street	212 Broadway Street; Nakusp BC	50°14′19″N 117°48′04″W	Nakusp municipality (18710)		Upload Photo
302 Broadway Street	302 Broadway Street; Nakusp BC	50°14′19″N 117°48′07″W	Nakusp municipality (18706)		Upload Photo
420 Broadway Street	420 Broadway Street; Nakusp BC	50°14′20″N 117°48′14″W	Nakusp municipality (18709)		Upload Photo
83 Broadway Street	83 Broadway Street; Nakusp BC	50°14′19″N 117°47′53″W	Nakusp municipality (18721)		Upload Photo
Bon Marché Store	416 Broadway Street; Nakusp BC	50°14′20″N 117°48′14″W	Nakusp municipality (18592)		Upload Photo
Cowan House	608 Broadway Street; Nakusp BC	50°14′21″N 117°48′22″W	Nakusp municipality (18720)		Upload Photo
Edwards Block	320 Broadway Street; Nakusp BC	50°14′19″N 117°48′11″W	Nakusp municipality (18677)		Upload Photo
Leland Hotel	92 4th Avenue SW; Nakusp BC	50°14′18″N 117°48′11″W	Nakusp municipality (18590)		Upload Photo
Masonic Block	317 Broadway Street; Nakusp BC	50°14′20″N 117°48′09″W	Nakusp municipality (18656)		Upload Photo
Nakusp Courthouse	415 Broadway Street; Nakusp BC	50°14′21″N 117°48′14″W	Nakusp municipality (18603)		
Nakusp Hot Springs	8500 Hot Springs Road; Nakusp BC	50°17′50″N 117°41′17″W	Nakusp municipality (18718)		
Nakusp Legion Hall	94 4th Avenue; Nakusp BC	50°14′23″N 117°48′11″W	Nakusp municipality (18707)		
Nakusp Library and Museum	92 6th Avenue; Nakusp BC	50°14′24″N 117°48′22″W	Nakusp municipality (18657)		
Nakusp Waterfront Walkway	Waterfront Walkway; Nakusp BC	50°14′15″N 117°48′07″W	Nakusp municipality (18741)		More images
Old Presbyterian Church	93 5th Avenue NW; Nakusp BC	50°14′23″N 117°48′11″W	Nakusp municipality (18591)		Upload Photo
Our Lady of Lourdes Catholic Church	96 5th Avenue NW; Nakusp BC	50°14′24″N 117°48′14″W	Nakusp municipality (18736)		Upload Photo
Pine Lodge	119 Broadway Street; Nakusp BC	50°14′20″N 117°48′00″W	Nakusp municipality (18708)		Upload Photo
Spicer's Farm	97 Nelson Ave SW; Nakusp BC	50°14′15″N 117°47′35″W	Nakusp municipality (18740)		Upload Photo
Canadian Pacific Railway Station	90 Baker Street; Nelson BC	49°29′21″N 117°18′05″W	Federal (4562)		
Nikkei Internment Memorial Centre National Historic Site of Canada	306 Josephine Street; New Denver BC	49°59′12″N 117°22′30″W	Federal (15382)		More images
Burlington Northern Railway Station	Railway Avenue (Hwy. #6); Salmo BC	49°11′38″N 117°16′48″W	Federal (9330)		More images
Slocan Mercantile General Store	North bank of Carpenter Creek in ghost town of Sandon; Sandon BC	49°58′33″N 117°13′38″W	British Columbia (21056)		
