= List of historic places in the Thompson-Nicola Regional District =

The following list includes all of the Canadian Register of Historic Places listings in Thompson-Nicola Regional District, British Columbia.

Name	Address	Coordinates	Government recognition (CRHP №)	Wikidata ID	Image
McAbee Fossil Beds Heritage Site	Highway 97; Near Cache Creek BC	50°47′50″N 121°08′28″W	British Columbia (19023)		
Clinton Pioneer Cemetery	7456 Old Clinton Cemetery Road; Clinton BC	51°05′40″N 121°35′16″W	Clinton municipality (21454)		Upload Photo
Wilson Residence and Sheds	Steelhead Provincial Park; Savona BC	50°45′24″N 120°51′57″W	British Columbia (18044)		Upload Photo
Ray Farm Cabin	Near Clearwater BC	52°03′30″N 120°09′22″W	British Columbia (18072)		Upload Photo
Ray Farm Residence	Near Clearwater BC	52°03′31″N 120°09′22″W	British Columbia (18046)		Upload Photo
Hat Creek Ranch	4061 Sea to Sky Highway, Thompson-Nicola Regional District; Hat Creek BC	50°53′07″N 121°24′32″W	British Columbia (2856)		Upload Photo
B.C. Sheep Breeders Building	961 Lorne Street; Kamloops BC	50°40′31″N 120°18′58″W	Kamloops municipality (11832)		
Cattle Car and Caboose	7th Avenue at Front Street; Kamloops BC	50°40′43″N 120°19′23″W	Kamloops municipality (12788)		
CNR Station	500 Lorne Street; Kamloops BC	50°40′44″N 120°19′47″W	Kamloops municipality (11836)		Upload Photo
Hayden House	566 4th Avenue; Kamloops BC	50°40′21″N 120°19′55″W	Kamloops municipality (12787)		
Inland Cigar Factory	295 1st Avenue; Kamloops BC	50°40′32″N 120°20′20″W	Kamloops municipality (12793)		
Kamloops Chinese Cemetery	850 Lombard Street; Kamloops BC	50°40′41″N 120°21′35″W	Kamloops municipality (12794)		Upload Photo
McIntosh Memorial	500 block Columbia Street West; Kamloops BC	50°40′23″N 120°21′11″W	Kamloops municipality (11834)		
Memorial Arena	740 Victoria Street; Kamloops BC	50°40′35″N 120°19′23″W	Kamloops municipality (12137)		
Naval Ammunition Depot Bunkers	1455 McGill Road; Kamloops BC	50°40′31″N 120°23′02″W	Kamloops municipality (12795)		
Old Kamloops Bank of Commerce	118 Victoria Street; Kamloops BC	50°40′35″N 120°20′19″W	Kamloops municipality (12792)		Upload Photo
Old Kamloops Courthouse	7 Seymour Street West; Kamloops BC	50°40′30″N 120°20′20″W	Kamloops municipality (12791)		
Pioneer Cemetery	780 Lorne Street; Kamloops BC	50°40′39″N 120°19′13″W	Kamloops municipality (12785)		Upload Photo
Plaza Hotel	405 Victoria Street; Kamloops BC	50°40′32″N 120°19′55″W	Kamloops municipality (11833)		
St. Andrew's on the Square	159 Seymour Street; Kamloops BC	50°40′29″N 120°20′13″W	Kamloops municipality (11835)		
Stoodley Residence	79 Nicola Street West; Kamloops BC	50°40′22″N 120°20′28″W	Kamloops municipality (12798)		
Stuart Wood School	245 St. Paul Street; Kamloops BC	50°40′25″N 120°20′10″W	Kamloops municipality (12790)		Upload Photo
Tom Bones House	328 Royal Avenue; Kamloops BC	50°41′12″N 120°21′36″W	Kamloops municipality (12796)		
W. A. G. Marlatt House	155 St. Paul Street West; Kamloops BC	50°40′30″N 120°20′35″W	Kamloops municipality (12797)		
William W. Bishop House	619 Nicola Street; Kamloops BC	50°40′19″N 120°19′34″W	Kamloops municipality (12786)		
Wilson House	115 Tranquille Road; Kamloops BC	50°41′05″N 120°21′09″W	Kamloops municipality (12799)		Upload Photo
Steelhead Cemetery	Near Savona BC	50°45′20″N 120°51′58″W	British Columbia (18071)		Upload Photo
