= List of historic places in the Cowichan Valley Regional District =

The following list includes all of the Canadian Register of Historic Places listings in Cowichan Valley Regional District, British Columbia.

Name	Address	Coordinates	Government recognition (CRHP №)	Wikidata ID	Image
Canadian Pacific Railway Station (VIA Rail), Former	120 Canada Avenue; Duncan BC	48°46′40″N 123°42′25″W	Federal (15463)		
516 First Avenue Building	516 First Avenue; Ladysmith BC	48°59′37″N 123°49′04″W	Ladysmith municipality (20308)		Upload Photo
530 First Avenue Building	530 First Avenue; Ladysmith BC	48°59′37″N 123°49′05″W	Ladysmith municipality (16590)		
Coburn-Verchere Residence	641 Third Avenue; Ladysmith BC	48°59′34″N 123°49′18″W	Ladysmith municipality (20328)		Upload Photo
Comox Logging and Railway Shops Building	610 Oyster Bay Drive; Ladysmith BC	48°59′43″N 123°48′57″W	Ladysmith municipality (20271)		Upload Photo
Eagles Hall	921 First Avenue; Ladysmith BC	48°59′46″N 123°49′18″W	Ladysmith municipality (20309)		Upload Photo
Island Hotel	440 First Avenue; Ladysmith BC	48°59′36″N 123°49′03″W	Ladysmith municipality (16588)		Upload Photo
Jessup's Drug Store	18 High Street; Ladysmith BC	48°59′39″N 123°49′04″W	Ladysmith municipality (20329)		Upload Photo
Johnson's Shoes	526-528 First Avenue; Ladysmith BC	48°59′37″N 123°49′04″W	Ladysmith municipality (20332)		Upload Photo
Jones Hotel	12 Gatacre Street; Ladysmith BC	48°59′38″N 123°49′00″W	Ladysmith municipality (20289)		Upload Photo
Ladysmith Agricultural Hall and Sports Field	1110 First Avenue; Ladysmith BC	48°59′50″N 123°49′25″W	Ladysmith municipality (18949)		Upload Photo
Ladysmith Railway Station	Esplanade Avenue; Ladysmith BC	48°59′43″N 123°48′57″W	Ladysmith municipality (20333)		
Ladysmith Trading Company	410 First Avenue; Ladysmith BC	48°59′33″N 123°49′01″W	Ladysmith municipality (16586)		
Mainstreet Building	512 First Avenue; Ladysmith BC	48°59′36″N 123°49′05″W	Ladysmith municipality (16589)		
Masonic Hall	26 Gatacre Street; Ladysmith BC	48°59′37″N 123°49′01″W	Ladysmith municipality (20331)		Upload Photo
Music Hall	18 Roberts Street; Ladysmith BC	48°59′35″N 123°48′57″W	Ladysmith municipality (20330)		Upload Photo
Nicholson Block	436 First Avenue; Ladysmith BC	48°59′35″N 123°49′05″W	Ladysmith municipality (16587)		
Old Post Office	340 Esplanade Avenue; Ladysmith BC	48°59′36″N 123°48′53″W	Ladysmith municipality (20272)		Upload Photo
St. John the Evangelist Anglican Church	314 Buller Street; Ladysmith BC	48°59′34″N 123°49′20″W	Ladysmith municipality (18948)		Upload Photo
Temperance Hotel	32 High Street; Ladysmith BC	48°59′39″N 123°49′05″W	Ladysmith municipality (20274)		Upload Photo
The Convent School	210 Buller Street; Ladysmith BC	48°59′37″N 123°49′15″W	Ladysmith municipality (20288)		Upload Photo
Traveller's Hotel	422 First Avenue; Ladysmith BC	48°59′34″N 123°49′01″W	Ladysmith municipality (6317)		
Kinsol Trestle	Cowichan Valley Trail; Shawnigan Lake BC	48°40′08″N 123°41′38″W	Shawnigan Lake municipality (18478)		
