= List of historic places in northern and central British Columbia Interior =

The following list includes all of the Canadian Register of Historic Places listings in:

- Bulkley-Nechako Regional District,
- Cariboo Regional District,
- Fraser-Fort George Regional District,
- Peace River Country, and
- Stikine Country.

Name	Address	Coordinates	Government recognition (CRHP №)	Wikidata ID	Image
Barkerville		53°3′57″N 121°31′2″W	Federal (14309), British Columbia (1749)	Q808269	More images
Fish Cache	Fort St. James BC	54°26′06″N 124°15′22″W	Federal (2961)		Upload Photo
General Warehouse	Fort St. James BC	54°26′06″N 124°15′22″W	Federal (2963)		
St. Andrew's Church	Bennett Lake BC	59°46′09″N 135°07′05″W	Federal (3653)		More images
Men's House	Fort St. James BC	54°26′06″N 124°15′25″W	Federal (3665)		
Officer's Dwelling	Fort St. James BC	54°26′06″N 124°15′25″W	Federal (3666)		Upload Photo
Fort St. James National Historic Site of Canada	PO Box 1148; Fort St. James BC	54°26′07″N 124°15′25″W	Federal (7617)		
Chilkoot Trail National Historic Site of Canada	Cassiar BC	59°46′02″N 135°06′36″W	Federal (9087)		More images
Federal Building	10401 10th Street, Dawson Creek; Peace River Country BC		Federal (9522)		Upload Photo
Chee Kung Tong Building National Historic Site of Canada	Box 19; Barkerville BC	53°04′00″N 121°31′01″W	Federal (11971)		
Cottonwood House	4660 Highway 26; Cottonwood BC	53°03′02″N 122°09′25″W	British Columbia (15813)		
Fort McLeod National Historic Site of Canada	Carp Lake Road, Fort McLeod Historic Park; McLeod Lake BC	54°59′00″N 123°03′00″W	Federal (16523)		
McLeod's Lake Post	Old Carp Lake Road; McLeod Lake BC	54°59′35″N 123°02′20″W	British Columbia (16592)		
Canadian National Railway Station	Main Street at Railway Avenue; Smithers BC	54°46′41″N 127°10′33″W	Federal (6493)		
Canadian National Railway Station	First Avenue and Main Street; McBride BC	53°18′04″N 120°10′12″W	Federal (6631)		
Fort Alexandria National Historic Site of Canada	Alexandria BC	52°33′47″N 122°28′48″W	Federal (17741)		
108 Mile Heritage Site	Highway 97; 108 Mile Ranch BC	51°45′00″N 121°20′53″W	108 Mile Ranch municipality (18409)		
150 Mile Little Red Schoolhouse	3081 Old Schoolhouse Road; 150 Mile House BC	52°06′28″N 121°55′40″W	150 Mile House municipality (18749)		Upload Photo
150 Mile Courthouse	Highway 97; 150 Mile House BC	52°06′35″N 121°55′42″W	150 Mile House municipality (19032)		Upload Photo
Knoll House	Chilanko Forks BC		Chilanko Forks municipality (19031)		Upload Photo
Telegraph Trail	Roughly, Highway 97 in the Cariboo Regional District; Cariboo Regional District BC	51°45′04″N 121°20′55″W	Cariboo Regional District municipality (20623)		
Blessing's Grave	Highway 26, 43 km east of Quesnel; Pinegrove BC	53°03′48″N 121°56′53″W	British Columbia (21414)		Upload Photo
Potato House	49 Borland Street; Williams Lake BC	52°07′47″N 122°08′46″W	British Columbia (20622)		Upload Photo
