= List of historic places in the North Okanagan Regional District =

The following list includes all of the Canadian Register of Historic Places listings in North Okanagan Regional District, British Columbia.

Name	Address	Coordinates	Government recognition (CRHP №)	Wikidata ID	Image
Mackie Lake House	7808 Kidston Road; Coldstream BC	50°13′26″N 119°15′33″W	British Columbia (5612)		Upload Photo
Bank of Commerce	3117 30th Avenue; Vernon BC	50°15′50″N 119°16′23″W	Vernon municipality (17108)		
Bank of Montreal	2908 32nd Street; Vernon BC	50°15′48″N 119°16′26″W	Vernon municipality (17068)		
Campbell House	2203 30th Avenue; Vernon BC	50°15′50″N 119°15′44″W	Vernon municipality (17063)		
First Crowell House	2805 27th Street; Vernon BC	50°15′46″N 119°15′58″W	Vernon municipality (17062)		
Fred Galbraith House	3203 26th Street; Vernon BC	50°15′57″N 119°15′54″W	Vernon municipality (17101)		Upload Photo
Girouard Cabin and Park	3001 35th Street; Vernon BC	50°15′51″N 119°16′48″W	Vernon municipality (17102)		Upload Photo
Land and Agricultural Company Building	2923 30th Avenue; Vernon BC	50°15′50″N 119°16′12″W	Vernon municipality (17066)		
Mohr House	2301 32nd Avenue; Vernon BC	50°15′56″N 119°15′47″W	Vernon municipality (17064)		Upload Photo
Owens House	2000 37th Avenue; Vernon BC	50°16′07″N 119°15′29″W	Vernon municipality (17070)		Upload Photo
Park School	2704 Highway #6; Vernon BC	50°15′38″N 119°16′16″W	Vernon municipality (17103)		Upload Photo
Pleasant Valley Cemetery	4311 Pleasant Valley Road; Vernon BC	50°16′32″N 119°15′05″W	Vernon municipality (17104)		Upload Photo
Second Crowell House	1800 32nd Avenue, Vernon BC	50°15′54″N 119°15′22″W	Vernon municipality (17067)		
Smith House	1705 32nd Avenue; Vernon BC	50°15′57″N 119°15′18″W	Vernon municipality (17061)		Upload Photo
Spinks/Ellison House	2159 36th Avenue; Vernon BC	50°16′06″N 119°15′36″W	Vernon municipality (17069)		Upload Photo
St. James Catholic Church	2607 27th Street; Vernon BC	50°15′42″N 119°15′58″W	Vernon municipality (17105)		Upload Photo
The Rock Park	3210 Centennial Drive; Vernon BC	50°15′53″N 119°16′48″W	Vernon municipality (17107)		Upload Photo
Urquhart House	2501 23rd Avenue; Vernon BC	50°15′32″N 119°15′54″W	Vernon municipality (17065)		
Vernon CPR Station	3101 29th Street; Vernon BC	50°15′53″N 119°16′08″W	Vernon municipality (17106)		Upload Photo
Vernon Federal Building	3101 32nd Avenue; Vernon BC	50°15′58″N 119°16′19″W	Federal (9590)		Upload Photo
