= List of historic places in the Fraser Valley Regional District =

The following list includes all of the Canadian Register of Historic Places listings in Fraser Valley Regional District, British Columbia.

Name	Address	Coordinates	Government recognition (CRHP №)	Wikidata ID	Image
Abbotsford Sikh Temple National Historic Site of Canada	33089 South Fraser Way; Abbotsford BC	49°03′03″N 122°18′29″W	Federal (9358), Abbotsford municipality (5878)		More images
Agassiz Research Station, Building No. 13	6947 Highway 7 Agassiz BC	49°14′34″N 121°45′48″W	Federal (4381)		Upload Photo
Clayburn Church	4304 Wright Street; Abbotsford BC	49°04′49″N 122°15′40″W	Abbotsford municipality (5881)		More images
Clayburn School	4315 Wright Street; Abbotsford BC	49°04′51″N 122°15′43″W	Abbotsford municipality (5882)		More images
Trethewey House	2313 Ware Street; Abbotsford BC	49°02′37″N 122°18′18″W	Abbotsford municipality (5880)		More images
Brigadier Murphy Armoury	29th & 21st Avenue, Canadian Forces Base Chilliwack; Vernon BC	50°15′21″N 119°16′08″W	Federal (9504)		Upload Photo
Building 24	45420 Vedder Mountain Road; Chilliwack BC	49°06′09″N 121°58′30″W	Federal (11008)		Upload Photo
Chilliwack City Hall National Historic Site of Canada	45820 Spadina Avenue; Chilliwack BC	49°10′07″N 121°57′22″W	Federal (7408)		More images
Church of the Holy Cross National Historic Site of Canada	Skatin BC	49°56′16″N 122°24′36″W	Federal (7410)		
Kilby Store and Farm	215 Kilby Road; Harrison Mills BC	49°14′16″N 121°57′36″W	British Columbia (1748)		More images
Christ Church National Historic Site of Canada	681 Fraser Avenue; Hope BC	49°22′52″N 121°26′38″W	Federal (12564)		More images
Fort Hope National Historic Site of Canada	Corner of Wallace and Water Streets; Hope BC	49°22′43″N 121°26′39″W	Federal (19613)		
Othello Tunnels	Hope BC	49°22′14″N 121°21′58″W	British Columbia (18065)		
Royal Engineers' Road	Hope BC	49°14′04″N 121°07′23″W	British Columbia (18056)		
Mission Memorial Centre	33070 5th Avenue; Mission BC	49°08′17″N 122°18′28″W	Mission municipality (19414)		Upload Photo
Mission Museum	33201 2nd Avenue; Mission BC	49°08′07″N 122°18′17″W	Mission municipality (19413)		Upload Photo
Silverhill Hall	31016 Silverhill Avenue; Mission BC	49°10′36″N 122°21′53″W	Mission municipality (19426)		Upload Photo
Stave Falls Hydro-Electric Installation National Historic Site of Canada	Mission BC	49°13′43″N 122°21′22″W	Federal (13213), Mission municipality (19425)		More images
Xá:ytem / Hatzic Rock National Historic Site of Canada	35087 Lougheed Highway; Mission BC	49°09′04″N 122°15′04″W	Federal (2256)		More images
Alexandra Bridge	Old Highway 1 Spuzzum BC	49°42′27″N 121°25′01″W	British Columbia (18067)		More images
Royal Engineers' Road at Alexandra Bridge	Spuzzum BC	49°42′26″N 121°24′50″W	British Columbia (18042)		
Church of St. John the Divine	Douglas Street; Yale BC	49°33′46″N 121°25′55″W	British Columbia (6190)		More images
