= List of historic places in the Kootenay Boundary Regional District =

The following list includes all of the Canadian Register of Historic Places listings in Kootenay Boundary Regional District, British Columbia.

Name	Address	Coordinates	Government recognition (CRHP №)	Wikidata ID	Image
Canadian Pacific Railway Station	7654 Donaldson Drive; Grand Forks BC	49°01′52″N 118°27′52″W	Federal (6702)		Upload Photo
Bank of Montreal	2004 Columbia Avenue; Rossland BC	49°04′37″N 117°48′02″W	Rossland municipality (20460)		Upload Photo
Bellevue Hotel	2003 Second Avenue; Rossland BC	49°04′46″N 117°47′59″W	Rossland municipality (20423)		Upload Photo
Bodega Hotel	2054 Washington Street; Rossland BC	49°04′40″N 117°48′01″W	Rossland municipality (20463)		Upload Photo
Calvary Cemetery	Esling Drive; Rossland BC	49°04′13″N 117°47′39″W	Rossland municipality (20544)		Upload Photo
Collins Hotel	2038 Washington Street; Rossland BC	49°04′39″N 117°48′01″W	Rossland municipality (20462)		Upload Photo
Columbia Cemetery	Highway 3B, north of Mountain View Cemetery; Rossland BC	49°04′46″N 117°46′59″W	Rossland municipality (20560)		Upload Photo
Drill Hall	2095 Monte Christo Street; Rossland BC	49°04′40″N 117°47′43″W	Rossland municipality (20421)		Upload Photo
Father Pat Monument	Fountain on sidewalk at 2071 Columbia Avenue; Rossland BC	49°04′37″N 117°47′55″W	Rossland municipality (20541)		Upload Photo
Glazan Block	1916 First Avenue; Rossland BC	49°04′42″N 117°48′05″W	Rossland municipality (20464)		Upload Photo
Hoffman House	2044 Washington Street; Rossland BC	49°04′39″N 117°48′01″W	Rossland municipality (20461)		Upload Photo
Montreal Hotel	2190 Columbia Avenue; Rossland BC	49°04′37″N 117°47′50″W	Rossland municipality (20521)		Upload Photo
Red Mountain Mining Site	1100 Highway 3B; Rossland BC	49°04′47″N 117°48′58″W	Rossland municipality (20520)		Upload Photo
Red Mountain Ski Area	4300 Red Mountain Road; Rossland BC	49°06′10″N 117°49′13″W	Rossland municipality (20540)		Upload Photo
Rossland Court House National Historic Site of Canada	2288 Columbia Street; Rossland BC	49°04′37″N 117°47′46″W	Federal (7838)		
Rossland Miners Union Hall	1795 Columbia Avenue; Rossland BC	49°04′37″N 117°48′18″W	British Columbia (6175)		Upload Photo
Rossland Swimming Pool	1869 Columbia Avenue; Rossland BC	49°04′38″N 117°48′10″W	Rossland municipality (20145)		Upload Photo
Rossland Tennis Courts	2630 Leroi Avenue; Rossland BC	49°04′33″N 117°47′24″W	Rossland municipality (20146)		Upload Photo
Sacred Heart Catholic Church	2396 Columbia Avenue; Rossland BC	49°04′36″N 117°47′39″W	Rossland municipality (20422)		
St. Andrew's Presbyterian Church	2110 First Avenue; Rossland BC	49°04′41″N 117°47′53″W	Rossland municipality (20465)		
