= List of historic places in the East Kootenay Regional District =

The following list includes all of the Canadian Register of Historic Places listings in East Kootenay Regional District, British Columbia.

Name	Address	Coordinates	Government recognition (CRHP №)	Wikidata ID	Image
Fort Steele	9851 Highway 93/95, Fort Steele BC	49°37′35″N 115°37′55″W	Federal (17703), British Columbia (6185)		
Kootenae House National Historic Site of Canada	Westside Road; Invermere BC	50°31′35″N 116°02′46″W	Federal (9614)		Upload Photo
Floe Lake Warden Patrol Cabin	Kootenay National Park BC	51°03′18″N 116°08′17″W	Federal (2884)		
Aquacourt	Radium Hot Springs BC	50°37′44″N 115°55′59″W	Federal (1637)		
Wildhorse Creek Historic Site	Wildhorse River Forest Service Road; East Kootenay BC	49°39′40″N 115°35′01″W	British Columbia (20640)		Upload Photo
