= List of historic places in the Metro Vancouver Regional District =

The following list includes all of the Canadian Register of Historic Places listings outside of the City of Vancouver, but still within the Metro Vancouver Regional District of British Columbia.

Name	Address	Coordinates	Government recognition (CRHP №)	Wikidata ID	Image
Aintree	6825 Cariboo Road; Burnaby BC	49°14′56″N 122°54′54″W	Burnaby municipality (3793)		More images
Altese	3762 Thurston Street; Burnaby BC	49°14′04″N 123°01′16″W	Burnaby municipality (3798)		Upload Photo
Altnadene	6490 Dear Lake Avenue; Burnaby BC	49°14′28″N 122°58′08″W	Burnaby municipality (2355)		More images
Anderson Residence	6450 Deer Lake Avenue; Burnaby BC	49°14′25″N 122°58′08″W	Burnaby municipality (2493)		More images
Avalon	6664 Deer Lake Avenue; Burnaby BC	49°14′17″N 122°58′01″W	Burnaby municipality (2487)		More images
Baldwin House	6543 Deer Lake Drive; Burnaby BC	49°13′58″N 122°58′05″W	Burnaby municipality (2357)		More images
Bells Dry Goods Store	6501 Deer Lake Avenue; Burnaby BC	49°14′23″N 122°58′01″W	Burnaby municipality (2698)		More images
Burnaby Civic Employees Union Memorial Fountain	6501 Deer Lake Avenue; Burnaby BC	49°14′24″N 122°58′01″W	Burnaby municipality (2696)		Upload Photo
Burnaby South High School Cenotaph and Memorial Tennis Courts	6650 Southoaks Crescent; Burnaby BC	49°13′03″N 122°58′01″W	Burnaby municipality (2490)		More images
Central Park Gate	3883 Imperial Street; Burnaby BC	49°13′57″N 123°01′12″W	Burnaby municipality (2660)		More images
Coburn House	5170 Boundary Road; Burnaby BC	49°14′14″N 123°01′23″W	Burnaby municipality (3802)		Upload Photo
Cunningham House	3555 Douglas Road; Burnaby BC	49°15′09″N 122°58′59″W	Burnaby municipality (3794)		Upload Photo
Deerholme	6110 Price Street; Burnaby BC	49°14′21″N 122°58′26″W	Burnaby municipality (2489)		More images
Drs. Blythe and Violet Eagles Estate	5655 Sperling Avenue; Burnaby BC	49°14′03″N 122°57′58″W	Burnaby municipality (2358)		Upload Photo
Edgar Residence	6450 Deer Lake Drive; Burnaby BC	49°13′58″N 122°58′12″W	Burnaby municipality (2488)		More images
Elworth	6501 Deer Lake Avenue; Burnaby BC	49°14′24″N 122°58′05″W	Burnaby municipality (2697)		More images
Fairacres Chauffeur's Cottage	6344 Deer Lake Avenue; Burnaby BC	49°14′28″N 122°58′19″W	Burnaby municipality (16863)		More images
Fairacres Garage and Stables	6344 Deer Lake Avenue; Burnaby BC	49°14′29″N 122°58′19″W	Burnaby municipality (16864)		More images
Fairacres Mansion	6344 Deer Lake Avenue; Burnaby BC	49°14′27″N 122°58′16″W	Burnaby municipality (2354)		
Fairacres Root House	6344 Deer Lake Avenue; Burnaby BC	49°14′27″N 122°58′19″W	Burnaby municipality (16861)		More images
Fairacres Steam Plant	6344 Deer Lake Avenue; Burnaby BC	49°14′25″N 122°58′19″W	Burnaby municipality (16862)		More images
Floden House	7244 4th Street; Burnaby BC	49°13′41″N 122°56′02″W	Burnaby municipality (3795)		More images
Glen-Lyon	4250 Marine Drive; Burnaby BC	49°12′26″N 123°00′32″W	Burnaby municipality (3804)		Upload Photo
Glenedward	5152 Kingsway; Burnaby BC	49°13′30″N 122°59′24″W	Burnaby municipality (3792)		More images
Jubilee Grove Arch	3883 Imperial Street; Burnaby BC	49°13′56″N 123°00′47″W	Burnaby municipality (2359)		More images
Kingsway East School	6650 Southoaks Crescent; Burnaby BC	49°13′03″N 122°57′58″W	Burnaby municipality (2491)		More images
Lochdale Community Hall	490 Sperling Avenue; Burnaby BC	49°16′47″N 122°57′50″W	Burnaby municipality (2356)		Upload Photo
Love House	6501 Deer Lake Avenue; Burnaby BC	49°14′21″N 122°57′58″W	Burnaby municipality (2701)		More images
Mackie House	6445 Arbroath Street; Burnaby BC	49°13′07″N 122°58′08″W	Burnaby municipality (3790)		More images
Morrison House	3765 Albert Street; Burnaby BC	49°16′56″N 123°01′19″W	Burnaby municipality (3800)		
North Burnaby Cenotaph	250 Willingdon Avenue; Burnaby BC	49°17′05″N 123°00′00″W	Burnaby municipality (2492)		More images
Overlynn	3755 McGill Street; Burnaby BC	49°17′20″N 123°01′19″W	Burnaby municipality (3799)		
Patterson House	7106 18th Avenue; Burnaby BC	49°12′51″N 122°57′18″W	Burnaby municipality (3797)		More images
Seaforth School	6501 Deer Lake Avenue; Burnaby BC	49°14′23″N 122°58′01″W	Burnaby municipality (2699)		Upload Photo
Shaw House	7725 4th Street; Burnaby BC	49°13′20″N 122°55′41″W	Burnaby municipality (3796)		Upload Photo
Shearer House	5573 Buckingham Avenue; Burnaby BC	49°14′08″N 122°57′36″W	Burnaby municipality (3791)		More images
St. John the Divine Anglican Church	3891 Kingsway; Burnaby BC	49°14′00″N 123°01′05″W	Burnaby municipality (3803)		More images
Thomas Irvine House	6501 Deer Lake Avenue; Burnaby BC	49°14′24″N 122°58′01″W	Burnaby municipality (2700)		Upload Photo
Vorce Station	6501 Deer Lake Avenue; Burnaby BC	49°14′25″N 122°58′05″W	Burnaby municipality (2695)		More images
Walker Residence	5255 Sperling Avenue; Burnaby BC	49°14′12″N 122°57′54″W	Burnaby municipality (2486)		More images
Wilson House	6088 Wilson Avenue; Burnaby BC	49°13′45″N 123°00′36″W	Burnaby municipality (3801)		Upload Photo
Wintemute House	7640 Berkley Street; Burnaby BC	49°13′45″N 122°56′56″W	Burnaby municipality (3789)		More images
Riverview Hospital	2601 Lougheed Highway; Coquitlam BC	49°15′34″N 122°47′53″W	Coquitlam municipality (11074)		More images
Alasken-Reifel Shooting Lodge	5421 Robertson Road; Delta BC	49°05′00″N 123°09′00″W	Federal (4379)		Upload Photo
Alex Fisher Residence	3691 72 Street; Delta BC	49°04′12″N 123°01′48″W	Delta municipality (6357)		Upload Photo
Alfred Jensen Residence	11192 River Road; Delta BC	49°10′36″N 122°54′47″W	Delta municipality (15289)		Upload Photo
Arthur Residence and Barn	6166 34B Avenue; Delta BC	49°03′45″N 123°03′07″W	Delta municipality (6368)		More images
Asbury/Erskine Farm	4769 112 Street; Delta BC	49°05′19″N 122°54′58″W	Delta municipality (6361)		Upload Photo
Avondale	2349 52 Street; Delta BC	49°02′35″N 123°05′06″W	Delta municipality (6352)		Upload Photo
Bank of Montreal	4896 Delta Street; Delta BC	49°05′31″N 123°05′12″W	Delta municipality (6369)		Upload Photo
Benson Residence	3610 72 Street; Delta BC	49°04′06″N 123°01′23″W	Delta municipality (15258)		Upload Photo
Bishop Residence	4388 Arthur Drive; Delta BC	49°04′58″N 123°04′41″W	Delta municipality (6356)		More images
Black Residence	3395 41B Street; Delta BC	49°03′54″N 123°06′47″W	Delta municipality (6364)		Upload Photo
Boundary Bay Cemetery	856 56 Street; Delta BC	49°01′05″N 123°03′58″W	Delta municipality (15260)		Upload Photo
Brackman-Ker Warehouse	4849 Chisholm Street; Delta BC	49°05′31″N 123°05′20″W	Delta municipality (15563)		Upload Photo
Burrvilla	6001 River Road; Delta BC	49°07′35″N 123°03′29″W	Delta municipality (6340)		Upload Photo
Cammidge Residence	550 Boundary Bay Road; Delta BC	49°00′54″N 123°02′38″W	Delta municipality (15259)		More images
Delta Municipal Hall	4858 Delta Street; Delta BC	49°05′28″N 123°05′10″W	Delta municipality (3669)		Upload Photo
Ellis Residence	4826 48 Avenue; Delta BC	49°05′24″N 123°05′23″W	Delta municipality (15330)		Upload Photo
Fawcett Residence	5058 47A Avenue; Delta BC	49°05′07″N 123°04′45″W	Delta municipality (15257)		Upload Photo
Fawcett Residence	4532 Arthur Drive; Delta BC	49°05′21″N 123°05′00″W	Delta municipality (15328)		Upload Photo
Flick Residence	5584 8A Avenue; Delta BC	49°01′04″N 123°04′08″W	Delta municipality (6348)		Upload Photo
Forrer Residence	4580 Arthur Drive; Delta BC	49°05′10″N 123°04′44″W	Delta municipality (6362)		Upload Photo
Guichon Residence and Barn	3020 41B Street; Delta BC	49°03′24″N 123°06′14″W	Delta municipality (6363)		More images
Hangar at Boundary Bay Airport	4400 72nd Street; Delta BC	49°04′49″N 123°00′40″W	Delta municipality (3667)		
Hodge/Bates Residence, Barn and Outbuildings	5526 34B Avenue; Delta BC	49°03′49″N 123°04′01″W	Delta municipality (6367)		More images
Inverholme School	6001 River Road; Delta BC	49°07′36″N 123°03′22″W	Delta municipality (6341)		
John McKee Residence	4705 Arthur Drive; Delta BC	49°05′19″N 123°04′52″W	Delta municipality (6346)		More images
Johnson Residence	10274 River Road; Delta BC	49°09′29″N 122°56′20″W	Delta municipality (15326)		Upload Photo
Kerr Residence	3621 Arthur Drive; Delta BC	49°04′08″N 123°04′40″W	Delta municipality (15256)		Upload Photo
Kyte Residence	4907 Central Avenue; Delta BC	49°05′33″N 123°04′48″W	Delta municipality (6349)		Upload Photo
Ladner Baptist Church	5008 47A Avenue; Delta BC	49°05′20″N 123°05′06″W	Delta municipality (6371)		Upload Photo
Ladner Clock Tower	4858 Delta Street; Delta BC	49°05′28″N 123°05′10″W	Delta municipality (15287)		Upload Photo
Lambert Residence	4671 Arthur Drive; Delta BC	49°05′16″N 123°04′48″W	Delta municipality (15332)		Upload Photo
Lanning, Fawcett & Wilson Ltd. Store	4907 Chisholm Street; Delta BC	49°05′33″N 123°05′17″W	Delta municipality (15263)		More images
Mason Residence	4306 Arthur Drive; Delta BC	49°04′53″N 123°04′42″W	Delta municipality (15331)		Upload Photo
McKenzie Residence	4994 45 Avenue; Delta BC	49°05′06″N 123°05′06″W	Delta municipality (15264)		Upload Photo
Nels Johnson Residence	10306 Main Street; Delta BC	49°09′24″N 122°56′17″W	Delta municipality (15253)		Upload Photo
Nesbitt Residence	10455 River Road; Delta BC	49°09′42″N 122°56′02″W	Delta municipality (6360)		Upload Photo
Nicolich Residence	4126 River Road West; Delta BC	49°05′02″N 123°06′36″W	Delta municipality (6351)		Upload Photo
Norwegian Cemetery	8700 Brooke Road; Delta BC	49°09′44″N 122°55′26″W	Delta municipality (15254)		Upload Photo
Olaf Stokkeland Residence	11096 River Road; Delta BC	49°10′23″N 122°54′58″W	Delta municipality (15333)		Upload Photo
Parmiter Residence	5331 34B Avenue; Delta BC	49°04′02″N 123°04′34″W	Delta municipality (6366)		More images
Paterson House	7234 Ladner Trunk Road; Delta BC	49°05′22″N 123°01′23″W	Delta municipality (6342)		Upload Photo
Rock Pybus Residence and Barn	3028 53 Street; Delta BC	49°03′28″N 123°04′16″W	Delta municipality (6353)		Upload Photo
Roycroft	4856 48 Street; Delta BC	49°05′24″N 123°05′19″W	Delta municipality (6370)		Upload Photo
Rupert Fisher Residence	3865 72 Street; Delta BC	49°04′25″N 123°01′48″W	Delta municipality (6350)		Upload Photo
Scopinich Residence	4170 River Road West; Delta BC	49°05′04″N 123°06′29″W	Delta municipality (15261)		Upload Photo
Sheldrake Barn	5734 River Road; Delta BC	49°06′24″N 123°03′54″W	Delta municipality (15329)		Upload Photo
Sherman Residence	4395 Savoy Street; Delta BC	49°05′10″N 123°06′07″W	Delta municipality (6354)		More images
St. Mungo Store	10276 River Road; Delta BC	49°09′30″N 122°56′20″W	Delta municipality (15325)		Upload Photo
St. Stephen's United Church	9696 Ladner Trunk Road; Delta BC	49°05′30″N 122°57′14″W	Delta municipality (3668)		Upload Photo
Thomas Kerr Residence	4604 River Road West; Delta BC	49°05′18″N 123°05′46″W	Delta municipality (6347)		More images
Totem Pole	4858 Delta Street; Delta BC	49°05′28″N 123°05′10″W	Delta municipality (15288)		Upload Photo
Trinity Norwegian Lutheran Church	11040 River Road; Delta BC	49°10′14″N 122°54′54″W	Delta municipality (15265)		Upload Photo
Victoria Terminal Railway and Ferry Company Station	4481 Savoy Street; Delta BC	49°05′12″N 123°05′56″W	Delta municipality (6344)		
Walter Pybus Residence and Barn	5300 34B Avenue; Delta BC	49°03′52″N 123°04′30″W	Delta municipality (6365)		More images
Williamson Residence	4820 48 Avenue; Delta BC	49°05′25″N 123°05′24″W	Delta municipality (15255)		Upload Photo
Big House	Langley BC	49°10′08″N 122°34′26″W	Federal (4275)		More images
Fort Langley Community Hall	9167 Glover Crescent; Langley BC	49°10′06″N 122°34′48″W	Langley municipality (1862)		More images
Fort Langley National Historic Site of Canada	23433 Mavis Avenue; Langley BC	49°10′04″N 122°34′19″W	Federal (7614)		More images
Harrower House	21860 Old Yale Road; Langley BC	49°05′20″N 122°37′01″W	Langley municipality (1857)		Upload Photo
Lamb/Stirling House	21864 Old Yale Road; Langley BC	49°05′20″N 122°37′05″W	Langley municipality (1856)		Upload Photo
Matheson House	19893 64th Avenue; Langley BC	49°07′11″N 122°40′16″W	Langley municipality (1861)		More images
Moir Residence	6840 Glover Road; Langley BC	49°07′38″N 122°37′26″W	Langley municipality (1858)		Upload Photo
Northeast Bastion	Langley BC	49°10′05″N 122°34′08″W	Federal (4273)		More images
Redwood Trees	21600 96th Avenue; Langley BC	49°10′36″N 122°37′08″W	Langley municipality (1863)		Upload Photo
Servants' Quarters	Fort Langley National Historic Site; Langley BC	49°10′08″N 122°34′26″W	Federal (4272)		More images
Storehouse	23433 Mavis Street; Langley BC	49°10′08″N 122°34′26″W	Federal (2964)		More images
Canadian Northern Railway Station	23245 Mavis Street and Glover Road; Langley District BC	49°10′14″N 122°34′41″W	Langley District municipality (1845)		More images
Lochiel School	710 204 Street; Langley District BC	49°00′54″N 122°39′25″W	Langley District municipality (1844)		More images
Sperling Church and Hall	7206 240th Street; Langley District BC	49°08′01″N 122°33′32″W	Langley District municipality (1855)		Upload Photo
Telegraph Trail	72nd Avenue; Langley District BC	49°08′23″N 122°32′42″W	Langley District municipality (1860)		Upload Photo
Traveller's Hotel	21628 48th Avenue; Langley District BC	49°05′20″N 122°37′26″W	Langley District municipality (1852)		More images
F. J. Hart Building	3190 271 Street; Langley District BC	49°03′35″N 122°28′19″W	Langley District municipality (1853)		Upload Photo
Bank of Montreal	22355 River Road; Maple Ridge BC	49°12′44″N 122°36′11″W	Maple Ridge municipality (1909)		Upload Photo
Byrnes Properties	26887 and River Road; Maple Ridge BC	49°10′24″N 122°28′37″W	Maple Ridge municipality (1872)		Upload Photo
Haney Post Office	22365 Callighan Street; Maple Ridge BC	49°12′49″N 122°36′11″W	Maple Ridge municipality (1912)		Upload Photo
Hill House	9992 240 Street; Maple Ridge BC	49°11′03″N 122°33′22″W	Maple Ridge municipality (1911)		Upload Photo
Leslie Residence	21695 River Road; Maple Ridge BC	49°12′52″N 122°37′12″W	Maple Ridge municipality (1878)		Upload Photo
Manager's House, Port Haney Brick Company	22520 116 Avenue; Maple Ridge BC	49°12′37″N 122°35′49″W	Maple Ridge municipality (1906)		Upload Photo
Maple Ridge Cemetery	214 Street; Maple Ridge BC	49°13′09″N 122°37′41″W	Maple Ridge municipality (1907)		Upload Photo
Masonic Hall	22272 116th Avenue; Maple Ridge BC	49°12′48″N 122°36′18″W	Maple Ridge municipality (1877)		Upload Photo
McFarlane Residence	11395 205 Street; Maple Ridge BC	49°12′34″N 122°39′14″W	Maple Ridge municipality (1910)		Upload Photo
Port Haney Brick Company Office	22520 116th Avenue; Maple Ridge BC	49°12′39″N 122°35′53″W	Maple Ridge municipality (1876)		Upload Photo
Renstrom Residence	20540 Lorne Avenue; Maple Ridge BC	49°12′31″N 122°39′11″W	Maple Ridge municipality (1908)		Upload Photo
St. Andrew's Presbyterian Church	22279 116 Avenue; Maple Ridge BC	49°12′48″N 122°36′18″W	Maple Ridge municipality (1875)		More images
Sugar Maple Trees	26721 100 Avenue; Maple Ridge BC	49°11′05″N 122°28′55″W	Maple Ridge municipality (1873)		More images
Whonnock General Store	26927 River Road; Maple Ridge BC	49°10′25″N 122°28′34″W	Maple Ridge municipality (1871)		More images
Whonnock Post Office	26915 River Road; Maple Ridge BC	49°10′25″N 122°28′37″W	Maple Ridge municipality (1870)		More images
Blaney Residence	13074 Harris Road; Pitt Meadows BC	49°14′28″N 122°41′13″W	Pitt Meadows municipality (10254)		Upload Photo
Hoffman and Son Shop and House	12265 Harris Road; Pitt Meadows BC	49°13′32″N 122°41′24″W	Pitt Meadows municipality (10248)		
McMyn/Masson Residence	19175 122 Avenue; Pitt Meadows BC	49°13′29″N 122°41′28″W	Pitt Meadows municipality (10252)		Upload Photo
Park Residence	19341 Lougheed Highway; Pitt Meadows BC	49°13′51″N 122°41′06″W	Pitt Meadows municipality (10256)		Upload Photo
Pitt Meadows Community Church	12109 Harris Road; Pitt Meadows BC	49°13′22″N 122°41′24″W	Pitt Meadows municipality (10251)		
Pitt Meadows General Store and Post Office	12294 Harris Road; Pitt Meadows BC	49°13′33″N 122°41′20″W	Pitt Meadows municipality (10247)		More images
Pitt Meadows Municipal Hall	12460 Harris Road; Pitt Meadows BC	49°13′44″N 122°41′20″W	Pitt Meadows municipality (10249)		
Pitt Meadows School House	13414 Harris Road; Pitt Meadows BC	49°14′46″N 122°41′20″W	Pitt Meadows municipality (10250)		Upload Photo
Struthers Residence	12229 Harris Road; Pitt Meadows BC	49°13′30″N 122°41′24″W	Pitt Meadows municipality (10253)		Upload Photo
von Alvensleben Residence	14776 Harris Road; Pitt Meadows BC	49°16′13″N 122°41′17″W	Pitt Meadows municipality (10255)		Upload Photo
Melissa Park Lodge	2175 Mary Hill Road; Port Coquitlam BC	49°15′21″N 122°46′43″W	Port Coquitlam municipality (20334)		Upload Photo
2628 St. George Street	2628 St. George Street (south part of lot); Port Moody BC	49°16′32″N 122°51′10″W	Port Moody municipality (19429)		Upload Photo
Alexander Residence	2628 St. George Street (north part of lot); Port Moody BC	49°16′33″N 122°51′10″W	Port Moody municipality (17844)		Upload Photo
Appleyard Residence	126 Kyle Street; Port Moody BC	49°16′33″N 122°51′23″W	Port Moody municipality (2584)		Upload Photo
Barnum Residence	2625 St. George Street; Port Moody BC	49°16′31″N 122°51′11″W	Port Moody municipality (11814)		Upload Photo
BC Telephone Company Exchange	2317 Clarke Street; Port Moody BC	49°16′39″N 122°51′36″W	Port Moody municipality (7664)		
Belcarra South Cottages	Belcarra Provincial Park; Port Moody BC	49°18′37″N 122°55′39″W	Port Moody municipality (21175)		Upload Photo
Belton Residence	300 Second Avenue; Port Moody BC	49°18′16″N 122°52′30″W	Port Moody municipality (18532)		Upload Photo
Bole House	Belcarra Bay Road; Port Moody BC	49°18′32″N 122°55′41″W	Port Moody municipality (2585)		Upload Photo
Brelsford Residence	2713 Jane Street; Port Moody BC	49°16′26″N 122°51′04″W	Port Moody municipality (7669)		Upload Photo
C.P. Lumber Co. Residence	2226 Clarke Street; Port Moody BC	49°16′40″N 122°51′40″W	Port Moody municipality (2565)		Upload Photo
Campbell Residence	2209 St. George Street; Port Moody BC	49°16′31″N 122°51′47″W	Port Moody municipality (10356)		Upload Photo
Carr Residence	2605 St. George Street; Port Moody BC	49°16′33″N 122°51′15″W	Port Moody municipality (19428)		Upload Photo
Chivers Residence	306 First Avenue; Port Moody BC	49°18′19″N 122°52′26″W	Port Moody municipality (18531)		
Clarke Residence	207 Second Street; Port Moody BC	49°18′16″N 122°52′28″W	Port Moody municipality (18533)		Upload Photo
Clement Elsdon Residence	2221 St. George Street; Port Moody BC	49°16′31″N 122°51′47″W	Port Moody municipality (10357)		Upload Photo
CPR Railway Station	2734 Murray Street; Port Moody BC	49°16′45″N 122°51′04″W	Port Moody municipality (2562)		Upload Photo
Davis Residence	306 Second Avenue; Port Moody BC	49°18′18″N 122°52′30″W	Port Moody municipality (18571)		
Dr. Cartwright Residence	2214 St. George Street; Port Moody BC	49°16′33″N 122°51′47″W	Port Moody municipality (7668)		Upload Photo
Elsdon Residence	2225 St. George Street; Port Moody BC	49°16′31″N 122°51′43″W	Port Moody municipality (11813)		Upload Photo
Etter's Beauty Salon and Barber Shop	2335 Clarke Street; Port Moody BC	49°16′39″N 122°51′32″W	Port Moody municipality (7598)		Upload Photo
Gilfillan Residence	2 Dowding Road; Port Moody BC	49°17′27″N 122°50′35″W	Port Moody municipality (7666)		
Griffin Residence	2714 Henry Street; Port Moody BC	49°16′30″N 122°51′04″W	Port Moody municipality (17865)		Upload Photo
Horne Residence	307 Third Avenue; Port Moody BC	49°18′18″N 122°52′34″W	Port Moody municipality (10352)		
Hotel Burrard	2414 St. Johns Street; Port Moody BC	49°16′38″N 122°51′25″W	Port Moody municipality (7665)		Upload Photo
Hull Residence	2518 St. George Street; Port Moody BC	49°16′33″N 122°51′19″W	Port Moody municipality (19427)		Upload Photo
Hutchinson Residence	359 Ioco Road; Port Moody BC	49°17′06″N 122°50′00″W	Port Moody municipality (19431)		
Ioco Community Hall	100-block Third Avenue; Port Moody BC	49°18′13″N 122°52′37″W	Port Moody municipality (18536)		
Ioco Grocery Store	Third Avenue; Port Moody BC	49°18′10″N 122°52′37″W	Port Moody municipality (18538)		
Ioco School	101 First Avenue; Port Moody BC	49°18′10″N 122°52′23″W	Port Moody municipality (10349)		
Ioco United Church	1790 Ioco Road; Port Moody BC	49°18′08″N 122°52′23″W	Port Moody municipality (10350)		
John's Barber Shop	2337 Clarke Street; Port Moody BC	49°16′39″N 122°51′32″W	Port Moody municipality (5778)		Upload Photo
Kilvert Residence	203 Fourth Avenue; Port Moody BC	49°18′14″N 122°52′37″W	Port Moody municipality (18573)		
MacDonald and Betterton Residence	304 Second Avenue; Port Moody BC	49°18′18″N 122°52′30″W	Port Moody municipality (18537)		
Martha Johnston Residence	2131 St. Johns Street; Port Moody BC	49°16′35″N 122°51′50″W	Port Moody municipality (10354)		Upload Photo
McLean Residence	2224 Clarke Street; Port Moody BC	49°16′40″N 122°51′43″W	Port Moody municipality (2566)		
McNeice Residence	2201 St. George Street; Port Moody BC	49°16′31″N 122°51′50″W	Port Moody municipality (10355)		Upload Photo
Medley Residence	200 Third Avenue; Port Moody BC	49°18′13″N 122°52′34″W	Port Moody municipality (10351)		
Miller Residence	641 Ioco Road; Port Moody BC	49°17′29″N 122°50′49″W	Port Moody municipality (7667)		Upload Photo
Moisio Residence	2614 St. Johns Street; Port Moody BC	49°16′37″N 122°51′14″W	Port Moody municipality (17863)		Upload Photo
Nielsen Residence	112 Moray Street; Port Moody BC	49°16′34″N 122°50′06″W	Port Moody municipality (19430)		
Old City Hall	2425 St. Johns Street; Port Moody BC	49°16′35″N 122°51′22″W	Port Moody municipality (2564)		Upload Photo
Old Orchard Park Caretaker's Residence	644 Bentley Road; Port Moody BC	49°17′25″N 122°50′49″W	Port Moody municipality (19433)		Upload Photo
P. Burns and Co. Butcher Shop	2419 Clarke Street; Port Moody BC	49°16′39″N 122°51′25″W	Port Moody municipality (2583)		Upload Photo
Pleasantside Grocery	631 Ioco Road; Port Moody BC	49°17′28″N 122°50′38″W	Port Moody municipality (2586)		
Potter Residence	316 Second Avenue; Port Moody BC	49°18′21″N 122°52′30″W	Port Moody municipality (18534)		Upload Photo
Reynolds Residence	207 Third Avenue; Port Moody BC	49°18′15″N 122°52′34″W	Port Moody municipality (18550)		Upload Photo
Roe Residence	2227 St. Johns Street; Port Moody BC	49°16′36″N 122°51′43″W	Port Moody municipality (2563)		Upload Photo
Royal Bank	2346 Clarke Street; Port Moody BC	49°16′41″N 122°51′32″W	Port Moody municipality (5771)		
Runnels Residence	303 Third Avenue; Port Moody BC	49°18′17″N 122°52′34″W	Port Moody municipality (18572)		Upload Photo
St. John the Apostle Anglican Church	2208 St. Johns Street; Port Moody BC	49°16′37″N 122°51′50″W	Port Moody municipality (10353)		Upload Photo
Symmes Residence	2222 St. Johns Street; Port Moody BC	49°16′37″N 122°51′43″W	Port Moody municipality (17864)		Upload Photo
Thurston Residence	140 Moody Street; Port Moody BC	49°16′30″N 122°51′00″W	Port Moody municipality (17862)		Upload Photo
Tremaine Residence	205 Second Avenue; Port Moody BC	49°18′15″N 122°52′26″W	Port Moody municipality (18570)		
Vaughan Residence	125 Elgin Street; Port Moody BC	49°16′33″N 122°51′42″W	Port Moody municipality (11811)		Upload Photo
White Residence	2329 St. Johns Street; Port Moody BC	49°16′36″N 122°51′35″W	Port Moody municipality (10358)		Upload Photo
Williams Residence	2214 Clarke Street; Port Moody BC	49°16′40″N 122°51′48″W	Port Moody municipality (11812)		
7011 Ash Street	7011 Ash Street; Richmond BC	49°09′46″N 123°07′12″W	Richmond municipality (2392)		Upload Photo
Abercrombie House	13333 Princess Street; Richmond BC	49°06′59″N 123°09′22″W	Richmond municipality (2390)		Upload Photo
BCIT Hangar, Building T-131 at the Vancouver International Airport	5301 Airport Road South; Richmond BC	49°10′48″N 123°09′58″W	Federal (16127)		Upload Photo
Branscombe House	4900 Steveston Highway; Richmond BC	49°08′01″N 123°10′12″W	Richmond municipality (1131)		More images
Brighouse Homestead and Heritage Trees	6900 River Road; Richmond BC	49°10′35″N 123°08′49″W	Richmond municipality (2384)		Upload Photo
Brighouse Lacrosse Box	7840 Granville Avenue; Richmond BC	49°09′42″N 123°08′20″W	Richmond municipality (2368)		Upload Photo
Britannia Shipyard National Historic Site of Canada	5189 Westwater Drive; Richmond BC	49°07′17″N 123°10′08″W	Federal (7819)		Upload Photo
CPR Power Poles and Railway Tracks	4005 Moncton Street; Richmond BC	49°07′35″N 123°10′41″W	Richmond municipality (2396)		Upload Photo
Eldstrom House	9711 Finn Road; Richmond BC	49°07′13″N 123°07′01″W	Richmond municipality (2385)		Upload Photo
General Currie School	8220 General Currie Road; Richmond BC	49°09′32″N 123°08′02″W	Richmond municipality (2362)		Upload Photo
Gilmore Potato Pit	10631 Dyke Road; Richmond BC	49°06′59″N 123°06′29″W	Richmond municipality (11757)		Upload Photo
Goldie Harris House	11620 No. 4 Road; Richmond BC	49°07′40″N 123°06′50″W	Richmond municipality (11756)		Upload Photo
Gulf of Georgia Cannery National Historic Site of Canada	12138 4th Avenue; Richmond BC	49°07′29″N 123°11′13″W	Federal (7621)		More images
Harbour Air Hangar, Building T-018 at the Vancouver International Airport	4670 Cowley Crescent; Richmond BC	49°10′49″N 123°09′58″W	Federal (16101)		More images
Ida Steves House	4431 Steveston Highway; Richmond BC	49°08′03″N 123°11′38″W	Richmond municipality (2606)		Upload Photo
London Farmhouse	6511 Dyke Road; Richmond BC	49°06′50″N 123°09′04″W	Richmond municipality (2386)		Upload Photo
Martial Arts Centre	4251 Moncton Street; Richmond BC	49°07′34″N 123°10′37″W	Richmond municipality (2605)		More images
McKinney House	6471 Dyke Road; Richmond BC	49°06′54″N 123°09′11″W	Richmond municipality (2387)		Upload Photo
Minoru Chapel	7191 Granville Avenue; Richmond BC	49°10′02″N 123°08′46″W	Richmond municipality (2367)		More images
No. 1 Road Pumpstation	No. 1 Road; Richmond BC	49°07′25″N 123°10′52″W	Richmond municipality (2395)		More images
Northern Bank	3811 Moncton Street; Richmond BC	49°07′31″N 123°10′59″W	Richmond municipality (2365)		Upload Photo
Pierrefonds Gardens	7191 Granville Avenue; Richmond BC	49°10′03″N 123°08′46″W	Richmond municipality (2607)		Upload Photo
Radio Canada Building	9460 No. 4 Road; Richmond BC	49°08′35″N 123°06′50″W	Richmond municipality (2389)		Upload Photo
Rathburn House	5780 No. 7 Road; Richmond BC	49°10′16″N 123°02′42″W	Richmond municipality (11760)		Upload Photo
Ray's Drygoods	3831 Moncton Street; Richmond BC	49°07′31″N 123°10′59″W	Richmond municipality (11759)		Upload Photo
Richmond Cenotaph	6911 No. 3 Road; Richmond BC	49°09′48″N 123°08′13″W	Richmond municipality (2391)		Upload Photo
Richmond Rod and Gun Club	7760 River Road; Richmond BC	49°11′05″N 123°08′17″W	Richmond municipality (2608)		Upload Photo
Scotch Pond	2220 Chatham Road; Richmond BC	49°07′36″N 123°11′53″W	Richmond municipality (2397)		More images
South Arm Presbyterian Church	11051 No 3 Road; Richmond BC	49°07′58″N 123°08′17″W	Richmond municipality (2388)		Upload Photo
Steveston Courthouse	12011 3rd Avenue; Richmond BC	49°07′34″N 123°11′10″W	Richmond municipality (2366)		More images
Steveston Telephone Exchange	12004 No. 1 Road; Richmond BC	49°07′35″N 123°10′52″W	Richmond municipality (2393)		More images
Tilson Barn	10631 Dyke Road; Richmond BC	49°07′00″N 123°06′29″W	Richmond municipality (11758)		Upload Photo
Fish Cannery	4th Avenue, Steveston; Richmond BC	49°07′30″N 123°11′13″W	Federal (15747)		More images
1931 Willoughby Elementary School	7949 208th Avenue; Township of Langley BC	49°08′50″N 122°38′46″W	Township of Langley municipality (6020)		More images
Alex Houston Residence	10735 Allard Crescent; Township of Langley BC	49°11′53″N 122°35′42″W	Township of Langley municipality (6025)		More images
Blair Sugar Maple Tree	5404 216th Street; Township of Langley BC	49°06′04″N 122°37′26″W	Township of Langley municipality (6041)		More images
Campbell Residence	67-20738 84 Avenue; Township of Langley BC	49°09′14″N 122°38′47″W	Township of Langley municipality (18617)		Upload Photo
David Jones Residence	65-20738 84 Avenue; Township of Langley BC	49°09′14″N 122°38′46″W	Township of Langley municipality (18637)		Upload Photo
Dixon House and Barn	6120 Glover Road; Township of Langley BC	49°06′49″N 122°38′35″W	Township of Langley municipality (6049)		Upload Photo
Hassall Residence	9117 272nd Street; Township of Langley BC	49°10′03″N 122°28′23″W	Township of Langley municipality (6024)		Upload Photo
Henry Leaf Residence	5458 272nd Street; Township of Langley BC	49°06′08″N 122°28′16″W	Township of Langley municipality (6018)		Upload Photo
Houston Milk House	10735 Allard Crescent; Township of Langley BC	49°11′53″N 122°35′42″W	Township of Langley municipality (6035)		More images
Johnston Memorial Maple Tree	216th Street and Glover Road; Township of Langley BC	49°07′36″N 122°37′26″W	Township of Langley municipality (6040)		Upload Photo
Karr/Mercer Barn	10735 Allard Crescent; Township of Langley BC	49°11′52″N 122°35′46″W	Township of Langley municipality (6034)		More images
McCrimmon Residence	21641 48th Avenue; Township of Langley BC	49°05′21″N 122°37′23″W	Township of Langley municipality (6022)		Upload Photo
Murrayville Community Hall	21667 48th Avenue; Township of Langley BC	49°05′23″N 122°37′23″W	Township of Langley municipality (6050)		More images
Murrayville Pumphouse	21500 Old Yale Road; Township of Langley BC	49°05′27″N 122°37′41″W	Township of Langley municipality (6021)		More images
PY Porter House	4786 217A Street; Township of Langley BC	49°05′21″N 122°37′16″W	Township of Langley municipality (6051)		More images
Saint Andrew's United Church	9025 Glover Road; Township of Langley BC	49°09′59″N 122°34′55″W	Township of Langley municipality (6043)		More images
Saint George's Anglican Church	9160 Church Street; Township of Langley BC	49°10′06″N 122°34′41″W	Township of Langley municipality (6048)		More images
Sharon United Church	21562 Old Yale Road; Township of Langley BC	49°05′23″N 122°37′34″W	Township of Langley municipality (6042)		More images
Trattle Memorial Maple Tree	96th Avenue and Trattle Street; Township of Langley BC	49°10′15″N 122°35′13″W	Township of Langley municipality (6038)		Upload Photo
Willoughby Community Hall	8280 208th Street; Township of Langley BC	49°09′10″N 122°38′42″W	Township of Langley municipality (6023)		More images
Willoughby Methodist Church	66-20738 84 Avenue; Township of Langley BC	49°09′14″N 122°38′46″W	Township of Langley municipality (18636)		Upload Photo
Wilson Memorial Maple Tree	96th Avenue and Glover Road; Township of Langley BC	49°10′06″N 122°34′48″W	Township of Langley municipality (6039)		Upload Photo
Wright Memorial Maple Tree	96th Avenue and Wright Street; Township of Langley BC	49°10′20″N 122°35′24″W	Township of Langley municipality (6037)		More images
Annand/Rowlatt Farmstead	710 204th Street; Township of Langley BC	49°00′54″N 122°39′22″W	Township of Langley municipality (6019)		Upload Photo
