= Canadian Register of Historic Places =

Federal list of historic sites of Canada

- Website type: Online database of historic sites in Canada
- Available in: English; French
- Owner: Administered by Parks Canada
- Website: www.historicplaces.ca
- Commercial: No
- Registration: No
- Launched: May 2004; 22 years ago
- Current status: Online

The Canadian Register of Historic Places (CRHP; French: Le Répertoire canadien des lieux patrimoniaux, RCLP), also known as Canada's Historic Places, is an online directory of historic places in Canada which have been formally recognized for their heritage value by a federal, provincial, territorial or municipal authority. It is administered by Parks Canada.

== Background ==
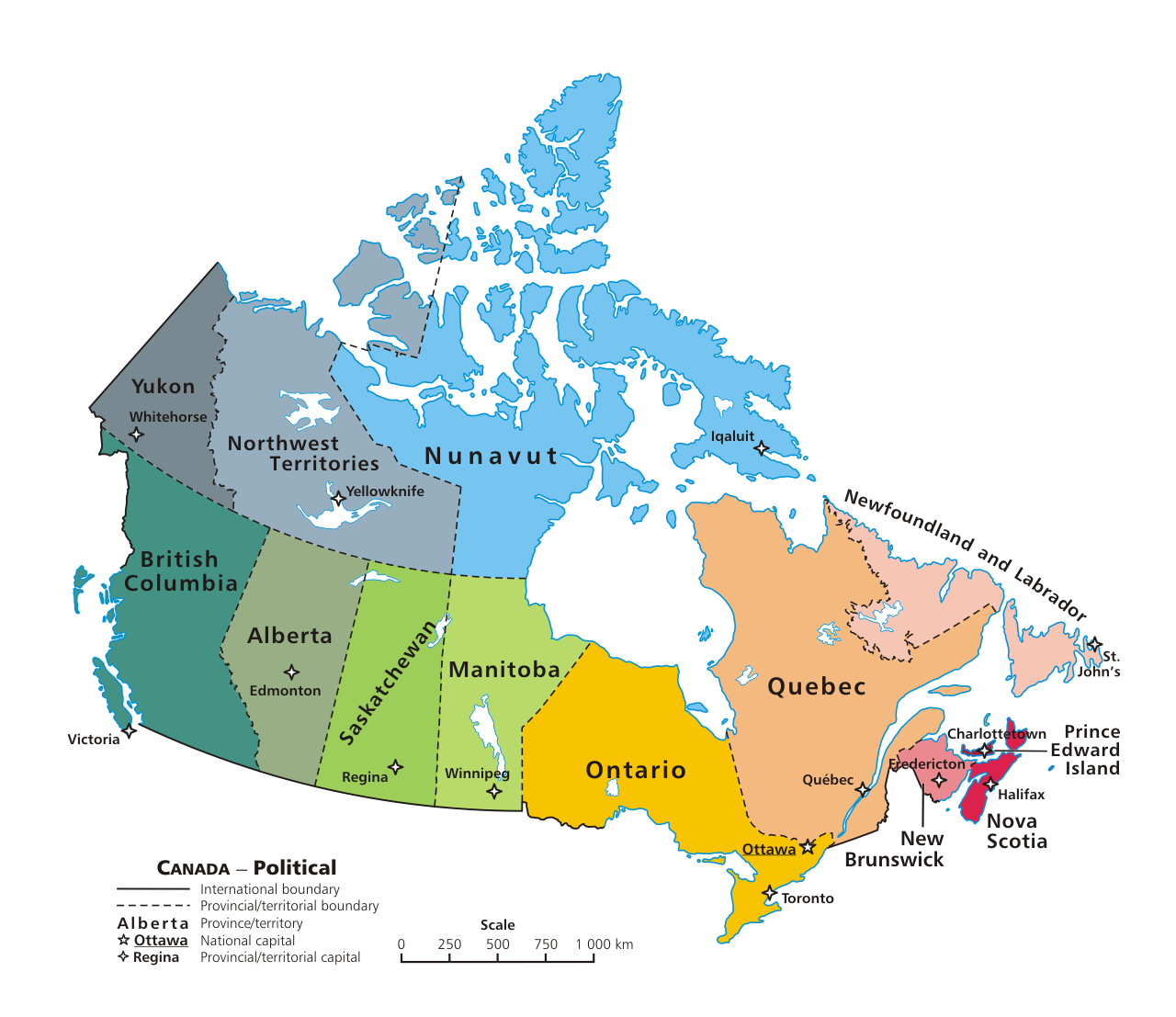
The CRHP contains entries for historic sites located in all 13 of Canada's provinces and territories

The Canadian Register of Historic Places was created as part of Canada's "Historic Places Initiative". Commencing in 2001, the Historic Places Initiative was a collaboration between the federal, provincial and territorial governments to improve protection of the country's historic sites and to "promote and foster a culture of heritage conservation in Canada". The CRHP and the Standards and Guidelines for the Conservation of Historic Places in Canada (a common set of guidelines for the restoration and rehabilitation of historic sites throughout Canada) are the two major tools developed to assist in achieving the initiative's main objectives.

The CRHP was officially launched in May 2004 as a single access point for members of the public to learn about historic sites across Canada. As of 2011, the CRHP included approximately 12,300 of the country's estimated 17,000 designated historic sites.

The directory was designed to be both flexible, in order to accommodate information from the wide range of heritage authorities across the country, as well as uniform, so as to provide a consistent means of searching and a consistent form of documentation for sites regardless of location or heritage designation. Historic sites that have been recognized by more than one level of government, often for differing reasons, are also linked in the directory. For example, the CRHP contains two listings for the Halifax Public Gardens in Nova Scotia (a site designated as both a National Historic Site of Canada and a Municipally Registered Property under the Heritage Property Act), and these two listings in the CRHP are connected in order to highlight the many heritage values that have been ascribed to this particular site.

== Inclusion in the register ==
The Canadian Register of Historic Places does not have its own criteria for inclusion in the directory, but relies entirely on federal, provincial, territorial and local designations of historic sites (reflective of the community-based approach to heritage conservation in Canada). A site must be designated by one or more of these levels of government in order to be eligible for inclusion in the CRHP. The CRHP does not replace existing heritage designation programs already in place across the country, nor does it replace local, provincial, territorial and federal databases, some of which are also available online.

The CRHP is an information tool, not a designatory or regulatory mechanism. Inclusion in the directory does not confer historic or legal status, nor does it impose legal restrictions or obligations. Inclusion also does not affect how the designating level of government manages its own heritage designations or policies.

Given that the CRHP is publicly available on the internet and provides locations details for historic sites, a number of sensitive or sacred First Nations sites have not been included in the directory in order to lessen the likelihood of vandalism and other forms of damage by visitors. The CRHP partner governments are working on other tools through the Historic Places Initiative in order to recognize sites related to Aboriginal peoples in Canada.

== Retirement ==
In late 2025, Parks Canada announced plans to retire the CRHP in spring of 2026, as the existing database has reached "the end of its technological life". There is no plan to replace it. The decision to retire the CRHP has prompted concern from heritage groups across Canada, especially in Nova Scotia where there is no alternative.

== See also ==
- Heritage conservation in Canada
- Lists of historic places in Canada
