= List of National Historic Sites of Canada in British Columbia =

This is a list of National Historic Sites (French: Lieux historiques nationaux) in the Canadian province of British Columbia. As of January 2020, there were 100 National Historic Sites designated in British Columbia, 13 of which are administered by Parks Canada. The first National Historic Sites to be designated in British Columbia were Fort Langley and Yuquot in 1923.

Numerous National Historic Events also occurred across B.C., and are identified at places associated with them, using the same style of federal plaque which marks National Historic Sites. Several National Historic Persons are commemorated throughout the province in the same way. The markers do not indicate which designation—a Site, Event, or Person—a subject has been given. The Rideau Canal is a Site, for example, while the Welland Canal is designated an Event. The cairn and plaque to John Macdonell does not refer to a National Historic Person, but is erected because his home, Glengarry House, is a National Historic Site. Similarly, the plaque to John Guy officially marks not a Person, but an Event—the Landing of John Guy.

This list uses names designated by the Historic Sites and Monuments Board of Canada, which may differ from other names for these sites.

== National Historic Sites ==
Site	Date(s)	Designated	Location	Description	Image
223 Robert Street	1905 (completed)	1990	Victoria; 48°25′45.22″N 123°23′19.92″W	A good example of the Queen Anne Revival Style in domestic architecture.	223 Robert Street
Abbotsford Sikh Temple	1912 (completed)	2002	Abbotsford; 49°3′2.91″N 122°18′27.11″W	The oldest surviving Sikh temple in Canada; the Temple played an important role in the first phase of Sikh immigration to Canada, and represents an adaptation of Sikh religious traditions to Canadian architectural norms of the early 20th century	Exterior view of the Abbotsford Sikh Temple
Barkerville	1862 (founded)	1924	Barkerville; 53°3′57″N 121°31′2″W	The epicentre of the Cariboo Gold Rush, the catalyst for the economic and political development of British Columbia; the town was eventually abandoned and became a ghost town, but restoration commenced in 1958	Exterior view of church in Barkerville
Bay Street Drill Hall	1915 (completed)	1989	Victoria; 48°26′6.75″N 123°21′50.16″W	A two-storey drill hall with Tudor Revival elements, built during the 1896 to 1918 period when over 100 drill halls and armouries were erected across Canada; its scale reflects the dramatic increase in military participation following Canada's performance during the Second Boer War	Bay Street Drill Hall
Begbie Hall	1926 (completed)	1989	Victoria; 48°25′55.99″N 123°19′36.06″W	A three-storey purpose-built nurses' residence; commemorates the growing professionalism of nursing in the early 20th century, and the contribution of nurses to health care in Canada	Begbie Hall
Binning Residence	1941 (completed)	1998	West Vancouver; 49°20′24.91″N 123°11′47.94″W	A small two-bedroom house built for artist B. C. Binning; a very early illustration of the Modern movement in residential architecture in Canada, with a design that had a lasting and important impact on post-war architecture throughout the 1950s and 1960s	Plaque outside the Binning Residence
Boat Encampment	1811 (established)	1943	Warsaw Mountain, Red Rock Bay; 52°7′0″N 118°26′0″W	First visited by David Thompson in 1811, the site was an important trans-shipment point for the Hudson's Bay Company Express fur brigades moving to and from the Columbia River across the continent; the site was flooded by hydroelectric development of the river in 1973, and the marker now rests on a point in the Sprague Bay Recreation Site	The Boat Encampment site now sits under the water of the reservoir created by the Mica Dam
Britannia Mines Concentrator	1923 (completed)	1987	Britannia Beach; 49°37′59.83″N 123°11′59.37″W	A gravity-fed concentrator used to process copper ore for one of Canada's largest mining operations in the 1920s and 1930s; illustrative of the innovation that made the Britannia Mines an important site in Canadian mining history	Britannia Mines Concentrator
Britannia Shipyard	1890 (established)	1991	Richmond; 49°7′15.87″N 123°10′9.22″W	A boatworks and shipyard located along the south arm of the Fraser River part of Steveston's historic "Cannery Row"; noted for its historic association with the construction and repair of salmon fishery boats for Canada's Pacific Coast salmon fishery	Britannia Shipyard
Butchart Gardens	1904 (established)	2004	Brentwood Bay; 48°33′55″N 123°28′10″W	Internationally known gardens, including remarkable Sunken Garden in a former limestone quarry; unique combination of 3 aspects of Canadian gardening history: early 20th-century estate garden, early twentieth century beautification movement, and the Victorian bedding out system	View of the Sunken Garden
Chee Kung Tong Building	1877 (completed)	2008	Barkerville; 53°3′59.97″N 121°31′0.07″W	A two-storey board and batten structure originally used by the Chee Kung Tong organization, a benevolent association for recent arrivals; illustrates the community building among immigrant Chinese labourers and merchants in new settlements throughout Canada	
Chilkoot Trail (Note: Administered by Parks Canada)	1896-1900 (gold rush)	1987	Bennett; 59°46′3.09″N 135°6′46.63″W	A traditional transportation route through the Coast Mountains, connecting the upper Yukon River in B.C. with the Taiya Inlet in Alaska; famous as the route used by thousands of prospectors during the Klondike Gold Rush	Miners climbing the Chilkoot Pass in 1898
Chilliwack City Hall	1912 (completed)	1984	Chilliwack; 49°10′8.4″N 121°57′23.88″W	A small Beaux-Arts style building that served as city hall until 1980; a monument to civic pride at the time of its construction, it is the only pre-1930 town hall in Canada constructed entirely of reinforced concrete	The Chilliwack City Hall in 1912
Chinese Cemetery at Harling Point	1903 (established)	1995	Oak Bay; 48°24′24.09″N 123°19′23″W	A cemetery on the shore of the Strait of Juan de Fuca with the largest concentration of pre-1950 Chinese mortuary features in Canada; a memorial to Chinese-Canadian pioneer immigrants	Chinese Cemetery at Harling Point
Christ Church	1861 (completed)	1994	Hope; 49°22′51.69″N 121°26′38.85″W	A wooden Anglican parish church in the Gothic Revival style built at the height of the Gold Rush era; the oldest church in British Columbia on its original foundation	Exterior view of Christ Church
Church of Our Lord	1875 (completed)	1990	Victoria; 48°25′14.03″N 123°21′51.55″W	A Reformed Episcopal church designed by John Teague; it is one of the finest examples of Carpenter Gothic on the west coast of Canada	Church of Our Lord, Victoria
Church of the Holy Cross	1906 (completed)	1981	Skookumchuck Hot Springs; 49°56′19.06″N 122°24′23.68″W	Renowned example of a Carpenter Gothic mission church, built by In-SHUCK-ch craftsmen; its distinctive profile renders it a landmark in the Skatin First Nation community	Church of the Holy Cross
Congregation Emanu-El	1863 (completed)	1979	Victoria; 48°25′39″N 123°21′40.93″W	A two-storey brick synagogue constructed just 5 years after the arrival of the first Jewish settlers in B.C. in 1858; the oldest surviving synagogue in Canada, and a rare surviving example of a Romanesque Revival style synagogue in this country	The red brick front facade of the synagogue
Craigdarroch Castle	1890 (completed)	1992	Victoria; 48°25′21.31″N 123°20′37.33″W	A mansion of Scottish Baronial design located on a hill overlooking downtown Victoria; built to assert the wealth and stature of the industrialist Robert Dunsmuir, it is a noted example of an eclectic mansion in the west	Exterior view of Craigdarroch Castle
Craigflower Manor House	1856 (completed)	1964	View Royal; 48°27′9.54″N 123°25′17.82″W	A timber-frame building built for the Puget Sound Agricultural Company; one of the key buildings of Craigflower Farm, one of Western Canada's first farming communities and symbolic of the region's transition from the fur trade to settlement	Exterior view of Craigflower Manor House
Craigflower Schoolhouse	1855 (completed)	1964	View Royal; 48°27′9.54″N 123°25′17.82″W	Built to serve children from Craigflower Farm and nearby settlements, the schoolhouse has been preserved virtually intact and is the oldest surviving school building in Western Canada	Exterior view of Craigflower Schoolhouse
Dominion Astrophysical Observatory	1918 (completed)	2001	Saanich; 48°31′11.26″N 123°25′4.9″W	An observatory clad in painted white metal panels and featuring classically inspired architectural embellishments; it is a world-renowned facility where many discoveries about the nature of the Milky Way were made, and it was one of the world's main astrophysical research centres until the 1960s	Detail of the Dominion Astrophysical Observatory front facade
Doukhobor Suspension Bridge	1913 (completed)	1995	Castlegar; 49°19′3.05″N 117°37′46.89″W	A suspension bridge that spans the Kootenay River, built by the Doukhobours; a symbol of Doukhobour culture and one of the few remaining pre-Second World War built resources connected with this group	Doukhobor Suspension Bridge
Emily Carr House	1864 (completed)	1964	Victoria; 48°24′49.68″N 123°22′12″W	A two-storey Picturesque-Italianate style house; associated with Emily Carr, who was born in this house	Front of Emily Carr House
Empress Hotel	1908 (initially completed)	1981	Victoria; 48°25′18.66″N 123°22′4.69″W	A nationally significant Château-style hotel, built for the Canadian Pacific Railway	Part of the front facade of the Empress Hotel
Esquimalt and Nanaimo Railway Roundhouse	1913 (completed)	1992	Victoria; 48°25′47.74″N 123°22′52.42″W	A roundhouse surrounded by railway shops and outbuildings; virtually unchanged since its construction, it is representative of the steam railway era in Canada	E&N Turntable and Roundhouse
Esquimalt Naval Sites	1865 (established)	1995	Esquimalt; 48°25′56.19″N 123°25′54.57″W	Four sites at the heart of CFB Esquimalt: Her Majesty's Canadian (HMC) Dockyard, the former Royal Navy Hospital, the Veterans' Cemetery and the Cole Island Magazine; illustrative of years of naval history, from the era of the British Royal Navy to the modern Royal Canadian Navy	Aerial photograph of Canadian warships docked at Her Majesty's Canadian (HMC) Dockyard
Estate of the Lieutenant Governor of British Columbia	1865 (Vice Regal use established); 1959 (house completed)	2002	Victoria; 48°25′6.47″N 123°20′32.76″W	A 14.6-hectare (36-acre) cultural landscape serving as the residence of the Governors and Lieutenant Governors of the province since 1865	The southeast view of Government House from below, showing the bow window of the Ballroom at left
First Crossing of North America	1793 (arrival of Mackenzie)	1924	Bella Coola; 52°22′43″N 127°28′14″W	Located in Sir Alexander Mackenzie Provincial Park, the site of the farthest point west reached by Alexander Mackenzie during the first journey across the continent of North America north of Mexico	Inscription on a stone at the end of Alexander Mackenzie's 1792-1793 Canada crossing from the Peace River to the Pacific Ocean coast
Fisgard Lighthouse	1860 (completed)	1958	Colwood; 48°25′49.4″N 123°26′51.27″W	The first permanent lighthouse on the Pacific coast of Canada, built to mark the entrance to Esquimalt Harbour	Exterior view of the Fisgard Lighthouse and the Pacific Ocean
Former Vancouver Law Courts	1911 (completed)	1980	Vancouver; 49°16′58.35″N 123°7′13.67″W	Landmark courthouse that serves as an enduring symbol of the justice system in British Columbia, now used as the Vancouver Art Gallery; representative of the rapid growth and optimism of Vancouver at the time of its construction	Exterior view of the Vancouver Art Gallery
Former Victoria Law Courts	1888 (completed)	1981	Victoria; 48°25′33.6″N 123°22′7.68″W	The first major public building constructed by the provincial government after union with Canada, built to house the Supreme Court of British Columbia; previously served as the home of the Maritime Museum of BC; now standing empty and in need of significant repairs.	Former Victoria Law Courts
Fort Alexandria	1821 (established)	1925	Alexandria; 52°37′58.8″N 122°27′0″W	Established as a trading post by the North West Company, it was the last post the company would build before its merger with the Hudson's Bay Company; there are no known above ground remains of the fort	Site of Fort Alexandria in the 1910s
Fort Hope	1848 (established)	1927	Hope; 49°22′42.54″N 121°26′39.51″W	Site of a Hudson's Bay Company post	
Fort Kamloops	1812 (first fort established)	1924	Kamloops	Site of North West Company and Hudson's Bay Company posts	
Fort Langley	1839 (established)	1923	Fort Langley; 49°10′5.16″N 122°34′17.76″W	The site of a Hudson's Bay Company post located on the south banks of the Fraser River; the colony of British Columbia was proclaimed at Langley in 1858	The Fort Langley storehouse
Fort McLeod	1805 (established)	1953	McLeod Lake; 54°59′5″N 123°2′43″W	The site of the first fur-trading post built by the North West Company west of the Rocky Mountains; for two decades after it was built, the fort served as the only liaison between the two sides of the Rockies	Fort McLeod
Fort Rodd Hill	1898 (established)	1958	Colwood; 48°25′56.67″N 123°27′0.42″W	A coastal defence site containing three artillery batteries; representative of the role of the Esquimalt Harbour fortifications in the defence of the British Empire and Canada	Lower battery of Fort Rodd Hill with a tall ship in the background
Fort St. James	1806 (established)	1948	Fort St. James; 54°26′6.19″N 124°15′25.67″W	A restored fur trade post on Stuart Lake, founded by Simon Fraser; from 1826 to 1862 it was the headquarters of the Hudson's Bay Company's New Caledonia District	Fort St. James - field and boardwalks
Fort St. John	1806 (established)	1958	Fort St. John; 56°12′8.84″N 120°49′33.93″W	Site of fur trade posts established by the North West Company	
Fort Steele	1887 (established)	1925	Fort Steele; 49°37′0″N 115°38′0″W	The first North-West Mounted Police post in British Columbia, founded by Superintendent Sam Steele	View of the buildings at Fort Steele
Fort Victoria	1843 (established)	1924	Victoria; 48°25′32.84″N 123°22′6.64″W	Founded by the Hudson's Bay Company, the post became the centre of trade for British territory west of the Rockies; location of the first meeting of the Legislative Assembly of Vancouver Island	Watercolour of Fort Victoria in 1860
Gastown Historic District	1867 (established)	2009	Vancouver; 49°17′3.56″N 123°6′31.8″W	Historic commercial district comprising buildings built mostly between 1886 and 1914; an early Western Canadian city core preserved through the emergence of activist heritage movements in Canada in the early 1970s	The Gastown Steam Clock
Gitwangak Battle Hill (Kitwanga Fort)	1867 (established)	1971	Kitwanga; 55°7′16.27″N 128°1′5.26″W	Remnants of a fortified Gitwangak village, located on the Kitwanga River, associated with legends which recall the epic battles of the warrior Nekt	View of Gitwangak Battle Hill with mountains in background
Gulf of Georgia Cannery	1894 (established)	1976	Richmond; 49°7′29.89″N 123°11′12.17″W	A complex of wooden buildings on a wharf that were used for fish processing and canning, located in what was historically the most important fishing village on the West Coast; illustrative of the development of the fish industry	An exterior view of the Gulf of Georgia Cannery in Steveston
Hatley Park / Former Royal Roads Military College	1913 (completed)	1995	Colwood; 48°26′3.48″N 123°28′20.64″W	A 229-hectare (570-acre) estate, with Hatley Castle, a Tudor Revival-style mansion, at the centre of an Edwardian landscape	An exterior view of Hatley Castle
Howse Pass	1807 (first European exploration)	1978	Blaeberry River and Banff National Park; 51°48′53.53″N 116°46′20.31″W	An early nineteenth-century transportation route through the Canadian Rockies	Black and white photograph of pack horses and a camp in the Howse Pass in 1902
Kaslo Municipal Hall	1898 (completed)	1984	Kaslo; 49°54′38.09″N 116°54′17.68″W	A two-storey, wood-frame town hall with hip roof; the oldest remaining town hall on the British Columbia mainland	An exterior view of Kaslo Municipal Hall
Kicking Horse Pass	1858 (first European exploration)	1998	Yoho National Park and Banff National Park; 51°27′9.07″N 116°17′7.25″W	A major rail and highway transportation corridor through the Rockies with some of the most spectacular mountain scenery in the world	1887 painting of Kicking Horse Pass
Kiix?in Village and Fortress	1000 BCE (circa) (settlement)	1971	Barkley Sound; 48°48′55″N 125°10′30″W	A Huu-ay-aht village and fortress; it is the only known First Nations village on the British Columbia Coast that still features significant extant traditional architecture	
Kitselas Canyon	3000 BCE (circa) (settlement)	1972	Kitselas; 54°36′00″N 128°26′00″W	A canyon settled by Aboriginal peoples for approximately 5000 years; site of two Tsimshian 19th-century villages that controlled trade in the area	Kitselas Canyon in the 1910s
Kitwankul		1972	Gitanyow; 55°16′00″N 128°04′00″W	Gitksan village, named Gitanyow since the 1990s	
Kiusta Village		1972	Graham Island; 54°10′38.3″N 133°1′30.95″W	Former Haida village	
Kootenae House	1807 (completed)	1934	Invermere; 50°31′35.85″N 116°2′43.58″W	The archaeological site of a former North West Company post; the first trading post in the Columbia Basin, and David Thompson's base of exploration of the Columbia River	
Lions Gate Bridge	1938 (completed)	2005	Vancouver; 49°18′55″N 123°8′18″W	A landmark transportation link in Greater Vancouver; the longest suspension bridge in the British Empire when it was built	Lions Gate Bridge
Malahat Building / Old Victoria Custom House	1875 (completed)	1987	Victoria; 48°25′27.87″N 123°22′12.02″W	A three-storey, mansard-roofed, custom house overlooking Victoria's harbour, symbolic of the time when Victoria was the pre-eminent commercial centre on Canada's West Coast	Front and side facades of Old Custom House
Marpole Midden	1892 (excavation)	1933	Vancouver; 49°12′18.92″N 123°8′16.74″W	One of the largest pre-contact middens in Western Canada, containing the remains of a Coast Salish settlement	1908 excavation of Marpole Midden
McLean Mill	1925 (established)	1989	Port Alberni; 49°18′38.88″N 124°49′37.92″W	A rare, surviving example of an early 20th-century sawmill and logging operation, located on a forested 13-hectare (32-acre) site in the Alberni Valley of Vancouver Island	Interior of McLean Mill
Metlakatla Pass		1972	Metlakatla; 54°19′27.06″N 130°27′28.53″W	Site on Pike Island at the western end of a narrow, protected ocean channel at the northern entrance to Prince Rupert Harbour; traditional location of the Northern Coast Tsimshian wintering villages	
Miner's Union Hall	1898 (built)	June 20, 2019	Rossland; 49.076946°N 117.804491°W	Gothic Revival building housed the first union mining local in BC, which fought for fair and safe working conditions, and won an eight-hour workday for BC miners	
Motor Vessel BCP 45	1927 (constructed)	2005	Campbell River; 49°59′48.24″N 125°13′47.27″W	Among the oldest and best preserved surviving examples of a wooden seiner, a type of fishing vessel intimately associated with the West Coast fishery and depicted on the Canadian five-dollar bill from 1972 to 1986	Motor Vessel BCP 45
Myra Canyon Section of the Kettle Valley Railway	1914 (completed)	2002	Central Okanagan; 49°48′13.49″N 119°18′39.14″W	A 9.6-kilometre (6.0 mi) section of railway roadbed comprising a series of high, steel and wooden trestles and tunnels; an outstanding engineering achievement which employed imaginative and ingenious solutions to routing and constructing a railway through mountainous terrain	Myra Canyon Section of the Kettle Valley Railway in 2003
Nan Sdins (Note: UNESCO World Heritage Site)		1981	Gwaii Haanas; 52°5′52.57″N 131°12′58.85″W	Also known as Ninstints or SGang Gwaay Llanagaay, the remains of Haida longhouses and totem poles; a UNESCO World Heritage Site	The Haida village site
New Gold Harbour Area	1852 (circa)	1972	Gold Harbour	Site of Haida village	
Nikkei Internment Memorial Centre	1942 (internment camp), 1994 (memorial centre)	2007	New Denver; 49°59′12″N 117°22′31″W	A memorial centre on the shore of Slocan Lake, on the former site of an internment camp built to house forced Japanese Canadian evacuees from the West coast	View from inside Internment Centre building looking to outside garden
North Pacific Cannery	1889 (established)	1985	Port Edward; 54°11′40″N 130°13′28.94″W	A salmon cannery located between the mountains and the Inverness Passage, comprising a relatively intact assemblage of structures representing over 100 years of the West Coast fishing industry	View of a wharf at the North Pacific Cannery
Orpheum Theatre	1927 (completed)	1979	Vancouver; 49°16′48.35″N 123°7′12.71″W	Known as the "Grand Old Lady of Granville", one of the few movie palaces in Canada to survive to present day in relatively unchanged condition	The sign above the Orpheum's marquee
Pemberton Memorial Operating Room	1896 (completed)	2005	Victoria; 48°25′58.17″N 123°19′39.39″W	An octagonal brick operating room at Royal Jubilee Hospital; a rare surviving example of a surgical facility from the period when hospitals were transitioning from primarily charitable to scientific institutions	Pemberton Memorial Operating Room
Point Atkinson Lighthouse	1912 (completed)	2005	West Vancouver; 49°20′5″N 123°15′42″W	A 18.3-metre (60 ft) high hexagonal lighthouse located across Burrard Inlet from Vancouver; an early example of its type	Point Atkinson Lighthouse as seen from the water
Point Ellice House / O'Reilly House	1864 (completed)	1966	Victoria; 48°26′10.04″N 123°22′37.57″W	A one-storey Victorian cottage that served as the home of Peter O'Reilly, a prominent colonial official; the cottage and its gardens represent one of the finest examples of the British Picturesque aesthetic in Canada	
Powell River Townsite Historic District	1911 (established)	1995	Powell River; 49°52′21.44″N 124°32′53.35″W	A residential neighbourhood of wood-frame houses built to house the workers of the nearby pulp and paper mill; a very well preserved example of a planned, single-industry town from the first half of the 20th century	Aerial photograph of Powell River
Rogers Building	1903 (completed)	1991	Victoria; 48°25′26.05″N 123°22′4.41″W	A small Victorian era commercial building with a Queen Anne Revival shopfront, and intact interior fixtures and decorative features	Roger Building
Rogers Pass	1881 (discovery by CPR)	1971	Glacier National Park; 51°18′05″N 117°31′12″W	A Canadian Pacific Railway route through Selkirk Mountains, instrumental in the development of the main line of the Canadian Pacific Railway into a major national transportation route	A Canadian Pacific Railway freight eastbound over the Stoney Creek Bridge.
Rossland Court House	1901 (completed)	1980	Rossland; 49°4′37.73″N 117°47′44.37″W	A landmark buff brick building located on a steep slope with a commanding view over the surrounding area; representative of a distinctive regional form of Canadian courthouse that emerged in British Columbia in the late 19th century	Black and white photograph of the Rossland Court House in 1909
Royal Theatre	1913 (completed)	1987	Victoria; 48°25′23.64″N 123°21′44.21″W	Built by the Victoria Opera House Company, the theatre served as a venue for dramatic, musical and vaudeville performances, and ultimately cinema; restored to live theatre in 1972, it is one of the finest surviving large-scale legitimate theatres in Canada	Exterior view of the Royal Theatre
SS Moyie	1898 (built)	1958	Kaslo; 49°54′42.12″N 116°54′8.28″W	A late 19th-century, steam-propelled paddle steamer, dry docked since 1958 on the shore of Kootenay Lake; at retirement she was the oldest Canadian-built paddle wheeler in service	Moyie in 2008
Saint Paul's Roman Catholic Church	1884 (completed), 1909 (remodelled)	1980	North Vancouver; 49°18′57.21″N 123°5′16.97″W	A twin-spired, Gothic Revival church located in Eslha7an (the Mission Reserve); the oldest surviving mission church in the Vancouver area	A view of the Mission Reserve circa 1886 with view of spire of church prior to 1909 remodelling
Similkameen Spirit Trail		2007	Hedley; 49°24′7.18″N 120°15′29.2″W	A cultural landscape illustrating over 4000 years of Upper Similkameen history, consisting of three sites linked by an aboriginal trail route: the Tulameen Ochre Bluffs, the Chuchuwayha Rock Shelter, and a series of 27 pictograph sites	The Similkameen River Valley
Skedans		1986	Gwaii Haanas; 52°57′52″N 131°36′29″W	Former Haida village	Skedans in 1878
St. Andrew's Roman Catholic Cathedral	1892 (completed)	1990	Victoria; 48°25′31.5″N 123°21′46.3″W	An imposing twin-towered landmark in Victoria's urban core and an excellent representative example of the Gothic Revival style	Front facade of St. Andrew's Cathedral
St Ann's Academy	1871 (completed)	1989	Victoria; 48°25′8.3″N 123°21′48.95″W	A monumental brick building that served for more than a century as an important educational institute in Western Canada	View of St Ann's Academy and surrounding gardens
St. Roch	1928 (constructed)	1962	Vancouver; 49°16′38.94″N 123°8′49.95″W	St. Roch is a restored auxiliary Royal Canadian Mounted Police schooner drydocked at the Vancouver Maritime Museum; the first ship to cross from the Pacific to the Atlantic by the Northwest Passage	The St. Roch at the Vancouver Maritime Museum
Stanley Park	1888 (established)	1988	Vancouver; 49°18′00″N 123°8′24″W	404.9-hectare (1,001-acre) public park on a peninsula that formerly served as a First Nations ceremonial site and as a British military reserve; epitome of the large urban park in Canada	Aerial view of Stanley park and Vancouver
Stave Falls Hydro-Electric Installation	1912 (completed)	2003	Mission; 49°13′44.12″N 122°21′22.33″W	A well-preserved example of a typical hydro-electric plant of the early 20th century, the core period of hydro-electric technological development, composed of three dams, a powerhouse, a switchyard and associated equipment	The Stave Falls former powerhouse
Tanu	1735 (circa) (settlement)	1986	New Clew; 53°01′30″N 131°46′30″W	Former Haida village in Gwaii Haanas National Park Reserve	Haida totem pole from Tanu, Haida Gwaii
Triple Island Lighthouse	1920 (completed)	1974	Triple Island; 54°15′48″N 130°49′29″W	An octagonal lighthouse on a rocky islet; the prevailing gales and high flood tides made its construction one of the most hazardous tasks in Canadian maritime history	
Tse'K'wa	from 12,500 to 1,000 years ago	August 23, 2019	Fort St. John; 56.272892°N 120.944396°W	archeological site at a place also called Charlie Lake Cave	
Twin Falls Tea House	1910 (completion of first phase)	1992	Yoho National Park; 51°32′35″N 116°31′39″W	A log structure serving as a resting place for hikers; symbolic of outdoor recreation in the national parks and representative of the rustic design tradition	Twin Falls Tea House
Union Club of British Columbia	1879 (established), 1913 (clubhouse)	2016	Victoria; 48.422870°N 123.367180°W	An early gentlemen's club's elegant Beaux-Arts clubhouse	Union Club
Uplands	1908	August 23, 2019	Oak Bay; 48.4485°N 123.3051°W	Early garden subdivision preserves Native American archeology	
Vancouver Japanese Language School	1928 (built)	June 20, 2019	Vancouver; 49.284244°N 123.093631°W	First and largest Japanese language school in the country. Significant for its return to Japanese owners after internment.	
Vancouver's Chinatown	1880 (established)	2011	Vancouver; 49°16′48″N 123°5′58″W	One of the oldest and largest Chinatowns in Canada; characterized by a distinctive "recessed balcony" style of architecture	Vancouver's Chinatown
Victoria City Hall	1890 (completed)	1977	Victoria; 48°25′42″N 123°21′53.46″W	One of the best surviving examples of Second Empire-style public architecture in western Canada	Exterior view of Victoria City Hall
Victoria's Chinatown	1858 (established)	1995	Victoria; 48°25′45.71″N 123°22′4.47″W	The oldest surviving Chinatown in Canada; retains a cohesive assemblage of heritage structures and is dominated by its historical buildings	The Chinese Consolidated Benevolent Association building in Victoria's Chinatown
Vogue Theatre	1941 (completed)	1993	Vancouver; 49°16′47.38″N 123°7′18″W	A theatre designed to accommodate both cinema and live performance; a noted and well-preserved example of the Streamline Moderne style in Canada	Front facade and marquee of the Vogue Theatre
Weir's (Taylor's) Beach Earthworks Site		1974	Metchosin; 48°22′55.28″N 123°32′16.66″W	Pre-contact earthworks on Vancouver Island	
Whaler's Shrine Site		1983	Yuquot; 49°35′28.63″N 126°36′59.84″W	Original site of the most significant monument associated with Nuu-chah-nulth whaling; the shrine was dismantled by an anthropologist in 1905 and presently resides at the American Museum of Natural History	Whaler's Shrine Site
Xá:ytem / Hatzic Rock	3000 BCE (circa)	1992	Mission; 49°9′6.55″N 122°15′1.56″W	Habitation site of Stó:lo peoples	Aerial view of Hatzic
Yan Village Indian Site		1972	Masset; 54°3′49.39″N 132°14′22.25″W	Former Haida village	
Yuquot		1923	Yuquot; 49°36′N 126°37′W	Centre of the social, political and economic world of the Mowachaht/Muchalaht First Nations, and the first point of contact between Europeans and an indigenous people of the west coast of Canada; location of signing of the Nootka Conventions	Ferry arriving at Yuquot

=== Former National Historic Site in BC ===
Name	Established	Disbanded	Notes
Kamloops Junction Railroad Station National Historic Site		1976	Station demolished

== See also ==
- History of British Columbia
- List of heritage buildings in Vancouver
- List of historic places in British Columbia
