= Seaside =

A seaside is the marine coast of a sea.

Seaside may also refer to:

== Places ==
=== Canada ===
- Seaside Park, British Columbia, also known as Seaside
- Sea Side, New Brunswick, a community in Durham Parish

=== United Kingdom ===
- A coastal area in central Scotland; see List of United Kingdom locations: Sb-Sf § Sea
- Seaside, Carmarthenshire, a settlement on the Carmarthenshire coast of Wales

=== United States ===
- Seaside, California
- Seaside, Florida
- Seaside, Oregon
- Seaside, Queens, a section of Rockaway Beach in New York City
- Seaside Heights, New Jersey
- Seaside Park, New Jersey

== Transport ==
- Kanazawa Seaside Line, or simply Seaside, a people mover line in Yokohama, Japan
- Seaside station (LIRR Montauk Line), a former name of the Babylon LIRR station in Babylon, New York
- Seaside station (LIRR Rockaway Beach), the original name for the IND Rockaway Line in Queens, New York

== Music ==
- Seaside (Liane Carroll album), a 2015 jazz album by Liane Carroll
- "The Seaside", a song by Janis Ian from the 1971 album Present Company
- "Seaside", a song by the Ordinary Boys from the 2004 album Over the Counter Culture
- "Seaside", a song by the Kooks from the 2006 album Inside In / Inside Out
- "Seaside", a song by Artigeardit from the 2025 album Æteren

== Other ==
- Seaside (film), a 2002 French drama film
- Seaside (software), a framework for developing web applications in Smalltalk
- Seaside resort, a resort on or near a sea coast
- SM Seaside, a shopping mall in Cebu City, Philippines

== See also ==
- The Seaside (disambiguation)
- Seaside High School (disambiguation)
- Seaside Park (disambiguation)
- Seasider, a tourist train in the South Island of New Zealand
