= Forward Harbour =

Coordinates: 50°29′N 125°44′W

Forward Harbour was a cannery town in the Johnstone Strait region of the Central Coast of British Columbia, Canada, located on the inlet of the same name, which is on the mainland side of Wellbore Channel, to the east of Hardwicke Island. Nearby on the same vicinity on the Mainland, though fronting on other bodies of water, are Jackson Bay to the immediate north, off Sunderland Channel, and Heydon Bay, British Columbia to the east on Loughborough Inlet.

Forward Harbour was named in 1865 for HMS Forward (1855), a Royal Navy gunboat commanded by Lieutenant Horace Douglas Lascelles. Names in Forward Harbour were all in honour of the Lascelles family, particularly Florence and Cust Points, which honour Lady Florence Cust, daughter of the 3rd Earl of Harewood and wife of Lieutenant Colonel John F. Cust.

== See also ==
- List of canneries in British Columbia
- Forward Harbour/ƛəx̌əʷəyəm Conservancy
