= Bazalgette Range =

Mountain range in British Columbia, Canada

- Location within British Columbia

Dimensions
- Area: 146 km^{2} (56 mi^{2})

Geography
- Country: Canada
- Region: British Columbia
- Range coordinates: 50°40′N 125°35′W
- Parent range: Pacific Ranges
- Topo map: NTS 92K12 Glendale Cove

The Bazalgette Range is a small mountain range on the Coast of British Columbia, Canada, to the northwest of Loughborough Inlet in the Discovery Islands region. It is named after Captain George Bazalgette, commander of the Royal Marines Light Infantry in the Colony of British Columbia. The range is a subrange of the Pacific Ranges of the Coast Mountains.
