= Xʷak̓ʷəʔnaxdəʔma/Stafford Estuary Conservancy =

Conservancy in British Columbia, Canada

- IUCN category II (national park)
- Location within British Columbia
- Interactive map of Xʷak̓ʷəʔnaxdəʔma/Stafford Estuary Conservancy
- Location: Strathcona, British Columbia, Canada
- Nearest city: Port McNeill
- Coordinates: 50°43′07″N 125°25′53″W
- Area: 742 ha (1,830 acres)
- Designation: Conservancy
- Established: 2007
- Governing body: BC Parks

The Xʷak̓ʷəʔnaxdəʔma/Stafford Estuary Conservancy, (hwak-wuh-nah-duh-ma) is a conservancy in British Columbia, Canada. It preserves the estuary of the Stafford River on Frazer Bay and the estuary of the Apple River on McBride Bay at the head of the Loughborough Inlet on the North Coast in the Strathcona Regional District. Established in 2007, the conservancy covers 742 hectares of land (538 hectares of upland and 204 hectares of foreshore). It is located approximately 80 kilometres north of the city of Campbell River. There is no road access and there are no settlements within the conservancy.

== See also ==
- Loughborough Inlet
