= St. Vincent Bay =

St. Vincent Bay or Saint Vincent Bay may refer to:

- St. Vincent Bay, British Columbia
- Saint Vincent Bay, New Caledonia
