= Britannia Shipyard =

Britannia Shipyard National Historic Site
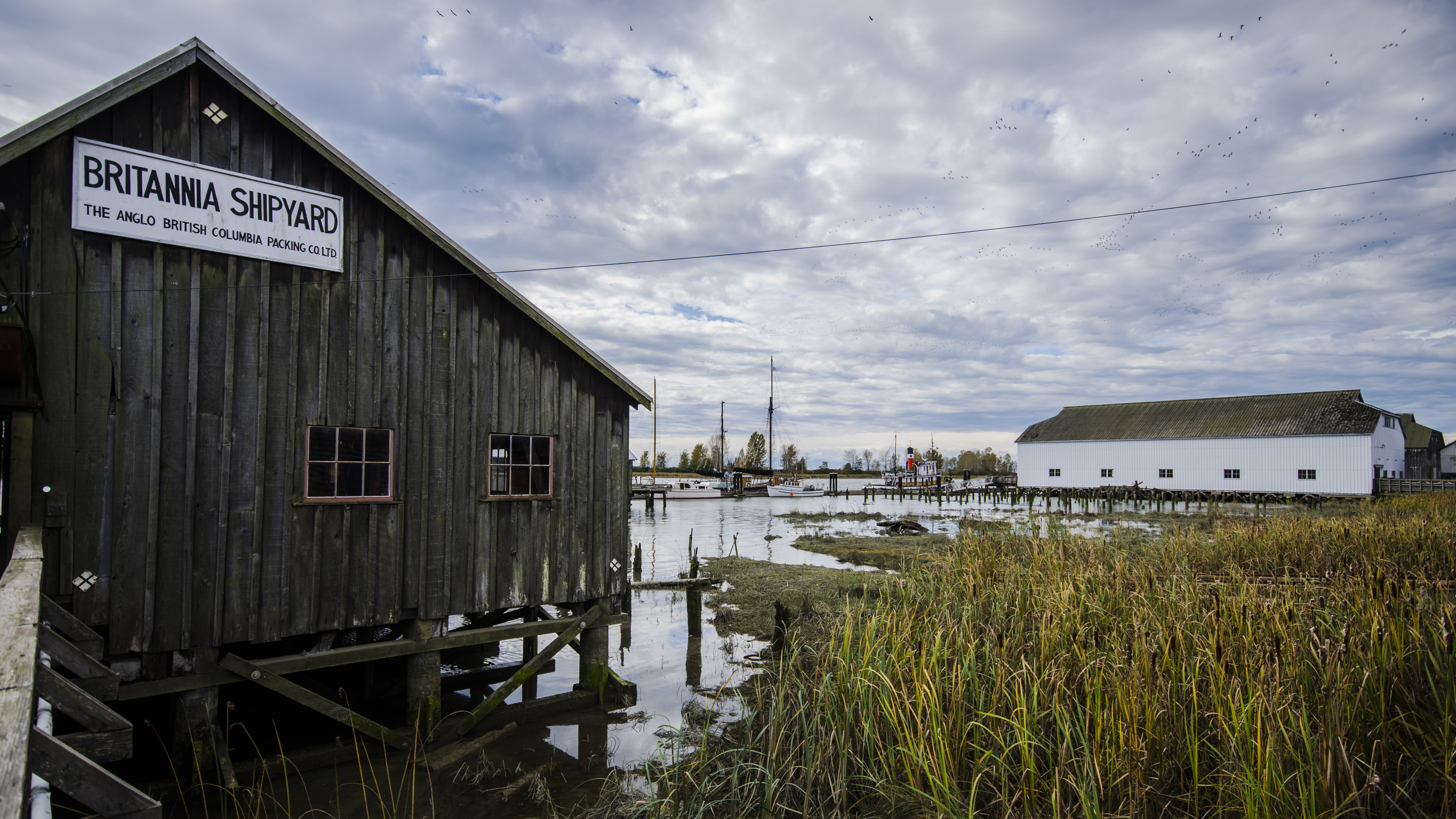
- The historic main Britannia Shipyard building over the Steveston Channel
- Interactive map of Britannia Shipyard National Historic Site
- 49°07′15″N 123°10′09″W
- Location: 5180 Westwater Drive, Richmond, British Columbia, Canada

History
- Founded: 1890
- Original use: Salmon cannery and shipyard

Site notes
- Current use: Maritime museum
- Owner: City of Richmond
- Management: City of Richmond and the Britannia Shipyards National Historic Site Society
- Website: https://www.pc.gc.ca/apps/dfhd/page_nhs_eng.aspx?id=76

National Historic Site of Canada
- Designated: June 10, 1991

The Britannia Shipyards National Historic Site is an 8.14-acre (3.29 ha) heritage park located in the historic village of Steveston in Richmond, British Columbia, Canada. Situated along the Steveston Channel of the Fraser River, the site preserves a interconnected community of canneries, shipyards, residences, and stores that dates back to the peak of the West Coast salmon canning industry.

Designated a National Historic Site of Canada in 1991, Britannia represents not just industrial maritime history, but the diverse, multicultural community of European, Chinese, Japanese, and Indigenous workers who lived and labored there side-by-side.

== History ==
=== Cannery era (1889–1917) ===
The site began in 1889 when the Britannia Cannery was established by the Anglo-British Columbia Packing Company (ABC Packing Co.). It was one of more than a dozen salmon canneries that once lined "Cannery Row" in Steveston, which was then known as the salmon capital of the world.

During the late 19th and early 20th centuries, the facility relied heavily on a seasonal, multicultural workforce. Indigenous and European fishers harvested sockeye salmon from the Fraser River. Chinese laborers worked inside the cannery, processing, butchering, and canning the fish under intense production pressures for low wages and stringent meals. Japanese-Canadians worked as fishers and boatbuilders.

=== Transition to shipyard (1917–1980) ===
As the Fraser River sockeye runs began to decline and canning technology consolidated into larger centralized plants, the Britannia facility ceased canning operations in 1917. ABC Packing Co. converted the massive main building into a boat repair shop and shipyard to service its corporate fleet.

In 1918, a section of the site was leased to the Murakami Boatworks, operated by Otokichi Murakami. The Murakami family lived and worked at the site until 1942, when the forced internment of Japanese-Canadians during World War II stripped them of their property and livelihoods.

Following the war, the shipyards returned to full operational capacity under various owners, including BC Packers. It remained a working shipyard until 1980, adapting from traditional wooden boat repair to modern fiberglass and steel maintenance.

== Preservation and site features ==
The site was donated to the City of Richmond after being empty for years after the closure of the shipyard. Britannia Shipyards is now operated as an open-air museum where visitors can walk along the original wooden boardwalks built over the intertidal mudflats.

=== Boat building and repair buildings ===
- Britannia Shipyard: The original 1889 cannery building structure. Built on pilings over the water, it features historic boat-building machinery, workbenches, and historic vessels undergoing active restoration.
- Richmond Boatbuilders
- Murakami Boatworks
- Winch Shed

=== Residential buildings ===
- Murakami House: The preserved home and workshop of the Murakami family, built over the water. It serves as a exhibit illustrating the daily life, resilience, and internment of Japanese-Canadian fishing families.
- Chinese Bunkhouse: Built in 1915, this is the last surviving Chinese bunkhouse on the West Coast which once housed up to 100 seasonal Chinese cannery workers. The exhibits inside highlight the stark, communal living conditions and the contract labor system of the era.
- First Nations Building
- Japanese Duplex
- Manager’s House
- Men’s Bunkhouse
- Point House

=== Fishing industry buildings ===
- Seine Net Loft: Built in 1955 for the Phoenix Cannery, the building was used to make and repair large nets for fishing. The building hosts an exhibit on innovations in the fishing industry in Steveston.
- Administration Building

== Tourism and community use ==
Today, Britannia Shipyards is open to the public year-round with free admission. It operates as both a static museum and a dynamic, living heritage site. The shipyards host local shipwrights and volunteers who continue to practice traditional wooden boat restoration using historical tools. The park is also a major hub during the annual Richmond Maritime Festival, celebrating local nautical culture, art, and wooden boat heritage.

== See also ==
- Gulf of Georgia Cannery
- Steveston, British Columbia
- List of National Historic Sites of Canada in British Columbia
