= Seaside Park =

Seaside Park may refer to a number of places:

== Municipalities ==
- Seaside Park, British Columbia
- Seaside Park, New Jersey

== Parks ==
- Seaside Park (Connecticut), Bridgeport, Connecticut, listed on the National Register of Historic Places (NRHP) in Fairfield County, Connecticut
- Seaside Park (Marblehead, Massachusetts), listed on the NRHP in Essex County, Massachusetts
- Seaside Park (Ventura) in Ventura, California
