= Redonda Bay =

- Location of Redonda Bay in British Columbia
- Coordinates: 50°15′00″N 124°57′00″W
- Country: Canada
- Province: British Columbia
- Area codes: 250, 778

Redonda Bay is an uninhabited locality that was the site of a cannery owned by Francis Millerd & Co., located on the northwest side of West Redonda Island in the Discovery Islands of the South Coast of British Columbia, Canada.

Redonda Bay was the largest settlement in the Desolation Sound region in the 1920s, and also had a railway logging camp and sawmill. The Redonda Bay Cannery and Cold Storage Plant (later the Redonda Cannery) opened around 1916, and processed salmon, herring, clams, and dogfish throughout its operation. The cannery operated intermittently until its permanent closure in 1948. A store and post office were attached to the cannery.

== See also ==
- List of canneries in British Columbia
