= Garry Point Park =

Seaside public park in Richmond, British Columbia

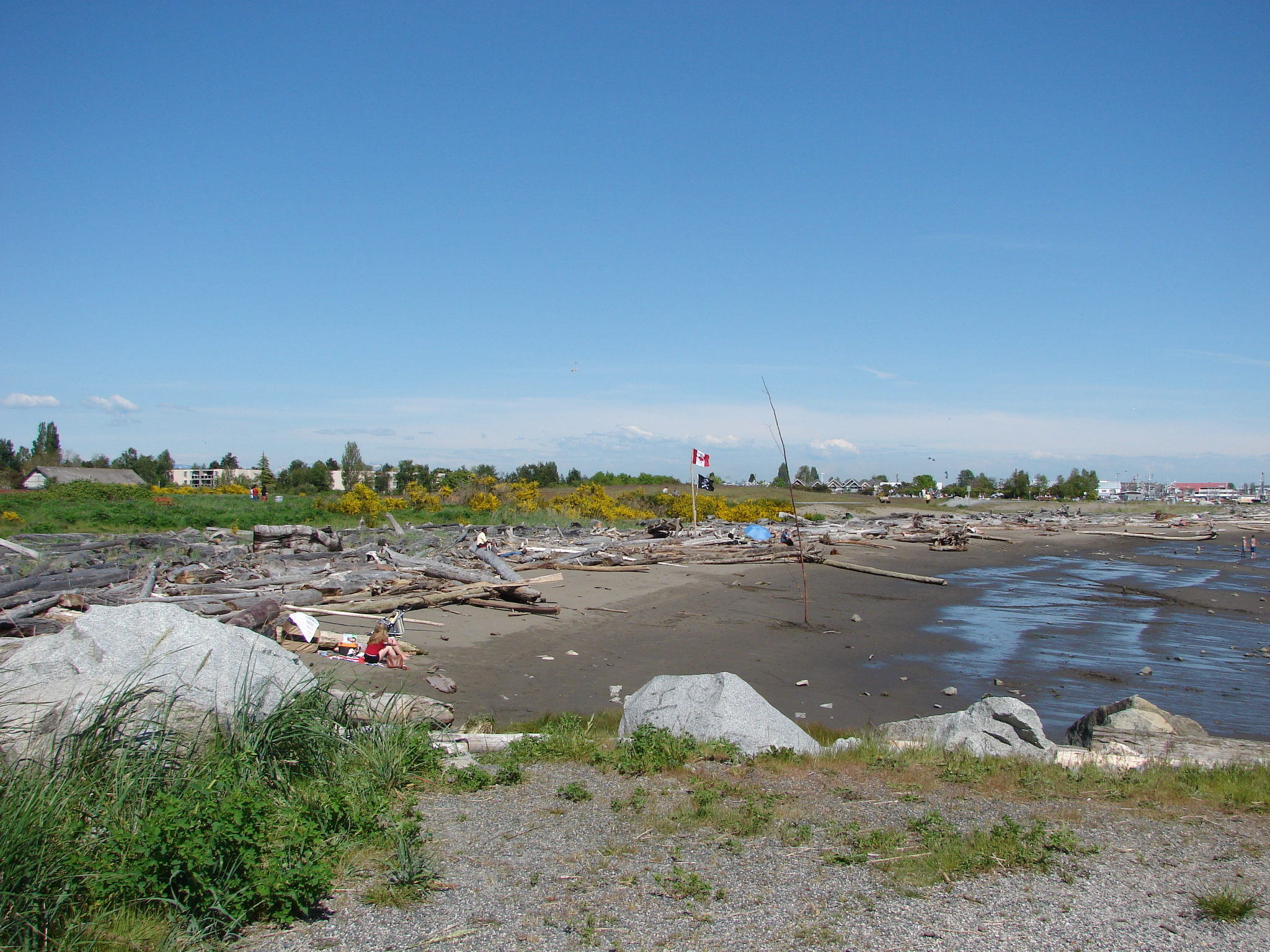
- Beach at Garry Point Park
- Interactive map of Garry Point Park
- Location: Richmond, British Columbia, Canada
- Coordinates: 49°7′33″N 123°11′42″W

Garry Point Park (Hunʼqumiʼnum: q̓ʷeyaʔχʷ) is a public coastal park in Richmond, British Columbia. It is located at the southwestern side of Richmond, near Steveston. The park is next to the Salish Sea, providing views of Vancouver Island and the Gulf Islands. The area was used as a location for filming of the Netflix series Midnight Mass.

== Attractions ==
The park includes Kuno Garden, a Japanese garden, which was established in 1989 by the local Japanese community in celebration of Gihei Kuno, the first Japanese immigrant from Wakayama, Japan. It was donated to the city as a part of the centennial project. The park includes beaches and open areas for activities, such as picnicking and kite flying.

== Gallery ==
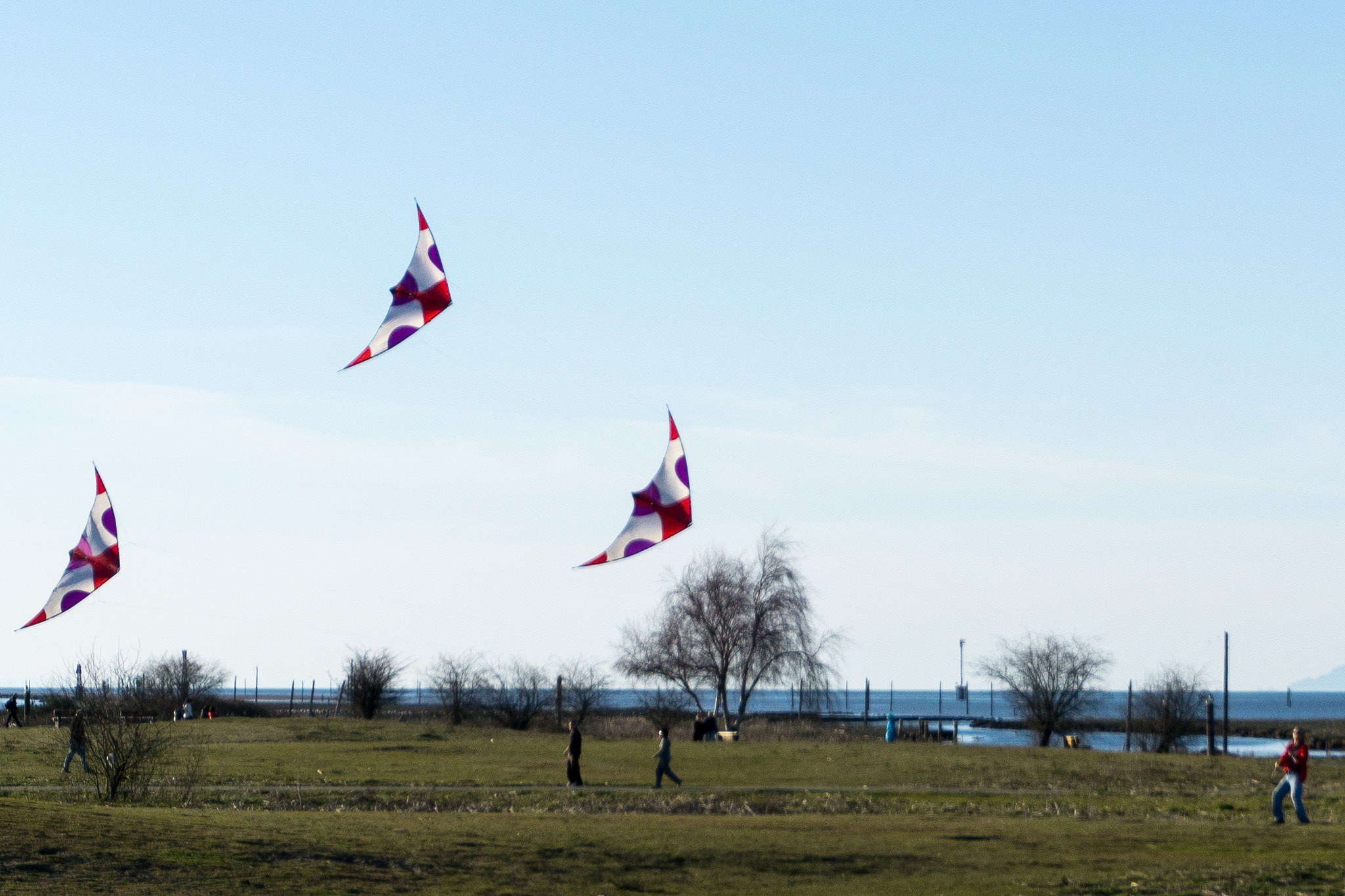
Kite flying at the park

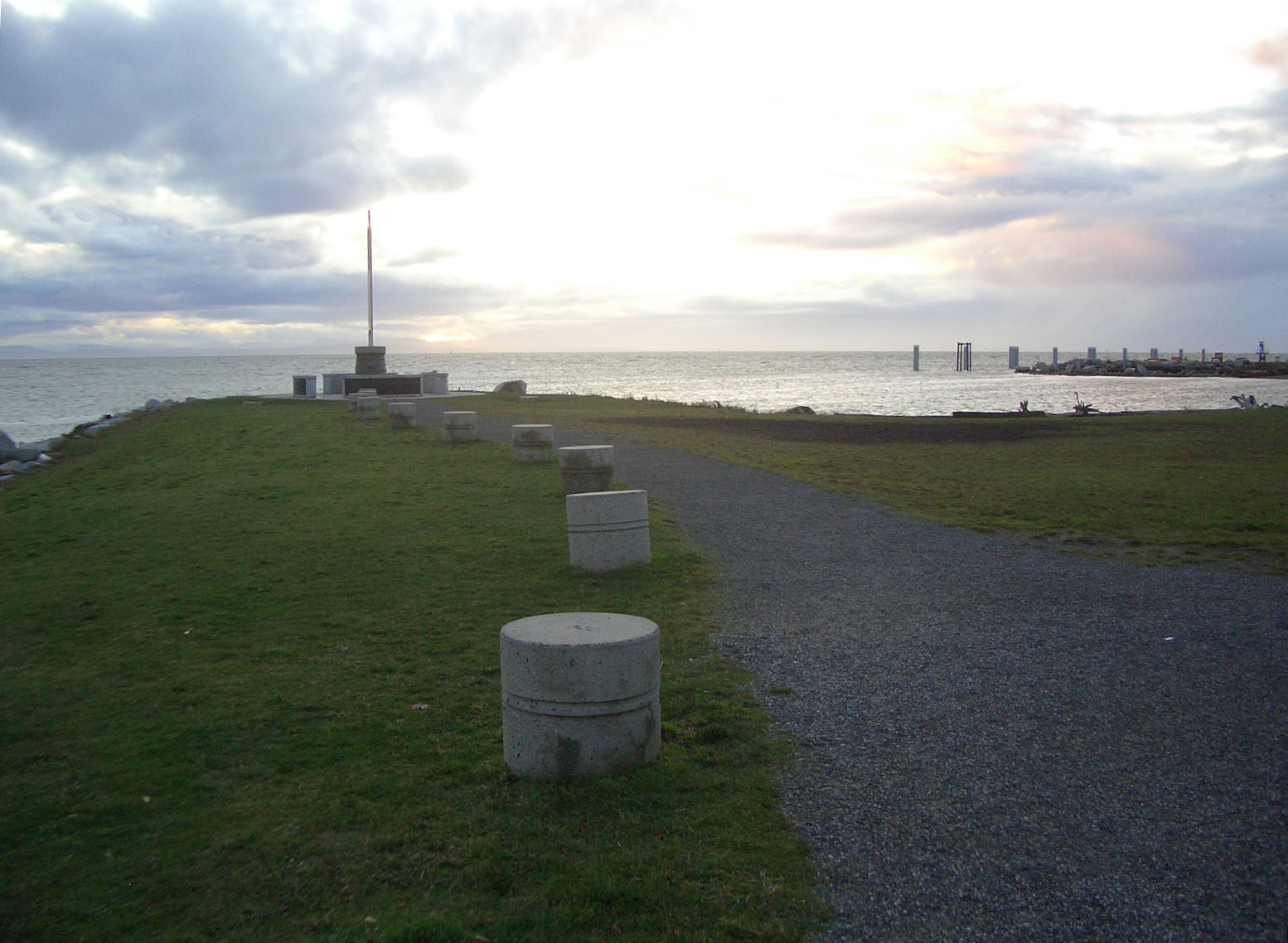
Path next to the sea

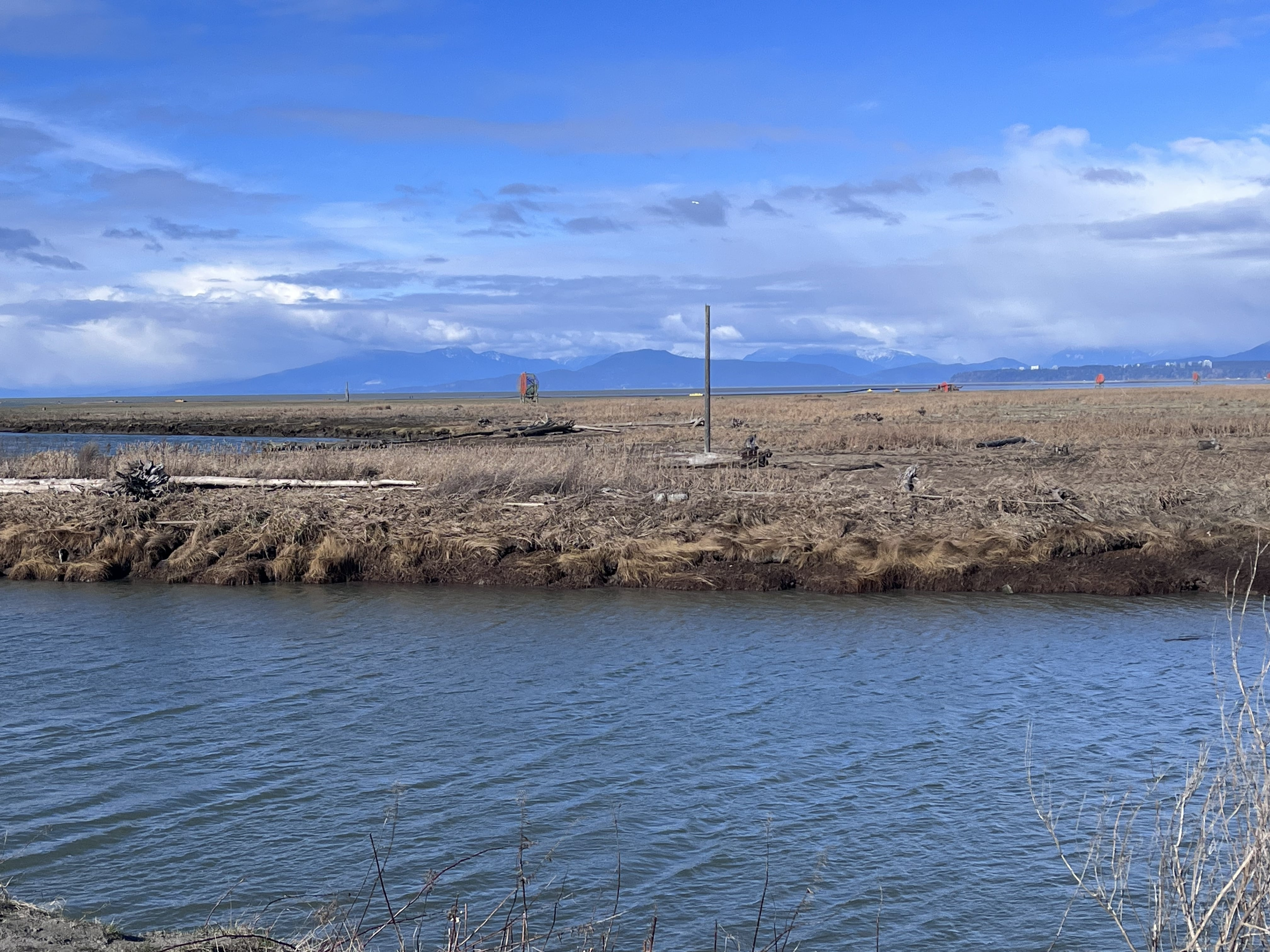
View of nearby wetland
