= List of canneries in British Columbia =

This is a list of canneries and cannery towns in British Columbia, Canada.

== Fish and seafood ==
- Alert Bay
- Alexandra a.k.a. Alexander (Skeena River)
- Arrandale (Nass River)
- Balmoral (Skeena River)
- Bliss Landing
- Bones Bay
- Boswell
- Butedale
- Carlisle (Skeena River)
- Claxton (Skeena River)
- Fort Langley
- Forward Harbour
- Glendale Cove
- Gulf of Georgia Cannery (Steveston)
- Kingcome
- Longview
- Namu
- Porcher Island Cannery (Skeena River)
- Port Essington
- Port Essington (a.k.a. Essington, Skeena River)
- Port Simpson
- Redonda Bay
- Roy
- Seaside Park, a.k.a. Seaside
- Shoal Bay
- Shushartie
- Sommerville Cannery in Prince Rupert
- St. Vincent Bay
- Tallheo
- Toba Inlet
- Vancouver Bay
- Waglisla
- Wales Island Cannery (Pearse Canal)

== Fruit and vegetables ==
- Mission, British Columbia (Empress Foods)
- Royal City Foods Nabob (Delnor)

== See also ==
- List of canneries
- List of salmon canneries and communities
