= Boswell, British Columbia (Central Coast) =

Former cannery town in Central Coast of British Columbia, Canada

Coordinates: 51°21′N 127°39′W

Boswell was a cannery town in the Central Coast region of the South Coast of British Columbia, Canada, located on the north side of Boswell Inlet, an arm of Smith Sound.

Boswell first appeared in the British Columbia gazette on April 7, 1955, listed as a steamboat landing serving the Boswell Cannery, one of 243 on the British Columbia coast. After the cannery closed and steamer service ended, the site was listed as uninhabited from 1987 onwards and is now listed as an abandoned locality.

Boswell is completely uninhabited today, but the wharf from its days as a steamboat landing serving the cannery remains, and the site has water and shelter so is still shown on nautical charts and in sailing guides.

== Name ==
Boswell gets its name from the inlet, which was named in honour of Hazel and Olive Boswell, daughters of a Quebec harbour engineer, St. George Boswell, and granddaughters of Lieutenant-Governor of British Columbia Henri G. Joly de Lotbinière, 1900–1906.

== See also ==
- List of canneries in British Columbia
