= Steveston Museum =

Museum in Richmond, British Columbia

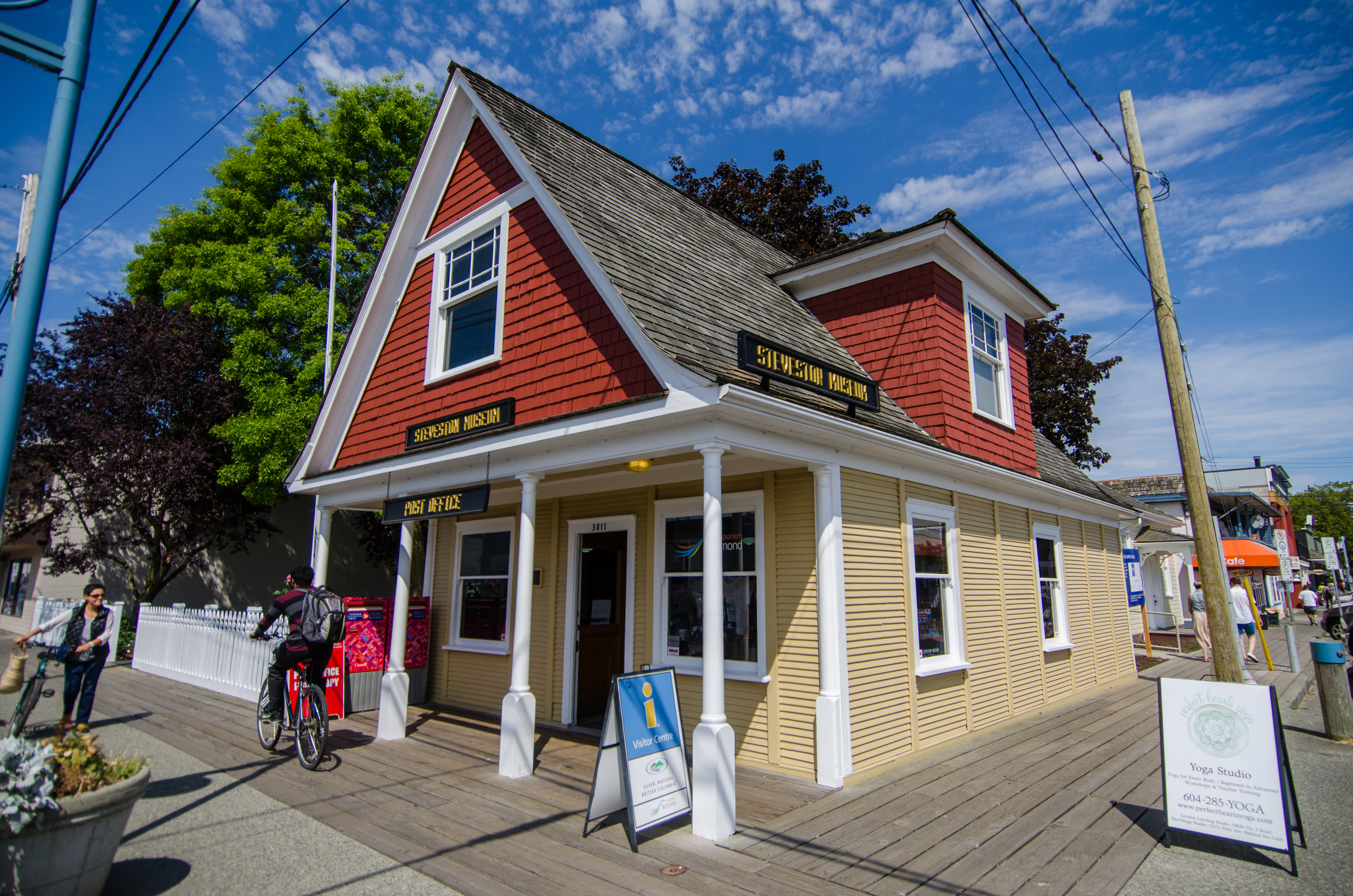
- The Steveston Museum and post office
- Established: 1979 (built 1905)
- Location: 3811 Moncton Street; Steveston, British Columbia; Canada
- Coordinates: 49.1253°N 123.1829°W
- Website: Steveston Heritage Sites

The Steveston Museum is located at 3811 Moncton Street in the heart of the village of Steveston, British Columbia, Canada. The building is owned by the City of Richmond and is run by the Steveston Historical Society. Erected in 1905 during a cannery boom period, the building housed Steveston's first bank.

== Changing Times ==
The prefabricated building was selected by Northern Bank from the BC Mills Timber and Trading Co. catalog and shipped down the Fraser River by barge from New Westminster. It remained a bank until 1963, when it became Dr. J.M. Campbell's medical practice.

In 1979, the building opened as The Steveston Museum and Post Office. Today, it is surrounded by traditional wooden boardwalks and contains exhibits about life in Steveston Village.

In 2010, the Japanese Fisherman's Benevolent Association Building or Japanese Hospital Office, was relocated from its previous location at 4091 Chatham Street to the adjacent space north of the Steveston Museum. As of 2012 the site also hosts a Tourism Richmond information centre.

== The Museum ==
The Steveston Historical Society's mandate is to portray the story of Steveston, a fishing and farming village at the south east corner of Richmond. The main floor of the building displays the Bank Manager's office with early 20th century furniture, business machines and other displays. A functional office and meeting room are located upstairs in the former living quarters of the early bank staff who also doubled as night watchmen and caretakers.

Japanese and Chinese artifacts reflect the presence of these cultures in Steveston and photo displays capture some of the heritage of one of the oldest fishing harbours on the Canadian West Coast.

== The Japanese Fishermen's Benevolent Society Building ==
This building was used as the administration office for the Japanese Fishermen's Hospital, the first hospital to be built in Richmond, and the Japanese School. Built in 1900 by the Japanese Fisherman's Benevolent Society, it was the primary health care provider for the community and had 30 beds, a surgery ward, kitchen and staff dormitories. The facility was important as part of the infrastructure built in response to the typhoid fever epidemics that were an annual scourge of the Steveston Japanese Canadian community during the last years of the 19th Century. The hospital closed after the internment of Japanese Canadians in 1942.

In the years following World War Two, the Japanese Fishermen's Benevolent Society Building was converted into a family residence. It was the only surviving structure of the original cluster of hospital, school and administration buildings. In 2010 the Japanese Hospital Office was moved to become part of the Steveston Museum site where it was rehabilitated to heritage standards. The Japanese Fishermen's Benevolent Society Building was officially opened on June 5, 2015. It now houses exhibits telling the story of the Japanese Canadian community in Steveston. Entry to the building is through the Steveston Museum's post office building.
