= Roy, British Columbia =

Coordinates: 50°31′N 125°32′W

Roy was a cannery town on the South Coast of British Columbia, Canada, located on Loughborough Inlet north of the town of Campbell River and the Discovery Islands.

Roy was named after an early settler, a Mr. Roy, and appeared on the map first in 1919 as a settlement (it is now classed as a locality). Its post office opened May 1, 1896, and closed February 22, 1943.

== See also ==
- List of canneries in British Columbia
