= Longview, British Columbia =

Coordinates: 49°32′N 123°29′W

Longview was a cannery town on the South Coast of British Columbia, Canada, located near Langdale and Port Mellon on the west, mainland side of Thornbrough Channel, a side-channel of Howe Sound separating Gambier Island from the mainland Sunshine Coast. Another cannery town on the same bit of coast was just south, at Seaside Park.

== See also ==
- List of canneries in British Columbia
