= Forward Harbour/Yexeweyem Conservancy =

Conservancy in British Columbia, Canada

Forward Harbour/ƛəx̌əʷəyəm Conservancy
- IUCN category II (national park)
- Location within British Columbia
- Interactive map of Forward Harbour/ƛəx̌əʷəyəm Conservancy
- Location: Strathcona, British Columbia, Canada
- Nearest city: Campbell River
- Coordinates: 50°28′45″N 125°45′59″W
- Area: 306 ha (760 acres)
- Designation: Conservancy
- Established: 2007
- Governing body: BC Parks

The Forward Harbour/ƛəx̌əʷəyəm Conservancy, also known as Forward Harbour/Ƛ̓əx̌ʷəyəm Conservancy is a conservancy in British Columbia, Canada. It preserves a portion of the coast at the mouth of the Forward Harbour, including the Thynne Peninsula and part of Bassborough Bay on the north side. Established in 2007, the conservancy covers 306 hectares of land. It is located approximately 60 kilometers northwest of the town of Campbell River. There is no road access and there are no settlements within the conservancy.

The name of the conservancy is composed of the name of Forward Harbour in English and ƛəx̌əʷəyəm or ƛ̓əx̌ʷəyəm (pronounced kluh-hwa-yum in English), its name in Kwak’wala language or Comox language, as it is on the territory shared by the We Wai Kai, Kwiakah, We Wai Kum and Homalco First Nations. That name is also used for Village Bay on Quadra Island and means "place of chum salmon".

== See also ==
- Forward Harbour
