= The Seaside =

The Seaside may refer to:

- The Seaside (Waterford, Connecticut), a historic building designed by Cass Gilbert
- The Seaside (album), an album by English rock group Cardiacs, or its expanded reissue, The Seaside: Original Edition
- The Seaside EP, an EP by Chicago artist Owen
- Seaside resort, a resort on or near a sea coast

== See also ==
- Seaside (disambiguation)
