= Shoal Bay, British Columbia =

Bay in British Columbia, Canada

Coordinates: 50°27′N 125°22′W

Shoal Bay was a cannery town in the Discovery Islands region of the South Coast of British Columbia in Canada, located on the northeast side of East Thurlow Island, at the bay of the same name.

Once the largest town (1895-1900) on the western coast of Canada, Shoal Bay was a hub for mining and forestry. Gold was mined in the hillsides above the town and the surrounding areas. When mining slowed in the early 20th century there was a shift towards timber and fishing. Shoal bay survived as a small town supporting a school and market until the 1950s when the school closed and families moved to more developed communities such as Campbell River.

Today, Shoal Bay exists only as a small resort, offering moorage at the government wharf, a small pub/cafe, and accommodation.

== See also ==
- List of canneries in British Columbia
