= Seaside High School =

Seaside High School may refer to:

- Seaside High School (California), located in Seaside, California
- Seaside High School (Oregon), located in Seaside, Oregon
