= St. Vincent Bay, British Columbia =

Coordinates: 49°49′N 124°05′W

St. Vincent Bay was a cannery town on the South Coast of British Columbia, Canada, located on the northwest bank of Jervis Inlet near Hotham Sound, and just northeast of the Saltery Bay ferry terminal on the upper Sunshine Coast, and opposite the mouth of Sechelt Inlet. It was utilized as a log sort and booming ground. It has now been transformed into a quarry for aggregate.

== See also ==
- List of canneries in British Columbia
