= Fishing industry in Canada =

In 2018, Canada's fishing industry was worth $36.1 billion in fish and seafood products and employed approximately 300,000 people. Aquaculture, which is the farming of fish, shellfish, and aquatic plants in fresh or salt water, is the fastest growing food production activity in the world and a growing sector in Canada. In 2015, aquaculture generated over $1 billion in GDP and close to $3 billion in total economic activity. Fisheries and Oceans Canada oversees the management of Canada's aquatic resources and works with fishermen across the country to ensure the sustainability of Canada's oceans and in-land fisheries.

== Industry overview ==
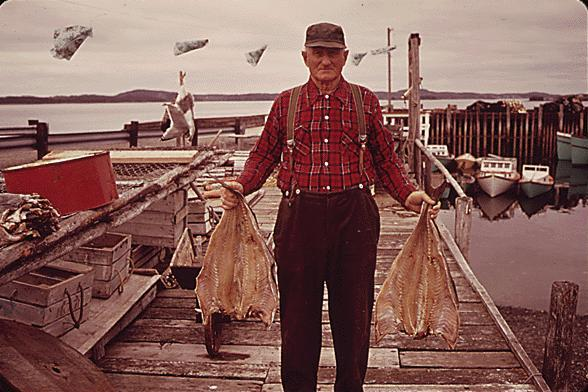
A Campobello Island, New Brunswick fisherman in 1973

Canada is surrounded by the Atlantic, Pacific, and Arctic Oceans as well as the Great Lakes that contain abundant and valuable sources of fish and seafood. The variety of products that Canadian fishermen harvest from these sources are sold within Canada and exported around the world to international markets. In total, the Canadian fishing industry exports over 75% of the products harvested and processed in Canada. In 2015, Canada was the eighth largest fish and seafood exporter in the world, sending products valued at $6 billion to over 130 countries.

The United States is one of the most important markets for Canadian seafood exports and represents 64% of Canada's seafood trade. China (11%), the European Union (10%), Japan (4%), and Hong Kong (2%) are also key export markets for Canadian seafood products. The seafood trade is a sector of the Canadian economy that has a trade surplus, meaning that the value of Canadian seafood exports is greater than the cost of seafood imports coming from foreign markets. In 2016, the total value of Canadian fish and seafood exports was over $6.8 billion compared to the value of imported fish and seafood products that was over $3.8 billion, meaning that the trade surplus of fish and seafood products was roughly $3 billion.

2016 Gross Value of Outputs ($'000)
Commercial sea and freshwater fisheries landings	3,375,592
Aquaculture production	1,347,311
Seafood product preparation & packaging revenues	6,624,271

2016 Employment (number of persons)
Commercial fish harvesters and crew	43,342
Aquaculture	3,340
Seafood product preparation & packaging	28,718

Commercial Sea-fisheries Landings by Species Groups and Region, 2016
	Atlantic	Pacific	Canada
Total Volume of Landings (metric tonnes)	665,182	182,983	848,165
Groundfish	86,480	119,767	206,247
Pelagics	167,751	48,967	216,718
Shellfish	394,767	14,249	409,016
Other	16,185	0	16,185
Total Value of Landings ($'000)	2,949,702	351,670	3,301,372
Groundfish	221,360	152,007	373,367
Pelagics	114,010	87,606	201,616
Shellfish	2,598,937	112,057	2,710,994
Other	15,396	0	15,396

== Regional overview ==
The 3 primary regions for fishing and aquaculture in Canada are the Atlantic region, the Pacific region, and the Inland or Central region that includes the Great Lakes and Hudson's Bay. The breakdown of the basic statistics for commercial sea and freshwater fisheries and aquaculture from 2016, as well as the information about Canada's recreational fisheries from 2010, can be found below.

Landings and Production Statistics for Commercial Sea and Freshwater Fisheries, 2016
	Pacific	Inland	Atlantic	Canada
Number of registered fishing vessels	2,427	114	15,276	17,817
Total volume of landings (metric tonnes)	182,983	30,382	665,182	878,547
Total value of landings ($'000)	351,670	74,220	2,949,702	3,375,592

Landings and Production Statistics for Aquaculture, 2016
	Pacific	Inland	Atlantic	Canada
Number of aquaculture establishments	243	166	508	917
Total volume of production (metric tonnes)	102,325	5,440	90,540	200,565
Total value of production ($'000)	x	32,500	224,375	1,347,311

x - confidential

Recreational Fisheries Statistics, 2010
	Pacific	Inland	Atlantic	Canada
Number of active adult anglers	514,329	1,860,767	912,507	3,287,603
Fishing effort ('000 days fished)	5,868	24,775	12,698	43,340
Harvest ('000 fish kept)	3,998	26,715	31,999	62,711
Direct expenditures ($'000)	614,757	1,341,143	563,533	2,519,433
Direct investments ($'000)	663,214	1,415,029	873,979	2,952,223

== Sustainability ==
Given the abundance of seafood products that can be harvested from Canada's fisheries, the Department of Fisheries and Oceans has established guidelines and procedures to support healthy and productive ecosystems, and maintain the fisheries for future generations. All seafood products that come from Canada's fisheries are required to be thoroughly inspected and comply with product and process standards for domestic and international consumption. These standards also apply to seafood products imported into Canada and ensure that seafood products are safe and properly identified. In order for a fish or seafood product harvested or produced in Canada to be eligible for export, it has to meet defined standards and originate from a registered fish processing establishment.

An important part of establishing sustainable fisheries in Canada is certifying and monitoring where fish and seafood products originate from, where they are processed, and how they are sold to Canadian consumers. Certification of fish and seafood products means that producers must show evidence that their products have been harvested and grown in a sustainable manner. This benefits the fishing industry because it allows them to signal to consumers that the products they buy are coming from legitimate operations and are genuine products that are not inferior quality fish being re-labelled.

Traceability is another important aspect of maintaining sustainable fisheries in Canada. Traceability identifies where a product is at any given time, where the product has been prior to its current location, and what has been done to the product since it was caught. Certification and traceability ensure that fish and seafood products harvested from Canada's fisheries comply with chain of custody requirements established by an independent third-party to avoid conflicts of interest between regulators and industry members. These requirements attempt to establish a sustainable management framework that equally incorporates the interests of the fishing industry and government policy makers, and maintains the integrity of the supply chain for fish and seafood products.

In the recent years, the Canadian government has taken steps in attempt to promote sustainable fishing practices, which include such aspects listed above. Though despite these efforts, there are still major challenges facing Canada's fishing industries, including the impact of climate change on fish populations and balancing conservation with economic interests. According to recent findings, within the last six years, the number of healthy fisheries has decreased and most of the management indicators haven't budged. As of 2022, the current health status for 37.1% of Canadian fisheries have been listed as "uncertain".

== International agreements and programs ==
In response to the European Unions's Illegal, Unreported, and Unregulated (IUU) fishing regulations implemented on January 1, 2010, Fisheries and Oceans Canada established Canada's Catch Certification Program to oversee the distribution of catch certificates to Canadian fish harvesters and producers who export seafood products to the European Union. The goal of the European Union's IUU regulations was to identify and prevent illegitimate seafood products from entering European markets. For example, if a fish was caught by an unlicensed fisherman and then sold as a different type of fish, or a fisherman was unable to demonstrate the legitimacy of their product through supply chain traceability, then this product would not be able to be sold in Europe.

The Catch Certification Program provides government certified catch certificates to exporters of fish and seafood products harvested and processed in Canada. The benefit of this program is that Canadian producers and exporters are able to sell their seafood products in countries that have an established IUU frameworks such as countries in the European Union, Japan, Chile, and Ukraine. Essentially, this program tells importers that Canadian fish and seafood products have been harvested and processed in sustainable fisheries, have documentation that shows where exactly the product was during each stage of its processing, and guarantees that the product is genuine and authentic.

== History ==
The fisheries located on the east and west coasts of the North American continent have always been an important resource for the people who live there. The Canadian fishing industry traces its origins back to the first European Settles who arrived in Canada and harvested seafood products for survival and transportation back to Europe. French, English, Spanish, and Portuguese settlers first began fishing off the Grand Banks of Newfoundland in the 16th century.

The American Revolution and Napoleonic Wars increased British dependence on the North American fisheries located on east coast to sustain their troops, and caused the Atlantic economy to grow, and intensified the establishment of permanent communities based on harvesting seafood from the fisheries. The subsequent conflict between the United States and Great Britain during the War of 1812 created tension between British North American fisherman and their New England counterparts who wanted access to the sources of Cod found in the North Atlantic Ocean.

Following Confederation in 1867, Canada's federal government established the Department of Marine and Fisheries to oversee Canada's fisheries and aquacultural resources. The termination of the reciprocity (also known as Free Trade) agreement between Canada and the United States caused several American vessels to be confiscated by the Canadian authorities. The relationship between Canada and the United States during these years following confederation was rocky and uncertain as disputes arose over control and access to the fisheries located in the North Atlantic.

50 years after Confederation, the Department of Marine and Fisheries developed a comprehensive aquacultural program, which although was unsuccessful in the early years of the 1930s, established several permanent facilities in the Atlantic provinces that stocked rivers and sport fisheries.

The Second World War saw the widespread adaption of modern technology and communication devices such as radios, sonar, nylon nets, and hydraulic power equipment to haul in larger catches of seafood products. The fleet of boats and harvesting vessels became more sophisticated with the construction of larger vessels and developing more powerful engines. During this period, the federal government supported independent fishermen by funding the construction of new vessels through a series of subsidies, creating the Fisheries Price Support Board in 1947 to help with fluctuating prices, and extended unemployment insurance to self-employed fishermen.

The period between 1968 and 1984 was a period of constant fluctuation for the fisheries located in British Columbia and the Atlantic Provinces. Due to over-expansion and unstable markets, the fishing industry in Canada was constantly cycling between boom and bust periods that created widespread uncertainty and instability in the affected fishing communities. The government responded by introducing limits on the size and overall number of vessels that could operate in any given fishery, establishing industry-government advisory committees to foster communication between industry stakeholders and government policy makers, encouraged fishermen to form collective organizations (an example of such an organization is the Canadian Council of Professional Fish Harvesters), and introduced fishing quotas and operational zones in the Atlantic region. Although these solutions were effective to some degree, the Canadian fishing industry continued to experience widespread instability and significant crises throughout the following decades.

The Department of Fisheries and Oceans was established in 1979, and has since been responsible for overseeing fisheries management and research, oceanography, and supporting Canada's small-craft harbors.
