= Steveston, British Columbia =

Neighbourhood in Richmond, British Columbia, Canada

Steveston qʷeyaʔχʷ
- Neighbourhood
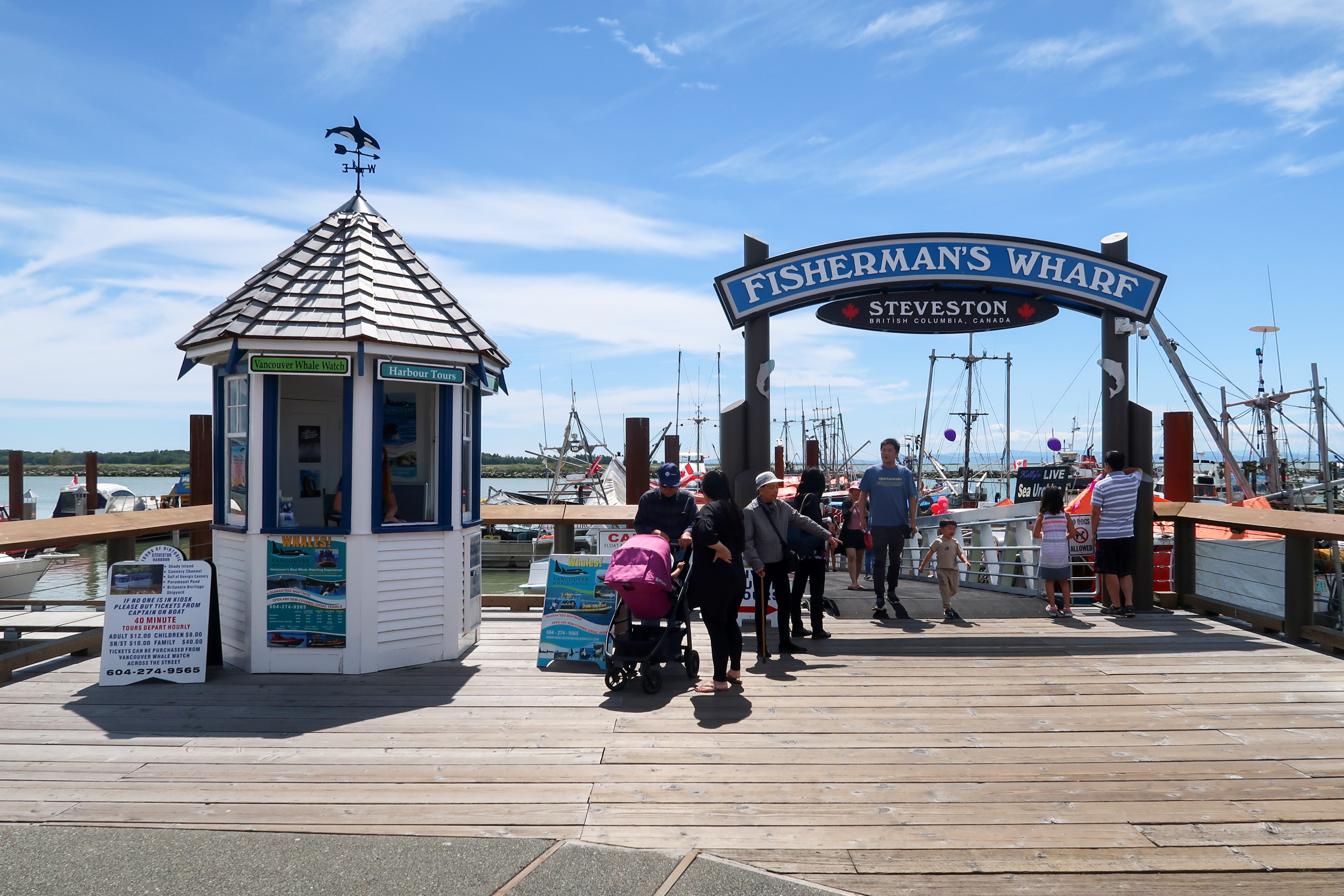
- The Fisherman's Wharf at Steveston in 2018

- Location of Steveston in Richmond

- Location in Metro Vancouver
- Coordinates: 49°07′59″N 123°10′35″W
- Country: Canada
- Province: British Columbia
- City: Richmond

Population (2021)
  - Total: 25,220

Steveston is a historic neighbourhood in Richmond, British Columbia, Canada. The neighbourhood was initially founded as a separate settlement in the 1880s.

On the southwest tip of Lulu Island, the village is a historic port and salmon canning centre at the mouth of the South Arm of the Fraser River. Steveston's boundaries are defined by Williams Road to the north, No. 2 Road to the east, the Fraser River to the south, and the Strait of Georgia to the west. The modern village centre is lined with shops and restaurants in historic 1900s buildings that attract both the film and tourism industries.

== History ==
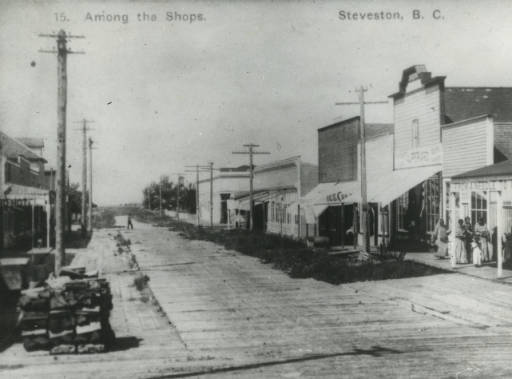
Street scene, Steveston, 1900

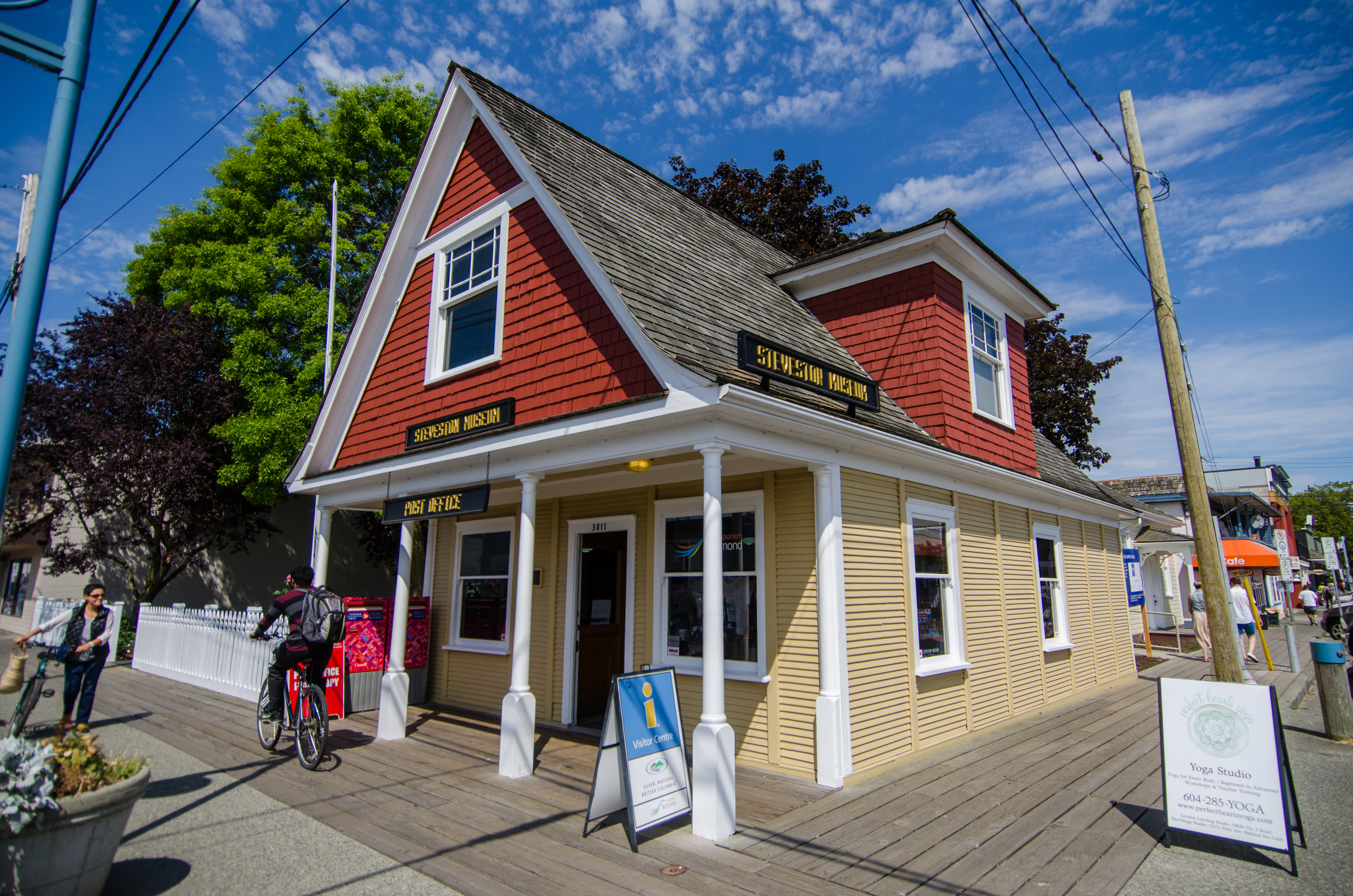
Steveston Museum, 2016

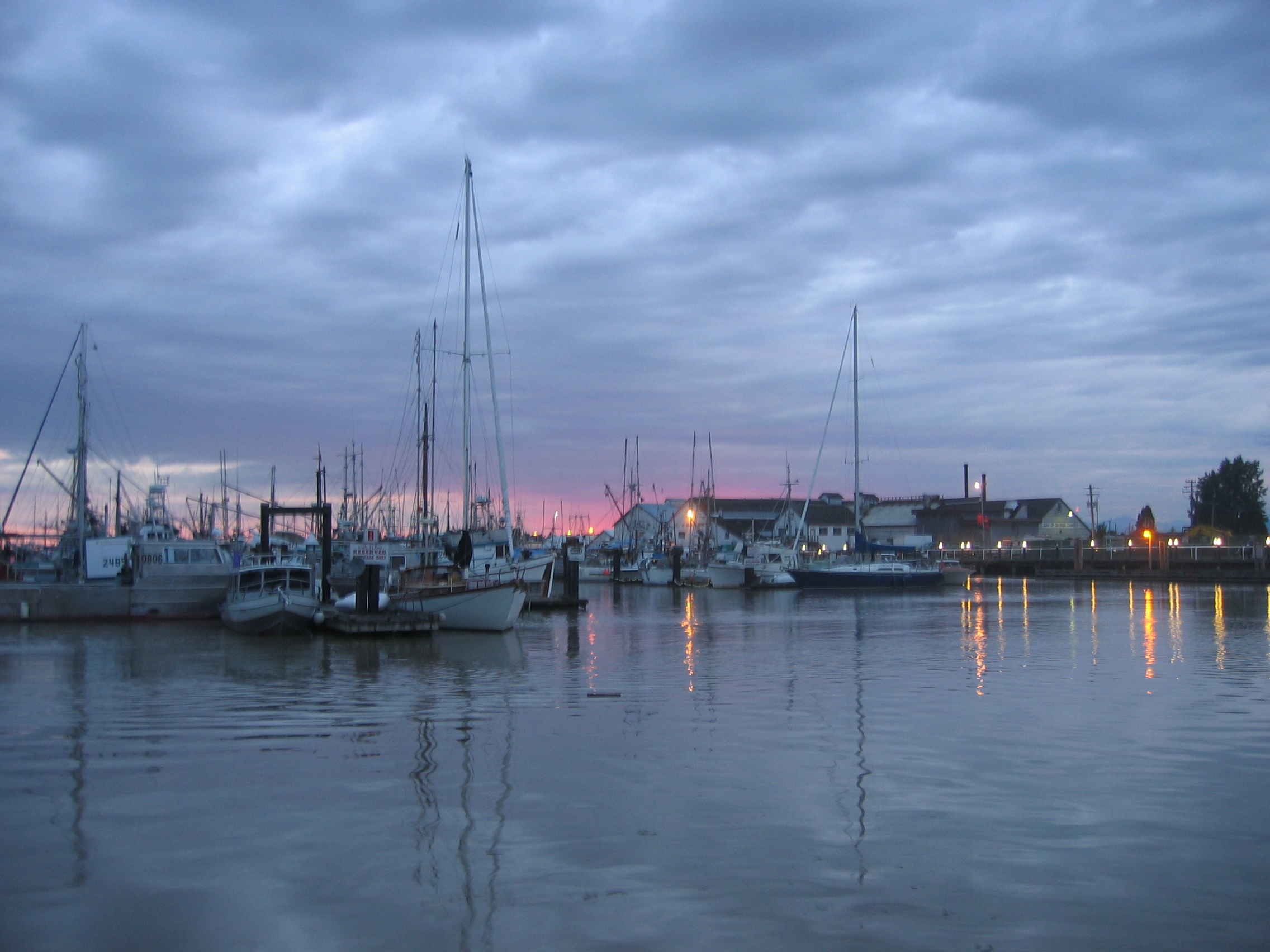
Fishing boats, Steveston marina, 2006

=== Pre-colonization ===
For thousands of years the area that is today known as Steveston was home to the Halkomelem speaking peoples. Specifically, the area is said to be home to at least two Musqueam villages. One known as qʷeyaʔχʷ was located East of what is today known as Garry Point Park. This community was forced out of their homes due to pressure from the canneries who would replace their homes with fishing camps. The second village, qʷɬeyəm, is believed to have been located North of Moncton Street near Railway Avenue. In Richmond, "recently, city council voted to rebuild the historic First Nations Bunkhouse in Britannia Heritage Shipyards--believed to be the only structure of its kind remaining along B.C.'s coast."

=== Pioneers ===
The village is named for Manoah Steves, who arrived with his family around 1877–1878 from Moncton, New Brunswick, via Chatham, Ontario. Born Manoah Steeves, a second cousin of William Steeves, he dropped the second 'e' en route. The family was the first white settlers in the area. The townsite began in 1880 as a crown grant to William Herbert Steves, his son. During the following decade, over 100 individuals purchased land in this original section comprising a grid pattern of 237 small lots. Becoming Steveston in 1889, this area south of today's Steveston Highway and west of No. 1 Rd. was the first subdivision in Richmond. In 1887, London's Landing, at the foot of No. 2 Rd., was also laid out on a grid. New Westminster-Vancouver Island ferries called at Steveston from the early 1860s onward, becoming a Steveston-Vancouver Island run in the 1920s.

=== Early commerce ===
Salmon canning began on the river in 1871 with the first major cannery being the Phoenix, established in 1882 by Marshall English and Samuel Martin. By the 1890s there were 45 canneries, about half of which were at Steveston, giving rise to the alternate name of Salmonopolis. Each summer large numbers of Japanese, Chinese, First Nations, and European fishermen and cannery workers descended upon the village, joining a growing year-round settlement. At the port, sailing ships loaded canned salmon for export. The fishery also supported a significant boatbuilding industry.

Steveston Fire Department existed 1912–1917. Otherwise, the closest firehall was Marpole, half an hour to an hour away, depending upon road conditions. A 1908 fire in the eastern section caused over $35,000 in damages. The 1918 inferno, totalling over $0.5m in damages, destroyed three canneries (the Star, Steveston, and Lighthouse), three hotels (Star, Richmond, and London), and most of Brick Block. The Marpole firetruck broke down on the way. This devastating fire started in a dining/recreational area of the Star Cannery. In 1897, this same cannery suffered the first significant fire in Steveston, requiring extensive rebuilding.

Steveston's aspirations to rival Vancouver as a port ended during World War I. Salmon runs peaking in 1913 was one of many factors. Canning activity slowly declined and finally ceased in the 1990s. The Gulf of Georgia Cannery, built in 1894 was at one time the largest plant in British Columbia. The cannery (1994) and Britannia Shipyard (1991) received National Historic Site designations.

The BCER Vancouver-Marpole-Steveston interurban tram operated 1905–1958. A new building houses the static tram car 1220.

Once a pioneer bank building, the Steveston Museum & Visitor Centre also operates a post office.

=== Steveston's Japanese Canadians ===
Japanese Canadians made up a substantial proportion of Steveston's population before the Second World War. Many worked in fishing and fish processing, while others established boatbuilding businesses, farms and shops. By the 1930s, Japanese residents accounted for approximately two-thirds to three-quarters of the village's population.

Tomekichi Homma immigrated to Canada in 1883 and settled in Steveston. He helped establish the Japanese fishermen's association in 1897 and served as its first chairman. Homma Elementary School was named in his honour.

Japanese residents established their own health services after encountering discrimination in access to hospital care. A Japanese Methodist mission established in 1896 was used as a makeshift hospital during a typhoid outbreak. In 1900, the Japanese Fishermen's Hospital took over medical care for the community and continued operating until 1942.

In 1942, Japanese Canadian residents were forcibly removed from Steveston as part of the wartime removal and internment of Japanese Canadians. Families were dispossessed of their property and were not permitted to return to the British Columbia coast until 1949. Some returned to Steveston and re-established their homes and community institutions.

The community's postwar institutions included facilities for judo and other martial arts. A Steveston Museum historical exhibition documents the Steveston Martial Arts Centre in 1972.

=== Wartime radio monitoring ===
In 1945, the federal Department of Transport established a radio-monitoring station in a former transmitter building on Williams Road in Steveston. It operated as an annex of the Point Grey signals-intelligence station, with operators moving between the two sites. The monitoring service was disbanded following Japan's surrender, and the Steveston station was subsequently dismantled.

=== Post-war development ===
Along with Richmond, Steveston transformed from farmland to residential housing. Since the 1970s, the community, which remains an active fishing port, has enhanced its heritage character and waterfront to attract business and tourism.

Garry Point, at the southwest tip of the community (and Lulu Island), was named in 1827 to honour Nicholas Garry, former Deputy Governor of the Hudson's Bay Company. The company ships used this promontory as a navigational aid to safely enter the Fraser River. From the 1960s to the early 1990s, it was a federally-owned dump site for sand dredged from the river. Levelling the dunes created Steveston's largest park, opened in 1989. The site of the Steveston Fisherman's Memorial, the park was the major host location for the Vancouver-area festivities of the 2002 Tall Ships Challenge. Approximately 400,000 people came to see a fleet of restored sailing ships docked along the river. The financial loss incurred by the event prompted strong criticism from Richmond City Council. A maritime festival continues to be held annually.

In 1990, the Steveston Harbour Authority was established. In 1998, the 44-acre BC Packers cannery site was rezoned residential in exchange for keeping the waterfront portion publicly accessible. Years of controversy followed regarding the zoning of the foreshore buildings.

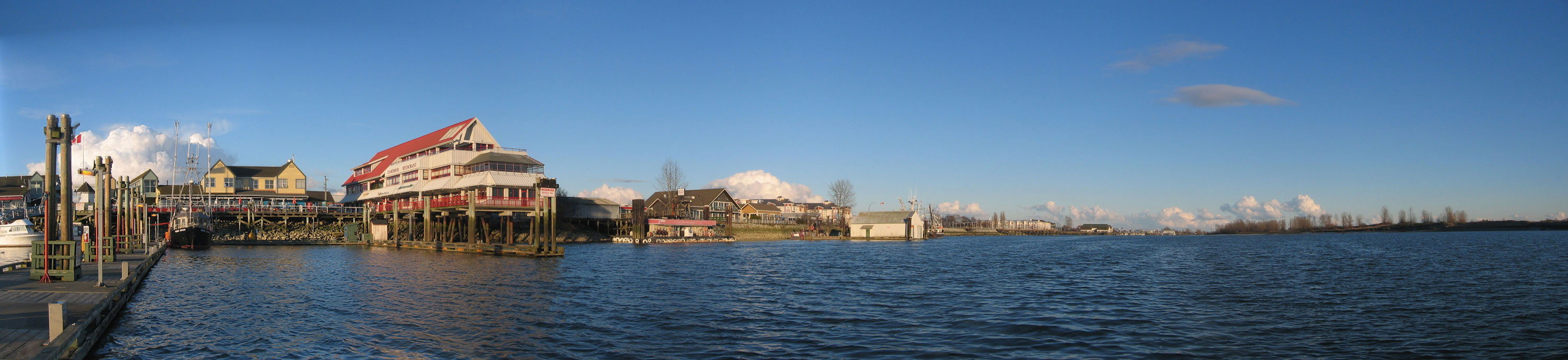
Steveston Harbour eastward from Fisherman's Wharf, 2007

== Demographics ==
The 2021 census found that English was spoken as mother tongue by 69% of the population. The next most common mother tongue language was Cantonese, spoken by 10.1% of the population, followed by Mandarin at 9%.

Panethnic groups in the Steveston neighbourhood (2021)
Panethnic group	2021
Panethnic group	%
East Asian (Note: Statistic includes total responses of "Chinese", "Korean", and "Japanese" under visible minority section on census.)	39%
European (Note: Statistic includes all persons that did not make up part of a visible minority or an indigenous identity.)	43.1%
Southeast Asian (Note: Statistic includes total responses of "Filipino" and "Southeast Asian" under visible minority section on census.)	6.5%
South Asian	4.5%
Middle Eastern (Note: Statistic includes total responses of "West Asian" and "Arab" under visible minority section on census.)	1.6%
Latin American	0.8%
African	0.9%
Other/multiracial (Note: Statistic includes total responses of "Visible minority, n.i.e." and "Multiple visible minorities" under visible minority section on census.)	3.6%
Total population	100%
Note: Totals greater than 100% due to multiple origin responses

== Economy ==
=== Filming ===
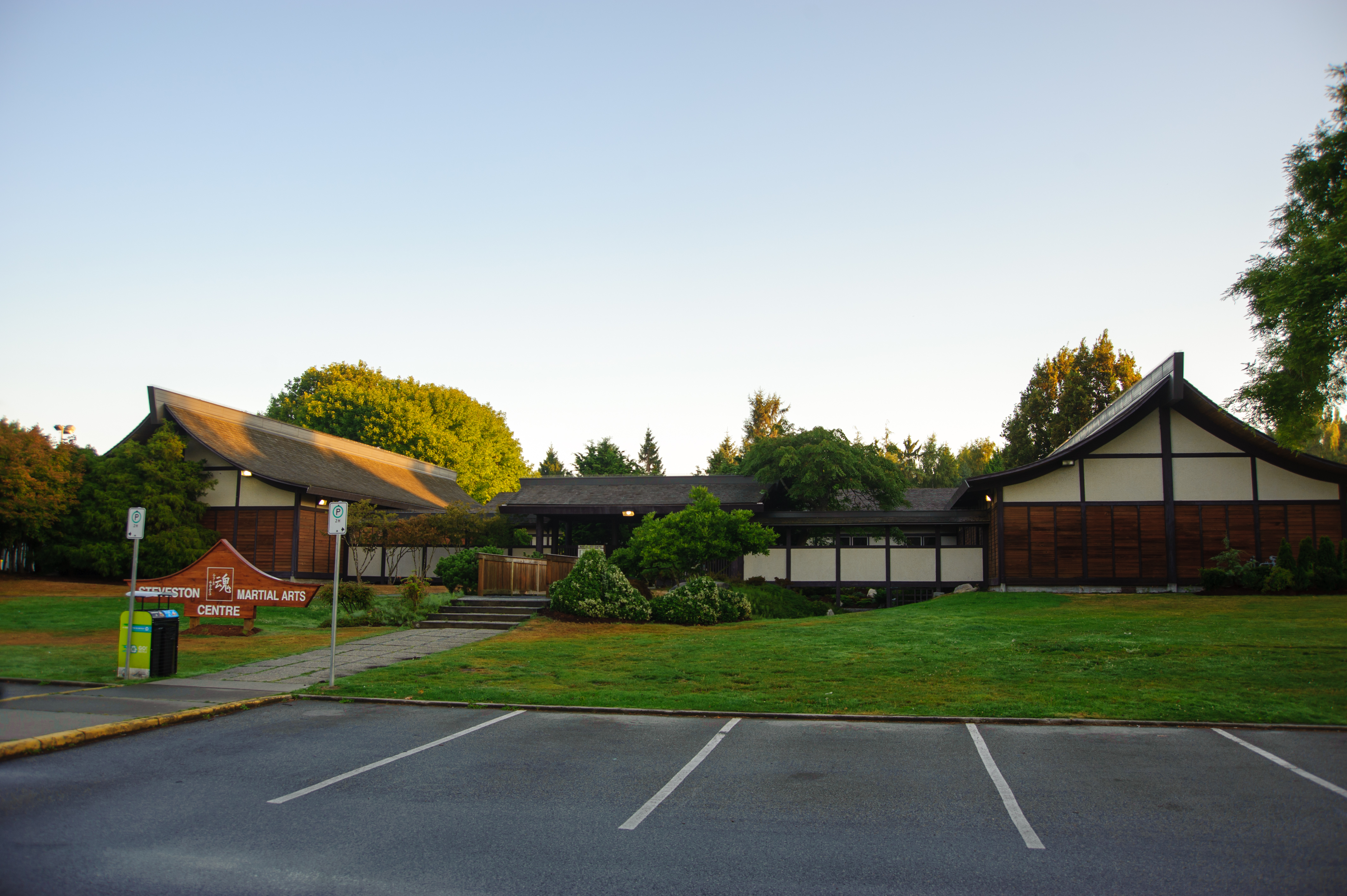
The Martial Arts Centre, a listed building

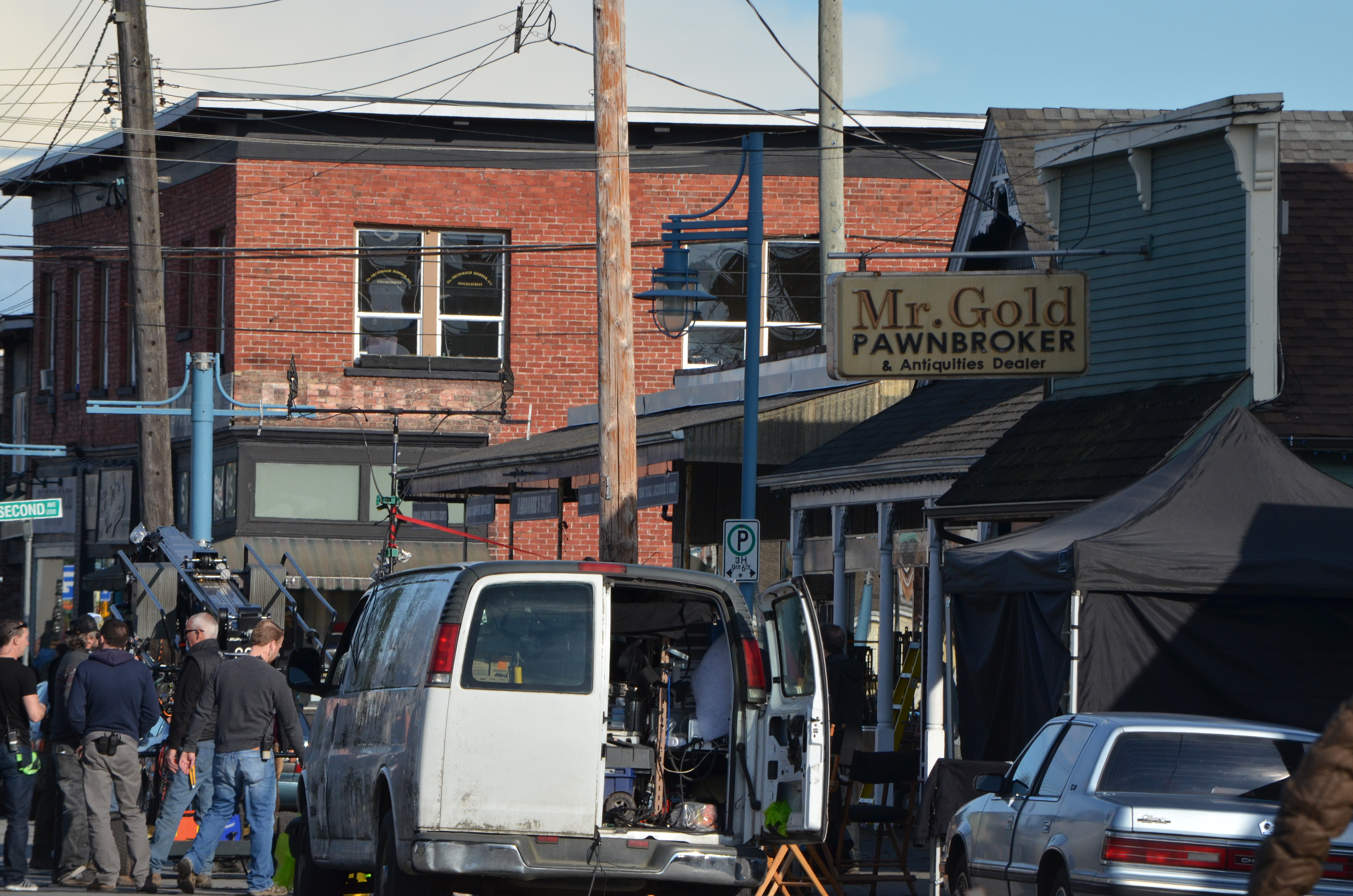
3480 Moncton St., Steveston as Mr. Gold Pawnbroker during filming of Once Upon a Time in April 2015

Steveston is a popular location for filming both movies and television shows, which has included the following:

Period	Production	Detail
1985–1992	MacGyver	51. Jack in the Box (1987), 65. The Secret of Parker House (1988)
1990	Burning Bridges	
1992–1997	Highlander: The Series	as Steveston, Washington
1993–2018	The X-Files	Beyond the Sea (1994), Gender Bender (1994) as Steveston, Massachusetts, Miracle Man (1994), The Post-Modern Prometheus (1997)
1995–2000	Sliders	13. Gillian of the Spirits (1996)
1995–2002	The Outer Limits	54. The Awakening (1997), 125. The Grid (2000)
1997–2007	Stargate SG-1	Nightwalkers (2002) as Steveston, Oregon.
1999	A Cooler Climate	as fictional Steveston, Maine
2000	Scary Movie	
2002	Taken	
2002	Glory Days	
2003	Dreamcatcher	
2004	Kingdom Hospital	
2004–2007	The 4400	3. Becoming (2004)
2005–2020	Supernatural	
2005	Killer Instinct	
2006	Three Moons Over Milford	
2008	Lost Boys: The Tribe	
2007	Traveler	
2009	The Uninvited	
2010	The Twilight Saga: Eclipse	
2010	Charlie St. Cloud	as Marblehead, Massachusetts
2011–2012	The Secret Circle	
2011–2018	Once Upon a Time	as the fictional town of Storybrooke, Maine, the show's main setting.
2012	This Means War	
2012	Diary of a Wimpy Kid: Dog Days	
2013–2014	Once Upon a Time in Wonderland	episodes: "Down the Rabbit Hole" and "Heart of the Matter"
2013–2017	Bates Motel	
2014	Godzilla	
2014	Collar	
2016–	Chesapeake Shores	
2017	Power Rangers	
2018	Midnight Sun	
2018	Overboard	
2018	The Crossing	3. Pax Americana
2018–	Siren	Episode: The Mermaid Discovery (2018)
2018	24. Hope at Christmas	Hallmark Mysteries
2019–	Project Blue Book	
2019–	The Twilight Zone	Episode: Not All Men (2019)
2020	Midnight Mass	

=== Tourism ===
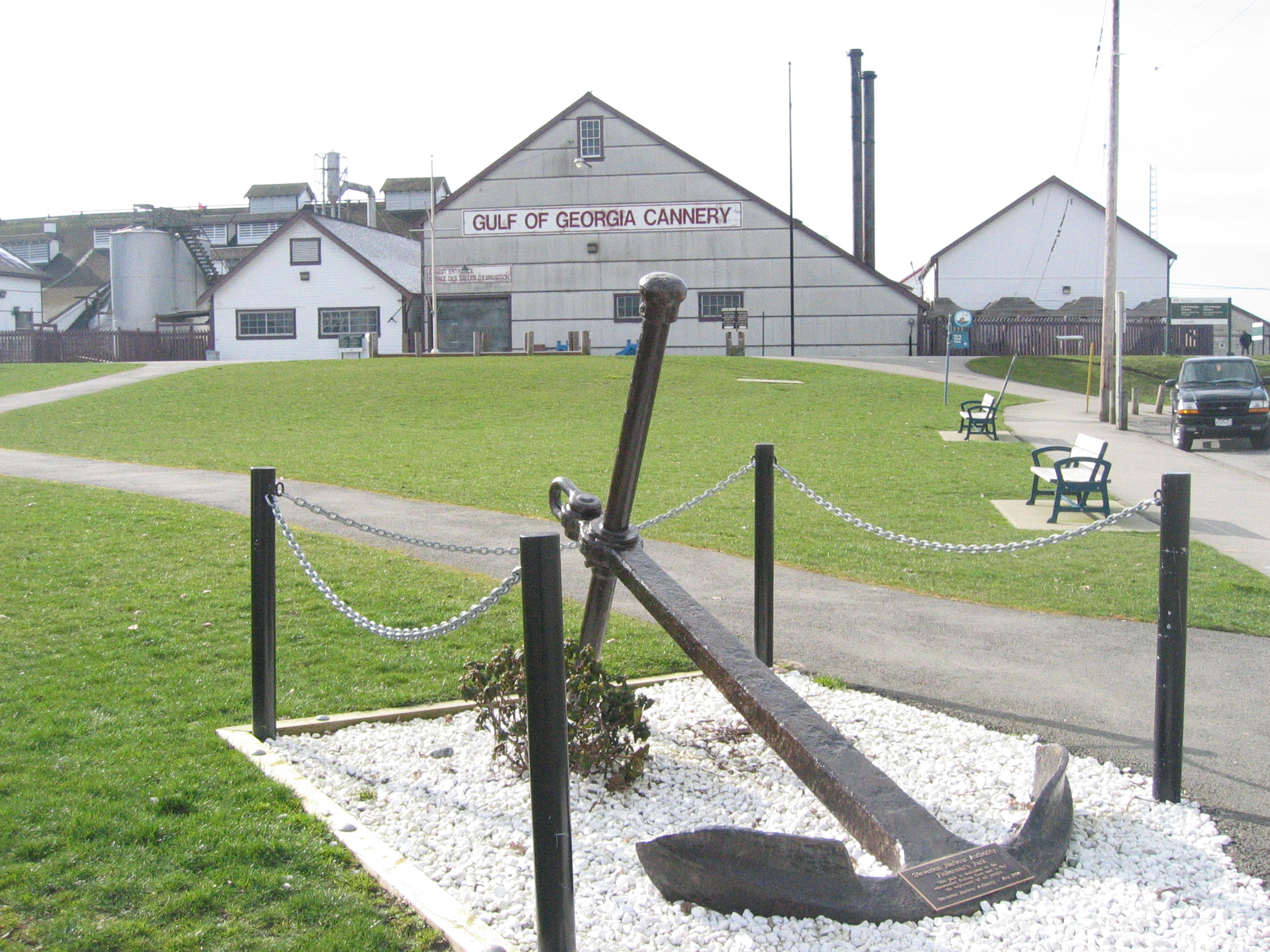
Gulf of Georgia Cannery, 2007

Steveston harbours over 600 fishing boats - Canada's largest fleet. The settlement boasts over 350 businesses and services to accommodate a growing population.

Steveston is also known as "The Gateway to the Orca," being a base for the whale watching industry. Shuttled by boat into the Gulf of Georgia, passengers observe orca (killer whales), seals, eagles and more.

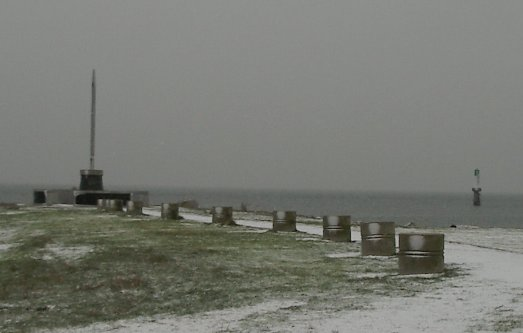
Steveston Fisherman's Memorial, side view

The Steveston Fisherman's Memorial is a freestanding memorial commemorating the lives and deaths of fishermen working out of Steveston, British Columbia. It takes the form of a giant fishing net needle and stands a few metres from the sea at Garry Point Park. The memorial contains a large number of names of fishermen who died at sea.

== Parks and Recreation ==
Parks include:

- Steveston Community Park, which features Steveston Community Centre, Steveston Outdoor Pool, a branch of the Richmond Public Library, Steveston Interurban Tram, and the Japanese Canadian Cultural Centre.
- Garry Point Park, which features Steveston Farmers and Artists Market, and the Richmond Cherry Blossom Festival.

The Steveston Salmon Festival, founded in 1946, is an annual event on Canada Day.

== Education ==
The Steveston area is home to six elementary schools:

- Lord Byng Elementary School
- John G. Diefenbaker Elementary School
- Tomekichi Homma Elementary School
- James McKinney Elementary School
- Manoah Steves Elementary School
- Westwind Elementary School

As well as one secondary school, R.A. McMath Secondary School.

== Notable person ==
- Greg Ng, film editor

== See also ==
- List of canneries in British Columbia
- List of World War II-era fortifications on the British Columbia Coast
