= Jackson Bay, British Columbia =

Coordinates: 50.516°N 125.749°W

Location of Jackson Bay in British Columbia

Jackson Bay is a settlement in British Columbia. It lies on a northerly inlet from Johnstone Strait north of Hardwicke Island. It is within Topaze Harbour, a good anchorage for ships.

There was at least one First Nations village (of the Kwakwakaʼwakw) on the site. Ethnic European settlers arrived from the 1910s onwards beginning with a boat landing location and a general store. Logging and fishing were the main occupations, along with supporting agriculture, until the 1950s when the settlement was abandoned.
