= Glendale Cove =

- Location of Glendale Cove in British Columbia
- Coordinates: 50°40′00″N 125°43′00″W
- Country: Canada
- Province: British Columbia
- Time zone: UTC−07:00 (PT)
- Area codes: 250, 778

Glendale Cove is an uninhabited locality that was the site of a cannery owned by Francis Millerd & Co., located on the south side of Knight Inlet in the Central Coast of British Columbia, Canada. The cannery was located on the east side of the cove. Somewhere in the vicinity was a village of the Kwakwaka'wakw named Zalidis.

== See also ==
- List of canneries in British Columbia
