= 223 Robert Street =

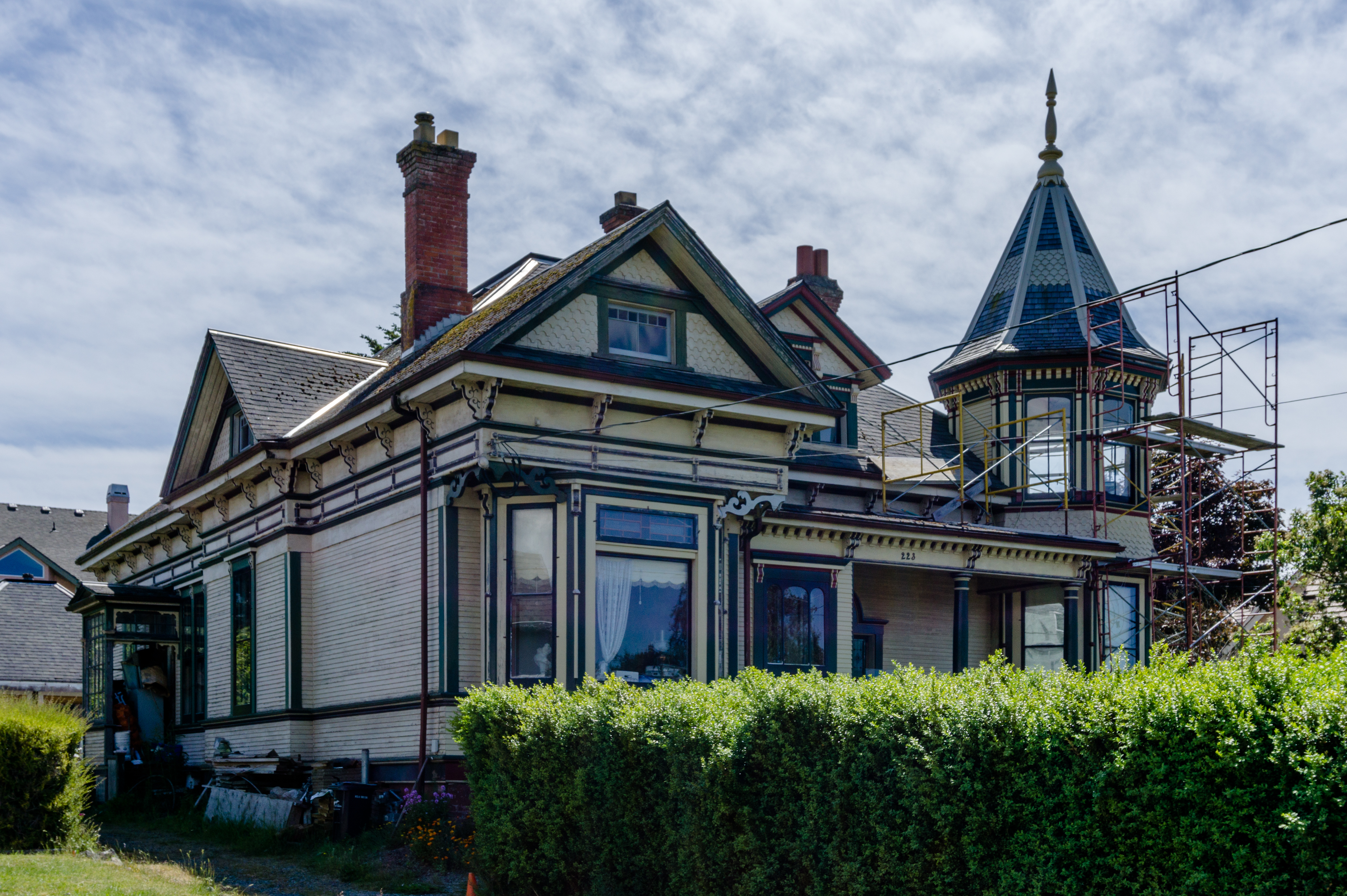
- 223 Robert Street
- Type: house
- Location: 223 Robert Street; Victoria, British Columbia; Canada
- Coordinates: 48.4292°N 123.389°W
- Built: 1905
- Built for: James Muirhead
- Architect: Thomas Hooper and C. Elwood Watkins
- Architectural style(s): Queen Anne Revival

National Historic Site of Canada
- Official name: 23 Robert Street National Historic Site of Canada
- Designated: 16 November 1990
- Reference no.: 88

223 Robert Street, Victoria, British Columbia is a historic house in Victoria, British Columbia that was completed in 1905 and designated as a heritage building in 1990. It is a good example of the Queen Anne Style architecture.

The house was badly damaged by fire on the night of April 28/29, 2020, but is being restored.

== See also ==
- List of historic places in Victoria, British Columbia
