= Loughborough Inlet =

Inlet in British Columbia, Canada

Coordinates: 50°34′45″N 125°32′28″W

Loughborough Inlet is one of the lesser principal inlets of the British Columbia Coast. It penetrates the Coast Mountains on the north side of the Discovery Islands archipelago, running about 35 km (22 mi) from its head at the mouth of the Stafford River to Chancellor Channel and Cordero Channel, which are on the north side of West Thurlow Island. A further 14 km (8.7 mi) west along Chancellor Channel is Johnstone Strait.

Loughborough Inlet averages about 2.5 km (1.6 mi) wide. Its mouth marks the east end of Chancellor Channel and the west end of Cordero Channel. The mouth of Loughborough Inlet is about midway between the mouths of Bute Inlet, to the east, and Knight Inlet, to the west.

Due to the arrangement of the mountain ranges separating the inlets, the upper end of Loughborough Inlet is only about 10 km (6.2 mi) from the nearest waters of Knight Inlet, but much further from Bute Inlet.

== History ==
James Johnstone, one of George Vancouver's lieutenants during his 1791–95 expedition, first charted the inlet in 1792. Loughborough Inlet was the site of a large cannery town at Roy, which remains on the map as a locality.

== See also ==
- List of canneries in British Columbia
