= Seaside Park, British Columbia =

Locality in British Columbia, Canada

Coordinates: 49°31′N 123°29′W

Seaside Park, aka Seaside, was a cannery town on the South Coast of British Columbia, Canada, located near Langdale and Port Mellon on the west, mainland side of Thornbrough Channel, a side-channel of Howe Sound separating Gambier Island from the mainland Sunshine Coast. Another cannery town nearby was Longview, just to the north along the same coastline.

== See also ==
- List of canneries in British Columbia
