= Gulf of Georgia Cannery =

National Historic Site located in Richmond, British Columbia

Gulf of Georgia Cannery National Historic Site
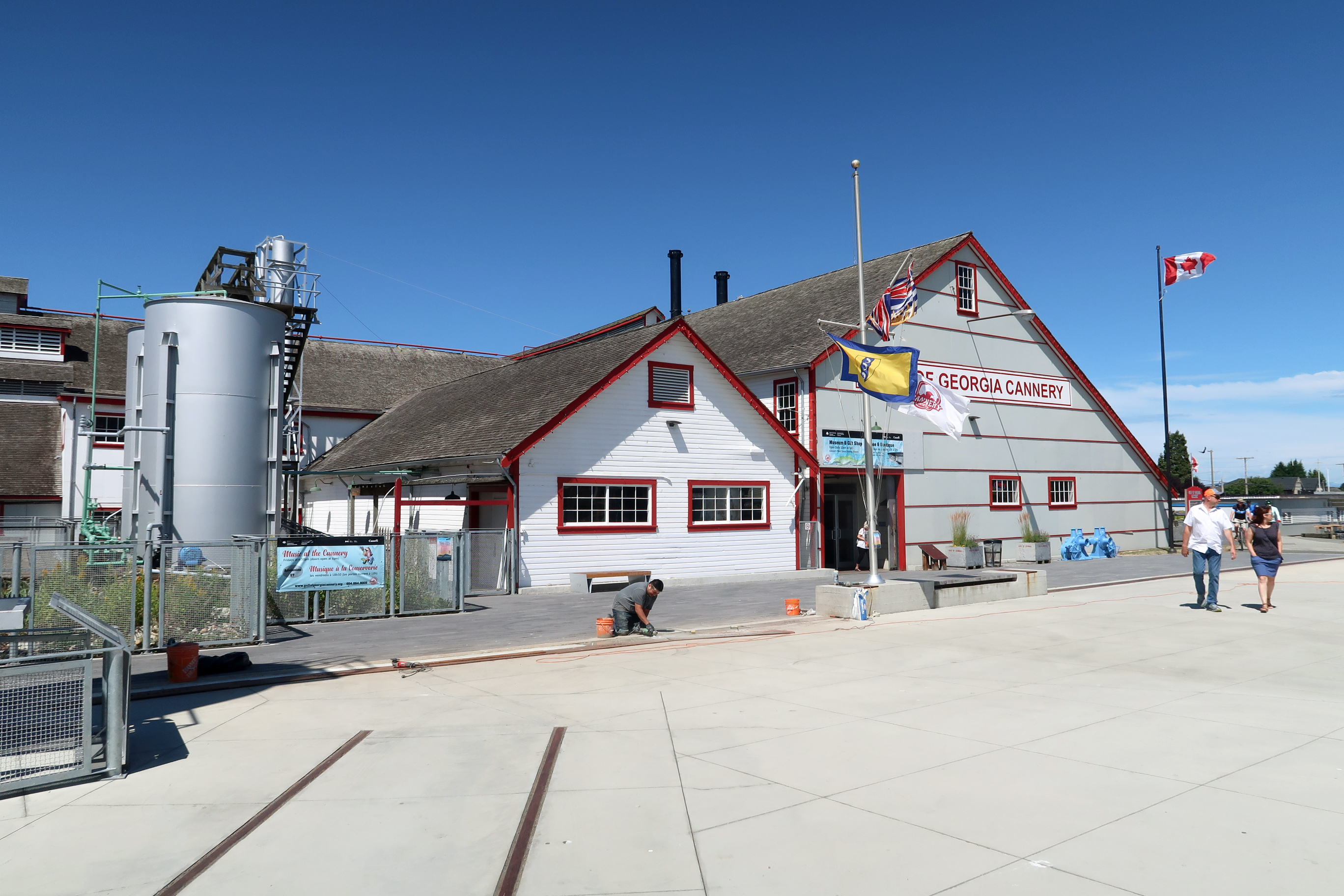
- Front Entrance of the Gulf of Georgia Cannery
- Interactive map of Gulf of Georgia Cannery National Historic Site
- 49.1248°N 123.1869°W
- Location: 12138 Fourth Ave, Richmond, British Columbia, Canada

History
- Founded: 1894
- Original use: Salmon cannery

Site notes
- Current use: Industrial heritage and maritime museum
- Owner: Parks Canada
- Management: Gulf of Georgia Cannery Society
- Website: Parks Canada

National Historic Site of Canada
- Designated: June 15, 1976
- DFRP Number: 56486 00

Gulf of Georgia Cannery National Historic Site
- Established: 1994
- Executive director: Elizabeth Batista
- Chairperson: Perry Mazzone
- Curator: Tatyana Beck
- Historian: Heidi Rampfl
- Public transit access: Steveston Exchange
- Website: gulfofgeorgiacannery.org

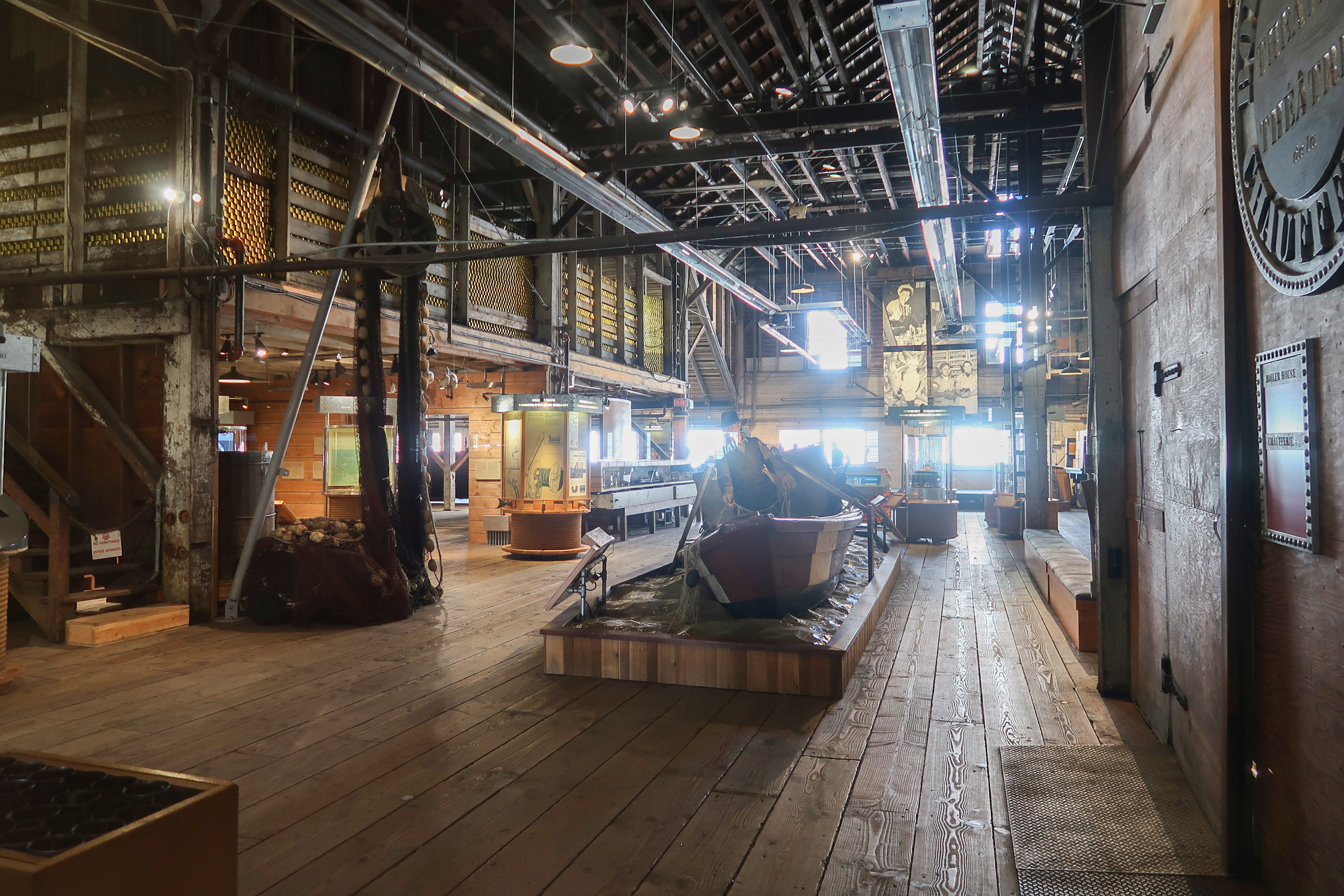
The Cannery's Museum Interior

The Gulf of Georgia Cannery is a National Historic Site of Canada located in Steveston village in Richmond, British Columbia.

Built in 1894, the cannery echoes the days when it was the leading producer of canned salmon in British Columbia. Today it is a museum with interactive exhibits, film, and tours that demonstrate the Cannery's important role in the history of Canada's West Coast fishing industry. The Gulf of Georgia Cannery Society, a non-profit community organization, operates the site on behalf of Parks Canada.

== History ==
=== Early years ===
The cannery opened in 1894, in the boomtown of Steveston on the lower Fraser River. It was the largest cannery in British Columbia until 1902. It was known as the "Monster Cannery" – packing more than 2.5 million cans of salmon in 1897. Each canning season attracted a workforce of hundreds of workers, usually of First Nations, Chinese, Japanese, and European descent. At the time, fish canning was one of British Columbia's largest employers, and produced one of its principal export commodities.

=== Advancing technology ===
Over the years, the hordes of people manually canning salmon gave way to rows of high-speed machinery. For the Gulf of Georgia Cannery, the price to pay for these advancements would be a diminished role in the canning of salmon, as the last can of sockeye rolled off the production line in 1930. Then, the British Columbia Fishing and Packing Company and Gosse Packing Company Limited merged, forming British Columbia Packers Limited, an amalgamation of the other canneries in the community.

=== World War 2 ===
The Gulf of Georgia Cannery remained quiet during the 1930s, but with the outbreak of the Second World War in Europe, the Cannery was revitalized by an onslaught of new capital and expansion in anticipation of a new enterprise, namely herring. New machinery and an army of workers produced case after case of canned herring in tomato sauce, the major source of protein for Allied soldiers and civilians struggling overseas during the war. Herring canning became an industry-wide endeavour and alongside it grew the business of herring reduction, that is, the transformation of herring into protein-rich oil and meal for animal feeding purposes.

=== Post war ===
The end of the war meant the end of a market and the end of herring canning in British Columbia. For the Gulf of Georgia Cannery, herring reduction would become the predominant activity by the late 1940s. The rise of this industry is reflected by the growth of the Cannery complex which saw three successive waves of expansion before the herring reduction industry was crippled by overfishing and government closure in the late 1960s. By the 1970s, a new market emerged in Japan for British Columbia herring roe and this ensured that the reduction operation at the Cannery would run once more. However, the new roe industry generated only a small amount of raw material for reduction, as catches formerly in the hundreds of thousands of tonnes were limited by regulation to the low tens of thousands.

=== Closure ===
By 1979, the cost of operating the Cannery's aging reduction equipment became too much and the reduction plant was closed. The buildings would serve as a net loft and storage for the Canadian Fishing Company's boat fleet and the era of transforming the Cannery into a museum would begin in earnest.

=== National Historic Site ===
During the 1970s and early 1980s the local community lobbied various levels of government to save the Cannery. In 1979 the Federal government purchased the property and in 1984 it was transferred to Parks Canada. The building was first open to the public in 1994 in celebration of the centennial of the building. The Gulf of Georgia Cannery Society, a local not-for-profit organization, was formed in 1986 to work together with Parks Canada to develop and operate the site. Today, the Cannery is one of the very few federally owned National Historic Sites operated by a third party.

== Chronology ==
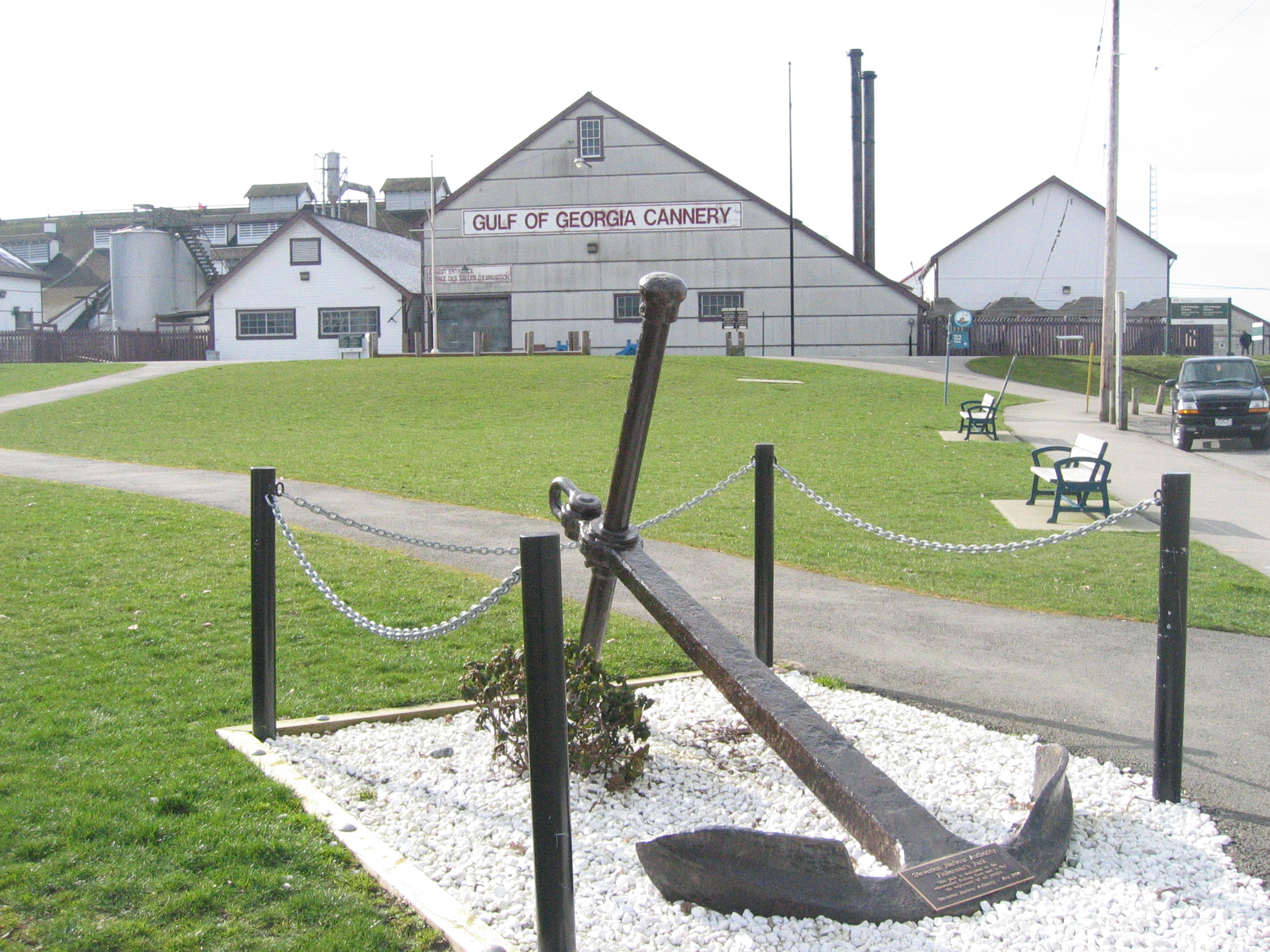
The Cannery, seen from the Fisherman's Park (2007)

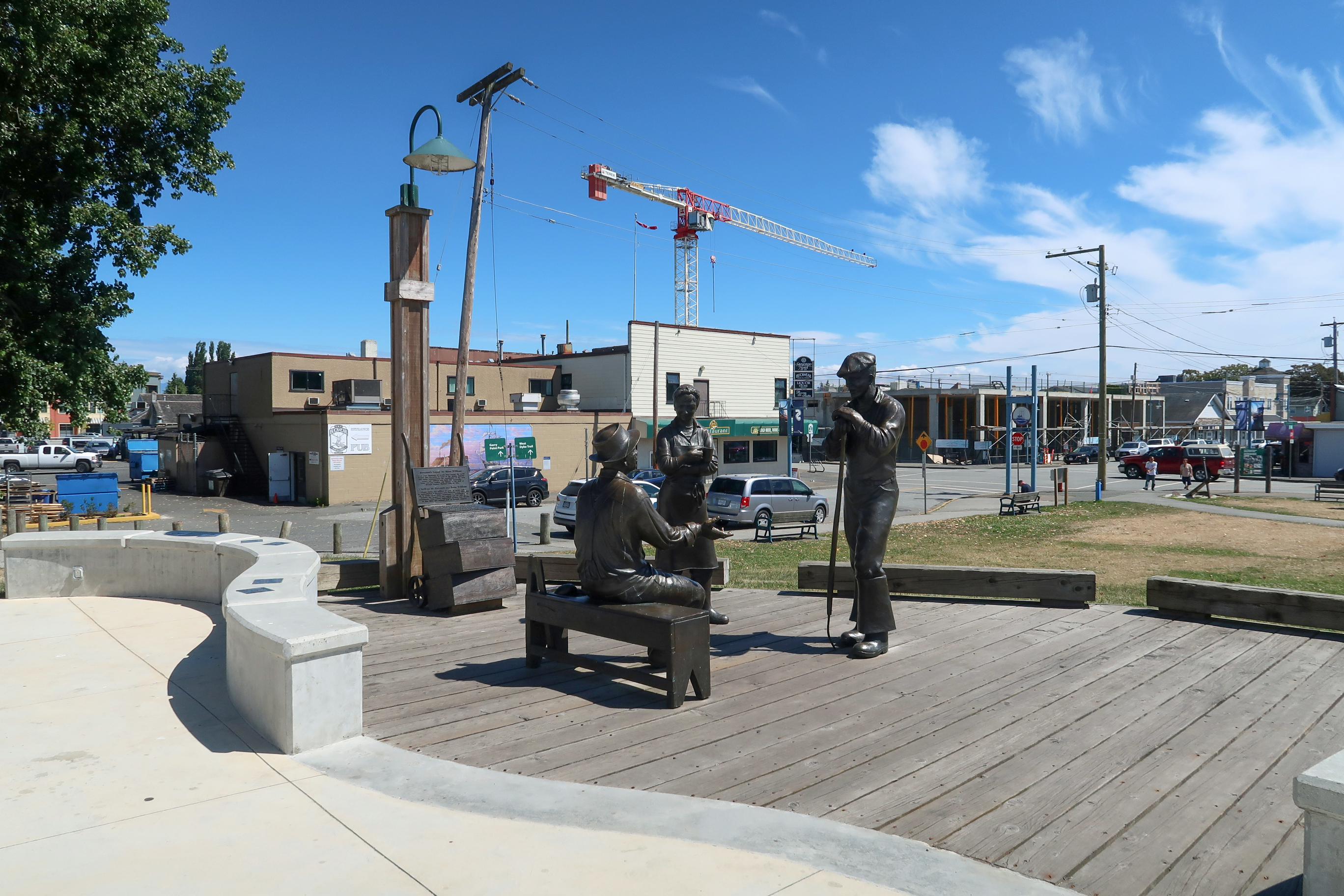
Fisherman's Park sculpture in 2018

1894 – Construction of the original L-shaped building; one manual canning line.

1897 – East Wing built to provide additional packing and seasonal living area. Two additional canning lines added.

1906 – Arrival of the mechanical butchering machine; West wing (butchering shed) converted to net loft/storage. East wing shortened by 50 feet (15 m) in 1906 due to new dyke and railway tracks along the waterfront.

1932 – Remains of the West wing demolished by a windstorm.

1940 – Roofline raised to accommodate additional boiler (boiler house).

1943 – Ice house built (in order to store fish for a longer amount of time).

1940–1948 – Various structural modifications and additions related to the herring reduction process: Vitamin oil shed and dryer shed.

1956 – East wing of original building raised to accommodate evaporator. Separator room constructed next to evaporator room.

1964 – Addition of grinding and bagging room off drying shed.

1979 – Gulf of Georgia reduction plant closed, building is used as a net loft.

1994 – Gulf of Georgia Cannery National Historic Site of Canada opens to the public.

== Tours ==
Tours of the facility are led by heritage interpreters, and a 25-minute film is offered upon request. Special programs are offered for school groups. The facility is wheelchair accessible, and programs are offered in English and French.
