= Tlʼetinqox-tʼin =

Tsilhqotʼin First Nation of British Columbia

The Tlʼetinqox-tʼin are a First Nations people in the Chilcotin District of the Canadian province of British Columbia. They are a subgroup of the Tsilhqotʼin people and reside near the community of Alexis Creek, an unincorporated settlement and Indian Reserve community on Highway 20 near Riske Creek.

Their band government is called the Tlʼetinqox-tʼin Government Office. The name of their main reserve, Anahim's Flat Indian Reserve No. 1, in the Chilcotin language is Tlʼetinqox, meaning "river flats", although it is commonly known as Anaham (which is used also for the whole Alexis Creek locality). Anaham should not be confused with Anahim Lake, which is a different community and has a different band government, the Ulkatcho First Nation, who are Dakelh (Carrier). The name of Anahim Lake in Tsilhqotʼin, however, is also Tlʼetinqox.
