= Anaham =

Anaham or Tletinqox is an unincorporated settlement and First Nations community of the Tsilhqot'in people, located near Alexis Creek in the Chilcotin District of the Central Interior of British Columbia, Canada and a 19th-century chief of the Tsilhqot'in people of British Columbia. In modern use it may refer to:

- Alexis Creek, British Columbia
- The main reserve of the Tl'etinqox-t'in Government Office (formerly the Anaham Reserve First Nations)
- Chief Anaham

== See also ==
- Anahim Lake, British Columbia
