= Tŝilhqotʼin National Government =

Tribal council in British Columbia, Canada

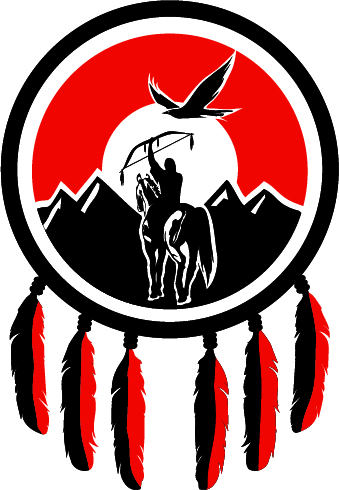
- Founded: 1989
- Type: First Nation Government / Tribal Council
- Location: Williams Lake, British Columbia
- Region served: Tsilhqotʼin
- Members: ʔEsdilagh; Tsi Del Del; Yunesitʼin; Tlʼetinqox; Xeni Gwetʼin; Tlʼesqox
- Website: Tŝilhqot’in National Government

The Tŝilhqotʼin National Government (TNG), is a First Nations tribal council representing the Tsilhqotʼin communities of Tl’etinqox, ʔEsdilagh, Yuneŝit’in, Tŝideldel, Tl’esqox and Xeni Gwet’in. Their office is located in Williams Lake, British Columbia, Canada. Tlʼesqox also belongs to the Carrier-Chilcotin Tribal Council, as does Ulkatcho - a community with both Dakelh (Carrier) & Tsilhqotʼin heritage. TNG was established in 1989.

== Departments ==
- Stewardship
- Employment
- Health
- Fisheries
- Language & Education
- Administration

== Member communities ==
The Tŝilhqot’in National Government represents six Tŝilhqot’in First Nations communities:

- ʔEsdilagh (Alexandria, BC)
- Tŝideldel (Redstone, BC – AKA Alexis Creek First Nation)
- Yunesitʼin (Stone – Hanceville, BC)
- Tl'etinqox (Anaham – Alexis Creek, BC)
- Xeni Gwetʼin (Nemiah Valley, BC)
- Tlʼesqox (Toosey – Riske Creek, BC)

== See also ==
- Tsilhqotʼin
- Tsilhqotʼin Nation v British Columbia
- Chilcotin language
- Chilcotin War
- Klattasine
- Carrier-Chilcotin Tribal Council
- List of tribal councils in British Columbia
