= Fred Quilt inquiry =

1971 investigation into the death of a First Nations elder in British Columbia, Canada

The Fred Quilt inquiries were two coroner's inquests into the November 1971 death of Fred Quilt, an elder of the Tsilhqot'in First Nation in the Chilcotin Country region of the west-central British Columbia Interior. Members of Quilt's family alleged that he died days after being beaten by Royal Canadian Mounted Police (RCMP) constables. The inquest juries found no wrongdoing on the part of the RCMP. A group of activists formed the Fred Quilt Committee, which raised money for Quilt's family, and later attempted to press criminal charges against the RCMP. The two constables were exonerated in 1977 by Quilt's widow's deathbed confession that she had caused Quilt's fatal injury and had orchestrated false testimony by herself and other witnesses.

== November 28, 1971 ==
=== Incident ===
On November 28, 1971, the RCMP received a call about a pickup truck blocking Highway 20 around Alexis Creek near Williams Lake. RCMP constables Daryl Bakewell and Peter Eakins responded and found Fred Quilt along with three other members of his family in the pickup. Fred Quilt, who was 55, was arrested on charges of drunk driving. The RCMP constables alleged that the four were "extremely intoxicated" and that Fred Quilt had to be pulled from the truck where he fell to the ground. The two officers also claimed that Fred Quilt fell again as he was being taken to the police truck in which the four were driven to the nearby Anaham Reserve.

=== Death ===
Quilt complained of stomach pain that night and the following day, but refused to ride in an ambulance to Williams Lake's Cariboo Memorial Hospital (because the ambulance carried the body of a dead child). He instead went to the Stone Reserve until the following day when he was taken to Cariboo Memorial Hospital where he would die on November 30, 1971. Before his death he told a nurse at the hospital that a RCMP officer jumped up and down on him a claim which was supported by Quilt's wife, Christine, and sister-in-law, Agnes. An autopsy performed by Dr. Han Choo Lee found that Quilt died from peritonitis due to "complete severance of the small bowel".

=== Inquests ===
First Inquest

A coroner's inquest, held in January 1972, took place in Williams Lake. The Fred Quilt committee was represented by Harry Rankin, a famous lawyer, activist and one-time Vancouver Alderman. Rankin would later be called before the BC Law Society for telling Native representatives that the police didn't mind beating up an Indian, but they "didn't like to get caught." He was originally threatened with disbarment, but all charges were later dropped. The inquest conclusion rejected claims of police brutality as the cause of death.

Second Inquest

A second coroner's inquest was ordered to be held in Kamloops after Attorney General Leslie Peterson learned that some of the first inquest's jury members (who were all white, despite 60% of the area's population being indigenous) had close ties to the Williams Lake RCMP unit. The jury for the second inquest was made up of four men and two women, including two First Nation members. On August 4, 1972, the jury returned with an open verdict, saying Quilt's "injury was caused by way of an unknown blunt force applied by an unknown object to his lower abdomen." The jury also ruled that the injury happened sometime between moving Quilt from the pickup into the police vehicle. The jury did not lay blame on anyone for Quilt's death.

Christine Quilt dying confession

On March 18, 1977, page 1, The Province newspaper reported that "Christine Quilt, widow of Chilcotin Indian Fred Quilt, confessed before her death that she backed their truck into him the night he was fatally injured in 1977, RCMP said Thursday." "The new information is that Quilt was urinating behind the truck when his wife backed up the truck and knocked him down. Then she put Fred back in the cab of the truck before the RCMP arrived." "RCMP Chief Supt. Gordon Dalton said Mrs. Quilt, who died of cancer last September, also confessed to the fatal shooting of Rose Setah on the Stone Lake Indian reserve near Williams Lake in 1968. The confessions could lead... to a pardon and possible compensation for Stephen Hink, who served a three-year prison term for manslaughter in the Setah case. [Dalton said,] 'Hink also had heard the rumours about Mrs. Quilt's confessions before police talked to him.'"

== Fred Quilt Committee ==
The Fred Quilt Committee was a group of activists fighting for Fred Quilt's case. They regarded Fred Quilt's death as the RCMP beating to death of a First Nation elder. After the Second Inquest they voiced their disappointment with the verdict and released a statement that they would proceed with an attempt to start criminal charges against one of the RCMP members who were present at Fred Quilt's alleged beating. They also supported Fred Quilt's family after his death and attempted to raise money to buy his widow's 20 head of cattle.

== Bibliography ==
Notes

References

- Clement, Dominique (2009). Canada's Rights Revolution: Social Movements and Social Change, 1937-82 (2009 ed.). UBC Press. ISBN 978-0-7748-1480-5. - Total pages: 296
- Dawson, Michael (1998). The mountie from dime novel to Disney (1998 ed.). Between The Lines. ISBN 1-896357-16-4. - Total pages: 214
- Moran, Bridget (1998). Judgement at Stoney Creek (1998 ed.). Arsenal pulp press. ISBN 1-55152-053-2. - Total pages: 201
- "Use Kid Gloves A-G tells Police". The Province. August 4, 1972. p. Cover.
- "Quilt 'confession' may reopen inquest, bring slaying pardon". The Province. March 18, 1977. p. Cover.
