= Esdilagh First Nation =

First Nation in North Cariboo region of British Columbia

ʔEsdilagh First Nation
- Band No. 709
- People: Tsilhqotʼin
- Headquarters: Quesnel
- Province: British Columbia

Population (2024)
- On reserve: 54
- On other land: 4
- Off reserve: 219
- Total population: 277

Government
- Council: Howard Johnny; Emery Paul

Tribal Council
- Tsilhqotʼin National Government

ʔEsdilagh First Nation (ES-dee-lah), formerly Alexandria First Nation, is a First Nation community in the North Cariboo region of British Columbia, Canada. It is the smallest of the six member communities that form the Tsilhqot'in National Government. Formerly, the people of this region were known as ʔElhdaqox-t'in, the people of the Sturgeon River (Where ʔElhdaqox refers to what is now called the Fraser River - ʔElhdachugh being sturgeon, and Yeqox being the river). Today, the community goes by the name ʔEsdilagh, which in Tŝilhqot'in language means peninsula.

== Chief and councillors (Dec 2024 election) ==
- Chief: Troy Baptiste
- Councillor: Howard Johnny (Term Ending August 2025)
- Councillor: William Baptiste (term ending December 2028)

== Treaty process ==
As a member of the Tŝilhqot'in National Government, ʔEsdilagh chose to opt-out of the British Columbia Treaty Process, instead fighting in the BC (and later Canada) Supreme Courts to prove unextinguished Aboriginal Title - see Tsilhqot'in Nation v British Columbia. After their win against the crown, the Tŝilhqot'in Nation has been undergoing negotiations with the Province of British Columbia under the "Nenqay Deni Accord" which will lead to the establishment of Category A "Title-like lands" and Category B "co-management" lands.

== History ==
The history of this region is best told by the oral traditions of the Tŝilhqot'in elders — whereby stories are told in the traditional language after the sun goes down.

Formerly, the people of this region were known as ʔElhdaqox-t'in, the people of the Sturgeon River (Where ʔElhdaqox refers to what is now called the Fraser River - ʔElhdachugh being sturgeon, and Yeqox being the river). Today, the community goes by the name ʔEsdilagh, which in Tŝilhqot'in language means peninsula.

During the time of the fur trade in British Columbia, many other First Nations settled in the region in order to trade with the nearby Hudson's Bay Company's Fort Alexandria. However, after two serious waves of Smallpox decimated Tŝilhqot'in populations in the late 1850s and early 1860s, the Tŝilhqot'in Nation decided it would be safest to extradite all non-Tŝilhqot'in peoples from their homeland. The threat of an intentional third wave of smallpox by one of Alfred Waddington's road crewmen in Bute Inlet was the trigger for the so-called Chilcotin War of 1864.

ʔEsdilagh was the birthplace of Chief Alexis who was himself ʔElhdaqox-t'in, and who the community of Alexis Creek, and the official name of the Chilcot'in Community of Tŝideldel (Alexis Creek Indian Band) is named.

== Programs and facilities ==
A new health centre was constructed in 2016, named after former ʔEsdilagh Chief Frank "Chendi" Joe. The community has been developing agriculturally as well - with a new community/market garden and a commercial sized root cellar.

== See also ==
- Tsilhqot'in
- Tsilhqotʼin language
- Chilcotin District
- Tsilhqot'in Tribal Council
- Carrier-Chilcotin Tribal Council
