= Fort Kluskus =

Defunct Hudson's bay trading post

- Location within British Columbia
- 53°05′00″N 124°30′00″W
- Type: Fur trade outpost
- Location: Kluskus Lakes, Chilcotin District, Central Interior of British Columbia, Canada

History
- Built: 1844
- Built for: Hudson's Bay Company
- Abandoned: unknown, but not long after built

Fort Kluskus was a Hudson's Bay Company fort and trading post located near the Kluskus Lakes on the northern perimeter of the Chilcotin District of the Central Interior of British Columbia, Canada.

Established in 1844, it was effectively a relocation of trading operations from Fort Chilcotin 110 kilometres (70 mi) to the south, which had failed due to disinterest and resistance by the Tsilhqot'in people.

The location at Kluskus Lake (or Lake Tluzcuz) was chosen to take advantage of the beaver trade from inland indigenous traveling to the Pacific coast. But Fort Kluskus did not succeed due to already-established strong trade relations between the local Dakelh people and coastal peoples. It is unknown when it closed.

== See also ==
- Kluskus First Nation
- List of Hudson's Bay Company trading posts
