= Tlʼesqox First Nation =

Tsilhqot'in community in Chilcotin, British Columbia, Canada

Tlʼesqox (or Toosey) Indian Band is a Tsilhqotʼin community located west of the Fraser Canyon in the Chilcotin region of the Canadian province of British Columbia. It is a member of the Carrier-Chilcotin Tribal Council, which includes both Tsilhqotʼin and Carrier (Dakelh) communities.

The Tlʼesqox Indian Band reserve community and offices are located at Riske Creek, which is on the Fraser River just southwest of the city of Williams Lake.

== Chief and Councillors ==
Chief Frances Laceese; Coun. Clayton Palmatier; Coun. Georgina Johnny; Counc. Violet Tipple

== Indian Reserves ==
Indian reserves under the administration of the Tlʼesqox First Nation are:

- Baptiste Meadow Indian Reserve No 2, on Riske Creek, 5 km northwest of the Riske Creek PO, 226.60 ha. 51°59′50″N 122°33′15″W
- Toosey Indian Reserve No. 1, on Riske Creek, 6.5 km west of its mouth on the Fraser River. 2339.10 ha. 51°55′10″N 122°29′00″W
- Toosey Indian Reserve No. 1A, west of and adjoining IR No. 1, 11.80 ha. 51°55′00″N 122°32′00″W
- Toosey Indian Reserve No. 3, 5 km east of the mouth of Riske Creek, 5.0 ha. 51°53′00″N 122°21′00″W

== See also ==
- Chilcotin language
- Tsilhqot'in Tribal Council
- 2016 Census, Toosey 1
- Regional Community Literacy Plan,2011-2012
