= Chilanko Forks =

- unincorporated community
- Location of Chilanko Forks in British Columbia
- Coordinates: 52°07′00″N 124°04′00″W
- Country: Canada
- Province: British Columbia
- Regional District: Cariboo
- Region: Chilcotin
- Elevation: 909 m (2,982 ft)
- Area codes: 250, 778

Chilanko Forks is an unincorporated settlement as well as a First Nations community of the Tsilhqot'in people, located on the north bank of the Chilanko River just northeast of Tatla Lake, and immediately south of Puntzi Lake, in the Chilcotin District of the Central Interior of British Columbia. Chilanko Forks is the location of the offices of the Alexis Creek First Nation.

== History ==
From its opening in 1907 until its closing in 1918, the post office at this location was spelled "Chilanco Forks", as was also the spelling on Joseph Trutch's 1871 map of British Columbia. The community was once also the off base living area for a US airbase (917th Aircraft Control and Warning Squadron - Pinetree Line 1952-1963) then, after the US withdrawal, an RCAF base (Squadron 55 - 1963-1966).

Sawmill workers (1963–1971) also lived there until mill operations ceased though steady changes in logging operations meant constantly fluctuating population numbers for Chilanko Forks, at least along the roads near to, or leading to, the airbase. Beginning in 1963 Pinnette and Therrien of Williams Lake began logging operations around nearby Puntzi Lake and a portable mill was used throughout the area. Eventually sited at the extreme eastern end of the lake, the operation ran until August 1964 when it relocated to a spot about fifty kilometers back north into the bush at Chezacut. Following a particularly severe winter, with temperatures as extreme as 70 degrees F below zero, Pinnette and Therrien transferred their operation back to Chilanko Forks. The mill was then situated at the junction of the old highway and the base access road near Skinner Bridge (a name which has since evolved into Skinny Bridge - even though the bridge itself no longer exists). Relocation was undertaken in March 1965. It was at this time that Pinnette and Therrien phased out its logging operation in the area in favour of contracting the work to Illnicki Logging of Williams Lake. In 1966 a planer mill was added to the operation. In 1971 operations ceased following a mill fire.

Each of the above changes/developments had significant effects on the size of the population of Chilanko Forks. The size of the aboriginal population was not impacted by these events. Currently the area nearest the airstrip is clustered along two main roads that lead off the highway, and other various loops and a branch road while one of the roads originally surveyed in 1963 has (East of Puntzi Airport Road) reverted to bush. Outlying ranches and the main Aboriginal settlement are important. There has been some expansion near Redstone Reserve and a satellite community has grown up just east of the main area (situated on what was once a gathering place and ball field).

Dial phone systems began operating in the community on July 27, 1988. The current Chilanko Forks 'centre' has been relocated (there is a cut off loop from the highway that passes the old location).

== Climate ==
Chilanko Forks has a subarctic climate in spite of its low latitude and position far to the west on the North American mainland.

The climate of Chilanko Forks, and indeed much of the Chilcotin experiences extremely cold temperatures from time to time. Although the average temperature during the winter would be considered mild on the Prairies, extreme cold snaps can drop the temperature down to values not typically found south of the Yukon. The weather station at the nearby Puntzi airbase recorded −52.8 °C (−63 °F) in December 1968. Even Yellowknife has never been this cold.

Due to the very dry air, clear skies, lack of wind, and geography, Chilanko Forks has one of the highest diurnal temperature variations in Canada, and the highest variation in British Columbia. The diurnal temperature variation in both February and May is the highest in Canada.

The all-time high temperature of 39.8 °C (104 °F) was set on June 29, 2021.

Climate data for Puntzi Mountain Airport
Month	Jan	Feb	Mar	Apr	May	Jun	Jul	Aug	Sep	Oct	Nov	Dec	Year
Record high humidex	7.7	10.6	18.9	23.5	28.9	40.3	36.0	35.4	30.2	25.0	15.6	7.7	40.3
Record high °C (°F)	10.0 (50.0)	12.8 (55.0)	22.2 (72.0)	27.0 (80.6)	34.7 (94.5)	39.8 (103.6)	35.6 (96.1)	38.0 (100.4)	32.3 (90.1)	27.0 (80.6)	18.0 (64.4)	13.9 (57.0)	39.8 (103.6)
Mean daily maximum °C (°F)	−5.2 (22.6)	1.0 (33.8)	5.8 (42.4)	11.2 (52.2)	16.8 (62.2)	20.0 (68.0)	23.7 (74.7)	23.3 (73.9)	18.3 (64.9)	10.9 (51.6)	1.0 (33.8)	−5.3 (22.5)	10.1 (50.2)
Daily mean °C (°F)	−12.3 (9.9)	−7.9 (17.8)	−2.2 (28.0)	3.2 (37.8)	8.2 (46.8)	11.8 (53.2)	14.7 (58.5)	14.1 (57.4)	9.5 (49.1)	3.4 (38.1)	−4.7 (23.5)	−11.8 (10.8)	2.2 (36.0)
Mean daily minimum °C (°F)	−19.3 (−2.7)	−16.7 (1.9)	−10.1 (13.8)	−4.7 (23.5)	−0.4 (31.3)	3.5 (38.3)	5.7 (42.3)	4.9 (40.8)	0.7 (33.3)	−4.1 (24.6)	−10.4 (13.3)	−18.3 (−0.9)	−5.8 (21.6)
Record low °C (°F)	−52.2 (−62.0)	−45.6 (−50.1)	−39.4 (−38.9)	−20.2 (−4.4)	−10.4 (13.3)	−6.1 (21.0)	−3.0 (26.6)	−4.4 (24.1)	−13.3 (8.1)	−34.7 (−30.5)	−47.9 (−54.2)	−52.8 (−63.0)	−52.8 (−63.0)
Record low wind chill	−51	−51	−37	−21	−13	−5	−4	−8	−14	−27	−43	−48	−51
Average precipitation mm (inches)	18.1 (0.71)	12.2 (0.48)	14.1 (0.56)	16.4 (0.65)	26.6 (1.05)	36.5 (1.44)	30.1 (1.19)	28.1 (1.11)	20.8 (0.82)	21.2 (0.83)	32.0 (1.26)	18.4 (0.72)	274.6 (10.81)
Average relative humidity (%)	74.3	53.5	51.6	36.9	41.5	41.1	27.2	29.9	31.3	40.0	63.8	77.4	47.4
Source: Environment Canada

== Name ==
"Chilanko" means "many beaver river" in the Chilcotin language.

== See also ==
- Alexis Creek, British Columbia
- Tatla Lake, British Columbia
- Redstone, British Columbia
