= Redstone, British Columbia =

Tŝideldel Tŝideldel (Chilcotin) Redstone
- Location of Redstone in British Columbia
- Coordinates: 52°08′00″N 123°42′00″W
- Country: Canada
- Province: British Columbia
- Area codes: 250, 778

Tŝideldel, also called Redstone, is an unincorporated settlement and First Nations community of the Tsilhqot'in people, located near Chilanko Forks in the Chilcotin District of the Central Interior of British Columbia, Canada. Located on the Chilanko River, it should not be confused with the locality also called Redstone, 16 km to the east, located at the confluence of the Chilanko and Chilcotin Rivers. It includes Redstone Flat Indian Reserve No. 1, Redstone Flat Indian Reserve No. 1A, and Redstone Cemetery Indian Reserve No. 1B, all under the administration of the Alexis Creek First Nation.
