= Tŝideldel First Nation =

Band government of the Tsi Del Del people

- Band No. 710
- People: Tsilhqotʼin
- Headquarters: Tsi Del Del
- Province: British Columbia

Land
- Land area: 43.6 km^{2} (16.8 sq mi)

Population (2024)
- On reserve: 297
- On other land: 25
- Off reserve: 373
- Total population: 695

Government
- Chief: Otis Guichon Sr.

Tribal Council
- Tsilhqotʼin National Government

Website
- www.tsideldel.org

Tŝideldel First Nation is the band government of the Tsi Del Del subgroup of the Tsilhqot'in people, located in the Chilcotin District in the western Central Interior region of the Canadian province of British Columbia. It is a member of the Tsilhqot'in National Government.

The Tŝideldel First Nation reserve community and offices are located on the main reserve, Redstone Reserve. (Redstone is a literal translation of the Tsilhqot'in Tsi Del Del) The nearest post office is Chilanko Forks. It also includes smaller reserves around Redbrush and Puntzi Lake.

== Chief and Councillors ==
As of 10 January 2018, Otis Guichon Sr. is the current chief.

== History ==
Local oral histories are confident that the Tŝideldel First Nation was originally given a reserve at the mouth of the Alexis Creek (i.e. somewhat to the west of the town of Alexis Creek); the band was later moved to a less advantageous position at the Redstone Reserve.

== Demographics ==
There are approximately 400 people living on-reserve, and probably as many living off-reserve.

== Indian Reserves ==
Indian reserves under the administration of the Tŝideldel First Nation are:

- Agats Meadow Indian Reserve No. 8, 6 miles NW of Puntzi Lake east of any adjoining Toby's Meadow IR No. 4, 113.30 ha. 52°17′00″N 124°09′40″W
- Alexis Creek Indian Reserve No. 12, on Puntzi Creek 9 miles NE of Puntzi Lake, 1.30 ha. 52°14′00″N 124°14′00″W
- Alexis Creek Indian Reserve No. 13, on a small unnamed lake 9 miles W of Puntzi Lake, 550.40ha. 52°13′00″N 124°17′00″W
- Alexis Creek Indian Reserve No. 14, at W end of small unnamed lake 10 miles W of Punt Lake, 157.0 ha. 52°12′00″N 124°18′00″W
- Alexis Creek Indian Reserve No. 15, 11 miles W of Puntzi Lake, 1 mile S of IR No. 14, 32.40 ha. 52°12′00″N 124°19′00″W
- Alexis Creek Indian Reserve No. 16, 11 miles W of Puntzi Lake, 1 mile S of IR No. 15, 32.40 ha. 52°11′00″N 124°19′00″W
- Alexis Creek Indian Reserve No. 17, 12 miles W of Puntzi Lake, 2 miles W of IR No. 14, 161.90 ha. 52°12′00″N 124°22′00″W
- Alexis Creek Indian Reserve No. 18, on Puntzi Creek, 12 miles W of Puntzi Lake, 64.80 ha. 52°13′00″N 124°22′00″W
- Alexis Creek Indian Reserve No. 20, between Palmer and Jorgensen Creeks, 7 miles W of Chilcotin Lake, 64.80 ha. 52°19′00″N 124°15′00″W
- Alexis Creek Indian Reserve No. 21, on Jorgensen Creek, 8 miles SW of Chilcotin Lake, 356.10 ha. 52°18′00″N 124°17′00″W
- Alexis Creek Indian Reserve No. 22, on Jorgensen Creek, 10 miles W of Chilcotin Lake, 97.10 ha. 52°19′00″N 124°19′00″W
- Alexis Creek Indian Reserve No. 23, on south branch of Jorgensen Creek, 12 miles SW of Chilcotin Lake, 32.40 ha. 52°18′00″N 124°20′00″W
- Alexis Creek Indian Reserve No. 24, on south branch of Jorgensen Creek, 13 miles SW of Chilcotin Lake, 64.80 ha. 52°18′00″N 124°21′00″W
- Alexis Creek Indian Reserve No. 25, on south branch of Jorgensen Creek, 14 miles SW of Chilcotin Lake, 32.40 ha. 52°18′00″N 124°23′00″W
- Alexis Creek Indian Reserve No. 26, at headwaters of Jorgensen Creek, 16 miles SW of Chilcotin Lake, 113.30 ha. 52°18′00″N 124°26′00″W
- Alexis Creek Indian Reserve No. 27, 14 miles W of Chilcotin Lake, 64.80 ha. 52°19′00″N 124°25′00″W
- Alexis Creek Indian Reserve No. 28, on a tributary of Palmer Creek, 12 miles W of Chilcotin Lake, 129.50 ha. 52°22′00″N 124°22′00″W
- Alexis Creek Indian Reserve No. 29, on a tributary of Palmer Creek, 14 miles W of Chilcotin Lake, 97.10 ha. 52°22′15″N 124°23′45″W
- Alexis Creek Indian Reserve No. 30, on tributaries of Palmer Creek, 15 miles W of Chilcotin Lake, 194.30 ha. 52°23′00″N 124°25′00″W
- Alexis Creek Indian Reserve No. 31, on part of Palmer Creek 15 miles NW of Chilcotin Lake, 64.80 ha. 52°25′00″N 124°24′00″W
- Alexis Creek Indian Reserve No. 32, on part of Palmer Creek, 17 miles NW of Chilcotin Lake, 242.80 ha. 52°27′00″N 124°26′00″W
- Alexis Creek Indian Reserve No. 33, at headwater tributary of Palmer Creek, 18 miles NW of Chilcotin Lake, 32.40 ha. 52°27′00″N 124°28′00″W
- Alexis Creek Indian Reserve No. 34, 1 mile N of the Chilcotin River, 14 miles NW of Chilcotin Lake, 129.50 ha. 52°29′00″N 124°17′00″W
- Alexis Creek Indian Reserve No. 35, on the Chilcotin River 9 miles due NW of Chilcotin Lake, 64.80 ha. 52°26′00″N 124°14′00″W
- Alexis Creek Indian Reserve No. 6, on Palmer Creek, near W end of Chilcotin Lake, 80.90 ha. 52°21′00″N 124°05′00″W
- Charley Boy's Meadow Indian Reserve No. 3, 7 miles SW of Chilcotin Lake, 420.90 ha. 52°18′00″N 124°13′00″W
- Chezacut Cemetery Indian Reserve No. 5, on bay on north shore of Chilcotin Lake, 0.10 ha. 52°21′00″N 124°03′00″W
- Freddie Charley Boy Indian Reserve No. 7, on Palmer Creek, 2 miles W of Chilcotin Lake, 4.0 ha. 52°21′00″N 124°07′00″W
- Michel Gardens Indian Reserve No. 36, 3.40 ha. 52°09′01″N 123°54′54″W
- Puntzi Lake Indian Reserve No. 2, on the north shore of Puntzi Lake, 15.70 ha. 52°13′00″N 124°04′00″W
- Redstone Cemetery Indian Reserve No. 1B, on the Chilanko River, 1/2 mile E of Redstone Flat IR No. 1, 0.10 ha. 52°08′41″N 123°55′42″W
- Redstone Flat Indian Reserve No. 1, 12 miles W of junction with the Chilcotin River, 4 miles S of Puntzi Lake, 315.70 ha. 52°08′15″N 123°57′28″W
- Redstone Flat Indian Reserve No. 1A, north of and adjoining Redstone Flat IR No. 1, 275.20 ha. 52°09′04″N 123°57′15″W
- Seymour Meadows Indian Reserve No. 19, on W end of a small lake at head of Puntzi Creek, 16 miles W of Puntzi Lake, 174.0 ha. 52°12′00″N 124°27′00″W
- Toby Helenes Meadow Indian Reserve No. 10, on Puntzi Creek, 2 miles W of Puntzi Lake, 32.40 ha. 52°13′00″N 124°07′00″W
- Toby Helenes Meadow Indian Reserve No. 11, on Puntzi Creek, 4 miles W of Puntzi Lake, 16.10 ha. 52°13′00″N 124°08′00″W
- Toby Helenes Meadow Indian Reserve No. 9, 6.5 miles NW of Puntzi Lake, east of Toby's Meadow IR No. 4 and Agats Meadow IR No. 8, 64.80 ha. 52°16′00″N 124°10′00″W
- Toby's Meadow Indian Reserve No. 4, 5 miles SW of Chilcotin Lake, 64.80 ha. 52°18′00″N 124°11′00″W

== Economic Development ==
The band owns Tsi Del Del Development Corporation, which owns and operates several businesses. TDD Dev Corp. owns the Redstone gas bar on the highway, which is the only place to get gas between the Anaham gasbar and Tatla Lake. Many members still engage in ranching and hunter-guiding and entrepreneurship, as well as traditional hunting and fishing.

== Social, Educational and Cultural Programs and Facilities ==
There is a Tsi Del Del school, a federal health clinic, and an elders' centre.

== See also ==
- Tsilhqot'in
- Chilcotin language
- Chilcotin (region)
- Tsilhqot'in Tribal Council
- Carrier-Chilcotin Tribal Council
