= Xeni Gwetʼin First Nation =

First Nations government in British Columbia

Xeni Gwetʼin First Nations Government
- Band No. 714
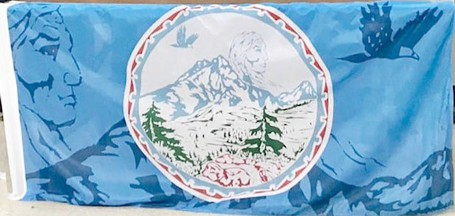
- Flag
- People: Tsilhqotʼin
- Headquarters: Nemaia Valley
- Province: British Columbia

Land
- Main reserve: Chilco Lake 1A
- Reserves: Chilco Lake 1; Garden 2, 2A; Lohbiee 3; Tanakut 4; Tsuunia Lake 5; Lezbye 6
- Land area: 12.605 km^{2} (4.867 sq mi)

Population (2025)
- On reserve: 194
- On other land: 53
- Off reserve: 234
- Total population: 484

Government
- Chief: Roger William
- Council: James Lulua Jr.; Stephanie Quilt

Tribal Council
- Tsilhqotʼin National Government

Website
- www.xeni-gwetin.ca

Xeni Gwetʼin First Nation is a First Nations government located in the southwestern Chilcotin District in the western Central Interior region of the Canadian province of British Columbia. It is a member of the Tsilhqotʼin National Government.

The Xeni Gwetʼin First Nation reserve community and offices are located at the wilderness community of Nemaia Valley, which lies between Chilko Lake and the Taseko Lakes. The First Nation was formerly called Nemaiah Valley First Nation.

They speak the Tsilhqot'in language.

== Chief and councillors ==
Roger William (chief, 1991-2008) was once again elected Chief on February 27, 2013 replacing Marilyn Baptiste, who served since 2010. William most recently served as Councillor with Xeni Gwetʼin. The vote was tallied at 133 to 94 William over Baptiste. Most observers regard this community as one of the best-managed in the area.

Councillors include James Lulua Jr. and Stephanie Quilt. They are governed through a custom electoral system.

== Treaty process ==
Xeni Gwetʼin First Nation Government chose not to take part in the British Columbia Treaty Process claiming it out-dated and ineffective, and instead fought for Aboriginal Rights and Title through the Canadian judicial system. On June 26, 2014, in Tsilhqotʼin Nation v British Columbia, The Supreme Court of Canada acknowledged Aboriginal Title to approximately 1,800 square kilometres of the nation's traditional territory - a first for any Indigenous group in Canada.

They are in the Cariboo region and served by the Cariboo (Williams Lake) BC regional office.

== Demographics ==
As of 2025, the band has 484 registered members. Of these, 194 of whom live on reserve.

== Economic development ==
The band has an active business management program, which runs the local roads yard as well as a gas-bar. Many new houses have been built in the subdivision area near the band office, with an electrical grid.

The area is not served by the main BC Hydro grid, and so (except for the subdivision) all houses are run on generators and solar power. They had their first telephones installed in 2009.

== Social, educational and cultural programs and facilities ==
The band has taken over the management of its health program, the only one of the Chilcotin communities to do so.

The local school runs from kindergarten to grade 8 in three classrooms; it is unusual for the area in having mostly long-term residents as teachers.

== See also ==
- Carrier-Chilcotin Tribal Council
- Chilko Lake
- Chilcotin language
- Chilcotin District
- Chilcotin War
- Klattasine
- Tsilhqotʼin
- Tsilhqotʼin National Government
- Tsʼylos Provincial Park
