= Marilyn Baptiste =

First Nations activist and politician from British Columbia

- Citizenship: Xeni Gwet'in First Nation and Canada
- Occupations: Chief of the Xeni Gwet'in First Nation; Consultant
- Awards: Eugene Rogers Award; Goldman Environmental Prize

Marilyn Baptiste is a former chief of the Xeni Gwet'in First Nation in British Columbia, Canada.

She was awarded the Eugene Rogers Award in 2011 for her role in the campaign to save Teztan Biny. She also received the Goldman Environmental Prize in 2015.

== See also ==
- (RAVEN) Respecting Aboriginal Values and Environmental Needs
