= Carrier-Chilcotin Tribal Council =

First Nations band in British Columbia

The Carrier-Chilcotin Tribal Council is a First Nations tribal council located in the Chilcotin District of the Central Interior of the Canadian province of British Columbia, and also on the Fraser River near the city of Quesnel. It consists of three Carrier bands and one Tsilhqot'in band. The other Tsilhqot'in bands belong to the Tsilhqot'in National Government. Most other Carrier bands are either unaffiliated or belong to the Carrier-Sekani Tribal Council. The Tribal Council's offices are in Williams Lake.

== Member governments ==
- Lhoosk'uz First Nation (at the Kluskus Lakes, west of Quesnel) - Lhoosk'uz people
- Lhtako Dene First Nation (Quesnel) - Lhtako people
- Ulkatcho First Nation (Anahim Lake) - Ulkatchot'en people

== History ==
The council began in the early 1980s as the Chilcotin Protocol Office before changing its name to the Chilcotin Ulkatcho Kluskus Tribal Council. In 1991, it was again renamed the Carrier Chilcotin Tribal Council.

== See also ==
- Tsilhqot'in
- Tsilhqotʼin language
- Chilcotin War
- Klattasine
- Anahim
- Alexis (chief)
- Dakelh
- Carrier language
- Tsilhqot'in Tribal Council
- List of tribal councils in British Columbia
