= Alexis Creek =

Creek in Canada

Location
- Country: Canada
- Province: British Columbia
- District: Cariboo Land District

Physical characteristics
- Source: Alexis Lake
  - location: Northwest of Alexis Creek
  - coordinates: 52°15′21″N 123°31′25″W
  - elevation: 3,412 ft (1,040 m)
- Mouth: Chilcotin River
  - location: Upstream from Alexis Creek
  - coordinates: 52°04′49″N 123°18′19″W
  - elevation: 2,283 ft (696 m)

Alexis Creek is a creek in the Chilcotin District of British Columbia, Canada, flowing southeast from its source in Alexis Lake into the Chilcotin River a short distance upstream from the town of Alexis Creek.

== Name origin ==
The name was conferred by the Geographic Boards Name of Canada in 1911. It was named either for Alexis Belanger, a Hudson's Bay Company interpreter, or for Chief Alexis, a leader of the Tsilhqot'in in the mid-19th Century. Alexis remained neutral in the Chilcotin War of 1864 and met with Governor Seymour during the latter's expedition to the vicinity during that affair. Seymour describes him in his journal:

....Chief Alexis and his men came on at the best pace of their horses, holding their muskets over their heads to show they came in peace. Having ascertained which was the Governor, he threw himself from his horse and at once approached me. He was dressed in a French uniform, such as one sees in pictures of Montcalm

== See also ==
- Alexis Creek First Nation, the band government of the Tsi Del Del or Redstone group of the Tsilhqot'in people
- Alexis Creek Indian Reserves Nos. 6, 8 through 18, and 20 through 35, which are under the administration of the Alexis Creek First Nation
