= Tlʼetinqox-tʼin Government Office =

First Nations organization

Tl'etinqox Government
- Band No. 712
- People: Tsilhqotʼin
- Headquarters: Alexis Creek
- Province: British Columbia

Land
- Main reserve: Anahim's Flat No. 1
- Land area: 56.56 km^{2} (21.84 sq mi)

Population (2024)
- On reserve: 510
- On other land: 44
- Off reserve: 1194
- Total population: 1748

Government
- Chief: Joe Alphonse

Tribal Council
- Tsilhqotʼin Tribal Council

Website
- www.tletinqox.ca

Tlʼetinqox-tʼin Government Office is a First Nations government located in the Chilcotin District in the western Central Interior region of the Canadian province of British Columbia. Governing a reserve communities near Alexis Creek known as Anaham Reserve First Nations or Anaham, it is a member of the Tsilhqotʼin Tribal Council aka known as the Tsilhqotʼin National Government. The main reserve is officially known as Anahim's Flat No. 1, and is more commonly as Anaham. Other reserves are Anahim's Meadow No. 2 and 2A, and Anahim Indian Reserves Nos. 3 through 18. Anaham, or Anahim and Alexis were chiefs of the Tsilhqotʼin during the Chilcotin War of 1864, although they and their people did not take part in the hostilities.

The Tlʼetinqox-tʼin Government reserve community and offices are located east of the town of Alexis Creek. The main reserve is known as Tlʼetinqox ("the river flats") in the Chilcotin language. "Tlʼetinqox-tʼin" means "people of Tlʼetinqox". Most of the band's reserves are 10–20 miles to the north.

== History ==
Popular history is that the residents followed Chief Anahim east from Anahim.

== Demographics ==
It is by far the largest community in the Chilcotin, with a population of approximately 700.

== Indian Reserves ==
Indian Reserves under the administration of the Tlʼetinqox-tʼin Government are:

- Anahim Indian Reserve No. 10, a W end of unnamed lake, 4 miles SE of Stum Lake, 144.50 ha. 52°15′00″N 122°56′00″W
- Anahim Indian Reserve No. 11, on shore of lake 3 miles E of Stum Lake, 123.30 ha. 52°17′00″N 122°57′00″W
- Anahim Indian Reserve No. 12, 2 miles E of the north end of Stum Lake, 56.70 ha. 52°18′00″N 122°58′00″W
- Anahim Indian Reserve No. 13, a SE end of Stum Lake, 63.90 ha. 52°16′00″N 123°00′00″W
- Anahim Indian Reserve No. 14, on east shore of Stum Lake, 17 miles NE of Alexis Creek PO, 62.70 ha. 52°17′00″N 123°00′00″W
- Anahim Indian Reserve No. 15, on east shore of Stum Lake, 57.50 ha. 52°17′00″N 123°02′00″W
- Anahim Indian Reserve No. 16, 4 miles NW of Stum Lake, 242.80 ha. 52°20′00″N 123°05′00″W
- Anahim Indian Reserve No. 17, on west shore of small lake 4 miles N of Stum Lake, 139.60 ha. 52°22′00″N 123°04′00″W
- Anahim Indian Reserve No. 18, on Rosita Lake 24 miles N of Alexis Creek PO, 145.70 ha. 52°26′00″N 123°12′00″W
- Anahim Indian Reserve No. 3, 1 mile south of Alex Graham Lake, 11 miles NE of Alexis Creek PO, 64.80 ha. 52°12′00″N 123°04′00″W
- Anahim Indian Reserve No. 4, at east end of Alex Graham Lake, 12 miles NE of Alexis Creek PO, 12.50 ha. 52°13′00″N 123°04′00″W
- Anahim Indian Reserve No. 5, on small unnamed lake one mile S of Beaver Lake, 61.90 ha. 52°13′00″N 123°01′00″W
- Anahim Indian Reserve No. 6, on Beaver Lake, 139.60 ha. 52°13′00″N 123°00′00″W
- Anahim Indian Reserve No. 7, 14 miles NE of Alexis Creek PO, 46.50 ha. 52°12′00″N 122°58′00″W
- Anahim Indian Reserve No. 8, on north shore of lake south of Beaver Lake, 59.0 ha. 52°13′00″N 122°57′00″W
- Anahim Indian Reserve No. 9, 3 miles SE of Beaver Lake, 48.60 ha. 52°13′00″N 122°57′00″W
- Anahim's Flat Indian Reserve No. 1, left bank of the Chilcotin River, 3757.60 ha. 52°02′00″N 123°10′00″W
- Anahim's Meadow Indian Reserve No. 2, on Anahim Creek 2 miles NE of Alexis Creek PO, 257.80 ha. 52°07′00″N 123°14′00″W
- Anahim's Meadow Indian Reserve No. 2A, adjacent to Anahim's Meadow IR No. 2, 161.90 ha. 52°06′00″N 123°13′00″W

== Economic Development ==
The band operates a lumber business and a gas-bar.

== Social, Educational and Cultural Programs and Facilities ==
There is an elementary school on the reserve, but about half of the students go to the public school in nearby Alexis Creek.

The community's church burnt down in early 2007; there are several nuns living in a convent by the school.

== See also ==
- Tsilhqotʼin
- Tsilhqotʼin language
- Chilcotin District
- Tsilhqotʼin National Government
- Carrier-Chilcotin Tribal Council
