= Chilanko River =

- Mouth of Chilanko River
- Native name: Tsalhanqox (Chilcotin)

Location
- Country: Canada
- Province: British Columbia
- District: Cariboo Land District

Physical characteristics
- Mouth: Chilcotin River
  - location: Southeast of Puntzi Lake
  - coordinates: 52°06′54″N 123°41′04″W
  - elevation: 2,701 ft (823 m)

The Chilanko River is a river in the Chilcotin region of the Central Interior region of the Canadian province of British Columbia.

The name of the river derives from a Chilcotin word meaning "many beaver river".

== Course ==
The Chilanko River flows generally east, roughly parallel to the Chilcotin River, turning south to join the Chilcotin near the community of Alexis Creek, just above the confluence of the Chilko River. The settlement of Chilanko Forks is located farther up the river, just northeast of Tatla Lake and immediately south of Puntzi Lake.

== See also ==
- List of tributaries of the Fraser River
- List of rivers of British Columbia
