= Towdystan =

- Location of Towdystan in British Columbia
- Coordinates: 52°16′00″N 125°05′00″W
- Country: Canada
- Province: British Columbia
- Area codes: 250, 778

Towdystan is an unincorporated settlement and First Nations community of the Dakelh people located northwest of Charlotte Lake in the western Chilcotin District of the Central Interior of British Columbia, Canada. Located southeast of Anahim Lake, the headquarters of the Ulkatcho First Nation government, it includes Towdystan Lake Indian Reserve No. 3, which is one of the Indian Reserves of the Ulkatcho Nation and is located at 52°17′00″N 125°07′00″W. The reserve had a population of 10, down 50% from a 2001 figure of 20.
