= Heckman Pass =

Mountain pass in British Columbia, Canada

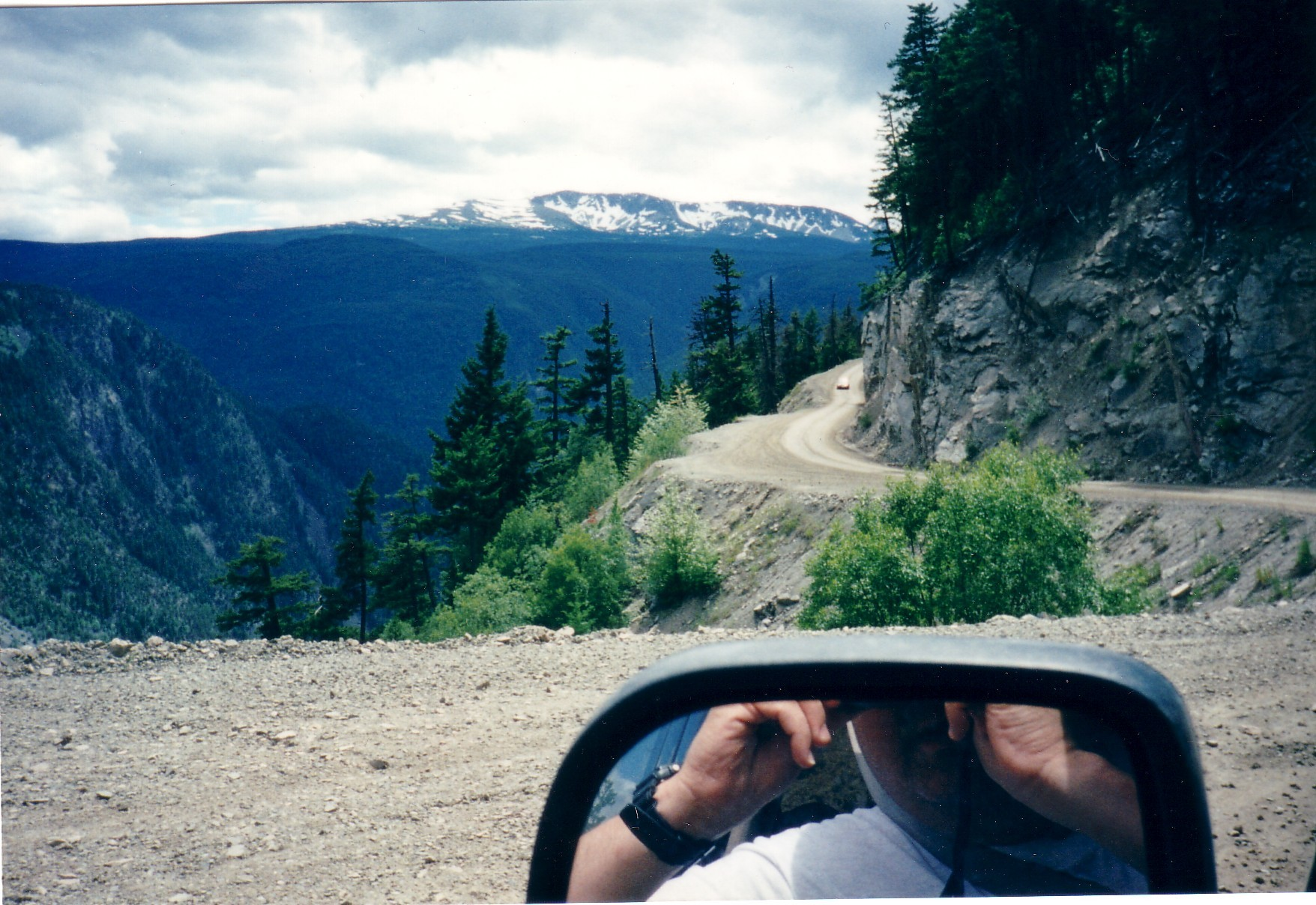
- The Hill

- Location within British Columbia
- Elevation: 1,524 m (5,000 ft)

Location
- Location: British Columbia, Canada
- Range: Rainbow Range
- Coordinates: 52°32′00″N 125°46′00″W
- Topo map: NTS 93C12 Tusulko River

Heckman Pass (el. 1,524 m or 5,000 ft) is a mountain pass in the Rainbow Range of west-central British Columbia, Canada, located west of Anahim Lake on the divide between the Chilcotin Plateau and the Bella Coola Valley. It is used by British Columbia Highway 20 and was the route used by Alexander Mackenzie on his journey to the Pacific Coast at Bella Coola via the grease trail along the West Road River from the Fraser.

== See also ==
- List of mountain passes
