= Xeni Gwet'in =

Tsilhqot'in First Nation of British Columbia

The Xeni Gwet'in, also known as the Stone Chilcotin, are a First Nations people whose traditional territory is located in the southern Chilcotin District of the Canadian province of British Columbia, on the inland flank of the Coast Mountains west of the Fraser River. They are a subgroup of the Tshilhqot'in people and are also known as the Stoney Chilcotin, and reside in the area of Nemaia Valley, an unincorporated settlement and Indian Reserve community far off Highway 20 between Chilko and Taseko Lakes.

The real name of the most famous member of the Xeni Gwet'in is not known - Klatassine or Klatsassan, the name for the leader of the Chilcotin War of 1864, means "we don't know who he was".

Their band government is called the Xeni Gwet'in First Nation.
