= Lhtako =

Tribe in British Columbia, Canada

Lhtako is the name of the tribe of Dakelh (Carrier) people who are today headquartered at Quesnel, British Columbia and incorporated under the Indian Act as the Red Bluff First Nation. Their southern neighbours are the T'exelc (Williams Lake) group of the Northern Secwepemc to the south, the Nazko people and Lhook'uz people to the west, the Tsilhqot'in peoples to the southwest, and the Lheidli Tenneh people to the north. Their territory borders with that of the Sekani on the northwest side of the Cariboo Mountains also. They are the southeasternmost of British Columbia's Athapaskan-speaking tribes.

The band takes its name from Lhtakoh, the name in the Carrier language for the Fraser River, in British Columbia, Canada.

The Lhtako Nation speaks the language of Dakelh and resides in the region of Cariboo under Chief Clifford Lebrun. The community is governed by the Indian Act. their community tribal association is under the carrier Chilcotin Tribal Council. Their community economy is built from gold found in their reserves.

== Area ==
Their reserve land consists of six hundred and eighty two hectares.

=== Population ===
The Lhtako Dene Nation population consists of one hundred and ninety one members.

== History ==
The community was previously known as Quesnel (Pre-1988) and as Red Bluff (1988-2010). The government presented Canada's First Nation with the "white paper" parliament with the intention to annul the Northern Development and Department of Indian Affairs. in 1969. In that same year in October, sixteen chiefs joined to create the Indian Brotherhood of the Northwest territories with the initiative to protect the rights of the Dene. The first issues they encountered was the building of a pipeline through the Mackenzie Valley to carry natural gas to Southern Canada and United States markets. In July 1976, the Dene published a Manifesto and the Dene Declaration. It demanded to be recognized as a separate nation in the Mackenzie Valley with its own government free from federal interference.

== Culture ==
The Lhtako Dene Nation is part of the Dakehl (or Southern Carrier) Nation in the Athabaskan language group.

== Agreements ==
Lhtako Dene has developed an agreement which is currently in place with Bakerville Gold Mine. Through an agreement with the Provincial Government, Lhtako Dene also began construction of a Biomass Energy Pellet plant. It also has a Clean Energy Business Fund Revenue Sharing Agreement with the province regarding the Castle Mountain Hydro Project. The community's government representatives (Chief Clifford Lebrun and councillors) are currently working on building relationship with Carrier Chilcotin Tribal Council member First Nations outside of the British Columbia treaty process. Lhtako is part of the First Nations Clean Energy Business Fund revenue Sharing Agreements. The Lhtako Agreement is known as the Castle Mountain Hydro Project and was contrived in 2016. The nation also is part of a few forestry agreements including: Lhtako FCRSA Amendment Agreement #1 in 2019, Lhtako Dene Forest Consultation and Revenue Sharing Agreement in 2018, and Lhtako Dene Nation Interim Measures Agreement in 2016. The purpose of the Lhtako Dene Nation Interim Measures Agreement was to guarantee that the Red Bluff Indian Band were economically accommodated in terms of the government's intervention and alteration of the environment, specifically forest resource development and forest management to ensure that the Lhtako Dene received profit form the government's extraction of the resources from their land. It encouraged the Red Bluff Indian Band's presence in concerns pertaining to the forest sector. The participation grants the Red Bluff Band with economic stability and source of income which stabilizes their community and improves its quality of life. The Lhtako Dene Forest Consultation and Revenue Sharing Agreements purpose and objective was to establish a consultation process in which each participating party would meet their obligations relating to the impacts of proposed forest and range resource development activities and to provide a Revenue Sharing Contribution to support the capacity of the First Nation ensuring that Lhtako may improve the social, economic, and cultural aspects of their community. The third article guarantees British Columbia's calculation and timing of payments to Lhtako Dene First Nation. The Lhtako Dene FCRSA Amendment Agreement (2019) is a reproduction of the previous agreement with slight amendments and additions. Te lhtako Dene First Nation's other agreements include: the southern Dakehl Funding Agreements (2021), Lhtako Dene nation Economic & Community Development Agreement (2020), and Southern Dakehl Nation Alliance Hubulhsooninats'Uhoot'alh Foundation Framework Agreement (2018).

== Events ==
The First Nation Health Authority is an organization that inspires health through wellness. The association organizes programs and events to educate and promote health to the First Nation communities in order to improve their lifestyles and overall well being, so their group could thrive and develop. The Lhtako Dene community hosted an event in their community hall as part of their Winter Wellness Grants in Quesnel. The event was organized in order to instill and ensure that health and wellness were prioritized in the community member's lives. The Lktako Nation attempted to achieve this by combining educational wellness activities with access to health checkups and screening services. The event included various events such as Hoop dancing Performers, medicine bag making, Elder storytelling, and a community feast in order to ensure that the activities would please and cater members of all members of the community from the youth to the elders. There were health screening tests such as blood pressure testing, glucose testing, and diabetes information from a professional nutritionist alongside their nation's traditional cultural practices. The event combined traditional cultural practices with modern wellness rituals. It allowed the youth and Elders to work together, educating one another, and as a result progressing their community. The organizers' challenge was attempting to conduct the event in such a small town hall and fit all the activities and community members. The Lhtako Dene Nation demonstrated that wellness is a community event to be embraced and can be fun when they all work together.
