= Kluskus Lakes =

Group of lakes in British Columbia, Canada

Coordinates: 53°05′00″N 124°30′00″W

The Kluskus Lakes /ˈklʌskəs/ are a group of lakes on the northern perimeter of the Chilcotin District of the Central Interior of British Columbia, Canada. They are located east of Tsacha Lake and south of the Euchiniko Lakes and are part of the drainage of the West Road River (aka Blackwater River). Fort Kluskus was located in the vicinity, which today includes numerous Indian Reserves of the eponymous Kluskus First Nation. The Kluskus Hills are also located between the Kluskus Lakes and the Euchiniko Lakes. "Kluskus" is the English rendering of the Carrier language word lhoosk'uz, meaning "the side of the fish is white".

== See also ==
- List of lakes in British Columbia
