= Kluskus First Nation =

Band government of the Lhooskʼuz

Lhooskʼuz Dene Nation
- Band No. 721
- People: Dakelh
- Headquarters: Quesnel
- Province: British Columbia

Land
- Main reserve: Kluskus 1
- Reserves: List: Bishop Bluffs 10; Bishop Bluffs 5; Bishop Bluffs 6; Chief Morris 13; Cluchuta Lake 10A; Cluchuta Lake 10B; Kloyadingli 2; Kluskus 14; Kushya Creek 12; Kushya Creek 7; Sundayman's Meadow 3; Tatelkus Lake 28; Tsachla Lake 8; Tzetzi Lake 11; Upper Kluskus Lake 9; Yaladelassla 4
- Land area: 16.5 km^{2} (6.4 sq mi)

Population (2024)
- On reserve: 26
- On other land: 20
- Off reserve: 185
- Total population: 231

Government
- Chief: June Baptiste
- Council: Craig Stillas; June Baptiste; Raven Chantyman

Tribal Council
- Carrier-Chilcotin Tribal Council

Website
- lhooskuz.com

Lhooskʼuz Dene Nation, formerly called Kluskus First Nation (/ˈklʌskəs/ KLUS-kəs), is the band government of the Lhooskʼuz (from Lhooz 'white fish' and kʼuz 'half/side of'), a Dakelh people whose main reserve is located near the Kluskus Lakes on the Chilcotin Plateau, 130 kilometres (81 mi) west of the city of Quesnel, British Columbia, Canada. The First Nation is a member of the Carrier-Chilcotin Tribal Council, which includes both Tsilhqot'in and Carrier (Dakelh) communities (the Kluskus First Nation is Carrier).

The Kluskus First Nation's offices are located in Quesnel.

== Indian Reserves ==
There are several Indian Reserves under the administration of the Kluskus First Nation:

- Bishop Bluffs Indian Reserve No. 10, 6 mi. E of Kluskus Lakes, 48.60 ha. 53°06′00″N 124°20′00″W
- Bishop Bluffs Indian Reserve No. 5, 7 mi. SE of Kluskus Lake, 64.80 ha. 53°04′00″N 124°19′00″W
- Bishop Bluffs Indian Reserve No. 6, 7 miles E of Kluskus Lake, 194.20 ha. 53°05′00″N 124°19′00″W
- Chief Morris Indian Reserve No. 13, 5 miles E of Kluskus Lake, 129.50 ha. 53°04′00″N 124°21′00″W
- Cluchuta Lake Indian Reserve No. 10A, on right (S) bank of the West Road River, 3 miles N of Cluchuta Lake, 64.80 ha. 52°58′00″N 125°04′00″W
- Cluchuta Lake Indian Reserve No. 10B, on right (S) bank of the West Road River, west end of and adjoining IR. No. 10A, 4.5 ha. 52°58′00″N 125°05′00″W
- Kloyadingli Indian Reserve No. 2, E end of the eastern Kluskus Lake, 221.70 ha. 53°07′00″N 124°23′00″W
- Kluskus Indian Reserve No. 1, W end of the N shore of the middle Kluskus Lake, 425.30 ha. 53°06′00″N 124°29′00″W
- Kluskus Indian Reserve No. 14, 5 Mi. E of the easterly Kluskus Lake, 48.60 ha. 53°07′00″N 124°18′00″W
- Kushya Creek Indian Reserve No. 12, 3 mi. W of Kluskus Lake, 16.20 ha. 53°05′00″N 124°39′00″W
- Kushya Creek Indian Reserve No. 7, 3 mi. W of West Kluskus Lake, 64.70 ha. 53°05′00″N 124°40′00″W
- Sundayman's Meadow Indian Reserve No. 3, on a creek flowing into Lower Kluskus Lake, 3 mi. E of Middle Euchiniko Lake, 32.40 ha. 53°07′00″N 124°20′00″W
- Tatelkus Lake Indian Reserve No. 28, at north end of Tatelkuz Lake, 125.80 ha. 53°18′00″N 124°43′00″W
- Tsachla Lake Indian Reserve No. 8, on S shore of Tsacha Lake, 64.30 ha. 53°00′00″N 124°54′00″W
- Tzetzi Lake Indian Reserve No. 11, on the West Road River, north shore of Blue (Tzetzi) Lake, 64.70 ha. 52°59′00″N 125°00′00″W
- Upper Kluskus Lake Indian Reserve No. 9, on N shore of Upper Kluskus Lake, 7.40 ha. 53°05′00″N 124°35′00″W
- Yaladelassla Indian Reserve No. 4, N shore of the easterly Euchiniko Lake, 70 ha. 53°09′00″N 124°21′00″W

== Politics ==
In 1973, the government of British Columbia unveiled plans to conduct extensive logging on the lands of Kluskus and Nazko First Nations. For over two years, Kluskus unsuccessfully sought an agreement on cooperative planning that would allow future generations of their peoples to benefit from the extraction of their natural resources. In March 1975, Kluskus and Nazko signed a joint declaration opposing further encroachment on their territories, the watersheds of the Nazko and Blackwater (Tiyakoh) Rivers west of the River to the Ulgatcho Mountains. When the provincial government continued to pursue logging plans, the people of the two first nations held public protests (led by Nazko Band manager Dennis Patrick and Kluskus Chief Roger Jimmie) in Quesnel in 1976.

== See also ==
- Carrier language
- Tsilhqot'in Tribal Council
- Carrier-Sekani Tribal Council
