= Ulkatchotʼen =

First Nations people in British Columbia, Canada

The Ulkatchotʼen or Ulkatchos or Ulkatcho people are a First Nations people in the Chilcotin District of the Canadian province of British Columbia. They are a subgroup of the Dakelh (Carrier) but reside alongside and share governmental institutions with neighbouring communities of Tsilhqotʼin as well as other Dakelh.

Notable Ulkatcho include Carey Price, hockey player, whose mother, Lynda Price is the chief of the Ulkatcho First Nation, the band government of the Ulkachot'en.
