= Respecting Aboriginal Values & Environmental Needs =

Charitable organization in Canada

- Abbreviation: RAVEN
- Formation: 2009
- Registration no.: 85484 0147, US EIN EIN 98-0628334
- Legal status: active charity
- Location: Victoria, British Columbia, Canada
- Region served: Canada
- Services: legal representation, grants
- Official language: English
- Acting Executive Director: Andrea Palframan
- Board President: Jeffrey Nicholls
- Website: raventrust.com

Respecting Aboriginal Values and Environmental Needs (RAVEN) is a charitable organization that works with First Nations across Canada to raise funds to assist Indigenous Peoples in enforcing their rights and title in court to protect their territories.

== Organization ==
RAVEN (Respecting Aboriginal Values and Environmental Needs) is a charitable organization based in Victoria, British Columbia, that provides Indigenous Canadian communities with legal representation and financial support. They are also incorporated as a 501(c)(3) nonprofit organization in the United States. They incorporated in 2009. In 2025, Jeffrey Nicholls is their board president, and Andrea Palframan is their acting executive director.

Susan Smitten previously served as executive director.

== Actions ==
RAVEN raises legal funds to assist Indigenous Peoples in Canada who enforce their rights and title through the courts to protect their traditional territories. Since 2014, the legal actions funded resulted in the quashing of the approval of the Enbridge Northern Gateway pipeline; protection of 83% of the Peel Watershed in the Yukon; halting of mining developments at Teztan Biny (Fish Lake), and T’ak Tl’ah Bin (Morrison Lake); and the cancellation of the Petronas Pacific Northwest LNG project at the mouth of the Skeena River.

Projects the organization has helped to support include:

- Challenges against oil and gas companies: Beaver Lake Cree Nation taking on Alberta and Canada; the Wet’suwet’en legal challenge to stop the Coastal GasLink pipeline through their territory (Central Coast, BC); Heiltsuk Nation’s civil action against US-based Kirby Corporation, British Columbia and Canada over a catastrophic diesel spill in the Great Bear Sea (north-central BC Coast);
- For rivers and rights in Treaty territory: Site C dam campaign with West Moberly First Nations (Treaty 8, BC);
- Mining justice: Gitxaala Nation’s challenge to the BC Mineral Tenure Act to protect Banks Island (North Coast, BC); Neskantaga Nation’s legal challenge to inadequate environmental review in the Ring of Fire mining region (Ontario); Tsilhqot’in Nation’s civil action against Taseko Mines Ltd and BC.

The organization uses crowdfunding to raise money.

RAVEN created "Home on Native Land", a virtual class on environmental justice issues, Canadian history, and Indigenous law. Employing humor as a tool, the ten-video course features comedian Ryan McMahon (Couchiching Anishinaabe).

== See also ==
- Environmental issues in Canada
- Indigenous law
