= Riske Creek =

- Location of Riske Creek in British Columbia
- Coordinates: 51°58′00″N 122°31′00″W
- Country: Canada
- Province: British Columbia
- Area codes: 250, 778

Riske Creek, originally Chilcoten and also Chilcotin, is a ranching and First Nations community located on the Fraser River just southwest of the city of Williams Lake, British Columbia, Canada. It is the location of the offices of the Toosey First Nation, a band government of Tsilhqot'in people in the vicinity, and also of two of the bridges crossing the Fraser. The older bridge, which is a suspension bridge similar to the bridges at Alexandra and Lillooet, was built c.1912 to bring cattle from ranches on the west side of the Fraser to the railways for export, the newer is a concrete-and-steel span built to improve access for logging trucks to the Chilcotin, which is the name of the region on the west side of the Fraser and is now the route of the Chilcotin Highway connecting Williams Lake to Bella Coola.

In the spring of 1944, the Canadian Army established #4 Special Wireless Station presumably to intercept Japanese radio communications. However, the station closed in July of the same year without ever becoming operational.

== Name origin ==
The name is an adaptation of that of Polish immigrant and rancher, L.W. Riskie, who settled here sometime before 1872, and was the first postmaster as of 1886. The post office was then named "Chilcoten" and then renamed "Chilcotin" in 1911, with the current name being adopted in 1912.

== See also ==
- List of crossings of the Fraser River
- Fort Chilcotin
- Chilcotin
