= Ulkatcho First Nation =

Dakelh First Nations government in the Canadian province of British Columbia

Location of Ulkatcho First Nation Band office

Ulkatcho First Nation is a Dakelh First Nations government in the Canadian province of British Columbia. It is a member of the Carrier Chilcotin Tribal Council, and its offices are located in Anahim Lake, British Columbia at the western edge of the Chilcotin District. The Ulkatcho government is responsible for 22 Indian reserves with a population of 729 members living on-reserve, and another 200 living off reserve. Its people are of the Ulkatchot’en ethnic group, a subgroup of the Carrier (Dakelh). Ulkatcho people have intermarried heavily with both Nuxalk and Chilcotin people and share territory in the Coast Range with the Nuxalk. Many distinctively Ulkatcho family names, such as Cahoose, Capoose, Squinas, and Stilas come from Nuxalk. The Chief is known as the Dayi.

== Name ==
The name Ulkatcho is an anglicisation of Ulhk'acho, the name of one village, now disused, on Gatcho Lake. Ulhk'acho means "big bounteous place", a place with bountiful fish, game, and other resources. It is based on the root k'a "fat".

== Chief and councillors ==
=== Current ===
- Chief: Derek Sill
- Bradley Jimmie
- Breanna Charleyboy
- Lorne Cahoose
- Corrine Cahoose

=== Former chiefs ===
- Charlie Williams (2025)
- Lynda Price (2005-2009, 2019-2025)
- Betty Cahoose (2015-2019)
- Zach Parker (2011-2015)
- Allan Weselowski
- Cassidy Sill
- Jimmy Stillas
- Vivan Cahoose

== Reserves ==
The figures following each reserve name are its area, in hectares.

- Abuntlet Lake Indian Reserve No. 4, 129.5 ha.
- Andy Cahoose Meadow Indian Reserve No. 16, 129.5 ha.
- Betty Creek Indian Reserve No. 18, 129.5 ha.
- Blackwater Meadow Indian Reserve No. 11, 57.5 ha.
- Cahoose Indian Reserve No. 10, 198.7 ha.
- Cahoose Indian Reserve No. 12, 64.8 ha.
- Cahoose Indian Reserve No. 8, 259 ha.
- Casimiel Meadows Indian Reserve No. 15A, 64.8 ha.
- Fishtrap Indian Reserve No. 19, 20.2 ha.
- Louis Squinas Ranch Indian Reserve No. 14, 356.3 ha.
- Salmon River Indian Reserve Meadow No. 7, 96.3 ha.
- Squinas Indian Reserve No. 2, 400 ha.
- Thomas Squinas Ranch Indian Reserve No. 2A, 248.5 ha.
- Tilgatko Indian Reserve No. 17, 62.7 ha.
- Towdystan Lake Indian Reserve No. 3, 258.2 ha.
- Uklatcho Indian Reserve No. 6, 129.5 ha.
- Ulkatcho Indian Reserve No. 13, 194 ha.
- Ulkatcho Indian Reserve No. 14A, 256.6 ha.
- Ulkatcho Indian Reserve No. 1, 1 ha.
- Ulkatcho Indian Reserve No. 5, 129.6 ha.
- Willow Meadow Indian Reserve No. 9, 59.5 ha.

== Notable Ulkatcho people ==
- Carey Price, professional ice hockey goaltender and Olympic champion, son of former Chief Lynda Price.
- Jimmy Stillas, former chief whose death was one of the incidents leading to the Cariboo-Chilcotin Justice Inquiry.

== See also ==
- Dakelh
- Carrier language
