= Hanceville, British Columbia =

Community in Chilcotin, British Columbia, Canada

Coordinates: 51°55′10″N 123°02′30″W

Hanceville is about 90 km west of Williams Lake in the Chilcotin District of the Central Interior of British Columbia, Canada. It is the main community of the Stone First Nation band. It is located southeast of Alexis Creek, on the north side of the Chilcotin River.
