= Tsilhqotʼin =

Indigenous people in British Columbia, Canada

Tsilhqotʼin Chilcotin
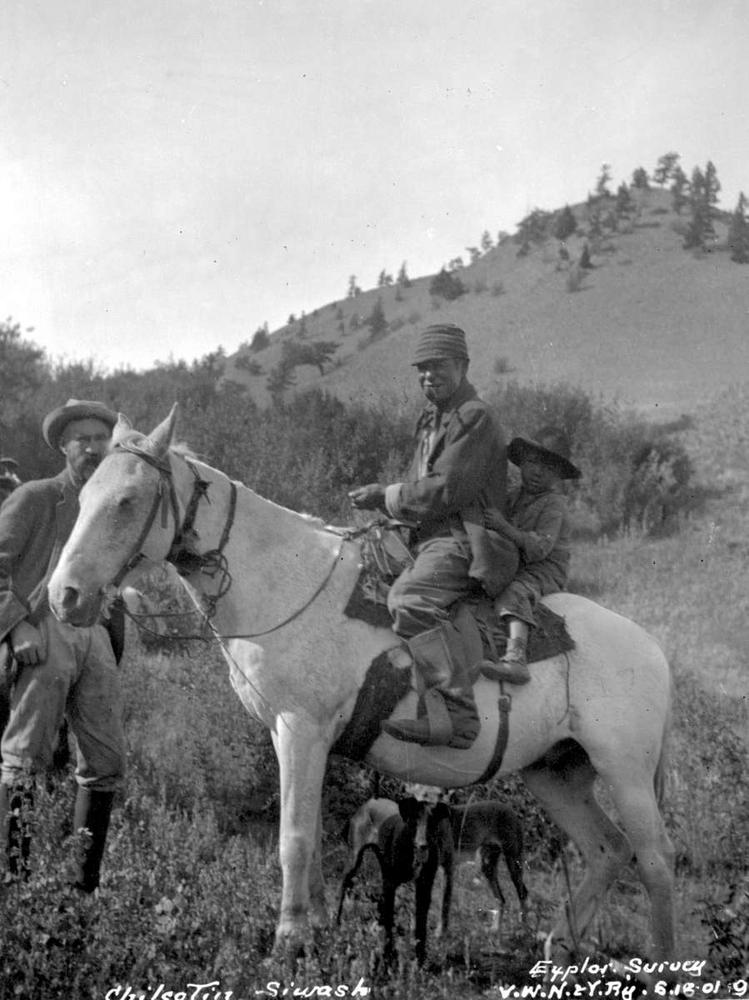
- Tsilhqotʼin man on horse (1901)

Total population
- 4,100 (2008)

Regions with significant populations
- Canada (British Columbia)

Languages
- English, Tsilhqotʼin

Religion
- Christianity, Animism

Related ethnic groups
- Other Dene peoples Especially Dakelh, Wetʼsuwetʼen, and Babine

Tŝilhqóx / Nen "Ochre River"/"Land"
- People: Nenqayni (Tŝilhqotʼin)
- Language: Nenqayni Ch'ih (Tŝilhqotʼin Chʼih)
- Country: Tŝilhqotʼin Nen

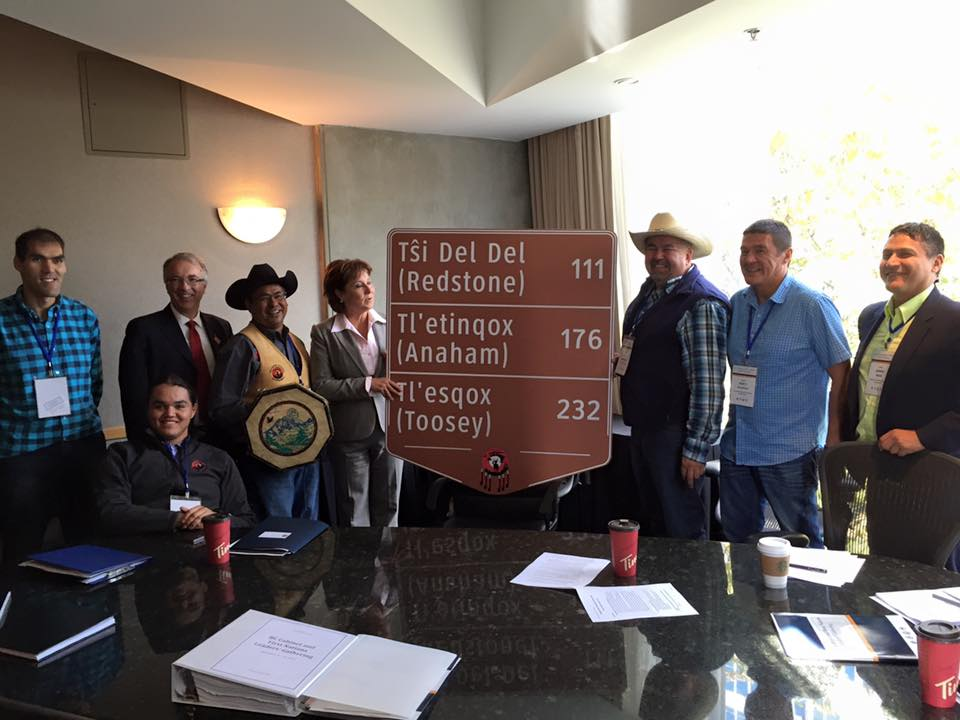
Tsilhqotʼin chiefs pose with new highway signage displaying Tsilhqotʼin community names

The Tsilhqotʼin or Chilcotin ("People of the river", /tʃɪlˈkoʊtɪn/ chil-KOH-tin; also spelled Tsilhqutʼin, Tŝinlhqotʼin, Chilkhodin, Tsilkótin, Tsilkotin) are a North American tribal government of the Athabaskan-speaking ethnolinguistic group that live in what is now known as British Columbia, Canada. They are the most southern of the Athabaskan-speaking Indigenous peoples in British Columbia.

Their name, Tŝilhqotʼin, makes reference to the Chilko River, which means "red ochre river," from tŝi(lh) "rock" + -qu "river" + -t'in "people". Tsilhqot'in people also use another word to refer to themselves: Nenqayni, from: nen "land" + -qay "surface" + -ni "person/people", and their country is called Tŝilhqotʼin Nen.

For more information about the 2014 landmark court case that established Indigenous land title for the Tsilhqotʼin Nation and states that industry and governments must gain consent from the Tsilhqot'in Nation before any extractive industries or activities occur on the portion of Tsilhqot'in lands subject to the declaration of title, see Tsilhqotʼin Nation v British Columbia.

== History ==
=== Pre-contact ===
The Tŝilhqotʼin Nation before contact with Europeans were a strong warrior nation with political influences from the Similkameen region in southern British Columbia, the Pacific coast in the west, and the Rocky Mountains in the east. They were part of an extensive trade network centred around the control and distribution of obsidian, the material of choice for arrowheads and other stone tools.

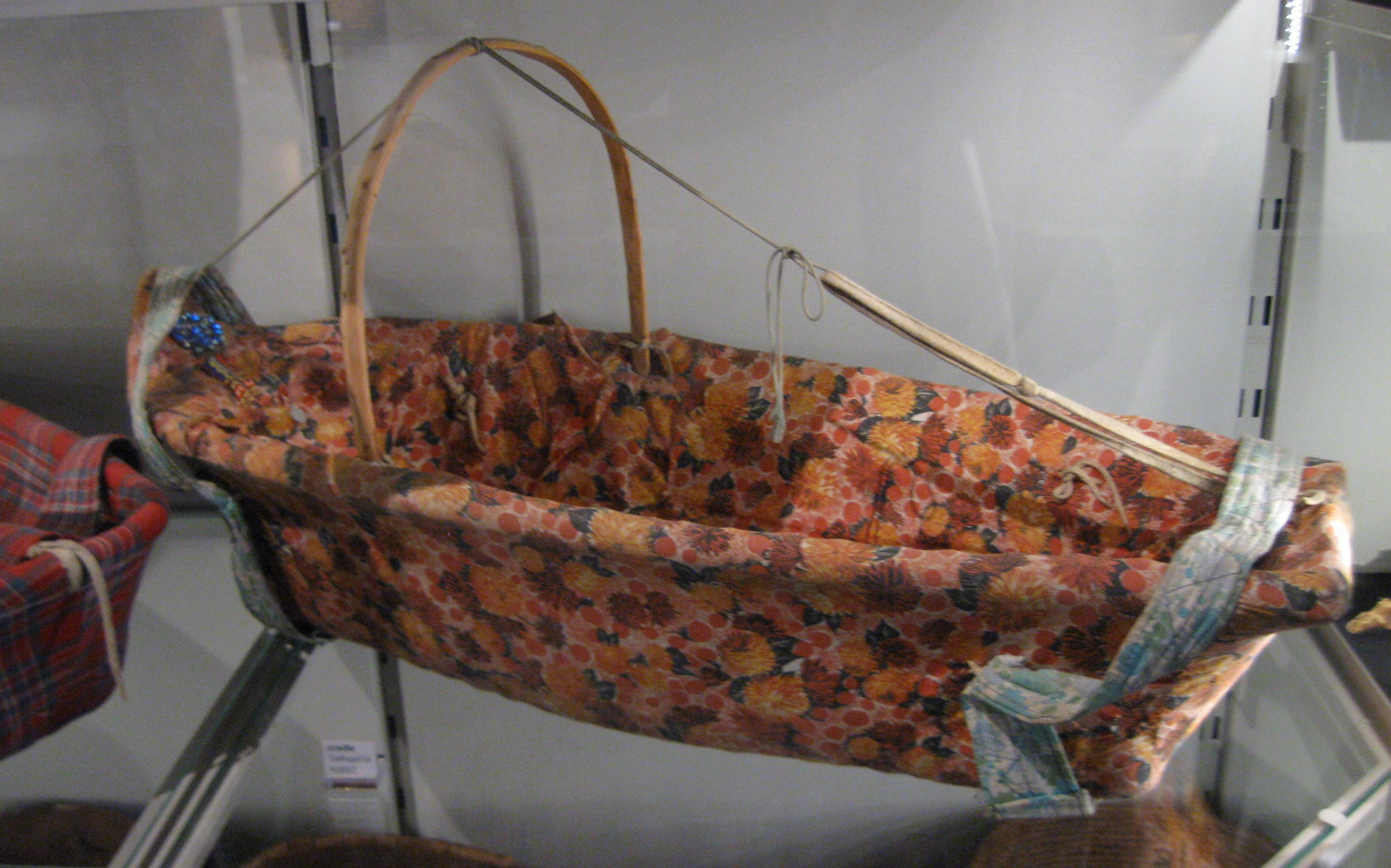
Tsilhqotʼin baby cradle

=== European trade ===
The Tsilhqotʼin first encountered European trading goods in the 1780s and 1790s when British and American ships arrived along the northwest coast seeking sea otter pelts. By 1808, a fur-trading company from Montreal called the North West Company had established posts in the Carrier (Dene) territory just north of the Tsilhqotʼin. They began trading directly and through Carrier intermediaries.

In 1821, what was then the Hudson's Bay Company established a fur trade post at Fort Alexandria on the Fraser River, at the eastern limit of Tsilhqotʼin territory. This became the tribal people's major source for European goods.

=== Disease ===
Contact with Europeans and First Nations intermediaries led to the introduction of Eurasian diseases, which were endemic among the Europeans. As they had long been exposed, some had developed acquired immunity, but the First Nations peoples were devastated by epidemics of these new diseases.

Infectious disease outbreaks with high fatalities for Tsilhqotʼin populations:

- Whooping cough, 1845
- Measles, 1850
- Smallpox, 1855 (from infected blankets from the Thompson River area)
- Smallpox, 1862–1863 (reduced BC aboriginal population by 62% – completely destroyed six Secwepemc bands, a total of 850 people; 2/3 of the Secwepemc population died; half of the 14 Fraser River bands became extinct)
- Spanish flu, 1919 – this epidemic affected European Canadians as well as First Nations, and millions of people died internationally

The geographically isolated position of the Tsilhqotʼin may have protected them from the first of the smallpox epidemics, which spread up from Mexico in the 1770s. They may have been spared the smallpox epidemic of 1800 and the measles of the 1840s. Furniss in The Burden of History states that "there is no direct evidence that these smallpox epidemics reached the central interior of British Columbia or the Secwepemc, Carrier, or Tsilhqotʼin". However, in the epidemic of 1836–38, the disease spread to Ootsa Lake and killed an entire Carrier band. Oral history of the bands has continued to recount the effects of the many deaths in these epidemics.

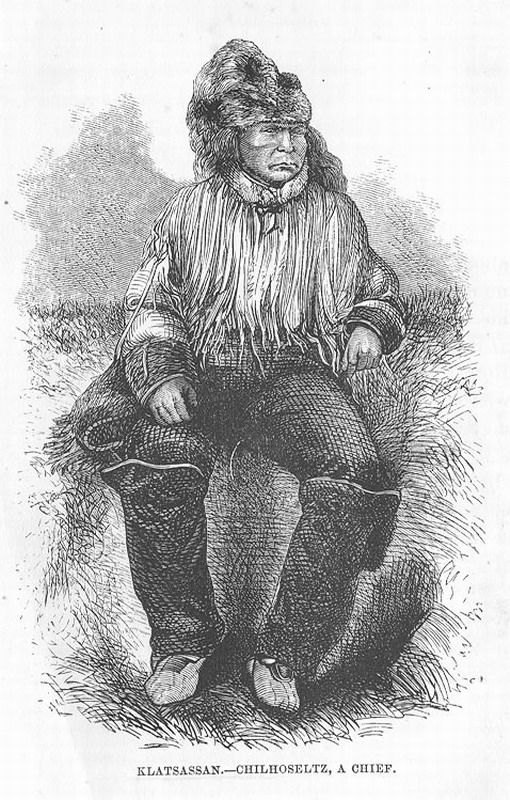
Lhatŝʼaŝʔin (Klatsassin) a chief hanged after the Chilcotin War

=== Gold rush and European settlement ===
By the 1860s, miners panned along the Fraser, Quesnel, and Horsefly rivers and their tributaries. Various business operators and merchants followed the miners and business was booming. Farmers and ranchers developed land to provision the mining towns that developed around the merchants. This led to competition for resources between the Chilcotin and Europeans, leading to a stream of events known as the Chilcotin War.

=== Reserves ===
Governor James Douglas supported a system of reserves and indoctrination to "civilized" practices such as subsistence agriculture up until his retirement in 1864. Joseph Trutch, the chief commissioner of lands and works, abandoned the reserve policy, and set Indian policy as their having no rights to the land. By 1866, BC colonial rule required indigenous peoples to request permission from the governor to use lands. Newspapers supported the preempting of indigenous lands, seeing settlers ploughing indigenous burial grounds. Indigenous peoples who requested redress from a justice of the peace were refused.

=== Environmental problems ===
In the 1870s, the loss of hunting territories, and crashes of the salmon runs placed more dependence on agricultural produce such as grains, hay, and vegetables. Activities migrated to cutting hay, constructing irrigation ditches, and practicing animal husbandry. Settlers however assumed water rights, making agriculture ever more fragile. Indigenous peoples were huddled in on small acreages, such as in Canoe Creek, 20 acres for 150 indigenous people. Starvation became a threat.

=== Canadian government set to reallocate land back to natives ===
In contrast to the 160 to 640 acres per family set aside in other treaties at the time in the prairies, the federal government opted for 80 acres per indigenous family to be set aside in reserve, while the provincial government was keen on 10 acres per family.

=== Catholic missionaries and residential schools ===
Catholic Missionaries were sent to convert First Nations children to Christianity. By 1891, the first group of students were sent to receive a so-called "formal" education. The program continued for the next six decades until a point when Indigenous children were allowed into the public school system. Ninety years after the start of the residential school program, the mission school closed circa 1981. Throughout that period, Indian agents were empowered to remove children from homes to attend St. Joseph's Mission School in Williams Lake, British Columbia. This led some to attempt to hide their children by sneaking out to hunting grounds or fields. Children fled the schools, and within the first 30 years, three investigations on the physical abuse and malnutrition were conducted.

=== Disenfranchisement ===
Voting rights in Canadian federal elections were denied until 1960, and in provincial elections until 1949.

== First Nations communities ==
Today, some 5,000 Tsilhqotʼin people live in Alexandria, north of Williams Lake, and in a string of five communities accessible from Williams Lake on Highway 20 (from east to west), and south from Highway 20 is the Nemiah Valley, and the Xeni-Gwetʼin.

- Toosey First Nation (Tlʼesqox of the Tsilhqotʼin) (offices are located at Riske Creek; Tsilhqotʼin community: Tlʼesqox (Toosey); Tsilhqotʼin band name: Tlʼesqoxtʼin (Tlʼesqox Gwetʼin) = "People at/on Tlʼesqox"; registered population April, 2020: 377)
- Yunesitʼin First Nation (Stone First Nation) (offices at the town of Hanceville, B.C.; Tsilhqotʼin community: Yunesitʼin - "Stone/Stoney", original place-name: Gex Natsʼinilhtʼih; Tsilhqotʼin band name: Yunesitʼin (Yuneŝitʼin Gwetʼin); registered population April, 2020: 491)
- Tlʼetinqox-tʼin Government Office (Anaham Reserve First Nations) (offices east of the town of Alexis Creek; Tsilhqotʼin community: Tlʼetinqox - "the river flats"; Tsilhqotʼin band name: Tlʼetinqox-tʼin (Tlʼetinqox Gwetʼin) - "People of Tlʼetinqox"; registered population April, 2020: 1,631)
- Tŝideldel First Nation (Alexis Creek First Nation) (offices are at Redstone on the main Redstone Reserve; Tsilhqotʼin community: Tsi Del Del - "Red Stone"; Tsilhqotʼin band name: Tŝideldel (Tŝi Deldel Gwetʼin); registered population April, 2020: 703)
- Ulkatcho First Nation (offices at Anahim Lake; mixed Dakelh-Tŝilhqotʼin community, mostly of the Ulkatchotʼen Dakelh subgroup with intermarried Nagwentlʼun-Tsilhqotʼin-subgroup and some Nuxalkmc; registered population April, 2020: 1,065)
- ʔEsdilagh First Nation (Alexandria First Nation) (historic Tsilhqotʼin band name: ʔElhdaqox-tʼin - "People of the Sturgeon River; i.e. Fraser River"; Tsilhqotʼin community: ʔEsdilagh - "where the land meets the water." or "Peninsula"; Tsilhqotʼin band name: ʔEsdilagh-tʼin (ʔEsdinlagh Gwetʼin) - "People of the Peninsula"; registered population April, 2020: 256)
- Xeni Gwetʼin First Nation (offices at the wilderness community and reserve in Nemaia Valley; Tsilhqotʼin community: Xeni Gwet; Tsilhqotʼin band name: Xeni Gwetʼin – "People of Xeni Village"; registered population April, 2020: 454)

Aside from the indigenous communities, there are only two small unincorporated towns in the whole region: Alexis Creek and Anahim Lake, the largest, with 522 people. Numerically, at least, the Tsilhqotʼin still dominate the Chilcotin plateau.

Tsilhqotʼin First Nations belong to two tribal councils:

Carrier-Chilcotin Tribal Council (two Carrier/Dakelh bands, one Tsilhqotʼin band, and one mixed Carrier/Dakelh-Tsilhqotʼin band)

- Kluskus First Nation
- Red Bluff First Nation
- Toosey First Nation (Tlʼesqox of the Tsilhqotʼin)
- Ulkatcho First Nation

Tsilhqotʼin National Government (all Tsilhqotʼin bands without the mixed Carrier/Dakelh-Tsilhqotʼin band)

- ʔEsdilagh First Nation (Alexandria First Nation)
- Tŝideldel First Nation (Alexis Creek First Nation)
- Yunesitʼin First Nation (Stone First Nation)
- Tlʼetinqox-tʼin Government Office (Anaham Reserve First Nations)
- Xeni Gwetʼin First Nation
- Toosey First Nation (Tlʼesqox of the Tsilhqotʼin)

Despite its small population and isolation, the region has produced a relatively large collection of literature mixing naturalism with Indigenous and settler cultures. The area is accessed by Highway 20, which runs from the City of Williams Lake to the port town of Bella Coola. Highway 20 westbound from Williams Lake crosses the Fraser River at Sheep Creek - thereby entering Tsilhqotʼin traditional territory. The highway passes over the Chilcotin Plateau, characterized by undulating grasslands, expansive forests of lodgepole pine and Douglas fir, a scattering of lakes, rivers, creeks and ponds, volcanic and glaciated landforms, and a backdrop of snow-covered peaks.

== See also ==
- Tsilhqotʼin language
- Chilcotin War
- Carrier Chilcotin Tribal Council
- Tsilhqotʼin Tribal Council
- Tsilhqotʼin Nation v. British Columbia

== Bibliography ==
- Nemiah: The Unconquered Country by Terry Glavin
- Chilcotin Cowboy by Paul St. Pierre
- Smith and Other Events by Paul St. Pierre
- Crusoe of Lonesome Lake by Ralph Edwards (conservationist)
- Chiwid by Sage Birchwater
- The Chilcotin War by Mel Rothenburger
- High Slack: Waddington's Gold Road and the Bute Inlet Massacre of 1864 by Judith Williams
