= British Columbia Highway 20 =

Highway in British Columbia

Highway 20
- Chilcotin-Bella Coola Highway
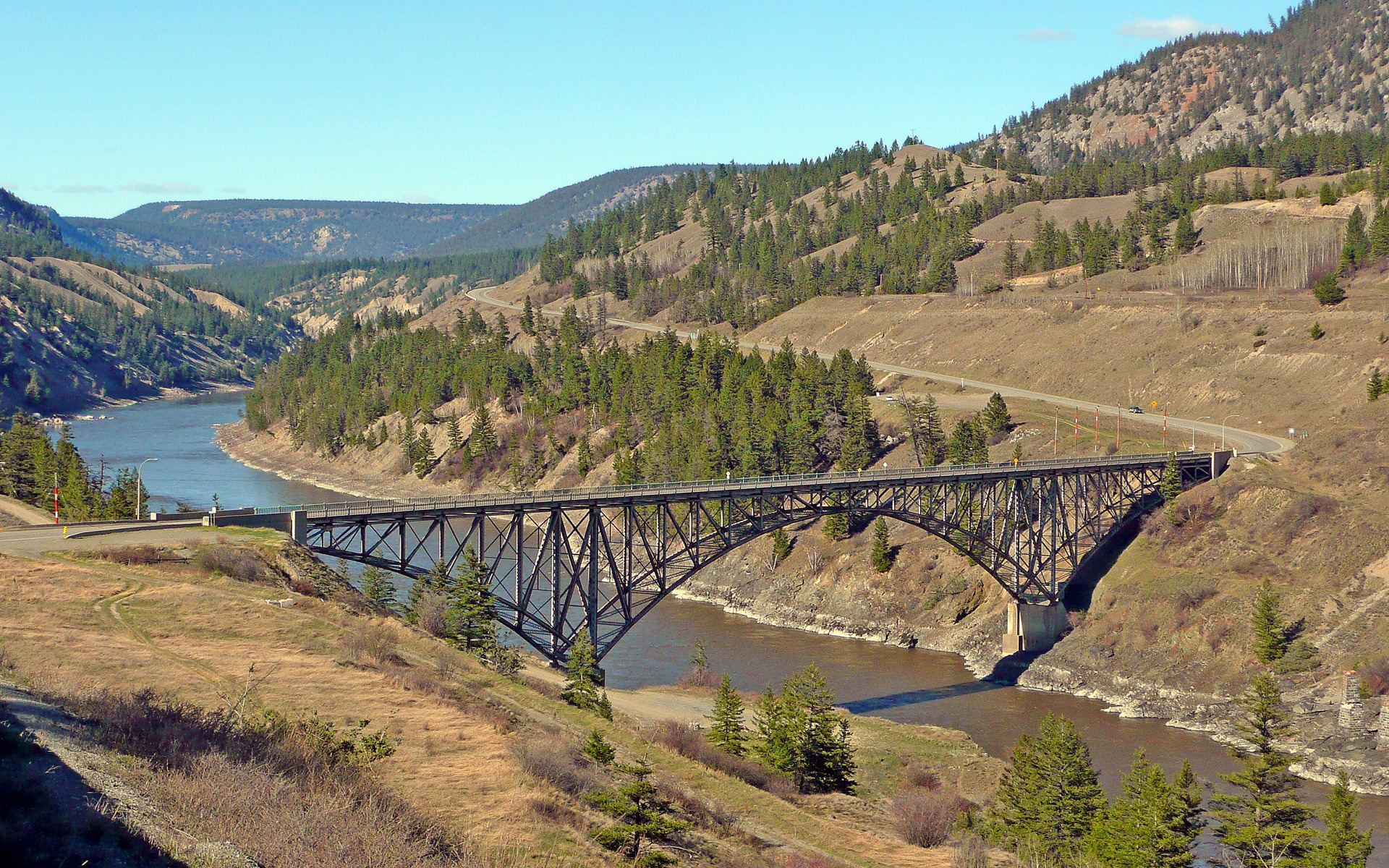

Route information
- Maintained by the Ministry of Transportation and Infrastructure
- Length: 454.94 km (282.69 mi)
- Existed: 1953–present

Major junctions
- West end: Bella Coola ferry terminal
- East end: Highway 97 in Williams Lake

Location
- Country: Canada
- Province: British Columbia

Highway system
- British Columbia provincial highways
← Highway 19A	→ Highway 21

Highway 20, also known as the Chilcotin Highway, and officially dubbed the Alexander MacKenzie Highway, is one of the two main east–west routes in the Central Interior of British Columbia, the other being Highway 16 (the Yellowhead Highway). The Chilcotin Highway runs 457 km (284 mi) from Williams Lake westward through the Chilcotin region to North Bentinck Arm, an inlet of the Pacific Ocean where the town of Bella Coola is located. As of 2019, all but 42 km (26 mi) has been paved, mostly for expediting the removal of timber from the region, which, like most of British Columbia, is afflicted with pine beetle infestations. Logging traffic and ranch-related traffic on the route can be expected.

Highway 20 is famous for the portion of the westernmost stretch next to Young Creek Canyon, between Anahim Lake and Bella Coola, known as the Hill or The Precipice. From the point where the road crosses the Coast Range via Heckman Pass in Tweedsmuir South Provincial Park at an elevation of 1,524 m (5,000 ft) the road descends 43 km (27 mi) of steep, narrow road with sharp hairpin turns and two major switchbacks to the Bella Coola Valley. The descent includes a 9 km (5.6 mi) section with grades of up to 18% (about 1 in 6). The road is winding, in some places only wide enough for one vehicle, and in many places bordered on one side by cliffs, and on the other side by a drop of up to 320 m (1,050 ft), unprotected by guardrails. Tourists who have driven to Bella Coola from Williams Lake have been known to refuse to drive back and have had to be taken out by boat or float plane.

Until 1953 Highway 20 ended at Anahim Lake, 137 km (85 mi) from Bella Coola. The province considered the terrain too difficult and refused to extend it, leaving Bella Coola inaccessible by road. The road, known at the time as the "Freedom Road", was completed by local volunteers working from opposite ends with two bulldozers and supplies bought on credit. The two bulldozers met each other on the 26th of September 1953 and an official opening ceremony was held on the 18th of July 1955.

== Route description ==
Highway 20 is scenic and very sparsely populated. It begins in Williams Lake at its juncture with Highway 97. It rises gradually for 23 km (14 mi) to the crossing of the Fraser River at Sheep Creek Bridge, from which it ascends via a series of steep switchbacks to the Chilcotin Plateau. Prior to improvements of the late 20th Century, including the Sheep Creek Bridge, it crossed the Fraser via a 1910s style suspension bridge, which was like those farther south at Gang Ranch-Dog Creek and Lillooet.

At 36 km (22 mi) it passes the site of the Williams Lake LORAN-C Tower, part of the maritime navigation system. This tower was dismantled in October 2011.

At 52 km (32 mi) it passes through Riske Creek (population 165) then at 94 km (58 mi) the hamlet of Hanceville (population 68).

Around 104 km (65 mi) it passes Anaham Reserve, a Chilcotin community before reaching Alexis Creek (population 317) at 114 km (71 mi). From Alexis Creek it is 122 km (76 mi) to the next town, Tatla Lake (population 147).

54 km (34 mi) farther West is Nimpo Lake which serves as a float plane base for the region. Just west of Nimpo Lake the highway crosses the Dean River before reaching Anahim Lake (population 163) and the adjacent Indian reserve at 310 km (190 mi). 35 km (22 mi) west of Anahim Lake, the highway enters Tweedsmuir South Provincial Park, and 6.2 km (3.9 mi) later, it crosses into the Central Coast Regional District at Heckman Pass. After the 20 km (12 mi)-long steep section alongside Young Creek Canyon, the highway meets the Atnarko River, and follows it west for 18 km (11 mi) to where the Atnarko merges with the Talchako River to form the Bella Coola River. Highway 20 then follows the Bella Coola River for 10 km (6.2 mi) to a bridge over Burnt Bridge Creek, at which point it exits the Park. After continuing to follow the Bella Coola River for another 27 km (17 mi), the highway reaches Hagensborg, then another 20 km (12 mi) to the centre of Bella Coola (population 2500), and then another 4.8 km (3.0 mi) to the BC Ferry terminal.

== Major intersections ==
Regional District	Location	km	mi	Destinations	Notes
Inside Passage				BC Ferries to Bella Bella, Port Hardy, and Ocean Falls	
Central Coast	Bella Coola	0.00	0.00	Bella Coola ferry terminal	Highway 20 western terminus
Central Coast	Tweedsmuir South Provincial Park	87.76	54.53	Heckman Pass – elevation 1,524 m (5,000 ft)	
Cariboo	Anahim Lake	138.33	85.95		
Cariboo	Tatla Lake	233.51	145.10		
Cariboo	Alexis Creek	343.06	213.17		
Cariboo		421.66	262.01	Chilcotin-Meldrum Road (Highway 907:1555 north) – Meldrum Creek	
Cariboo		430.38	267.43	Chilcotin Bridge (Sheep Creek Bridge) crosses the Fraser River	
Cariboo	Williams Lake	454.94	282.69	Highway 97 / Oliver Street – City Centre, Prince George, Cache Creek	Highway 20 eastern terminus
1.000 mi = 1.609 km; 1.000 km = 0.621 mi: Tolled

== Gallery ==
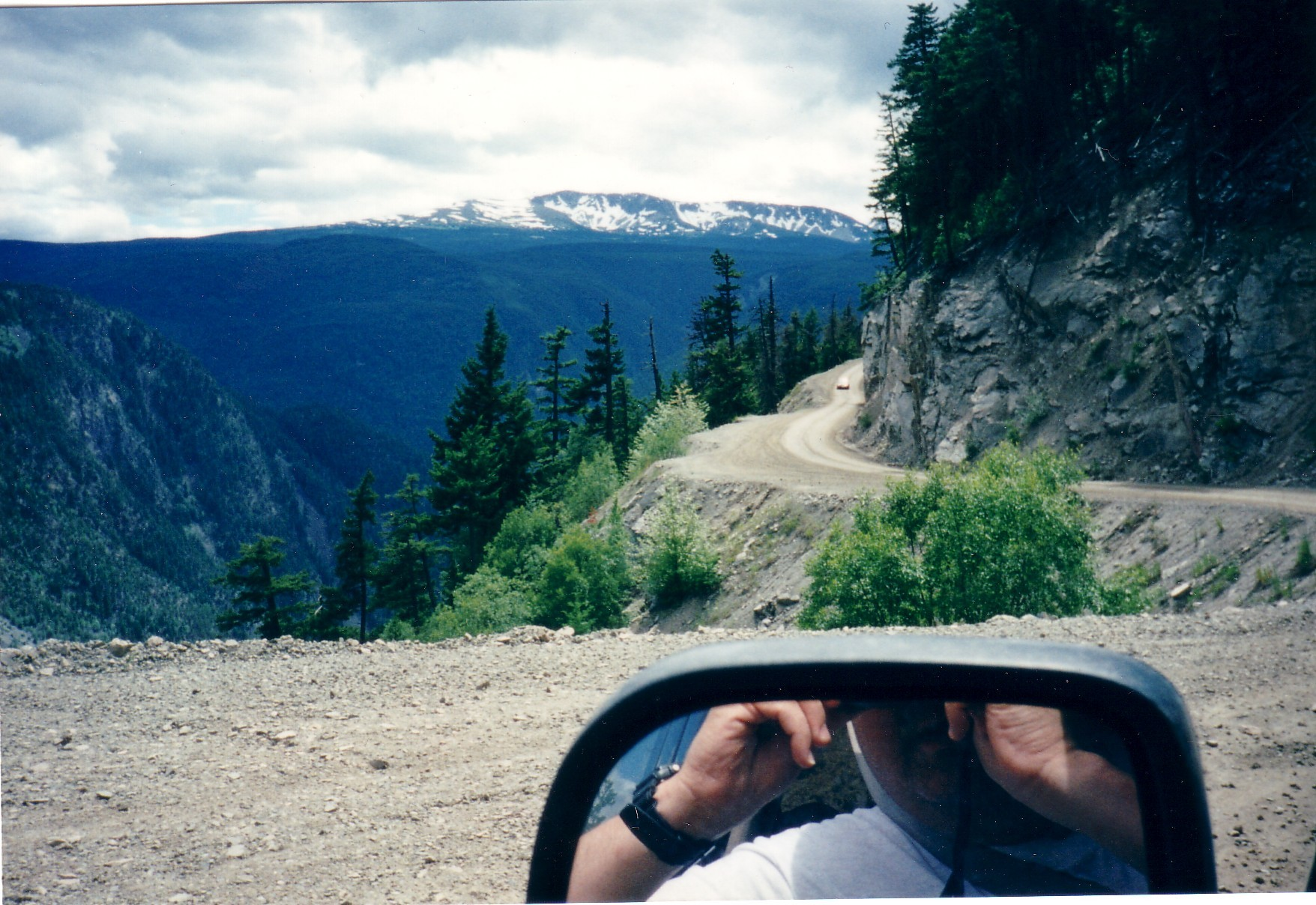
Descending Bella Coola Hill

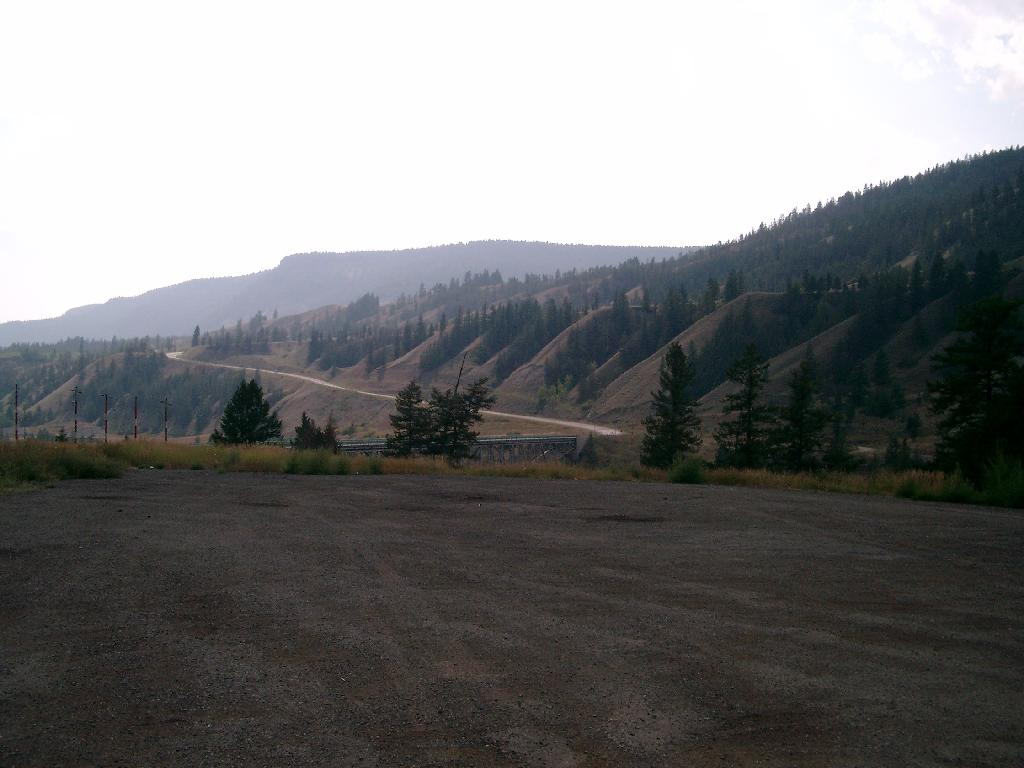
Sheep Creek Bridge across the Fraser River

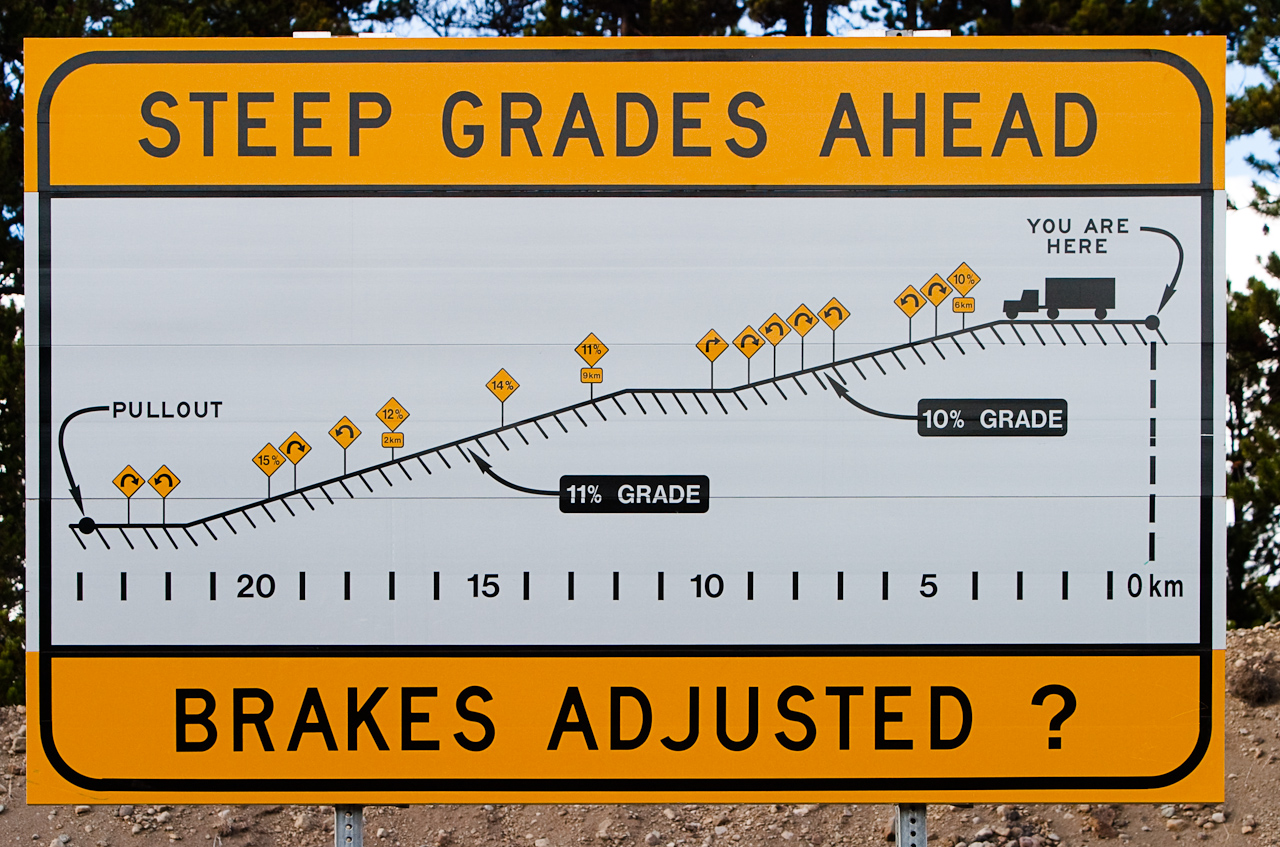
Warning sign on pullout at the top of The Hill

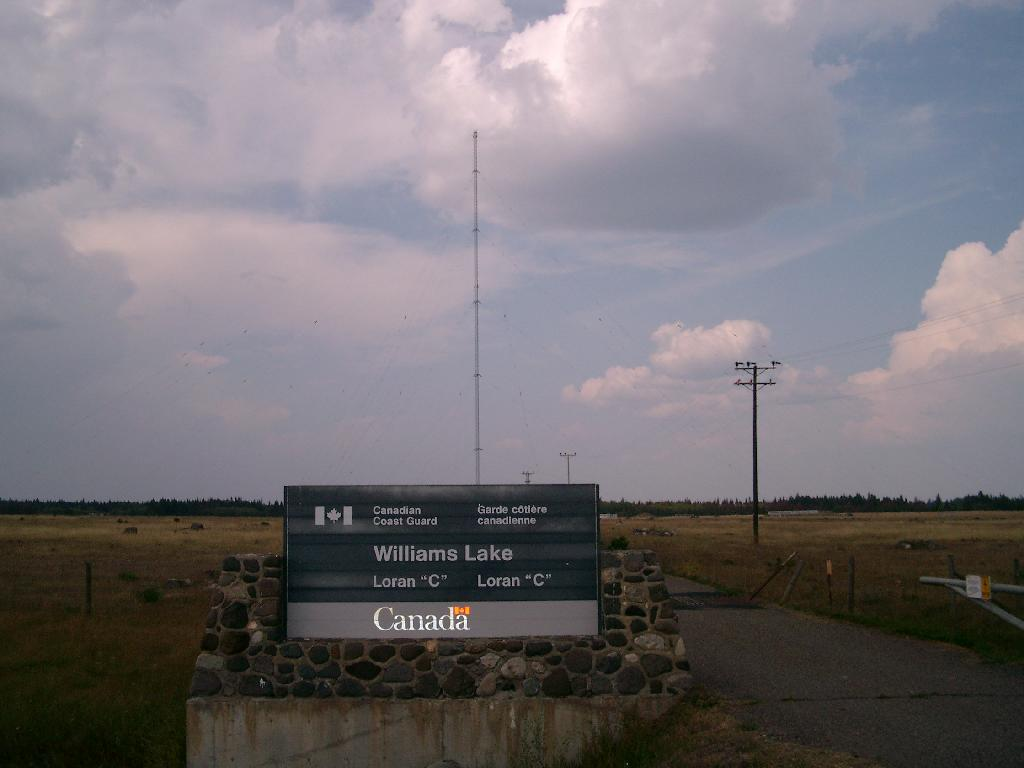
The LORAN-C Station near Riske Creek

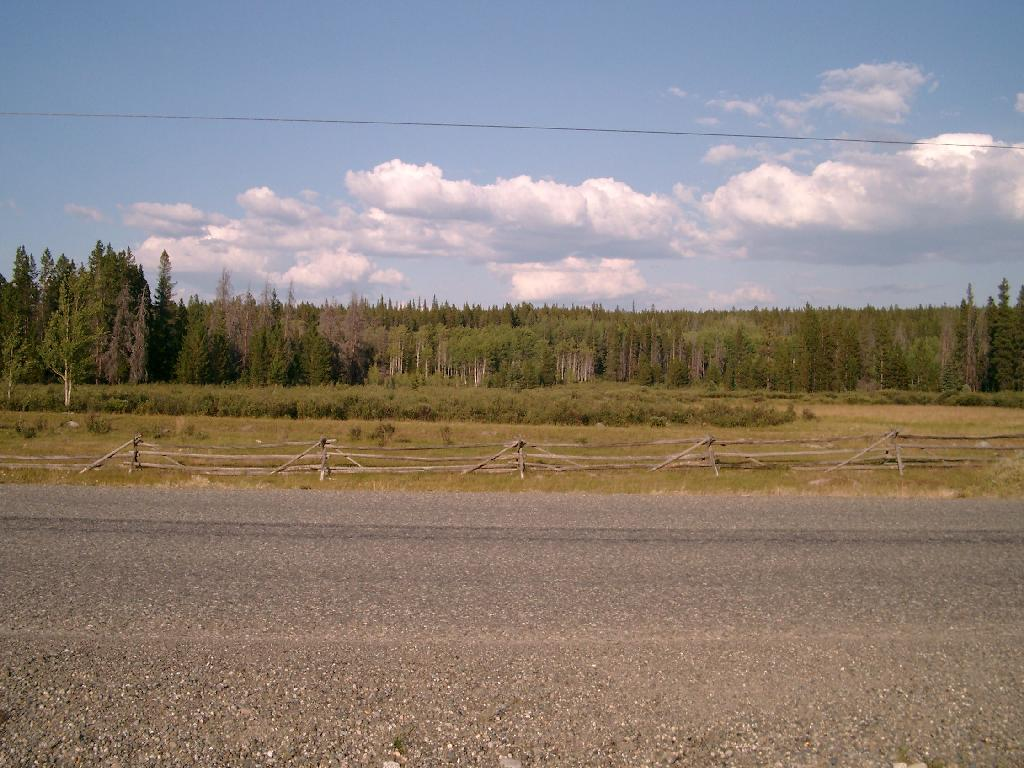
Near Riske Creek

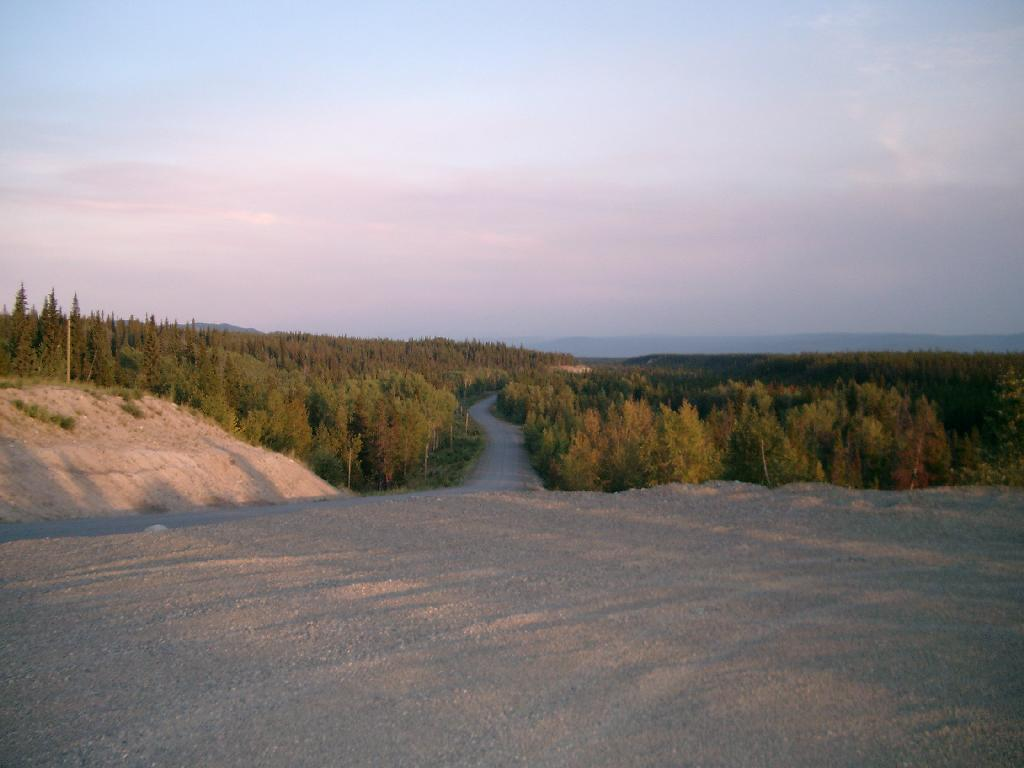
Looking East between Kleena Kleene and Nimpo Lake

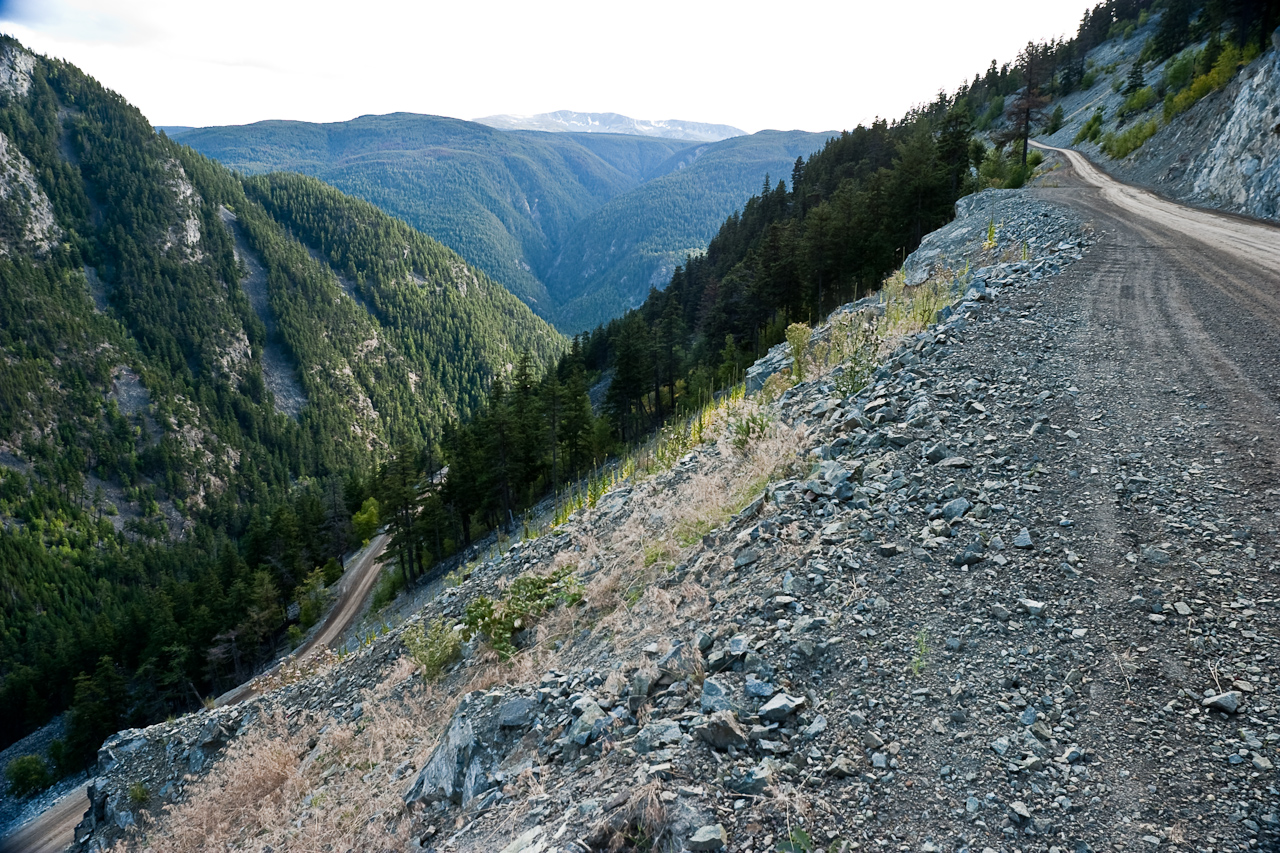
View from the top of the Hill
