= Anahim Lake =

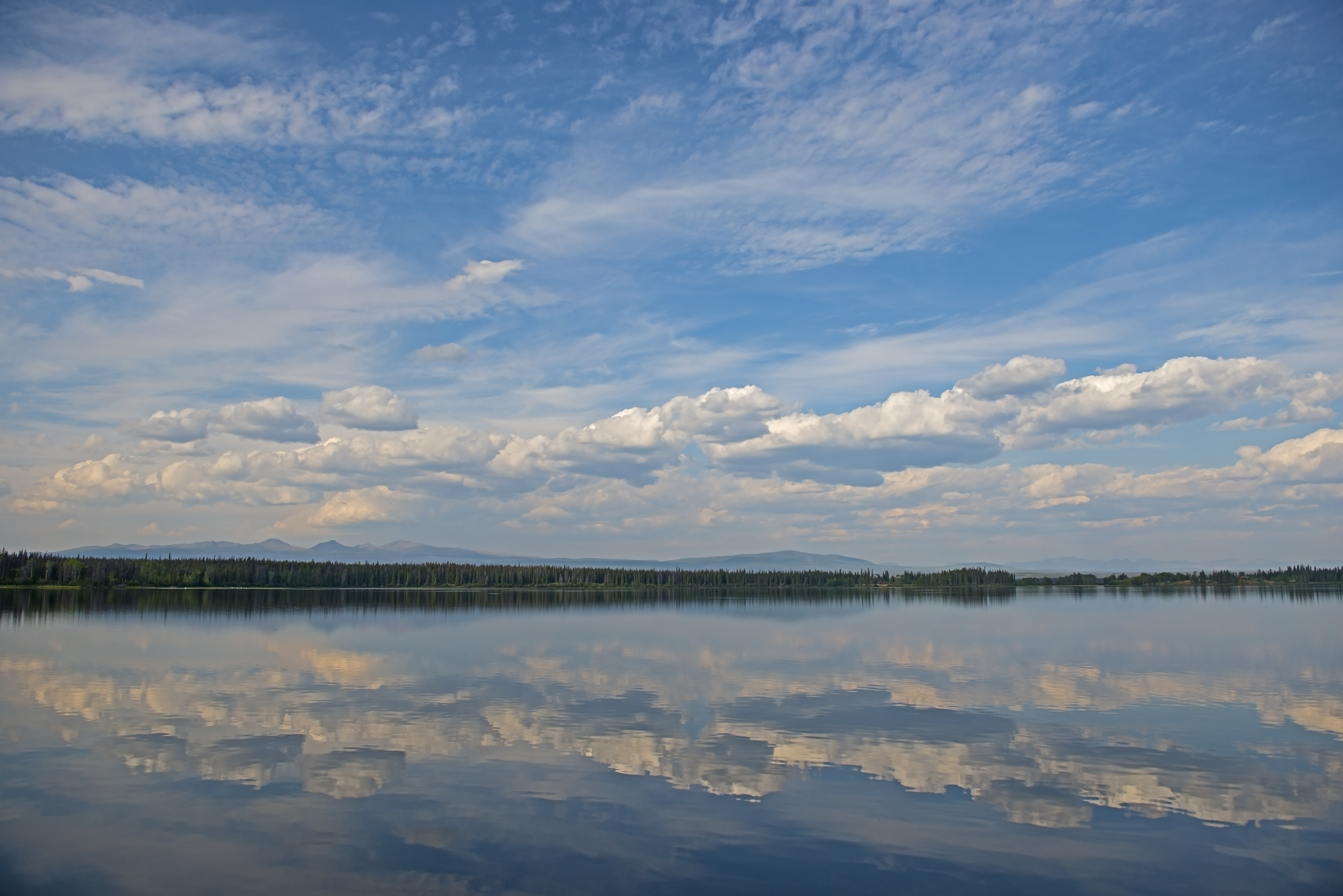
- Anahim Lake, Canada

- Location within British Columbia
- Coordinates: 52°28′00″N 125°19′00″W
- Country: Canada
- Province: British Columbia

Population
  - Total: 1,500

The subject of this article should not be confused with Anaham, which is a different community located nine kilometres east of Alexis Creek, British Columbia, which is in the same area.

Anahim Lake is a small community in British Columbia. The village and surrounding areas (including nearby Nimpo Lake) have a population of approximately 1500. The Ulkatcho First Nation has 729 people living on nearby reserves. Every July, the Anahim Lake Stampede showcases local talent and is the area's major social event. Anahim Lake supports three general stores, one motel, a restaurant, and an RCMP detachment. It is situated on Highway 20, 320 km west of Williams Lake, 140 km east of Bella Coola.

One major industry of Anahim Lake is forestry. This industry has been hurt by the pine beetle epidemic sweeping through Western Canada. In the summer of 2006, the lumber mill of Anahim Lake closed down and laid off dozens of mill workers. However, the mill has recently re-opened at half capacity. Other local industries include cattle farming, sport fishing, and mushroom picking. The area is famous for its numerous world-class fresh water fishing lodges and resorts that bring in enthusiasts from around the world.

Anahim Lake is home to National Hockey League Vezina Trophy winner and Olympic gold medalist Carey Price of the Montreal Canadiens.

Anahim Lake Elementary Jr. Secondary is a public school that is part of School District #27 that serves students from Kindergarten to Grade 10. The school has been in use since it was built in 2006. The current principal of the school is Mr. Thomas J Pak.

Anahim Lake Station of the British Columbia Ambulance Service provides emergency medical services and provides medical transfers from the Ulkatcho Nursing Station. BCEHS employs individuals from the local area as primary care paramedics, emergency medical responders, and some drivers.

Anahim Lake is the namesake for the Anahim Volcanic Belt, Anahim hotspot and Anahim Peak.

== Climate ==
Climate data for Anahim Lake, BC (1991–2020 normals)
Month	Jan	Feb	Mar	Apr	May	Jun	Jul	Aug	Sep	Oct	Nov	Dec	Year
Mean daily maximum °C (°F)	−3.0 (26.6)	0.1 (32.2)	4.2 (39.6)	8.5 (47.3)	14.4 (57.9)	17.6 (63.7)	20.8 (69.4)	21.1 (70.0)	16.5 (61.7)	8.1 (46.6)	1.2 (34.2)	−3.8 (25.2)	8.8 (47.8)
Daily mean °C (°F)	−9.8 (14.4)	−7.0 (19.4)	−3.6 (25.5)	1.7 (35.1)	6.5 (43.7)	9.8 (49.6)	12.2 (54.0)	11.7 (53.1)	7.6 (45.7)	1.7 (35.1)	−4.4 (24.1)	−9.8 (14.4)	1.4 (34.5)
Mean daily minimum °C (°F)	−16.6 (2.1)	−14.2 (6.4)	−11.5 (11.3)	−5.1 (22.8)	−1.3 (29.7)	2.1 (35.8)	3.7 (38.7)	2.2 (36.0)	−1.2 (29.8)	−4.8 (23.4)	−10.0 (14.0)	−15.8 (3.6)	−6.1 (21.0)
