= Alexis Creek, British Columbia =

Settlement in British Columbia, Canada

Alexis Creek
- Unincorporated place
- Location of Alexis Creek in British Columbia
- Coordinates: 52°05′03″N 123°16′42″W
- Country: Canada
- Province: British Columbia
- Region: Cariboo
- Regional district: Cariboo

Area
  - Land: 1.91 km^{2} (0.74 sq mi)

Population (2021)
  - Total: 53
  - Density: 27.7/km^{2} (72/sq mi)
- Postal Codes: V0L 1A0
- Area codes: 250, 778, 236, & 672
- Highways: Highway 20

Alexis Creek is an unincorporated community in the Chilcotin District of the western Central Interior of the Canadian province of British Columbia, on Highway 20 between Williams Lake and Bella Coola. The creek is named, like the adjacent lake of the same name, for a colonial-era chief of the Tsilhqot'in people, Alexis, who figured in the story of the Chilcotin War of 1864 (though as a non-combatant).

The small unincorporated settlement of Alexis Creek has the following services: British Columbia Forestry Service (now BC Ministry of Forests, Lands, Natural Resources Operations, and Rural Development) field office, the Alexis Creek School (elementary grades), a highways maintenance yard, a small detachment of the Royal Canadian Mounted Police, the Happy Eater restaurant, the Doodle Bugs café, Doug's Repair (automotive servicing, parts, tires, and supplies), a provincial medical clinic (operated by Interior Health), the Alexis Creek General Store (groceries, sundries, mailboxes), and a dispatch station of the British Columbia Ambulance Service.[Both the Happy Eater restaurant and the Doodlebug cafe have burnt down in recent years. There are no longer any dining options in Alexis Creek. There is, however, a tourist information kiosk with public outhouses open seasonally and staffed by volunteers.]

Since the early 2000s, Alexis Creek has also been home to the Ravens Unit Crew, originally an all-first-nations wildland fire crew. All of the crew members live in the community seasonally and comprise the only permanently stationed, professional fire crew west of the Fraser River.

== Climate ==
Climate data for Alexis Creek
Month	Jan	Feb	Mar	Apr	May	Jun	Jul	Aug	Sep	Oct	Nov	Dec	Year
Record high °C (°F)	13.5 (56.3)	16.5 (61.7)	21.0 (69.8)	25.0 (77.0)	36.0 (96.8)	34.0 (93.2)	35.5 (95.9)	34.0 (93.2)	36.5 (97.7)	28.5 (83.3)	17.0 (62.6)	11.5 (52.7)	36.5 (97.7)
Mean daily maximum °C (°F)	−4.1 (24.6)	0.6 (33.1)	8.3 (46.9)	13.5 (56.3)	18.4 (65.1)	21.4 (70.5)	24.0 (75.2)	24.3 (75.7)	19.5 (67.1)	11.1 (52.0)	1.2 (34.2)	−5.0 (23.0)	11.1 (52.0)
Daily mean °C (°F)	−8.6 (16.5)	−5.3 (22.5)	1.1 (34.0)	5.6 (42.1)	10.4 (50.7)	13.8 (56.8)	15.9 (60.6)	15.7 (60.3)	11.1 (52.0)	4.5 (40.1)	−3.4 (25.9)	−9.4 (15.1)	4.3 (39.7)
Mean daily minimum °C (°F)	−13.0 (8.6)	−11.2 (11.8)	−6.1 (21.0)	−2.3 (27.9)	2.4 (36.3)	6.1 (43.0)	7.8 (46.0)	7.0 (44.6)	2.7 (36.9)	−2.2 (28.0)	−7.9 (17.8)	−13.8 (7.2)	−2.6 (27.3)
Record low °C (°F)	−40.0 (−40.0)	−38.5 (−37.3)	−31.0 (−23.8)	−12.5 (9.5)	−8.0 (17.6)	−3.0 (26.6)	0.5 (32.9)	−4.0 (24.8)	−8.0 (17.6)	−31.5 (−24.7)	−43.0 (−45.4)	−43.0 (−45.4)	−43.0 (−45.4)
Average precipitation mm (inches)	19.8 (0.78)	8.7 (0.34)	6.1 (0.24)	14.2 (0.56)	29.7 (1.17)	57.6 (2.27)	49.2 (1.94)	35.0 (1.38)	31.2 (1.23)	27.4 (1.08)	25.3 (1.00)	26.8 (1.06)	330.9 (13.03)
Average rainfall mm (inches)	0.8 (0.03)	0.7 (0.03)	2.6 (0.10)	12.1 (0.48)	29.2 (1.15)	57.6 (2.27)	49.2 (1.94)	35.0 (1.38)	30.7 (1.21)	23.6 (0.93)	7.0 (0.28)	0.6 (0.02)	249.1 (9.81)
Average snowfall cm (inches)	19.0 (7.5)	8.0 (3.1)	3.5 (1.4)	2.1 (0.8)	0.5 (0.2)	0.0 (0.0)	0.0 (0.0)	0.0 (0.0)	0.5 (0.2)	3.8 (1.5)	18.3 (7.2)	26.3 (10.4)	81.9 (32.2)
Average precipitation days (≥ 0.2 mm)	8.7	6.0	4.5	7.5	11.6	15.1	15.0	10.6	11.0	9.4	8.9	9.4	117.7
Average rainy days (≥ 0.2 mm)	0.7	0.7	2.0	6.7	11.5	15.1	15.0	10.6	11.0	8.1	3.3	0.6	85.2
Average snowy days (≥ 0.2 cm)	8.0	5.4	2.8	1.7	0.7	0.0	0.0	0.0	0.2	2.0	6.4	9.0	36.1

== See also ==
- Alexis Creek First Nation (Chilanko Forks)
- Tl'etinqox-t'in Government Office (located in Alexis Creek)
