= Tsilhqotʼin language =

Northern Athabaskan language of British Columbia

Chilcotin
- Tŝilhqotʼin
- Pronunciation: [tsˤʰᵊiɬqʰotʼin]
- Native to: Canada
- Region: Chilcotin Country, Central Interior of British Columbia
- Ethnicity: 4,350 Tsilhqotʼin (2014, FPCC)
- Native speakers: 630 (2021 census)
- Language family: Na-Dené: Athabaskan; Northern Athabaskan; Chilcotin

Language codes
- ISO 639-3: clc
- Glottolog: chil1280
- ELP: Tsilhqot'in (Chilcotin)
- Chilcotin is classified as Definitely Endangered by the UNESCO Atlas of the World's Languages in Danger.

Tŝilhqóx / Nen "Ochre River"/"Land"
- People: Nenqayni (Tŝilhqotʼin)
- Language: Nenqayni Ch'ih (Tŝilhqotʼin Chʼih)
- Country: Tŝilhqotʼin Nen

Chilcotin or Tŝilhqotʼin is a Northern Athabaskan language spoken in British Columbia by the Tsilhqotʼin people.

== Name ==
The name Chilcotin is the anglicized form of the Chilcotin name for themselves, Tŝilhqotʼin, literally "people of the red ochre river". It has many variations in pronunciation and in spelling : Tsilhqotʼin, Tsilhqútʼin, Tsinlhqut’in, Tŝinlhqut’in. The form Tŝilhqut’in was considered the correct spelling in the 1970s, the form Tŝilhqot’in is the most commonly used in 2021. The people also call themselves Nenqayni ("people of the Earth", "people of the world", meaning "Native") and also call the language Nenqayni Chʼih (lit. "the Native way").

== Phonology ==
=== Consonants ===
Chilcotin has 47 consonants, likely the largest number within the Athabaskan family:

		Bilabial	Dental			Alveolar	Palatal	Velar		Uvular		Glottal
		Bilabial	median	sibilant	lateral	Alveolar	Palatal	plain	labial	plain	labial	Glottal
Nasal		m ⟨m⟩	n̪ ⟨n⟩									
Occlusive	tenuis	p ⟨b⟩	t̪ ⟨d⟩	ts̪ ⟨dz⟩	tɬ ⟨dl⟩	tsˤ ⟨dẑ⟩	tʃ ⟨j⟩	k ⟨g⟩	kʷ ⟨gw⟩	q ⟨gg⟩	qʷ ⟨ggw⟩	ʔ ⟨ʔ⟩
Occlusive	aspirated	pʰ ⟨p⟩	t̪ʰ ⟨t⟩	ts̪ʰ ⟨ts⟩	tɬʰ ⟨tl⟩	tsˤʰ ⟨tŝ⟩	tʃʰ ⟨ch⟩	kʰ ⟨k⟩	kʷʰ ⟨kw⟩	qʰ ⟨q⟩	qʷʰ ⟨qw⟩	ʔ ⟨ʔ⟩
Occlusive	ejective		t̪ʼ ⟨tʼ⟩	ts̪ʼ ⟨tsʼ⟩	tɬʼ ⟨tlʼ⟩	tsˤʼ ⟨tŝʼ⟩	tʃʼ ⟨chʼ⟩	kʼ ⟨kʼ⟩	kʷʼ ⟨kwʼ⟩	qʼ ⟨qʼ⟩	qʷʼ ⟨qwʼ⟩	ʔ ⟨ʔ⟩
Continuant	voiceless			s̪ ⟨s⟩	ɬ ⟨lh⟩	sˤ ⟨ŝ⟩	ʃ ⟨sh⟩		xʷ ⟨wh⟩	χ ⟨x⟩	χʷ ⟨xw⟩	h ⟨h⟩
Continuant	voiced			z̪ ⟨z⟩	l ⟨l⟩	zˤ ⟨ẑ⟩	j ⟨y⟩		w ⟨w⟩	ʁ ⟨r⟩	ʁʷ ⟨rw⟩	

- Like many other Athabaskan languages, Chilcotin does not have a contrast between fricatives and approximants.
- The alveolar series is pharyngealized.
- Dentals and alveolars:
  - Both Krauss (1975) and Cook (1993) describe the dental and alveolar as being essentially identical in articulation, postdental, with the only differentiating factor being their different behaviours in the vowel flattening processes (described below).
  - Gafos (1999, personal communication with Cook) describes the dental series as apico-laminal denti-alveolar and the alveolar series as lamino-postalveolar.

=== Vowels ===
Chilcotin has 6 vowels:

	Front		Central		Back	
	tense-long	lax-short	tense-long	lax-short	tense-long	lax-short
High	i ⟨i⟩	ɪ ⟨ɨ⟩			u ⟨u⟩	ʊ ⟨o⟩
Low			æ ⟨a⟩	ɛ ⟨e⟩		

- Chilcotin has both tense and lax vowel phonemes. Additionally, tense vowels may become lax from vowel laxing.

Every given Chilcotin vowel has a number of different phonetic realizations from complex phonological processes (such as nasalization, laxing, flattening). For instance, the vowel /i/ can be variously pronounced [i, ĩ, ɪ, e, ᵊi, ᵊĩ, ᵊɪ].

=== Tone ===
Chilcotin is a tonal language with two tones: high tone and low tone.

=== Phonological processes ===
Chilcotin has vowel flattening and consonant harmony. Consonant harmony (sibilant harmony) is rather common in the Athabaskan language family. Vowel flattening is unique to Chilcotin but is similar to phonological processes in other unrelated Interior Salishan languages spoken in the same area, such as Shuswap, Stʼátʼimcets, and Thompson River Salish (and thus was probably borrowed into Chilcotin). That type of harmony is an areal feature common in this region of North America. The Chilcotin processes, however, are much more complicated.

==== Vowel nasalization and laxing ====
Vowel nasalization is a phonological process by which the phoneme /n/ is nasalizes the preceding vowel. It occurs when the vowel + /n/ sequence is followed by a (tautosyllabic) continuant consonant (such as /ɬ, sˤ, zˤ, ç, j, χ/).

/pinɬ/	→	[pĩɬ]	'trap'

Vowel laxing is a process by which tense vowels (/i, u, æ/) become lax when followed by a syllable-final /h/: the tense and lax distinction is neutralized.

/ʔɛstɬʼuh/	→	[ʔɛstɬʼʊh]	'I'm knitting'	(u → ʊ)
/sɛjæh/	→	[sɛjɛh]	'my throat'	(æ → ɛ)

==== Vowel flattening ====
Chilcotin has a type of retracted tongue root harmony. Generally, "flat" consonants lower vowels in both directions. Assimilation is both progressive and regressive.

Chilcotin consonants can be grouped into three categories: neutral, sharp, and flat.

Neutral
Sharp
Flat

p, pʰ, m
t, tʰ, tʼ, n
tɬ, tɬʰ, tɬʼ, ɬ, l
tʃ, tʃʰ, tʃʼ, ç, j
ʔ, h

ts, tsʰ, tsʼ, s, z
k, kʰ, kʼ
kʷ, kʷʰ, kʼʷ, xʷ, w

sˤ-series:
tsˤ, tsʰˤ, tsʼˤ, sˤ, zˤ
q-series:

q, qʰ, qʼ, χ, ʁ
qʷ, qʷʰ, qʼʷ, χʷ, ʁʷ

- Flat consonants trigger vowel flattening.
- Sharp consonants block vowel flattening.
- Neutral consonants do not affect vowel flattening in any way.

The flat consonants can be further divided into two types:

1. a sˤ-series (i.e. /tsˤ, tsʰˤ, tsʼˤ/ˌ etc.), and
2. a q-series (i.e. /q, qʷ, qʰ/ˌ etc.).

The sˤ-series is stronger than the q-series by affecting vowels farther away.

This table shows both unaffected vowels and flattened vowels:

unaffected vowel	flattened vowel
i	ᵊi or e
ɪ	ᵊɪ
u	o
ʊ	ɔ
ɛ	ə
æ	a

The vowel /i/ surfaces as [ᵊi] if after a flat consonant and as [e] before a flat consonant:

/sˤit/	→	[sˤᵊit]	'kinɡfisher'	(sˤ flattens i → ᵊi)
/nisˤtsˤun/	→	[nesˤtsˤon]	'owl'	(sˤ flattens i → e)

The progressive and regressive flattening processes are described below.

===== Progressive flattening =====
In the progressive (left-to-right) flattening, the q-series consonants affect only the immediately following vowel:

/ʁitʰi/	→	[ʁᵊitʰi]	'I slept'	(ʁ flattens i → ᵊi)
/qʰænɪç/	→	[qʰanɪç]	'spoon'	(qʰ flattens æ → a)

Like the q-series, the stronger sˤ-series consonants affects the immediately following vowel. However, it affects the vowel in the following syllable as well if the first flattened vowel is a lax vowel. If the first flattened is tense, the vowel of the following syllable is not flattened.

/sˤɛɬ.tʰin/	→	[sˤəɬ.tʰᵊin]	'he's comatose'	(sˤ flattens both ɛ → ə, i → ᵊi )
/sˤi.tʰin/	→	[sˤᵊi.tʰin]	'I'm sleeping'	(sˤ flattens first i → ᵊi, but not second i: *sˤᵊitʰᵊin)

Thus, the neutral consonants are transparent in the flattening process. In the first word /sˤɛɬ.tʰin/ 'he's comatose', /sˤ/ flattens the /ɛ/ of the first syllable to [ə] and the /i/ of the second syllable to [ᵊi]. In the word /sˤi.tʰin/ 'I'm sleeping', /sˤ/ flattens /i/ to [ᵊi]. Since, however, the vowel of the first syllable is /i/, which is a tense vowel, the /sˤ/ cannot flatten the /i/ of the second syllable.

The sharp consonants, however, block the progressive flattening caused by the sˤ-series:

/tizˤ.kʼɛn/	→	[tezˤ.kʼɛn]	'it's burning'	(flattening of ɛ is blocked by kʼ: *tezˤkʼən)
/sˤɛ.kɛn/	→	[sˤə.kɛn]	'it's dry'	(flattening of ɛ is blocked by k: *sˤəkən)

===== Regressive flattening =====
In regressive (right-to-left) harmony, the q-series flattens the preceding vowel.

/ʔælæχ/	→	[ʔælaχ]	'I made it'	(χ flattens æ → a)
/junɛqʰæt/	→	[junəqʰat]	'he's slappinɡ him'	(qʰ flattens ɛ → ə)

The regressive (right-to-left) harmony of the sˤ-series, however, is much stronger than the progressive harmony. The consonants flatten all preceding vowels in a word:

/kunizˤ/	→	[konezˤ]	'it is lonɡ'	(zˤ flattens all vowels, both i → e, u → o)
/kʷɛtɛkuljúzˤ/	→	[kʷətəkoljózˤ]	'he is rich'	(zˤ flattens all vowels, ɛ → ə, u → o)
/nækʷɛnitsˤɛ́sˤ/	→	[nakʷənetsˤə́sˤ]	'fire's gone out'	(tsˤ, sˤ flatten all vowels, æ → a, ɛ → ə)

Both progressive and regressive flattening processes occur in Chilcotin words:

/niqʰin/	→	[neqʰᵊin]	'we paddled'
/ʔɛqʰɛn/	→	[ʔəqʰən]	'husband'

== Bibliography ==
- Andrews, Christina (1988). Lexical Phonology of Chilcotin (MA thesis). University of British Columbia.
- Bird, Sonya; Onosson, Sky (2023). "A phonetic case study of Tŝilhqot'in /z/ and /zˤ/". Journal of the International Phonetic Association. 53 (3): 835–868. doi:10.1017/S0025100322000093.
- Campbell, Lyle (1997). American Indian Languages: The Historical Linguistics of Native America. Oxford University Press. ISBN 0-19-509427-1.
- Clements, G. N. (1991). A Note on Chilcotin Flattening. (unpublished manuscript).
- Cook, Eung-Do (1976). A Phonological Study of Chilcotin and Carrier. A Report to the National Museums of Canada. (unpublished manuscript).
- Cook, Eung-Do (1983). "Chilcotin Flattening". Canadian Journal of Linguistics. 28 (2): 123–132. doi:10.1017/S0008413100024075. S2CID 247196222.
- Cook, Eung-Do (1986). "Ambisyllabicity and Nasalization in Chilcotin". Working Papers for the 21st International Conference on Salish and Neighboring Languages. Seattle: University of Washington. pp. 1–6.
- Cook, Eung-Do (1989). "Articulatory and Acoustic Correlates of Pharyngealization: Evidence from Athapaskan". In Gerdts, D.; Michelson, K. (eds.). Theoretical Perspectives on Native American Languages. Albany: State University of New York Press. pp. 133–145.
- Cook, Eung-Do (1989). "Chilcotin Tone and Verb Paradigms". In Cook, E.-D.; Rice, K. (eds.). Athapaskan Linguistics. Berlin: Mouton De Gruyter. pp. 145–198.
- Cook, Eung-Do (November 1993). "Chilcotin Flattening and Autosegmental Phonology". Lingua. 91 (2–3): 149–174. doi:10.1016/0024-3841(93)90011-K.
- Cook, Eung-Do (2013). A Tsilhqút’in Grammar. First Nations Languages. University of British Columbia Press. ISBN 9780774865708.
- Cook, Eung-Do; Rice, Keren, eds. (1989). Athapaskan Linguistics: Current Perspectives on a Language Family. Trends in Linguistics. Vol. 15. Berlin: Mouton De Gruyter. ISBN 0-89925-282-6.
- Gafos, Adamantios (1999). The Articulatory Basis of Locality in Phonology. New York: Garland Publishing. ISBN 0-8153-3286-6. (revised version of the author's Doctoral dissertation, Johns Hopkins University).
- Hansson, Gunnar O. (2000-06-10). Chilcotin Vowel Flattening and Sibilant Harmony: Diachronic Cues to a Synchronic Puzzle. Athabaskan Language Conference. Moricetown, BC.
- Krauss, Michael E. (1975). Chilcotin Phonology, a Descriptive and Historical Report, with Recommendations for a Chilcotin Orthography. Alaskan Native Language Center. (unpublished manuscript).
- Krauss, Michael E.; Golla, Victor (1981). "Northern Athapaskan Languages". In Helm, June (ed.). Handbook of North American Indians. Vol. 6: Subarctic. Washington, DC: Smithsonian Institution. pp. 67–85.
- Laita Pallarés, Paula (2021). Indigenous Language Revitalization in British Columbia: Yuneŝit'in strategies for Nenqayni ch'ih or the Tŝilhqot'in language (PDF) (PhD thesis). University of the Basque Country UPV/EHU.
- Latimer, R. M. (1978). A Study of Chilcotin Phonology (MA thesis). University of Calgary.
- Mithun, Marianne (4 November 1999). The Languages of Native North America. Cambridge University Press. ISBN 0-521-23228-7.
