= Chilcotin Country =

Geographic region in British Columbia, Canada

Tŝilhqóx / Nen "Ochre River"/"Land"
- People: Nenqayni (Tŝilhqotʼin)
- Language: Nenqayni Ch'ih (Tŝilhqotʼin Chʼih)
- Country: Tŝilhqotʼin Nen

The Chilcotin (/tʃɪlˈkoʊtɪn/) region of British Columbia is usually known simply as "the Chilcotin", and also in speech commonly as "the Chilcotin Country" or simply Chilcotin. It is a plateau and mountain region in British Columbia on the inland lee of the Coast Mountains on the west side of the Fraser River. Chilcotin is also the name of the river draining that region. In the language of the Tsilhqot'in people, their name and the name of the river means "those of the red ochre river" (its tributary the Chilko River means "red ochre river"). The proper name of the Chilcotin Country, or Tsilhqotʼin territory, in their language is Tŝilhqotʼin Nen.

The Chilcotin district is often viewed as an extension of the Cariboo region, east of that river, although it has a distinct identity from the Cariboo District. It is, nonetheless, part of the Cariboo Regional District which is a municipal-level body governing some aspects of infrastructure and land-used planning. The vast majority of the population are First Nations people, members of the Tsilhqot'in and Dakelh peoples, while others are settlers and ranchers.

== Geography ==
The Chilcotin district is mostly a wide, high plateau, stretching from the mountains to the Fraser River, but also includes several fjord-like lakes which verge from the plateau into the base of the mountains. The largest of the lakes in the region is Chilko Lake, which feeds the Chilko River, the main tributary of the Chilcotin River. Other major lakes are Tatlayoko Lake (/ˈtætləkoʊ/ TAT-lə-koh) and Taseko Lake (/təˈsiːkoʊ/ tə-SEE-koh); the area of the lakes, in the southern part of the district, is now the Tsʼilʔos Provincial Park, also known as the Xeni Gwetʼin Wilderness after the Xeni Gwetʼin, the local subdivision of the Tsilhqotʼin people) and are also known as the Stony Chilcotin, who were also instrumental in the campaign for that area's preservation.

The forested plateau area just northeast of the park, between the Chilko River and the Taseko Rivers, is known as the Brittany Triangle and is currently the subject of intense dispute between preservationists and logging interests. East of the Tsʼilʔos Provincial Park is Big Creek Provincial Park and the Churn Creek Protected Area, while to the southeast is the Spruce Lake Protected Area a.k.a. "the South Chilcotin", which, despite its nickname, is mostly in the Bridge River Country, part of the Lillooet Country and not part of the Chilcotin Country, which begins at the protected area's northern and northwestern borders.

== Literary contributions ==
Despite its small population and isolation, the region has produced a small but very readable literature mixing naturalism with native and settler cultures and memoirs. The best-known Chilcotin authors are Leland Stowe and Paul St. Pierre; the latter was formerly a Member of Parliament for Coast Chilcotin and a noted Vancouver journalist. St. Pierre's writing encapsulated Chilcotin folklore and daily life and is written in a crisp, ironic, and often humorous style; the best-known are Smith and Other Events and Cariboo Cowboy, while Stowe's writings focus on the wildlife of the area on the western rim of the district, adjacent to Tweedsmuir South Provincial Park. His Crusoe of Lonesome Lake is about early settler Ralph Edwards and his work protecting the trumpeter swans which migrate through the region; Edwards' own volume Ralph Edwards of Lonesome Lake parallels Stowe's account, and the book Ruffles On My Longjohns by his sister-in-law Isabel Edwards documents her tribulations as the wilderness wife of a wildlife advocate.

Another notable book from more recent times are Chiwid by Sage Birchwater of Tatlayoko Lake, documenting eyewitness reminiscences of a First Nations eccentric-cum-spirit person, Lilly Skinner, and Nemaia: the Unconquered Country by Terry Glavin, which recounts the story of the Chilcotin War of 1864 and the flavour of the Nemaia Valley today (the Nemaia is the main residence of the Xeni Gwetin, who were the main instigators of the war).

Edwards's cabin and the trumpeter habitat are World Heritage sites, although his cabin was burned out in large forest fires in the summer of 2004.

Another Chilcotin author is Ted "Chilco" Choate, a hunting guide at Gaspard Lake in the southeastern part of the district who writes about animals, hunters and the wilderness lifestyle. Choate is one of the main advocates for combining the Tweedsmuir, Tsʼilʔos, Spruce Lake/South Chilcotin, Big Creek and Churn Creek wilderness areas into one large national park spanning the Coast Mountains and plateau between the Fraser and the spine of the Coast Mountains.

== Wild horses ==
The Chilcotin is also known for its large population of mustang horses, which have contributed to the bloodlines of domesticated horses in the region, including a variety known as the cayuse pony or, in some local spellings, cayoosh (the old name for the town of Lillooet), which lies just outside the Chilcotin to the southeast, near where the plateau meets the Fraser River.

Still "controlled" today due to their competition for forage with cattle herds, they were once so overpopulated — even before put into competition with the feed demands of large-scale ranching — that a high bounty was set on them and they were hunted out and nearly exterminated. They are believed to be stock brought in during gold rush times, as according to contemporary records the Chilcotins did not have horses until then. Author and guide-outfitter Chilco Choate, however, points out that, based on forage patterns and the adaptation of the breed to the area, it is more likely that they entered the area already wild before domestication by local natives and being perhaps offshoots of the large horse herds acquired by the Okanagan and Nez Perce and other plateau peoples several decades before. Despite their controlled status, their population survives today, though imperilled by expansion of ranching and logging.

The area is accessed by Highway 20, which runs from the port town of Bella Coola, at the head of South Bentinck Arm, a coastal fjord piercing into the heart of the Coast Mountains, across the mountains and plateau to the city of Williams Lake, the principal town of the south Cariboo. Near Highway 20 at the southern end of Tweedsmuir Park is Hunlen Falls, at 1226 feet (373.7 m), one of Canada's highest, plunging into a deep canyon that makes measurement difficult.

== Settlements and towns ==
The largest towns in the Chilcotin are Alexis Creek, Anahim Lake and Hanceville, which are all First Nations communities. Other communities in the Chilcotin are Towdystan, Nimpo Lake, Nemaiah Valley, Tatla Lake, and Tatlayoko Lake, though settlers (usually small ranchers and owners and staff of small resorts) are scattered across the backcountry. There is a Canadian Forces artillery and tactics range on the eastern edge of the plateau, in the vicinity of old Fort Chilcotin (this land was originally set aside for military purposes following the Chilcotin War).

== The Gang Ranch ==
Also of major importance in the Chilcotin is the Gang Ranch, once the world's largest and still among the major beef suppliers in British Columbia. "The Gang" dates from the 1860s and covers nearly all terrain south of the Chilcotin River and east of Taseko Lake and the Fraser River, and skirting the Bridge River Country to its south. The vast terrain of the Gang Ranch is more wilderness than pasture, with natural plateau and alpine meadowland and vast forests and swamps. The Gang verges up into the foothill area of the northeastern flank of the Coast Mountains as they approach the Fraser River from the west, meeting the Fraser between the Gang Ranch's main house and the town of Lillooet.

Similar ranching conditions are found from the Burns Lake and Smithers area in northwestern Interior BC all the way south to the US border, including the famous Douglas Lake Ranch south of Kamloops, but the Gang is by far the largest, and the most wild in character.
