= Whitesaddle Mountain =

Mountain in British Columbia, Canada

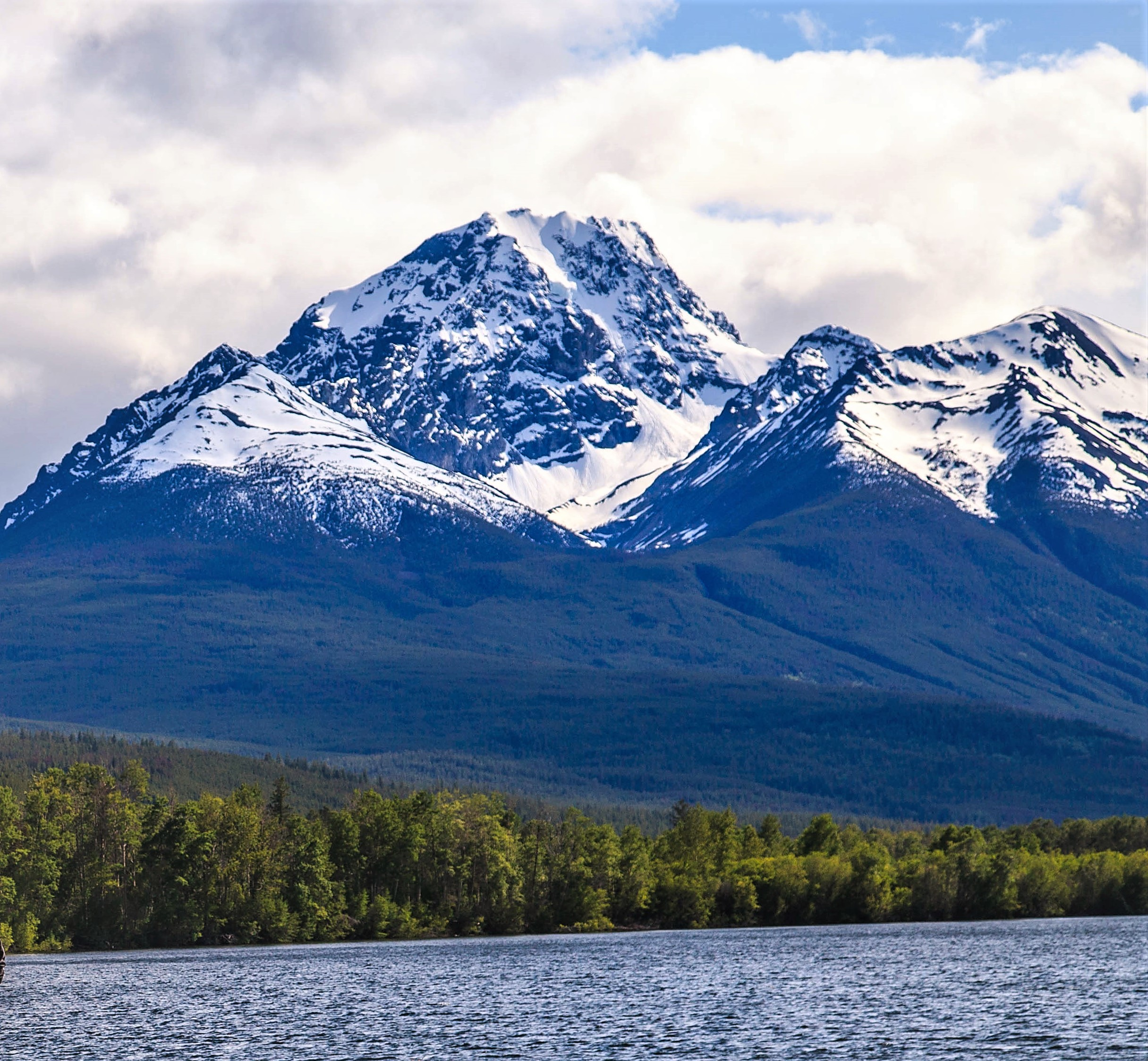
- Northeast aspect, from Bluff Lake

Highest point
- Elevation: 2,990 m (9,810 ft)
- Prominence: 615 m (2,018 ft)
- Parent peak: Blackhorn Mountain (3,022 m)
- Isolation: 4.9 km (3.0 mi)
- Listing: Mountains of British Columbia
- Coordinates: 51°38′21″N 124°50′54″W

Geography
- Location within British Columbia Location within Canada
- Interactive map of Whitesaddle Mountain
- Country: Canada
- Province: British Columbia
- District: Range 2 Coast Land District
- Parent range: Coast Mountains; Niut Range
- Topo map: NTS 92N10 Razorback Mountain

Whitesaddle Mountain is a summit located in British Columbia, Canada.

== Description ==
Whitesaddle Mountain, elevation 2,990 metres (9,810 ft), is situated 300 km (190 mi) north-northwest of Vancouver in the Niut Range of the Coast Mountains. Whitesaddle ranks as the ninth-highest peak in the Niut Range. Precipitation runoff and glacier meltwater from the mountain drains into tributaries of Mosley Creek, thence Homathko River and ultimately Bute Inlet. Topographic relief is significant as the summit rises nearly 2,200 m (7,220 ft) above Middle Lake in six kilometres (3.7 miles).

== History ==
The Whitesaddle name was submitted for consideration in April 1933 by Henry Snow Hall (1895–1987), Harvard Mountaineering Club, following his first ascent of nearby Blackhorn Mountain in 1932. Hall wrote: "I have suggested the names Whitesaddle and Blackhorn for the two peaks which are prominently visible down the Homathko valley from the automobile road passing Tatla Lake. The names seem appropriate for this cattle ranching country because of the appearance of the peaks themselves. The right hand peak of the two, a dark rock dome, has a white glacier flowing from the summit down the face of the peak toward the observer which reminded me at once of a white saddle." The landform's toponym was officially adopted January 9, 1934, by the Geographical Names Board of Canada.

The first ascent of Whitesaddle's summit was made in 1939 by Henry Snow Hall and Hans Fuhrer. In July 1985, Fred Beckey and Reed Tindall were the first to climb the north face.

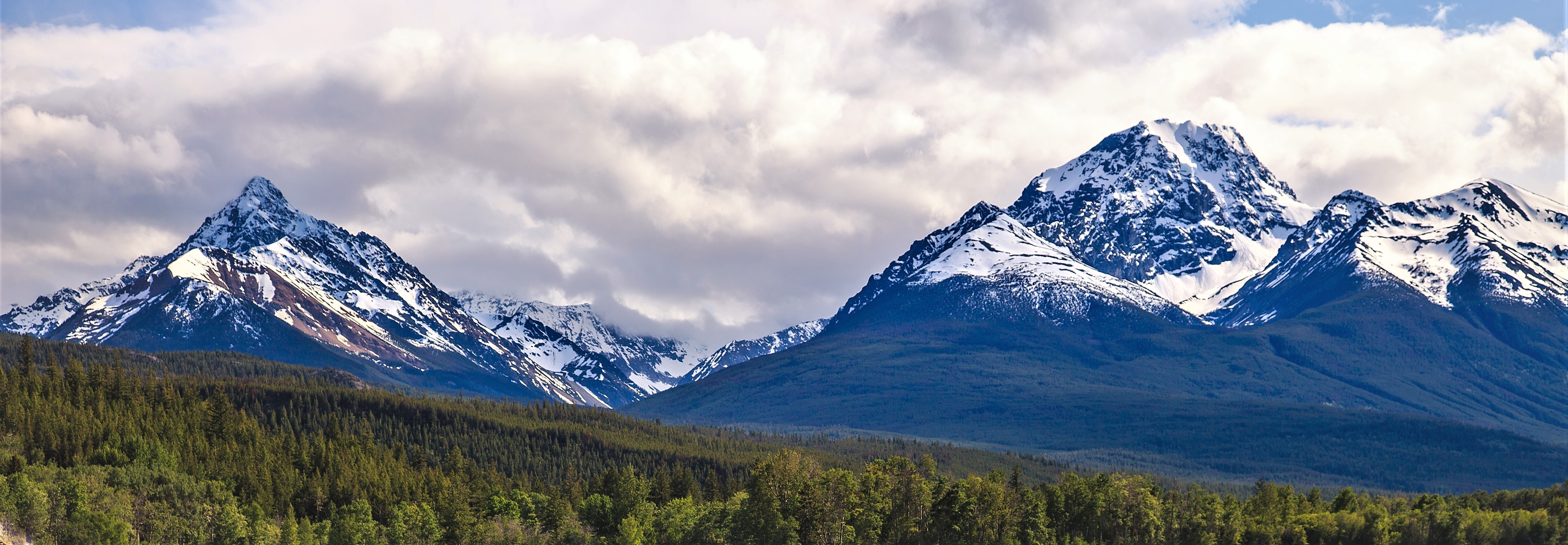
Blackhorn (left), Whitesaddle (right)

== Climate ==
Based on the Köppen climate classification, Whitesaddle Mountain is located in the marine west coast climate zone of western North America. Most weather fronts originate in the Pacific Ocean, and travel east toward the Coast Mountains where they are forced upward by the range (Orographic lift), causing them to drop their moisture in the form of rain or snowfall. As a result, the Coast Mountains experience high precipitation, especially during the winter months in the form of snowfall. Winter temperatures can drop below −20 °C with wind chill factors below −30 °C.

== See also ==
- Geography of British Columbia
