= Blackhorn Mountain =

Mountain in British Columbia, Canada

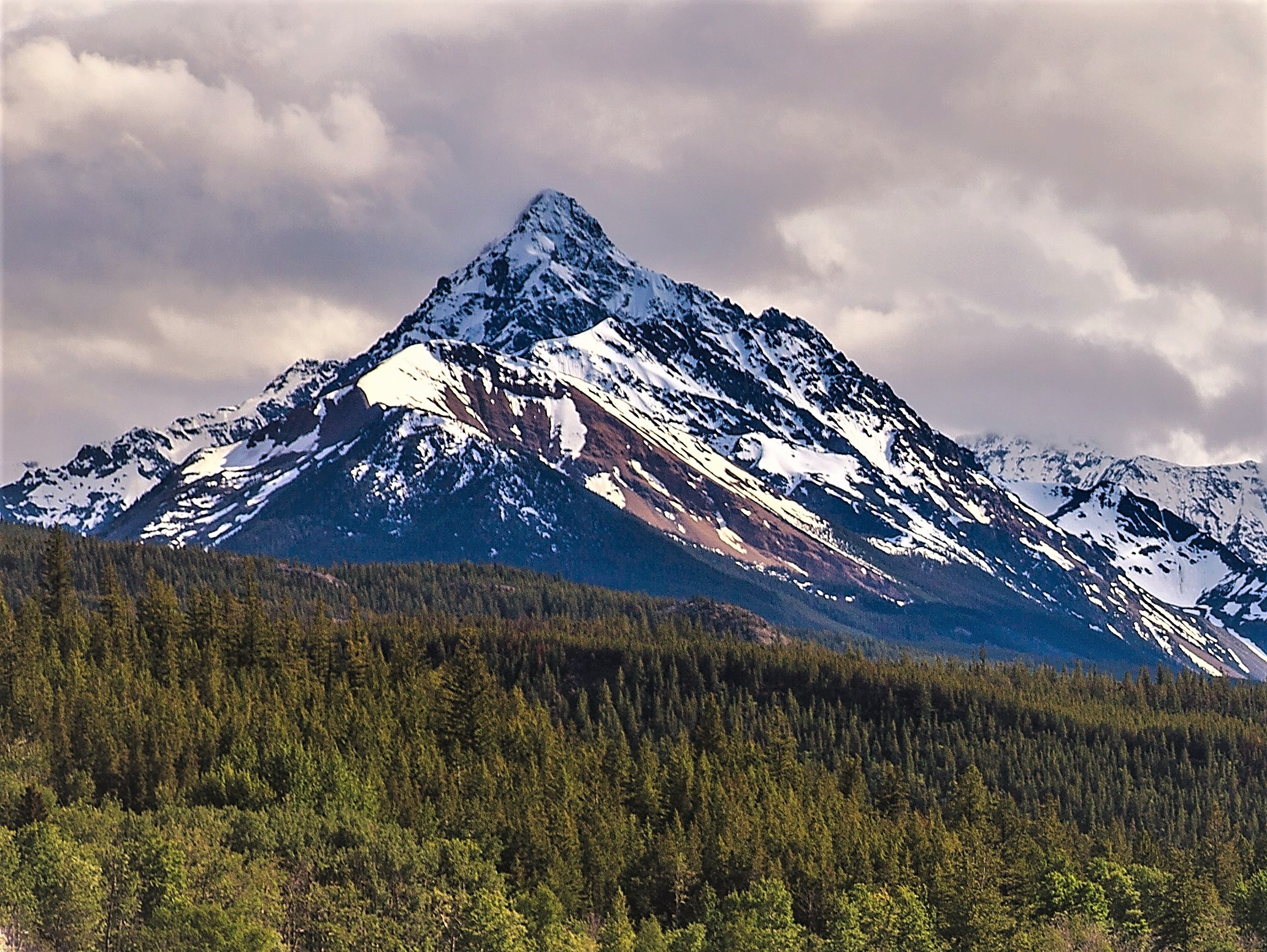
- Northeast aspect, from Bluff Lake

Highest point
- Elevation: 3,022 m (9,915 ft)
- Prominence: 627 m (2,057 ft)
- Parent peak: Razorback Mountain (3,183 m)
- Isolation: 6.3 km (3.9 mi)
- Listing: Mountains of British Columbia
- Coordinates: 51°36′26″N 124°47′56″W

Geography
- Location within British Columbia Location within Canada
- Interactive map of Blackhorn Mountain
- Country: Canada
- Province: British Columbia
- District: Range 2 Coast Land District
- Parent range: Coast Mountains; Niut Range
- Topo map: NTS 92N10 Razorback Mountain

Geology
- Rock age: Carnian

Climbing
- First ascent: August 1932 Henry Snow Hall and Hans Fuhrer

Blackhorn Mountain is a summit located in British Columbia, Canada.

== Description ==
Blackhorn Mountain, elevation 3,022-meters (9,915-feet), is situated 300 km (190 mi) north-northwest of Vancouver in the Niut Range of the Coast Mountains. Blackhorn ranks as the seventh-highest peak in the Niut Range. It is set between Whitesaddle Mountain and Razorback Mountain. Precipitation runoff and glacier meltwater from the mountain drains into tributaries of Mosley Creek, thence Homathko River and ultimately Bute Inlet. Topographic relief is significant as the summit rises 1,500 meters (4,920 feet) above Razor Creek in two kilometers (1.2 mile).

== History ==
The first recorded ascent of Blackhorn's summit was made in August 1932 by Henry Snow Hall and Hans Fuhrer.

The Blackhorn name was submitted for consideration in April 1933 by Henry Snow Hall (1895–1987), Harvard Mountaineering Club, following his 1932 ascent. Hall wrote: "I have suggested the names Whitesaddle and Blackhorn for the two peaks which are prominently visible down the Homathko valley from the automobile road passing Tatla Lake. The names seem appropriate for this cattle ranching country because of the appearance of the peaks themselves. The right hand peak of the two, a dark rock dome, has a white glacier flowing from the summit down the face of the peak toward the observer which reminded me at once of a white saddle. The left hand peak, a sharper black rock summit might easily be imagined to look like a saddle horn or black horn." The landform's toponym was officially adopted January 9, 1934, by the Geographical Names Board of Canada.

The first ascent of Blackhorn via the Northwest Couloir was made September 27, 2003, by Colin Haley (solo).

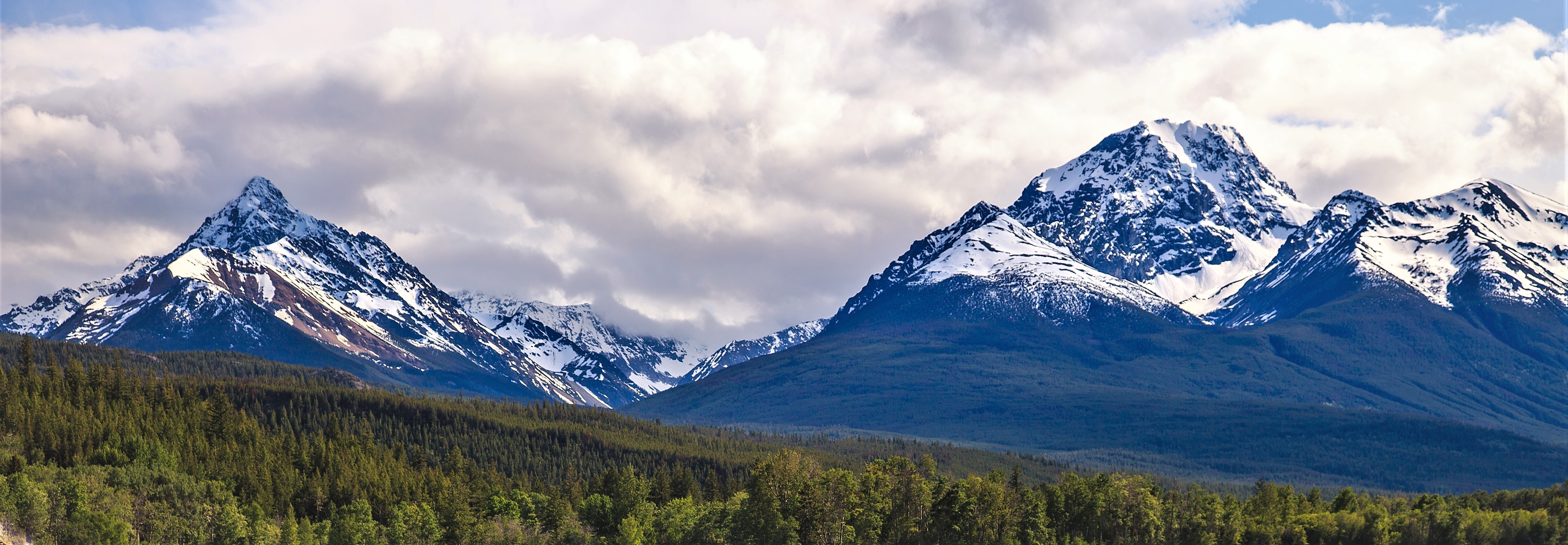
Blackhorn (left), Whitesaddle (right)

== Climate ==
Based on the Köppen climate classification, Blackhorn Mountain is located in the marine west coast climate zone of western North America. Most weather fronts originate in the Pacific Ocean, and travel east toward the Coast Mountains where they are forced upward by the range (Orographic lift), causing them to drop their moisture in the form of rain or snowfall. As a result, the Coast Mountains experience high precipitation, especially during the winter months in the form of snowfall. Winter temperatures can drop below −20 °C with wind chill factors below −30 °C.

== See also ==
- Geography of British Columbia
