= Waddington Harbour =

Harbour in the country of Canada

Waddington Harbour is a harbour at the head of Bute Inlet in the Central Coast region of British Columbia, Canada. Also issuing into the head of Bute Inlet and Waddington Harbour, just east of the mouth of the Homathko, is the Teaquahan River. Issuing directly into the inlet a few miles south on the harbour's southeast is the Southgate River, one of the major rivers of the central Pacific Ranges, which begins on the west side of the Lillooet Icecap. Its lower valley adjacent to the inlet's shores is called Pigeon Valley.

== Geography ==
Located immediately at the outlet of the Homathko River is Homathko Estuary Provincial Park, and Potato Point at 50°55′38″N 124°51′26″W on the right (west) bank of the Homathko's mouth, which is the location of Potato Point Indian Reserve No. 3 and Hamilton Point slightly south along the Bute Inlet shoreline at 50°54′07″N 124°51′14″W. Cumsack Creek flows from the east into the estuary just above the Homathko's mouth at 50°56′12″N 124°51′46″W.

=== Mountains overlooking the harbour ===
Standing on the north side of Pigeon Valley and the lower Southgate, is Southgate Peak at 50°55′04″N 124°45′07″W, and immediately east of it Mount Bute at 50°56′06″N 124°42′04″W.

On the ridge just north of it is Galleon Peak at 50°57′31″N 124°42′23″W. Immediately north of the head of the inlet and the mouths of the Homathko and Teaquahan is Teaquahan Mountain at 51°01′55″N 124°49′28″W, a southwestern forepeak of which is Mount Evans at 50°59′43″N 124°51′04″W.

Located on the west side of Waddington Harbour above Potato Point is House Mountain at 50°53′45″N 124°56′47″W.

South of Waddington Harbour is Mount Sir Francis Drake at 50°47′29″N 124°47′09″W.

== History and name origin ==
The harbour and the route it accessed into the British Columbia Interior via the canyon of the Homathko were central to the events leading to the Chilcotin War of 1862 and in the proceedings of that conflict as it unfolded. It was originally foreseen as a potential steamship port for a proposed route to the Cariboo goldfields. It wound up being a staging point for troops and officials from Victoria sent up in the course of the war. In later years, the Canadian Pacific Railway Survey eyed it as a viable route for a transcontinental rail line that would end at Victoria (rather than Vancouver, which was their final choice).

The harbour was named for Alfred Waddington, who was one of the most prominent businessmen in colonial-era Victoria. He had left England for California in 1849, and arrived in Victoria with thousands of others who left the San Francisco and the California goldfields upon news of the Fraser Gold Rush that gave birth to the Colony of British Columbia that year.

When the Cariboo Gold Rush was in full swing, there was demand for an easier route for shipping and passenger travel to the remote goldfields towns around Barkerville, by then the largest town in the Interior. Waddington applied for a license to construct a wagon road from the head of Bute Inlet to Fort Alexandria on the Fraser and the existing roads from there to the goldfields and southwards. He first conceived of the idea in 1862 and struggled financially with the project until 1864, when work crews began work on the road and came into conflict with Tsilhqot'in warriors whom they had hired to help. The Tsilhqot'in were hungry and the survivors of the devastating 1862 Pacific Northwest smallpox epidemic, which had destroyed the indigenous population of British Columbia in vast numbers. The Tshilqot'in had been among the hardest hit, with an estimated 90% wiped out in a few short weeks. When the warriors realized what they were building, they protested to the work camp boss, who threatened them with smallpox.

That night, April 30, 1864, the Tsilhqot'in killed fourteen out of the seventeen men in the work crew, and destroyed their tools and provisions. When the survivors reached Victoria and the Cariboo, thus began a months-long manhunt including troops brought by warship to Waddington Harbour, or Port Waddington as a townsite laid out during the war was known, who met with irregular enlistments inland on the Chilcotin Plateau. Among those disembarking and embarking at the harbour was Governor Seymour, who travelled to the theatre of war with his entourage, though to no great effect. The war ended with the surrender of Klatassine, who turned himself in on conditions of amnesty, but was taken captive and with four others was hanged at Quesnel on June 13, 1864.

Waddington was a member of the Legislative Assembly of Vancouver Island, and also superintendent of schools from 1865 to 1866. He travelled to London in 1868 to lobby for more support for proposal of a railway and for the development of British Columbia, returning to BC in 1869, and sold his plans and surveys and license rights on the route to the new Province of British Columbia in 1871. Waddington's dream of a route was never given up, and he died of smallpox in Victoria on February 27, 1872, at 76 years age, still lobbying in his last years for the Bute Inlet route to Vancouver Island for the railway promised to British Columbia upon its entry to Confederation in 1871.

Waddington Bay in the Broughton Archipelago was also named for him, as is Mount Waddington, the highest mountain entirely within British Columbia, and the Waddington Range surrounding it and a glacier from its summit, and another mountain in the Yellowhead Pass, which was his choice for the route of the railway through the Rockies, Waddington Peak. One of the canyons of the Homathko is also named for him, and Waddington Channel between East and West Redonda Islands.

== See also ==
- Waddington (disambiguation)
