= Mount Bute =

Mountain in British Columbia, Canada

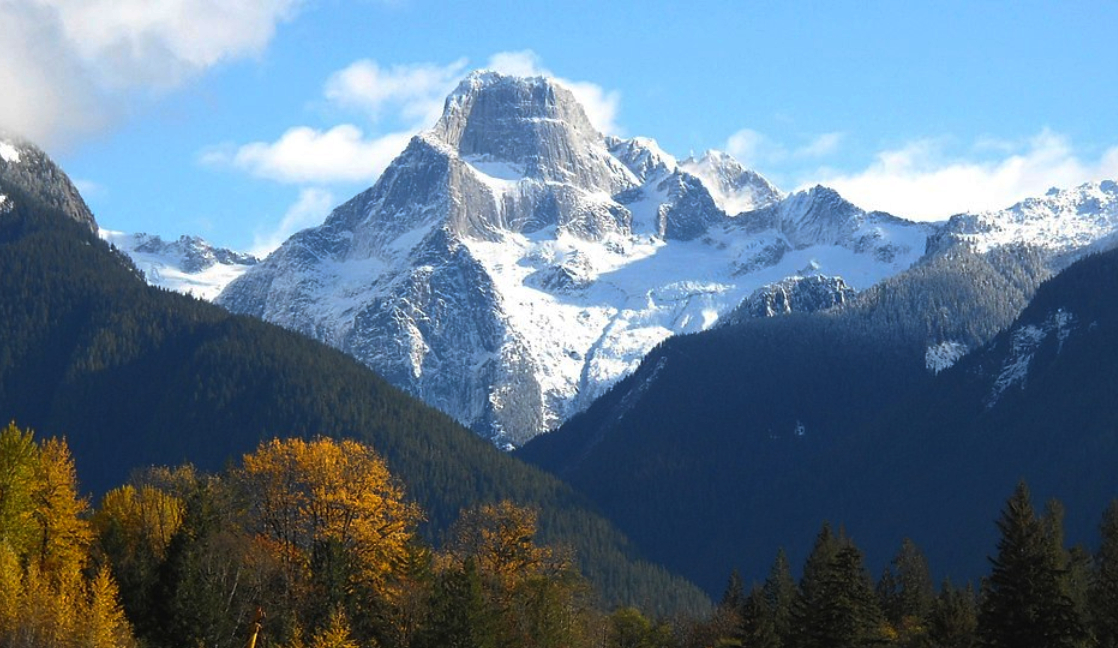
- Mount Bute with the west face featured

Highest point
- Elevation: 2,810 m (9,220 ft)
- Prominence: 640 m (2,100 ft)
- Parent peak: Mount Grenville (3126 m)
- Isolation: 12.1 km (7.5 mi)
- Listing: Mountains of British Columbia
- Coordinates: 50°56′06″N 124°42′04″W

Naming
- Etymology: John Stuart, 3rd Earl of Bute

Geography
- Location within British Columbia Location within Canada
- Interactive map of Mount Bute
- Location: British Columbia, Canada
- District: Range 1 Coast Land District
- Parent range: Coast Mountains
- Topo map: NTS 92K15 Southgate River

Geology
- Rock type: granite

Mount Bute, also known as Bute Mountain, is a 2,810-metre (9,220-foot) mountain located in the Coast Mountains of British Columbia, Canada. Situated at the southern extreme of the Homathko Icefield, Mount Bute has an impressive 800-metre sheer granite west face, and Bute Glacier dominates the north aspect. This imposing mountain is visible from Waddington Harbour at the head of Bute Inlet, in a remote wilderness area that few visit. Its nearest higher peak is Mount Grenville, 13.0 km (8.1 mi) to the east-northeast. Mount Grenville is the highest summit of the icefield. Mount Bute is 63.0 km (39.1 mi) southeast of Mount Waddington, the highest peak of the entire Coast Mountains range.

== History ==
Like Bute Inlet, the mountain was named in 1792 by Captain George Vancouver to honor John Stuart, 3rd Earl of Bute who was Prime Minister of Great Britain from 1762 to 1763. Stuart's grandson Charles Stuart was a master's mate on George Vancouver's Discovery. The mountain's toponym was officially adopted in 1963 by the Geographical Names Board of Canada.

== Climate ==
Based on the Köppen climate classification, Mount Bute is located in a marine west coast climate zone of western North America. Most weather fronts originate in the Pacific Ocean, and travel east toward the Coast Mountains where they are forced upward by the range (Orographic lift), causing them to drop their moisture in the form of rain or snowfall. As a result, the Coast Mountains experience high precipitation, especially during the winter months in the form of snowfall. Temperatures can drop below −20 °C with wind chill factors below −30 °C. Precipitation runoff from Mount Bute drains into the Southgate River which empties into Bute Inlet, except where the Bute Glacier meltwater drains into Galleon Creek.

== Climbing ==
The imposing west face was first climbed in 1986 by Greg Foweraker and Don Serl. The second ascent was accomplished three days later by Fred Beckey, Kit Lewis, and Jim Nelson.

The School of Rock route (YDS 5.11 50 pitches) was first climbed in 2009 by Jimmy Martinello, Bruce Kay, and Jason Sinnes.
