= Waddington Canyon =

Steep-sided canyon carved by the Homathko River in British Columbia, Canada

Coordinates: 51°14′15″N 124°56′10″W

Waddington Canyon is a canyon on the Homathko River in the heart of the Pacific Ranges of the Coast Mountains in British Columbia, Canada, located below the confluence of Mosley Creek.

The canyon was named for Alfred Waddington, a gold rush-era entrepreneur who sought to build a road by this route to the Cariboo goldfields from the head of Bute Inlet, which is the outflow of the Homathko River. Opposition to the project and the abusiveness of the project's foreman led to the Chilcotin War of 1864. The location of the killings that touched off the war is in the depths of the canyon at a location marked on maps as Murderers' Bar.

Waddington Canyon has been proposed as the site of one of the dams of a hydroelectric development involving a number of lakes and rivers in the region, including Tatlayoko, Chilko and Taseko Lakes, as well as Mosley Creek and the Homathko and Southgate Rivers

== See also ==
- Klattasine
- Great Canyon
