= Mount Gilbert (British Columbia) =

Mountain in British Columbia, Canada

Coordinates: 50°51′43″N 124°16′21″W

Mount Gilbert, 3124 m (10249 ft) prominence: 484 m, is a mountain in the Pacific Ranges of the Coast Mountains of British Columbia, Canada. It is located south of the confluence of the Bishop and Southgate Rivers and to the west of the Compton Névé, a large icefield, and to the south of the Homathko Icefield, another large icefield.

The mountain was named in honour of Sir Humphrey Gilbert, a British navigator who was the half-brother of Sir Walter Raleigh. Mount Raleigh is nearby and in prominence-terms is Mount Gilbert's "line parent", with a prominence of 484 m.
