= Niut Range =

Mountain range in British Columbia, Canada

Coordinates: 51°34′00″N 124°38′00″W

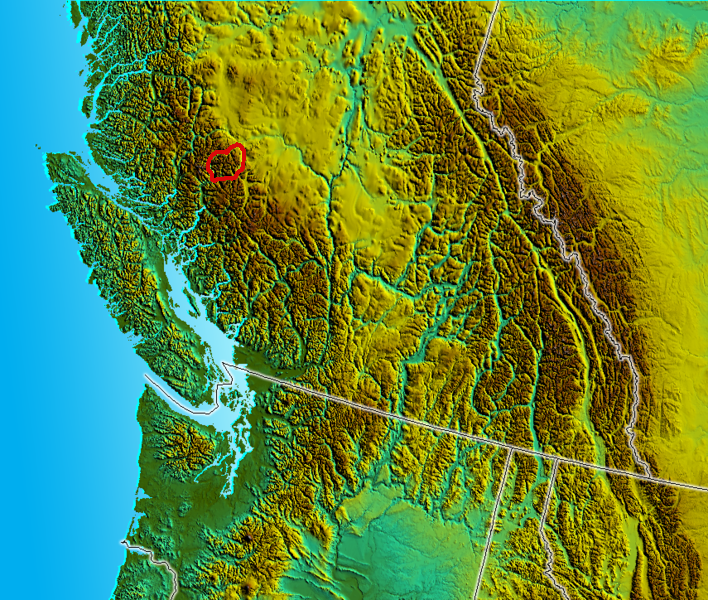
Location map of Niut Range

The Niut Range is 3600 km^{2} (c. 1390 sq mi) in area. It is a subrange of the Pacific Ranges of the Coast Mountains of British Columbia, Canada although in some classifications it is considered part of the Chilcotin Ranges (which in some classifications are themselves part of the Pacific Ranges). The Niut is located in the angle of the Homathko River and its main west fork, Mosley Creek. It is isolated, island-like, by those rivers from its neighbour ranges, as both streams have their source on the Chilcotin Plateau in behind the range. Razorback Mountain is its highest peak.

Northwest across Mosley Creek is the Pantheon Range and due west is the Waddington Range and south of that is the Whitemantle Range; further northwest is the Klinaklini Icefield, beyond the river of the same name. To the southeast across the great Grand Canyon of the Homathko is the Homathko Icefield, east of which beyond the area of Mount Queen Bess is Tsy'los Provincial Park.

== History ==
Just below the confluence of Mosley Creek and the Homathko River, at the southern foot of the Niut Range, the bullying of a party of Tsilhqot'in First Nations warriors hired to help build an enterprise known as Waddington's Road led to their massacre of the road company's workers and the opening of hostilities between a faction of the Chilcotin people and the colonial government of British Columbia.

This was the opening round of the Chilcotin War of 1864. The land-surveyed townsite of Port Waddington on today's maps is a relic of those times. The townsite had been surveyed as part of the roadbuilders Alfred Waddington's obligations in having the licence to build the road, as well as profit from the sale of lots (and some lots were sold, but the townsite never came to anything).

The route of the failed road contract was later considered for the mainline of the Canadian Pacific Railway, to connect to Vancouver Island via Seymour Narrows to connect to Victoria, but Burrard Inlet was chosen for the railway's terminus-port city instead, thereby creating the city of Vancouver.

Attention to the route's possibilities waned since being eyed by the CPR but plans to develop the Homathko and its neighbouring rivers for hydroelectric power have been considered throughout the 20th Century by BC Hydro, the province's Crown-owned power monopoly. The Homathko by itself has immense hydroelectric potential, but full build-out as first conceived would divert the Taseko Lakes and Chilko Lake into the Homathko system via Tatlayoko Lake. Other than those diversions, which would deplete the Chilcotin River and its contribution to the Fraser, a series of dams on the Homathko and its tributaries would have generated some of the most power-per-project in British Columbia using the extra power of the water from the Chilcotin's tributaries.

The creation of Tsʼilʔos Provincial Park (the 'ʔ' represents a glottal stop) and Big Creek Provincial Park have shelved the grand plan, as Chilko and Taseko Lakes are protected and cannot be diverted (also for salmon fishery reasons). But the hydroelectric potential of the Homathko Canyon are still on the books and are to be developed as run-of-the-river project by Plutonic Power, a subsidiary of General Electric.

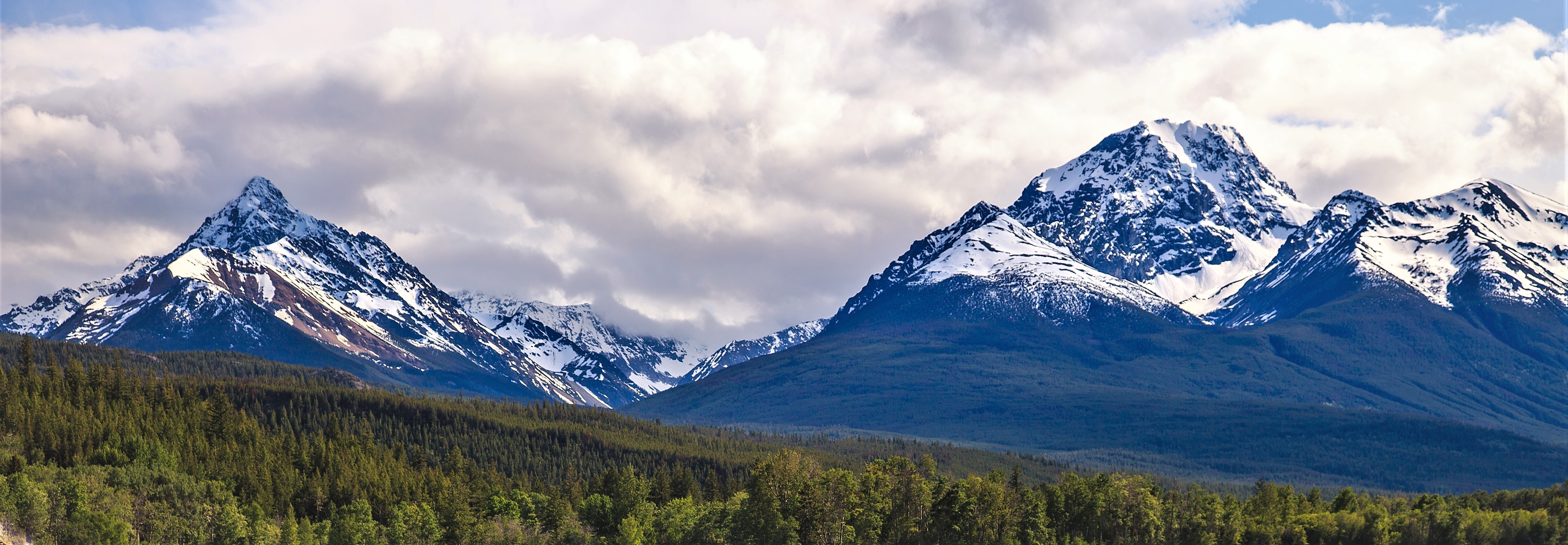
Blackhorn Mountain (left) and Whitesaddle Mountain (right) of the Niut Range
