= Mount Good Hope =

Mountain in the country of Canada

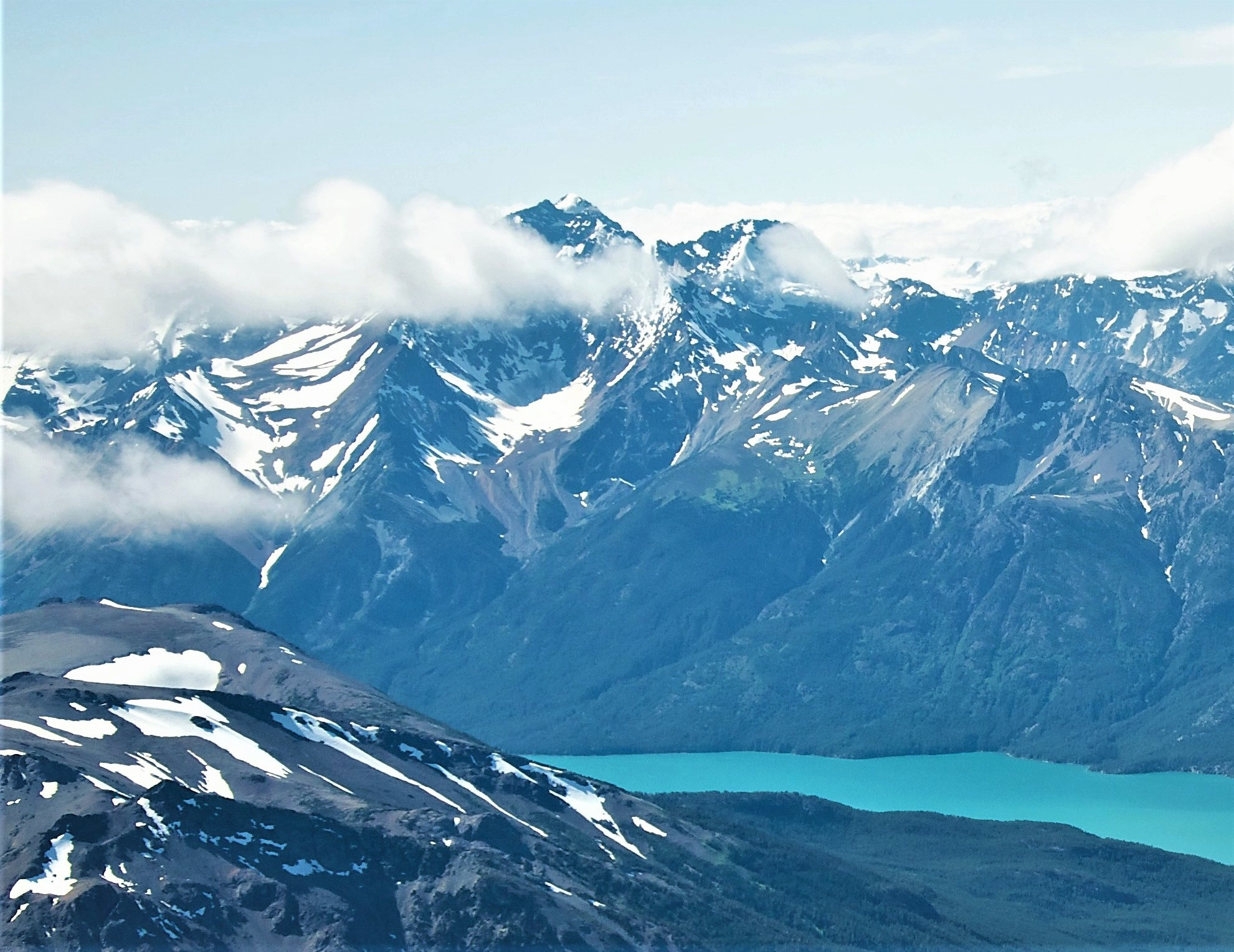
- Top of Good Hope centered above cloud Aerial view from northeast

Highest point
- Elevation: 3,242 m (10,636 ft)
- Prominence: 1,497 m (4,911 ft)
- Listing: Mountains of British Columbia; Canada highest major peaks 57th
- Coordinates: 51°08′33″N 124°10′18″W

Geography
- Location within British Columbia
- Location: British Columbia, Canada
- District: Range 2 Coast Land District
- Parent range: Pacific Ranges
- Topo map: NTS 92N1 Chilko Mountain

Climbing
- First ascent: 1922 by R. Bishop and G. Durham
- Easiest route: rock/ice climb

Officially Good Hope Mountain but commonly known as Mount Good Hope is one of the principal summits of the Pacific Ranges of the southern Coast Mountains in British Columbia, Canada. It stands immediately west of Chilko Lake, with the highest peak on the massif rising between the lake's southern arms.

West of Mount Good Hope is the upper valley of the Southgate River, which drains to Bute Inlet near the mouth of the Homathko River; across the Southgate to the west is the Homathko Icefield, one of the largest ice-masses in the Coast Mountains. To Good Hope's south is the Bishop River, a tributary of the Southgate River, beyond which is Mount Raleigh. West of the pass between the Southgate River and Chilko Lake, and north of the Homathko Icefield, is a ridge crowned by Mount Queen Bess.

Its name is not directly from the Cape of Good Hope but rather from a ship named for it, the armoured cruiser HMS Good Hope which sank off the coast of Chile in the Battle of Coronel, November 1, 1914. Other summits within the same massif also carry ship names from World War I, such as Glasgow and Dawn Treader.

== Gallery ==
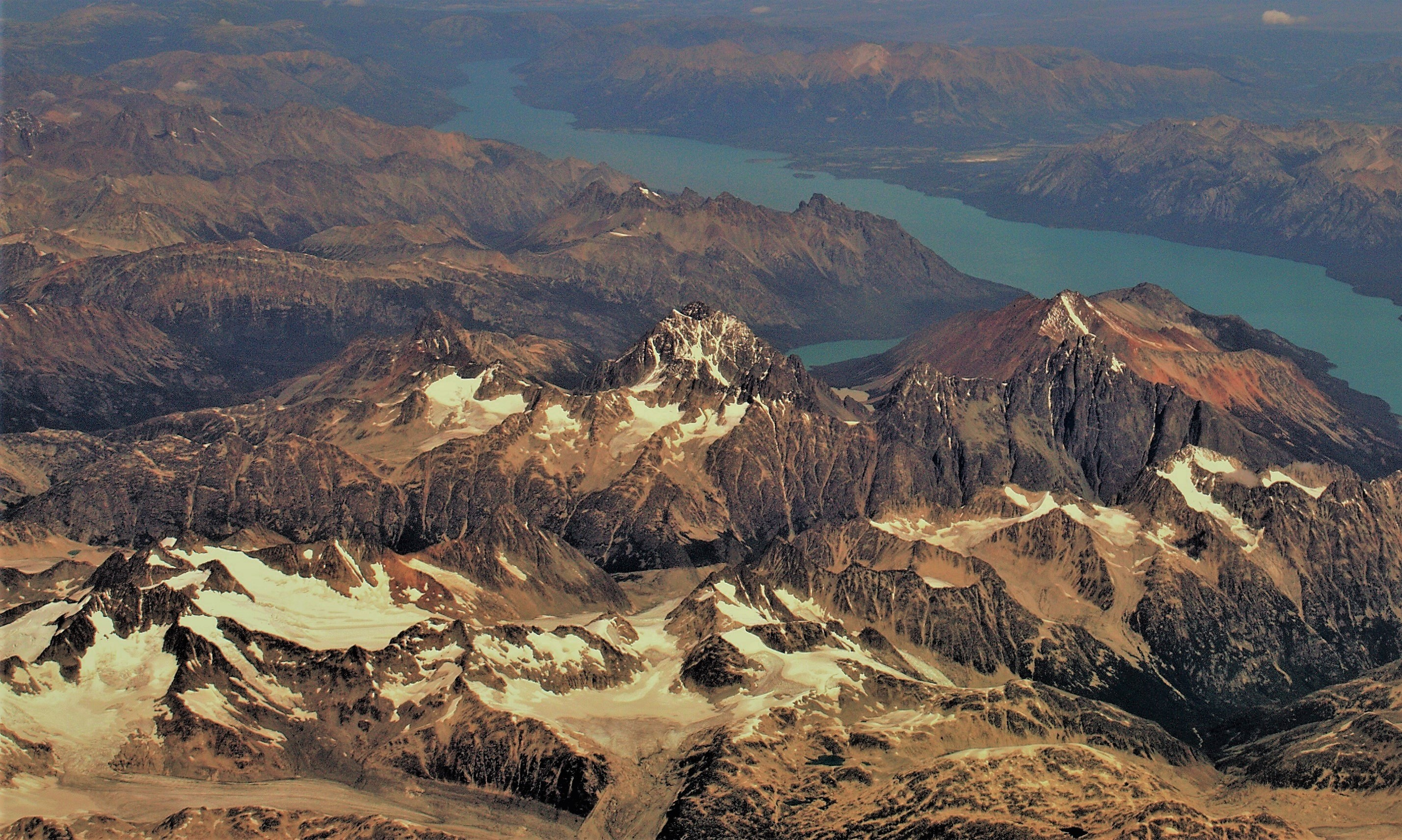
South aspect of Good Hope Mountain, centered (Chilko Lake upper right, Mount Farrow lower right)

== See also ==
- Mountain peaks of Canada
- Mountain peaks of North America
