= Teaquahan River =

River in Canada

Coordinates: 50°55′52″N 124°49′51″W

The Teaquahan River, formerly Teaquahan Creek, is a river in the Pacific Ranges of the Coast Mountains, flowing into the head of Bute Inlet at Waddington Harbour, immediately east of the mouth of the Homathko River.

== See also ==
- List of rivers of British Columbia
- Homathko Estuary Provincial Park
