= Mount Farrow =

Mountain in British Columbia, Canada

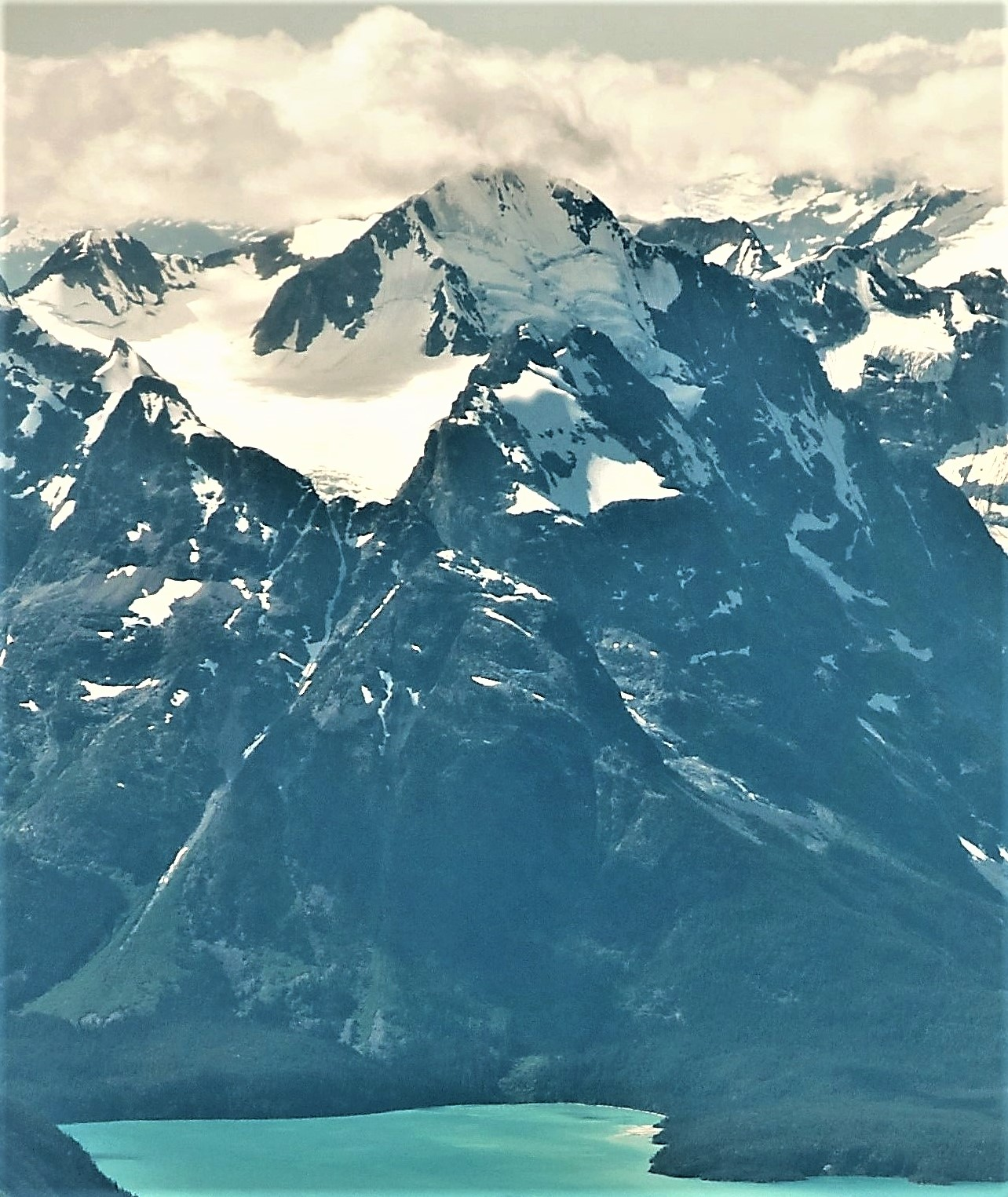
- Northeast aspect (aerial view)

Highest point
- Elevation: 2,890 m (9,480 ft)
- Prominence: 1,028 m (3,373 ft)
- Parent peak: Monmouth Mountain (3,182 m)
- Isolation: 6.64 km (4.13 mi)
- Listing: Mountains of British Columbia
- Coordinates: 51°05′50″N 124°06′36″W

Naming
- Etymology: Richard Charles Farrow

Geography
- Location within British Columbia
- Interactive map of Mount Farrow
- Country: Canada
- Province: British Columbia
- District: Range 2 Coast Land District
- Protected area: Ts'ilʔos Provincial Park
- Parent range: Coast Mountains
- Topo map: NTS 92N1 Chilko Mountain

Mount Farrow is a mountain summit in British Columbia, Canada.

== Description ==
Mount Farrow, elevation 2,890 m (9,480 ft), is part of the Coast Mountains. It is situated within Ts'ilʔos Provincial Park, east of the Homathko Icefield and just west of the southern tip of Chilko Lake. Farrow is set immediately west of Snow White Mountain, and Seven Dwarfs form Farrow's northeast ridge. The nearest higher neighbor is Good Hope Mountain, 6 km (3.7 mi) to the northwest. Precipitation runoff and glacial meltwater from the mountain drains north into Farrow Creek, and from the south slope into Norrington Creek, which both empty into Chilko Lake, thence Chilko River and ultimately the Fraser River. Topographic relief is significant as the summit rises 1,630 m (5,350 ft) above Farrow Creek in 2 km (1.2 mi).

== Etymology ==
The mountain is named after Major Richard C. Farrow (1892–1950), Comptroller of Water Rights (1946–1950) until the time of his sudden death on 20 February 1950. Farrow was born in England 11 August 1892, arrived in Canada in 1897 and received his education in Vancouver. He served with the Canadian Field Artillery and Royal Flying Corps in World War I. He joined the Provincial Civil Service in 1929 as a hydraulic engineer and was appointed Comptroller of Water Rights in 1946. Farrow's ashes were scattered over the area he had been examining for potential hydropower development at the head of Chilko Lake. The mountain's toponym was officially adopted March 7, 1951, by the Geographical Names Board of Canada.

== Climate ==
Based on the Köppen climate classification, Mount Farrow is located in the marine west coast climate zone of western North America. Most weather fronts originate in the Pacific Ocean, and travel east toward the Coast Mountains where they are forced upward by the range (Orographic lift), causing them to drop their moisture in the form of rain or snowfall. As a result, the Coast Mountains experience high precipitation, especially during the winter months in the form of snowfall. Winter temperatures can drop below −20 °C with wind chill factors below −30 °C. This climate supports the Farrow Glacier on the east slope, Map Glacier on the west slope, and other smaller unnamed glaciers surrounding the peak.

== Gallery ==
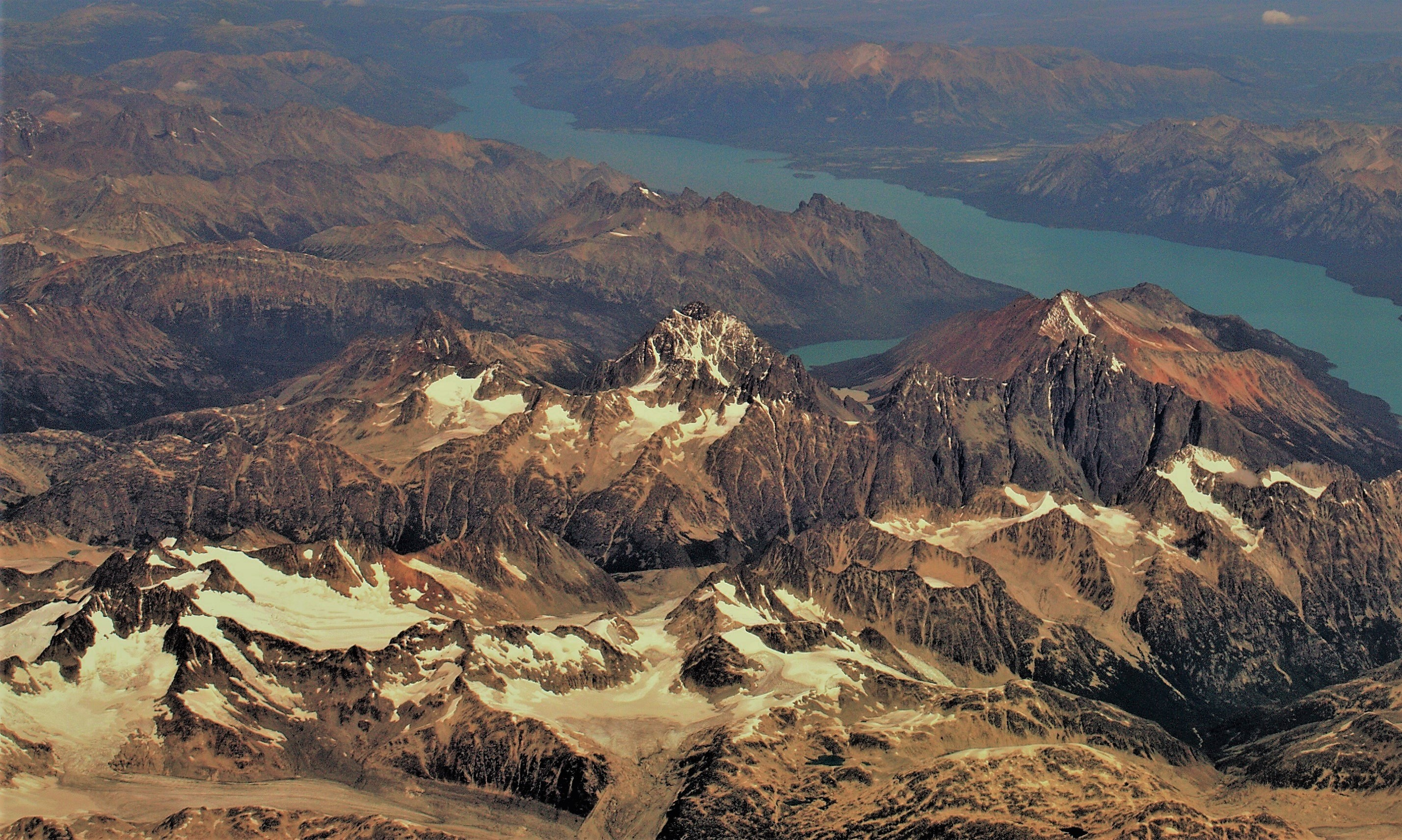
Aerial view of Mount Farrow in lower right. Good Hope Mountain centered.

== See also ==
- Geography of British Columbia
