= Mount Raleigh =

Mountain in the country of Canada

- Location within British Columbia

Highest point
- Elevation: 3,132 m (10,276 ft)
- Prominence: 1,372 m (4,501 ft)
- Parent peak: Mount Winstone (3135 m)
- Listing: Mountains of British Columbia
- Coordinates: 50°54′36″N 124°16′27″W

Geography
- Location: British Columbia, Canada
- District: Range 1 Coast Land District
- Parent range: Pacific Ranges
- Topo map: NTS 92K16 Mount Gilbert

Climbing
- First ascent: 1959 R. Hutchinson; J. Woodfield; J. Owen; W. Himmelsbach
- Easiest route: Rock/ice climb

Mount Raleigh, elevation 3,132 m (10,276 ft), is one of the principal summits of the Pacific Ranges of the Coast Mountains of southern British Columbia in Canada. It is located just southeast of the confluence of the Southgate and Bishop Rivers, northeast of the head of Bute Inlet, and is the highest summit south of the Bishop River's divide with the Lillooet River at Ring Pass, which is at the southeastern edge of the Lillooet Icefield and just north of the Pemberton Icecap. It is also the highest peak south of the pass between the upper basins of Chilko Lake and the Taseko Lakes, just north of which is Monmouth Mountain at 3,182 m (10,440 ft) (see Tsʼilʔos Provincial Park).

== Name origin ==
The mountain is named for Sir Walter Raleigh, and is one of several Elizabethan-themed summits in the area of the Southgate River, the highest of which is 3,298 m (10,820 ft) and, suitably, Mount Queen Bess named after Elizabeth I of England. Immediately south of Mount Raleigh in the same massif is Mount Gilbert, named for Raleigh's step-brother Sir Humphrey Gilbert. A bit farther south and slightly west is Tavistock Mountain, named for Raleigh's birthplace in Devon.

Many of these names were conferred in the 1930s by R.P. Bishop, namesake of the Bishop River. His namings, or those connected with him, include Mount Raleigh and Mount Sir Francis Drake, but others such as Mount Sussex, Oriana Peak and Madrigal Mountain were named by nomination of the Alpine Club of Canada in the 1980s.
