= Bishop River Provincial Park =

Provincial park of British Columbia

Coordinates: 50°55′N 124°02′W

- IUCN category Ib (wilderness area)
- Location within British Columbia
- Interactive map of Bishop River Provincial Park
- Area: 19,947 ha (77.02 sq mi)
- Established: June 15, 2000

Bishop River Provincial Park is a provincial park in the Pacific Ranges of the Coast Mountains on the Mainland of British Columbia, Canada, located southwest of and adjoining Ts'yl-os Provincial Park."Bishop River Park". BC Geographical Names. Government of British Columbia – B.C. Geographical Names Office (BCGNO). It lies along the upper course of the Bishop River, the main tributary of the Southgate River, from the Bishop's source at the western side of the Lillooet Icecap to midway along its course above its confluence with the Southgate. The park is 19,947 ha. in size. There are no roads or trails in the park although a forest service road from Waddington Harbour at the head of Bute Inlet leads up the Southgate to within a few miles of the park boundary.
