= ʔEniyud =

Mountain in British Columbia, Canada

- Niut Mountain
- Location within British Columbia
- Interactive map of ʔEniyud

Highest point
- Elevation: 2,877 m (9,439 ft)
- Prominence: 703 m (2,306 ft)
- Listing: Mountains of British Columbia
- Coordinates: 51°38′21″N 124°31′21″W

Naming
- Native name: ʔEniyud (Chilcotin)
- Pronunciation: Enni-yoot

Geography
- Location: Central Interior of British Columbia, Canada
- Parent range: Chilcotin Ranges
- Topo map: NTS 92N10 Razorback Mountain

ʔEniyud (pronounced Enni-yoot), also known as Niut Mountain, is one summits of the Chilcotin Ranges subdivision of the Pacific Ranges of the Coast Mountains of southern British Columbia. Standing West of Telhiqox Biny, it is 2,877 m (9,439 ft) in elevation.

== Name ==
The name Niut Mountain was officially adopted on 5 October 1960 and on 11 June 2020, the official name became ʔEniyud as recommended by Tŝilhqot’in National Government, with support from the Cariboo Regional District, BC Parks, the Association of Canadian Mountain Guides, BC Mountaineering Club and Avalanche Canada.

The Niut Range takes its name from Niut Mountain.

== See also ==
- Mountain peaks of Canada
- Mountain peaks of North America
- Geography of British Columbia
