= Mount Sir Francis Drake =

Mountain in British Columbia, Canada

- Location within British Columbia

Highest point
- Elevation: 2,705 m (8,875 ft)
- Prominence: 945 m (3,100 ft)
- Coordinates: 50°47′29″N 124°47′09″W

Geography
- Location: British Columbia, Canada
- District: Range 1 Coast Land District
- Parent range: Pacific Ranges
- Topo map: NTS 93D15 Kimsquit

Mount Sir Francis Drake, 2,705 metres (8,875 ft), is a mountain in the Pacific Ranges of British Columbia, Canada, standing above the south side of Waddington Harbour and the head of Bute Inlet on the Central Coast of British Columbia just south of the mouth of the Homathko River as it empties into that harbour and inlet.

== Name origin ==
The mountain was named in 1935, after the name was first proposed in 1928, in honour of Sir Francis Drake, the English explorer and privateer who was the first to sail an English ship in the Pacific Ocean and laid claim to Nova Albion, being lands to the north of Spanish California, in 1579, in the name of Elizabeth I. Current theories mostly place Point Reyes, California as being the location of that landing, but theories that he also landed farther northwards remain in circulation. In British Columbia Place Names by Helen B. and G.P.V. Akrigg, they posit Cape Blanco, Oregon as a possible site, while more recent publications by Samuel Bawlf advance the theory that further landings north of Cape Reyes happened in British Columbia and as far north as the Stikine River and the Southeast Alaska coast.

The mountain is one of a series of Elizabethan-related names in the Pacific Ranges conferred in the 1930s by R.P. Bishop, British Columbia Land Surveyor, others including Mount Queen Bess, Mount Sussex, and Mount Raleigh, as well as the Golden Hinde on Vancouver Island. Bishop's paper Drake's Course in the North Pacific was published in the British Columbia Historical Quarterly in 1939.
