= Mount Evans (British Columbia) =

Mountain in British Columbia, Canada

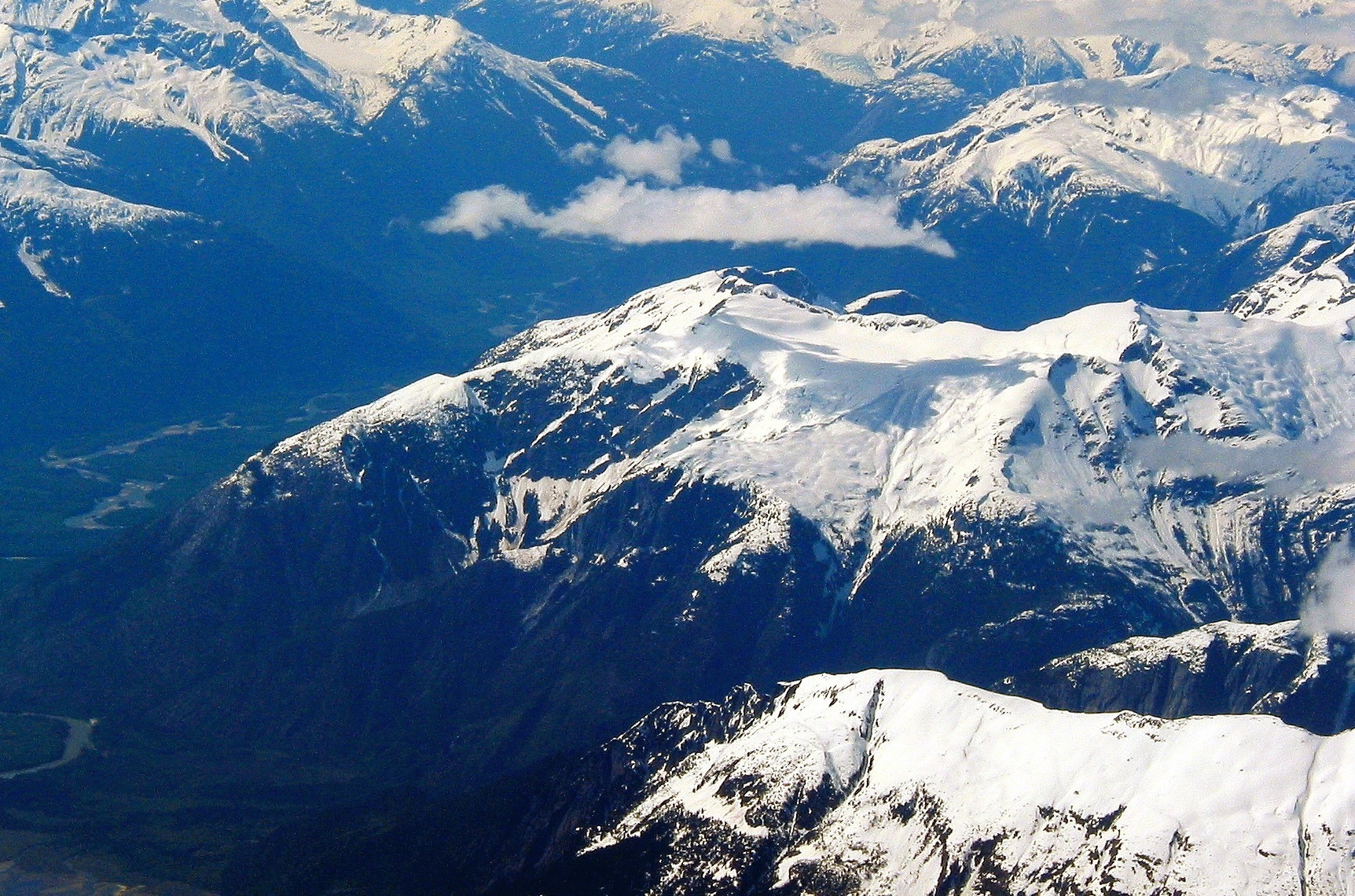
- Southeast aspect, centered

Highest point
- Elevation: 2,250 m (7,382 ft)
- Prominence: 150 m (492 ft)
- Parent peak: Teaquahan Mountain (2,532 m)
- Isolation: 4.5 km (2.8 mi)
- Listing: Mountains of British Columbia
- Coordinates: 50°59′42″N 124°51′04″W

Geography
- Location within British Columbia Location within Canada
- Interactive map of Mount Evans
- Country: Canada
- Province: British Columbia
- District: Range 1 Coast Land District
- Parent range: Coast Mountains
- Topo map: NTS 92K15 Southgate River

Mount Evans is a 2,250-metre (7,382-foot) glaciated summit in British Columbia, Canada.

== Description ==
Mount Evans is located in the Coast Mountains immediately north of the head of Bute Inlet and 4.5 kilometres (2.8 mi) south-southwest of Teaquahan Mountain, which is the nearest higher neighbor. Precipitation runoff and glacial meltwater from this mountain drains to Bute Inlet via the Homathko River and Teaquahan River. Mount Evans is more notable for its rise above local terrain than for its absolute elevation as topographic relief is significant with the summit rising 2,230 metres (7,316 ft) above the Homathko River Valley in five kilometres (3.1 mi). The mountain's toponym and current location were officially adopted January 15, 1987, by the Geographical Names Board of Canada, although the name was published in 1867 as labelled on British Admiralty chart 580. The mountain's name origin/significance is not recorded.

== Climate ==
Based on the Köppen climate classification, Mount Evans is located in the marine west coast climate zone of western North America. Most weather fronts originate in the Pacific Ocean, and travel east toward the Coast Mountains where they are forced upward by the range (orographic lift), causing them to drop their moisture in the form of rain or snowfall. As a result, the Coast Mountains experience high precipitation, especially during the winter months in the form of snowfall. Winter temperatures can drop below −20 °C with wind chill factors below −30 °C. This climate supports two unnamed glaciers on the slopes of the peak. The months July through September offer the most favorable weather for climbing Mount Evans.

== See also ==
- Geography of British Columbia
- Geology of British Columbia
