= Henry Snow Hall Jr. =

American alpinist (1895–1987)

- Henry Snow Hall in 1933
- Born: 3 June 1895; Boston, Massachusetts
- Died: 29 March 1987 (aged 91)

Henry Snow Hall Jr. (3 June 1895 – 29 March 1987) was an American mountaineer and patron of the American Alpine Club. He was also a trustee of the Boston Museum of Science.

== Early life ==
Hall was born June 3, 1895, in Boston, Massachusetts. He was educated at St. George's School (Rhode Island) and graduated from Harvard College with the Class of 1919. In World War I he was an infantry officer.

== Mountaineering ==
Hall's mountaineering took him to the Caucasus Mountains, the New Zealand Alps, the European Alps, Africa, Mexico, Japan and Colombia. He also climbed widely in North America. In particular, he returned year after year to the great peaks of the Canadian Rockies and British Columbia, especially to the Coast Range, often in company with Don Munday, Munday's wife Phyllis, and packer Batise Dester. He mounted eight expeditions to that area in the 1930s, some approaching from the ocean, others from the interior and has been described as "the most important Coast Mountain pioneer during the 1930s".

Hall was a member of the team which made the first ascent of the 5,959 m (19,551 ft) Mount Logan in Yukon (Canada's highest peak) in 1925, although he himself was not on the summit partly because he volunteered to help another member, who had frozen his feet, down the mountain from 17,000 feet.

He was involved in numerous other first ascents, including Mount French 3,244-metre (10,643-foot) in the Spray Mountains range of the Canadian Rockies (1921). Mount Clemenceau 3,664 m (12,021 ft), in the Park Ranges of the Canadian Rockies in August 1923. Mount Blackhorn 3,022 m (9,915 ft) and Mount Razorback 3,183 m (10,443 ft) in the Niut Range of the Coast Mountains, in August 1932. Mount Monarch 3,555 m (11,663 ft) in July 1936 and Silverthrone Mountain 2,864 m (9,396 ft) with the Mundays a few weeks later. He made most of his ascents in the 1930s with the guide Hans Fuhrer. (Note: p.119-120)

Although the summit heights of many of Hall's first ascents are relatively lowly, their significance should not be under-estimated. In the 1920s almost nothing was known about the mountainous coastal area extending 1000 miles north from Vancouver and climbers had made no significant explorations in the area. Even in the 2020s approaches to the mountain areas of the Coast Range are very difficult, often involving hazardous river crossings and commonly being choked with dense undergrowth, they "require strength and persistence" and even now "only a relatively few areas are routinely visited by mountaineers". Hall and Fuhrer showed remarkable determination during the summer of 1936 when they made the first ascents of Monarch and Silverthrone, both are in the Pacific Ranges and the summits are only about 40km apart but in order to move between them he needed to cover 1400km, travelling back to Vancouver, then up the coast before bushwhacking back inland. (Note: p.120)

Later first ascents include Whitesaddle Mountain 2,990 m (9,810 ft) in the Niut Range, in 1939. (Note: p.153) Mount Queen Bess 3,298 m (10,820 ft), one of the principal summits of the Pacific Ranges of the Coast Mountains, with the Mundays in 1942. Then in June 1947 Hall visited the Muskwa Ranges with Noel Odell, Frank Smythe and others, where they made the first ascent of Mount Lloyd George 2,938 m (9,639 ft).

Hall also made several expeditions to reconnoitre and to attempt Mount Waddington 4,019 m (13,186 ft): in 1931, 1932 and, with the Mundays, in 1933 and 1934. On 14 August 1934 the party reached the top of the north-west summit but concluded that they could not continue to the main summit (which is little more than 30m higher) because "the rock tower is next to unclimbable".

In mid-July 1941 he set out with Bradford Washburn, Barbara Washburn, Benjamin Ferris, Sterling Hendricks and William Shand to attempt the first ascent of Mount Hayes (4,216 m (13,832 ft)) in Alaska. On 29 July they managed to reach 12,650 ft. via the North Ridge but a storm was approaching and, with the summit only a little over 1000ft higher and just half a mile away, they decided they should descend to safety. On August 1 the party made another attempt, Hall remained in camp but the others were successful in making the first ascent of Mount Hayes. The route up the North Ridge wasn't repeated until 1975, it "is considered one of the great landmarks of Alaskan mountaineering because of its great technical difficulty at the time".

He was the first Honorary President of the American Alpine Club (1974), after having served as president (1950–1952), secretary (for 15 years) and director. He was also one of the founders of the Harvard Mountaineering Club, in 1924 and later became its Honorary President. He was President of the Harvard Travellers Club and in 1962 he was elected to Honorary membership of the Alpine Club.

== Legacy ==
In 1941, as part of the leadership of the American Alpine Club, he was involved in convincing General George Marshall that the United States needed trained mountain troops so that the war could be won in Europe and perhaps elsewhere. This led to the formation of the 87th Mountain Infantry Regiment, which saw service in the Aleutian Islands in 1943, and later became part of the 10th Mountain Division.

Hall "generously gave financial assistance to numerous climbers and expeditions" he both helped financially, and gave aid to many mountaineering expeditions throughout his life and it was "in Henry's library and livingroom that many great American mountaineering accomplishments were generated and planned".

Hall was a supporter of the American Alpine Club Library which was established in 1916 and is now regarded as "one of the world's finest collections of mountain-related artifacts, archives, rare books, maps, and media". It is now named the Henry S. Hall Jr. American Alpine Club Library.

The Boston Museum of Science received a bequest of $3 million from Hall's estate which was used to setup a permanent endowment fund, the Henry Snow Hall Jr. Fund, with the income generated to be used for the development of new exhibits. To commemorate his long term involvement as a trustee for 40 years and his financial support over those years, the Museum named its new wing "The Hall Wing".

Hall married Lydia Lyman Storer in 1920. Their daughter, Edith Paine Hall Overly (1921–2018), later became a trustee of the Boston Museum of Science.
