= Mount Evans (disambiguation) =

Mount Blue Sky (formerly Mount Evans) is a peak in Colorado.

Mount Evans or Mountevans may also refer to:

- Mount Evans (Alberta), a summit
- Mount Evans (Antarctica), a mountain
- Mount Evans (British Columbia), in the Coast Mountains
- Baron Mountevans, an English peerage title
- The codename for Intel's E2000 infrastructure processing unit (IPU) integrated circuit chip

== See also ==
- Evans Peak
