= Monarch Mountain (British Columbia) =

Mountain in British Columbia, Canada

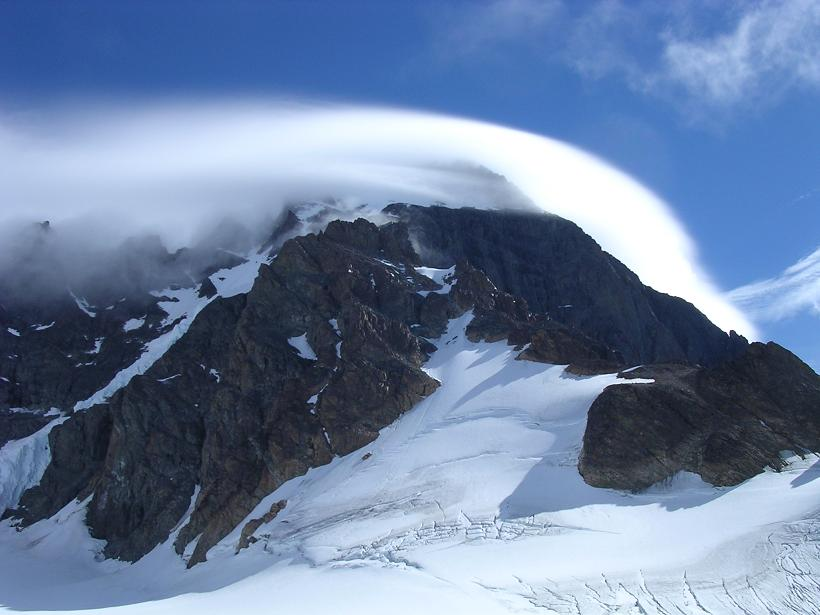

Highest point
- Elevation: 3,555 m (11,663 ft)
- Prominence: 2,930 m (9,610 ft)
- Listing: Mountains of British Columbia; World most prominent peaks 105th; North America prominent 19th; Canada highest major peaks 42nd; Canada most prominent peaks 6th
- Coordinates: 51°53′58″N 125°52′33″W

Geography
- Location within British Columbia
- Country: Canada
- Province: British Columbia
- District: Range 2 Coast Land District
- Parent range: Pacific Ranges of the Coast Mountains
- Topo map: NTS 92N13 Knot Lakes

Climbing
- First ascent: 16 July 1936 by Henry Snow Hall Jr. and Hans Fuhrer
- Easiest route: rock/ice climb

Monarch Mountain is one of the principal summits of the Pacific Ranges subdivision of the Coast Mountains in southern British Columbia. It stands just east of a pass between the Klinaklini River and the south branch of the Atnarko River, which is a tributary of the Bella Coola River. Surrounding Monarch Mountain is the Monarch Icefield, the northernmost of the major icefields of the Pacific Ranges, and just south of it is the Ha-Iltzuk Icefield, which is the largest. Monarch is in the southern end of Tweedsmuir South Provincial Park.

== Climbing ==
The first ascent of the mountain was made on 16 July 1936 by Henry Snow Hall Jr. and Hans Fuhrer.

== Climate ==
The summit of Monarch Mountain has an ice cap climate (EF).

Climate data for Monarch Mountain Peak 1981–2010 (51.899 -125.876)
Month	Jan	Feb	Mar	Apr	May	Jun	Jul	Aug	Sep	Oct	Nov	Dec	Year
Mean daily maximum °C (°F)	−9.7 (14.5)	−11.2 (11.8)	−10.8 (12.6)	−10.4 (13.3)	−5.9 (21.4)	−2.9 (26.8)	−0.2 (31.6)	0.0 (32.0)	−2.9 (26.8)	−6.4 (20.5)	−9.4 (15.1)	−10.1 (13.8)	−6.7 (20.0)
Daily mean °C (°F)	−11.9 (10.6)	−14.0 (6.8)	−14.3 (6.3)	−13.1 (8.4)	−8.5 (16.7)	−5.3 (22.5)	−2.5 (27.5)	−1.2 (29.8)	−3.3 (26.1)	−8.3 (17.1)	−12.2 (10.0)	−12.7 (9.1)	−8.9 (15.9)
Mean daily minimum °C (°F)	−14.1 (6.6)	−16.7 (1.9)	−17.8 (0.0)	−15.9 (3.4)	−11.1 (12.0)	−7.7 (18.1)	−4.8 (23.4)	−2.4 (27.7)	−3.6 (25.5)	−10.2 (13.6)	−15.0 (5.0)	−15.2 (4.6)	−11.2 (11.8)
Average precipitation mm (inches)	399 (15.7)	284 (11.2)	297 (11.7)	239 (9.4)	85 (3.3)	91 (3.6)	79 (3.1)	113 (4.4)	163 (6.4)	390 (15.4)	504 (19.8)	340 (13.4)	2,984 (117.4)
Source: http://www.climatewna.com/ClimateBC_Map.aspx

== See also ==
- Geography of British Columbia
- Mountain peaks of North America
- List of Ultras of Canada
