= Bishop River =

River in Canada

Coordinates: 50°58′36″N 124°21′36″W

The Bishop River is a river in the Pacific Ranges of the Coast Mountains, flowing west from the western edge of the Lillooet Icecap to join the Southgate River east of the Homathko Icefield. Bishop River Provincial Park surrounds the upper course of the river, from the source at the Lillooet Icecap to midway along its course above its confluence with the Southgate.

== Name origin ==
The Bishop River was named for Richard Preston Bishop, born September 18, 1884, in Starcross, Devon, who was a British Columbia Land Surveyor. He had been an officer in the Royal Navy in 1906-07 and served as a captain in World War I, but returned to British Columbia to resume work as a surveyor. Many mountains in the Pacific Ranges, including Mount Sir Francis Drake and Mount Queen Bess, and the Golden Hinde on Vancouver Island, were named in the 1930s as proposed by him. He died in Victoria on February 13, 1954. Of the many Elizabethan-era names in the Coast Mountains, many are in the area of the Bishop River, including Mount Raleigh which stands on the southeast side of the Bishop-Southgate confluence. The Bishop River was named during his lifetime, in 1924, until then it had been known as the East Fork Southgate River.

== See also ==
- List of rivers of British Columbia
- Bishop (disambiguation)
