= Monmouth Mountain =

Mountain in the country of Canada

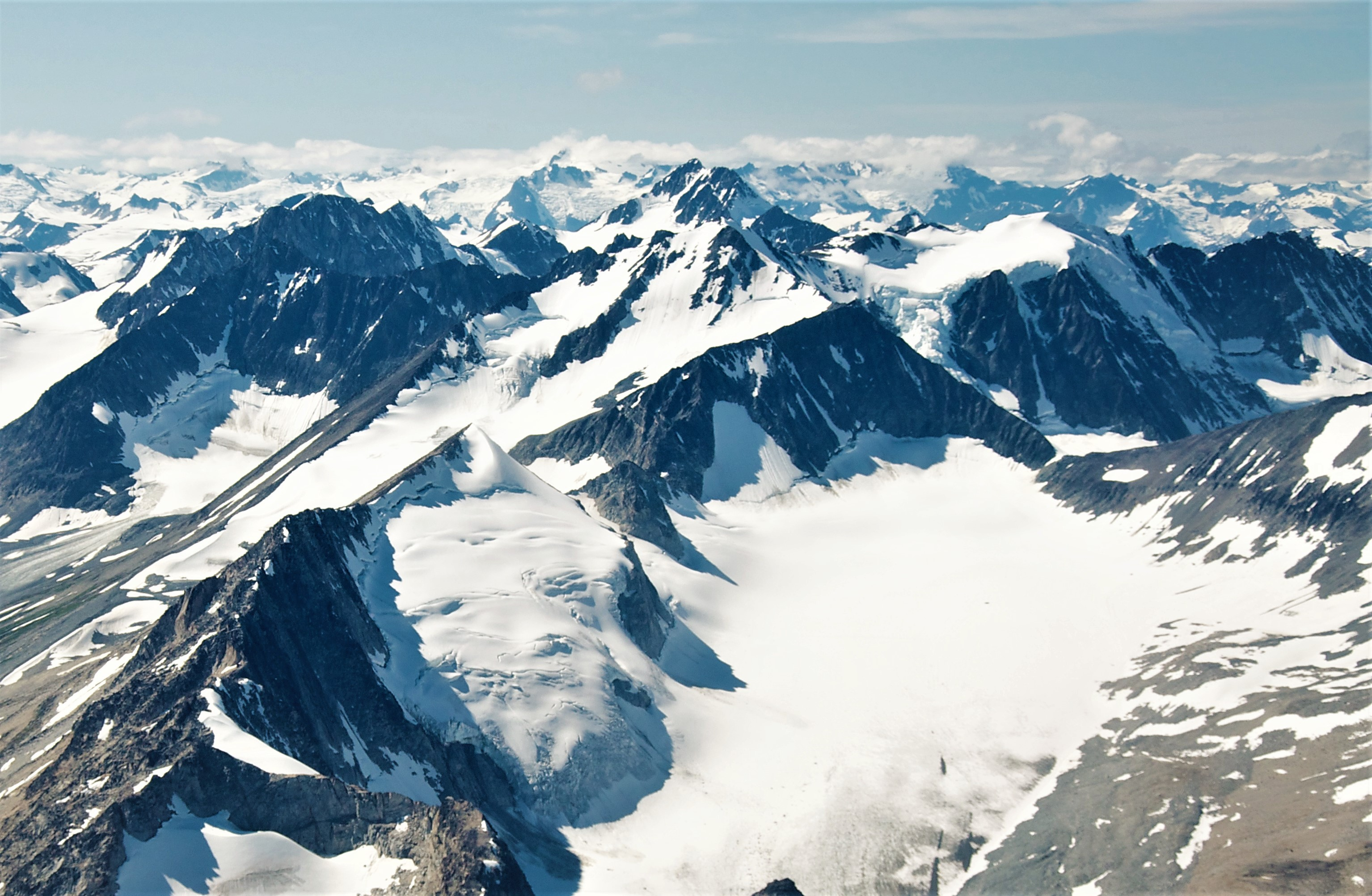
- Top of Monmouth Mountain centered at top. Aerial view from ENE.

Highest point
- Elevation: 3,182 m (10,440 ft)
- Prominence: 1,602 m (5,256 ft)
- Parent peak: Good Hope Mountain (3242 m)
- Listing: Mountains of British Columbia; Canada highest major peaks 60th; Canada prominent peaks 107th
- Coordinates: 50°59′30″N 123°47′24″W

Geography
- Location within British Columbia
- Location: British Columbia, Canada
- District: Lillooet Land District
- Parent range: Chilcotin Ranges
- Topo map: NTS 92J13 Stanley Smith Glacier

Climbing
- First ascent: 1951 by A. Melville, I. Kay, N. Carter, T. Marston, D. Blair, W. Sparling, H. Genschorek
- Easiest route: rock/ice climb

Monmouth Mountain, commonly known as Mount Monmouth is one of the principal summits of the Pacific Ranges of the Coast Mountains of southern British Columbia in Canada. At 3,182 m (10,440 ft), it is the highest summit of the Chilcotin Ranges. It stands just north of the Lillooet Icecap between the heads of Chilko Lake and the Taseko Lakes. West of Chilko Lake's south arm is Mount Good Hope 3,242 m (10,636 ft) and, beyond it, the massif surrounding Mount Queen Bess 3,298 m (10,820 ft), which is the highest summit east of the Homathko River.

The namesake of this peak was HMS Monmouth, an aging British armoured cruiser which was sunk at the Battle of Coronel in 1914 along with HMS Good Hope (for which Good Hope Mountain is named) off the coast of South America by German cruisers under Admiral Von Spee.

== See also ==
- Mountain peaks of North America
