= Mosley Creek =

Location
- Country: Canada
- Province: British Columbia
- District: Range 2 Coast Land District

Physical characteristics
- Source: Unnamed lake 11 km (6.8 mi) west of Tatla Lake.
  - location: Coast Mountains
  - coordinates: 51°52′37″N 124°45′26″W
  - elevation: 1,483 m (4,865 ft)
- Mouth: Homathko River
  - location: Just east of the Tiedmann Glacier that descends from Mount Waddington in the Coast Mountains.
  - coordinates: 51°18′22″N 124°45′20″W
  - elevation: 323 m (1,060 ft)
- Length: 85 km (53 mi)
- Discharge
  - average: 48.9 m^{3}/s (1,730 cu ft/s)

Mosely Creek is a large creek in the Pacific Ranges of the Coast Mountains in British Columbia, Canada, flowing southwest to join the Homathko River in its canyon downstream from Tatlayoko Lake, and a short distance above Murderers Bar at 51°16′00″N 124°54′00″W, which is the site of the opening events of the Chilcotin War of 1864.

Tiedemann Creek, which begins at the Tiedemann Glacier on Mount Waddington, is a tributary of Mosley Creek, flowing east from its source to the confluence at 51°18′38″N 124°50′39″W, just above the confluence with the Homathko.

The creek is named for Edwin Mosley or Mosely who was one of three settler survivors of the Chilcotin War of 1864.

Also flowing into Mosley Creek is Tellot Creek at 51°21′07″N 124°53′40″W, flowing southeast, which was named for one of the war chiefs of the Tsilhqot'in who took part in the massacre of Alfred Waddington's work party that touched off the Chilcotin War.

== See also ==
- List of rivers of British Columbia
