= Homathko Estuary Provincial Park =

Provincial park in British Columbia, Canada

Homathko Provincial Park
- IUCN category II (national park)
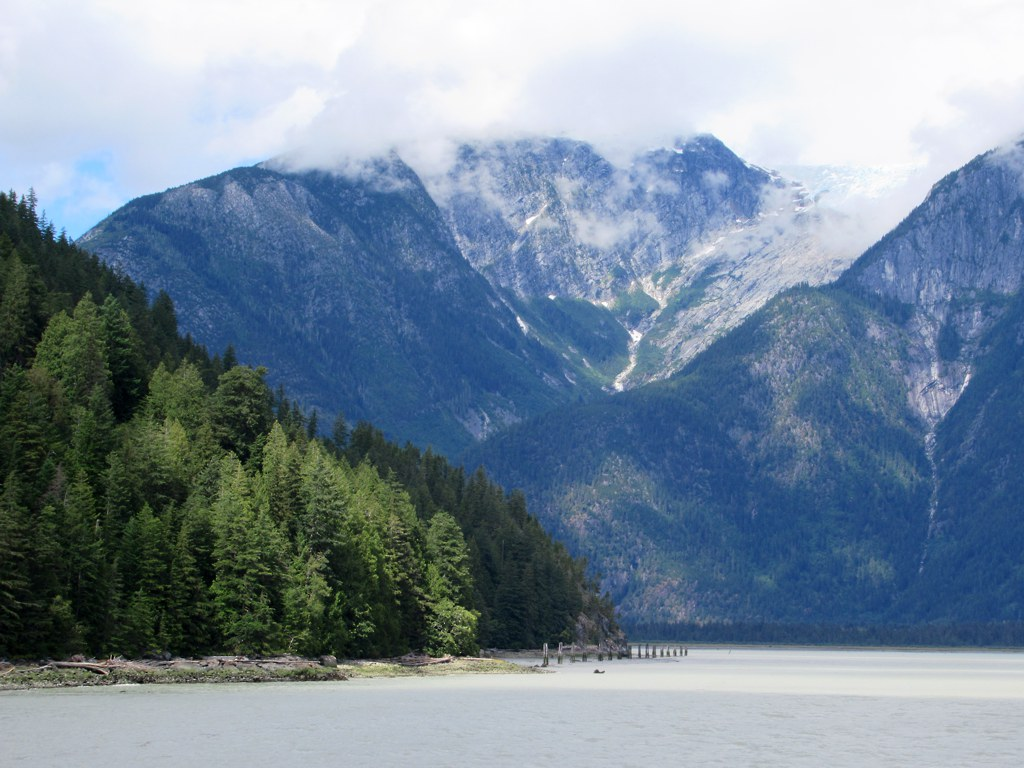
- A view of the Homathko River Estuary on Waddington Harbour

- Location within British Columbia
- Interactive map of Homathko Provincial Park
- Location: Range 1 Coast Land District, British Columbia, Canada
- Nearest city: Campbell River, BC
- Coordinates: 50°56′04″N 124°50′40″W
- Area: 450 ha (1,100 acres)
- Established: July 23, 1997
- Governing body: BC Parks

Homathko Estuary Provincial Park is a provincial park in British Columbia, Canada, located at the head of Bute Inlet surrounding the mouth of the Homathko River in the Pacific Ranges of the Coast Mountains.

== See also ==
- Great Canyon of the Homathko
- Homathko Icefield
- Homathko River-Tatlayoko Protected Area
- Bishop River Provincial Park
