= Compton Névé =

Névé in British Columbia, Canada

Coordinates: 50°49′00″N 124°11′00″W

The Compton Névé is a névé in the Pacific Ranges of the Coast Mountains in southwestern British Columbia, Canada, located southeast of the Homathko Icefield and Mount Gilbert and to the south of the Bishop River. It lies west of the Lillooet Icecap and is connected to it by the Ring Glacier, which sits astride Ring Pass, the divide between the Lillooet and Bishop Rivers, and has an area of 714 km^{2} (276 sq mi).
