= Mount Evans (Alberta) =

Summit in Alberta, Canada

- Location within Alberta

Highest point
- Elevation: 3,210 m (10,530 ft)
- Prominence: 411 m (1,348 ft)
- Parent peak: Mount Hooker (3287 m)
- Listing: Mountains of Alberta
- Coordinates: 52°26′31″N 118°07′46″W

Geography
- Country: Canada
- Province: Alberta
- Protected area: Jasper National Park
- Parent range: Park Ranges
- Topo map: NTS 83D8 Athabasca Pass

Climbing
- First ascent: July 5, 1924 by W.R. Hainsworth, J.G. Hillhouse, M.M. Strumia, J. Monroe Thorington, Conrad Kain

Mount Evans is a summit in Jasper National Park, Alberta, Canada.

Mount Evans was named by G.E. Howard in 1914 after Admiral Edward R. G. R. Evans, an Antarctic explorer.

== See also ==
Mount Evans (disambiguation)
