= Mount Queen Bess =

Peak in the Coast Mountains of southern British Columbia, Canada

- Location within British Columbia

Highest point
- Elevation: 3,298 m (10,820 ft)
- Prominence: 2,355 m (7,726 ft)
- Listing: Mountains of British Columbia; North America prominent 47th; Canada highest major peaks 52nd; Canada most prominent 18th
- Coordinates: 51°16′18″N 124°34′06″W

Geography
- Location: British Columbia, Canada
- District: Range 2 Coast Land District
- Parent range: Pacific Ranges
- Topo map: NTS 92N7 Mount Queen Bess

Climbing
- First ascent: 20 July 1942 by Don Munday, Phyllis Munday, Henry Hall
- Easiest route: Rock/ice climb

Mount Queen Bess is one of the principal summits of the Pacific Ranges of the Coast Mountains of southern British Columbia. It stands west of Chilko Lake and to the south of Tatlayoko Lake, and crowns a peak-studded ridge to the north of the Homathko Icefield.

The mountain is named for Queen Elizabeth I of England. Relatively nearby is Mount Raleigh, named for Sir Walter Raleigh. Other peaks in the vicinity of Queen Bess bear similar Elizabethan-related names: Pembroke, Silver Swan, Oriana, Armada, Grenville, Burghley, Howard, Walsingham, Cambridge, Cloister, Saint John, Galleon, and Monmouth. Between Queen Bess and Chilko Lake is Mount Good Hope, and northwest across the Homathko is the Waddington Range, site of the highest peak in the Coast Mountains, and the highest entirely within British Columbia, Mount Waddington.

== See also ==
- Mountain peaks of Canada
- Mountain peaks of North America
- Royal eponyms in Canada
