= Mount Clemenceau =

Mountain in British Columbia, Canada

- Location within British Columbia

Highest point
- Elevation: 3,664 m (12,021 ft)
- Prominence: 1,499 m (4,918 ft)
- Parent peak: Mount Columbia (3,747 m)
- Listing: Canada highest major peaks 32nd; Mountains of British Columbia
- Coordinates: 52°14′51″N 117°57′28″W

Geography
- Location: British Columbia, Canada
- District: Kootenay Land District
- Parent range: Park Ranges
- Topo map: NTS 83C4 Clemenceau Icefield

Climbing
- First ascent: 9 August 1923 by Henry DeVilliers-Schwab; W. Harris; Henry S. Hall Jr; D. Durand
- Easiest route: glacier/snow climb

Mount Clemenceau is the fourth highest mountain in the Park Ranges of the Canadian Rockies. The peak was originally named "Pyramid" in 1892 by Arthur Coleman. The mountain was renamed by the Interprovincial Boundary Survey in 1919 to its present name, which is for Georges Clemenceau, premier of France during World War I.

Mount Clemenceau was first climbed in 1923 by D.B. Durand, H.S. Hall, W.D. Harris and H.B. De V. Schwab.

== Routes ==
There are three standard climbing routes:

- West Face II
  - This is the normal route, similar to the north glacier route (normal) on Mount Athabasca but considered more interesting. The route avoids the steepest parts of the face.
- North-East Ridge IV
- North Face IV

== See also ==
- List of mountains in the Canadian Rockies
- List of mountain peaks of North America
- List of mountain peaks of the Rocky Mountains
