= Tatlayoko Lake, British Columbia =

Community in British Columbia, Canada

Tatlayoko Lake Tehiqox Biny
- Location of Tatlayoko Lake in British Columbia Tatlayoko Lake (Canada)
- Coordinates: 51°42′59″N 124°26′05″W
- Country: Canada
- Province: British Columbia

Tatlayoko Lake is an unincorporated settlement and locality on the Homathko River just north of that river's entry into the lake of same name, which is located in the western Chilcotin Country of the Central Interior of British Columbia, Canada.

== Climate ==
The name Tatlayoko is an anglicization of Telhiqox Biny, the Tsilhqotʼin language name, which means "lake of the big winds." True to its name, the community is windy throughout the fall and winter as the warm Chinook winds blow up the valley; which attracts windsurfers and kiteboarders. The Chilcotin Plateau is known for being extremely cold in the winter, but Tatlayoko Lake is an exception thanks to its proximity to the mild Pacific Ocean. While the coastal winds bring the community relatively mild winters, the mountains block most of the coastal precipitation, leaving the community comparatively dry.

In relation to the nearby community of Tatla Lake and indeed the rest of the Chilcotin Plateau off to the east, Tatlayoko Lake tends to be wetter in the winter and drier in the summer. Tatlayoko Lake has a continental climate (Dfb), bordering on a subarctic climate (Dfc).

The hottest temperature on record on 29 June 2021 when the temperature climbed to 39.6 °C (103.3 °F).

== History ==
Tatlayoko Lake is part of the land claim of the Tsilhqot'in People of Xeni (aka Xeni Gwet'in First Nation or the Nemaia Valley Indian Band) and is called by them Talhiqox Biny ("biny"-"lake"). One of their number, Klattasine or Klatsassan, led a party of warriors to attack a crew building a gold-rush era route known as Waddington's Road in the Homathko's canyons, which was the opening round of the Chilcotin War of 1864. Relief troops, including the governor of the colony's own party and escort, came to the Chilcotin via Tatlayoko Lake.

Tatlayoko Lake and the Homathko River are components in a proposed diversion project involving Chilko Lake, across the mountains on the east side of the lake. Run-of-the-river hydroelectric licenses have been let for the Homathko downstream from the lake.

== Lake ==
Tatlayoko Lake
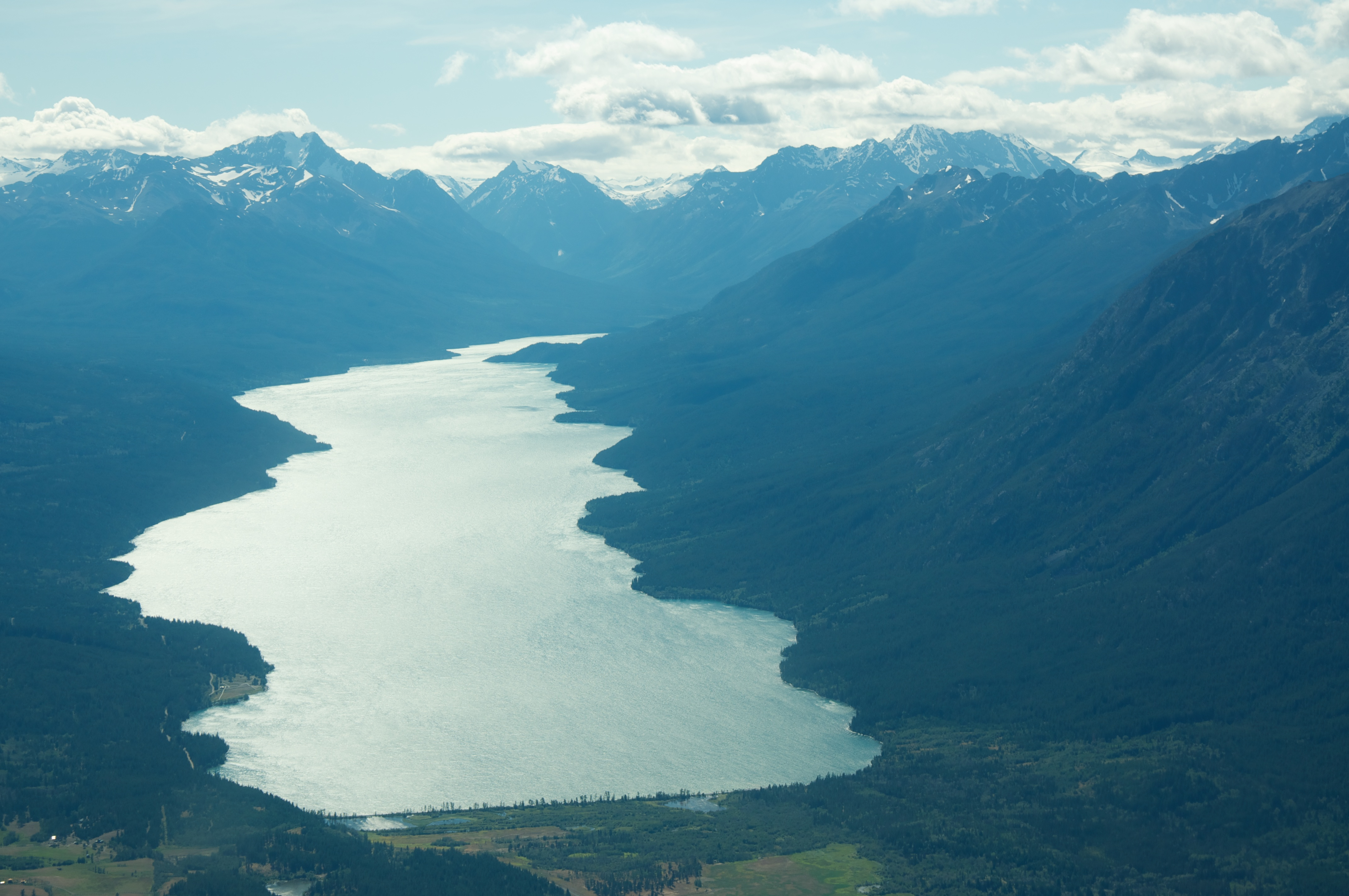

- Location within British Columbia
- Location: Chilcotin District, British Columbia
- Coordinates: 51°33′00″N 124°24′50″W
- Primary inflows: Homathko River
- Primary outflows: Homathko River
- Basin countries: Canada
- Max. length: 14.4 mi (23.2 km)
- Max. width: 1.5 mi (2.4 km)
- Surface area: 9,880.8 acres (39.986 km^{2})
- Average depth: 349.2 ft (106.4 m)
- Max. depth: 688 ft (210 m)
- Water volume: 4.26 cubic kilometres (1.02 mi^{3})
- Residence time: 17.9 years
- Shore length^{1}: 175,050 ft (53,360 m)
- Surface elevation: 2,714 ft (827 m)
- Settlements: Tatlayoko Lake
- ^{1} Shore length is not a well-defined measure.

The eponymous lake is a lake on the Homathko River in the western Chilcotin District of the Central Interior of British Columbia, Canada, located on a north-south axis just upstream of the entrance of the series of canyons of the Homathko, including the Great Canyon of the Homathko, on its route to the sea at the head of Bute Inlet.

== Etymology ==
The first comprehensive map of British Columbia was produced under the authority of Joseph Trutch, and was published in 1871. This map gives the name as Ta tlah co Lake, which is similar to the Tsilhqot'in name Telhiqox. A few years later, George Dawson surveyed the geology of the area, and his 1878 report to the Geological Survey of Canada used the spelling Tatlayoco. Maps of British Columbia published in the 1880s and 1890s continued to use minor variations of Tatlahco Lake, while many geological publications used Dawson's spelling of Tatlayoco.

The existence of many different spellings for a geographic location was not unusual for that era, and the Geographic Board of Canada was established in 1897 to standardize these spellings. Their "Rules of Nomenclature" included the following:

- The name that is published first will be preferred
- If an indigenous name is used, the spelling should approximate the true pronunciation
- The name should not include any redundant or unpronounced letters
- Any hard "c" should be replaced with a "k"

The Geographic Board of Canada was unaware that the lake was named Tatlahco, which they erroneously thought was a name for a tributary to the Bella Coola River. They were only aware of Dawson's spelling of Tatlayoco, which they adopted as the official name in 1911, after changing the hard "c" to a "k". The name therefore came to be spelled Tatlayoko, despite the fact that Tatlahco was published first, is a better approximation of the original Tsilhqot'in word, and reflects the actual pronunciation of the name (TA-tla-ko). According to the Rules of Nomenclature, Tatlahco should have been respelled Tatlako.

=== Weather facts ===
- Driest year (2002) = 264 mm (10.4 in)
- Wettest year (1950) = 626 mm (24.6 in)
- Warmest year (1941) = 5.9 °C (42.6 °F)
- Coldest year (1957) = 2.2 °C (36.0 °F)

Climate data for Tatlayoko Lake
Month	Jan	Feb	Mar	Apr	May	Jun	Jul	Aug	Sep	Oct	Nov	Dec	Year
Record high °C (°F)	15.6 (60.1)	17.8 (64.0)	21.4 (70.5)	29.4 (84.9)	33.5 (92.3)	39.6 (103.3)	37.8 (100.0)	35.3 (95.5)	32.2 (90.0)	27.8 (82.0)	18.3 (64.9)	15 (59)	39.6 (103.3)
Mean daily maximum °C (°F)	−0.7 (30.7)	3.0 (37.4)	7.2 (45.0)	11.8 (53.2)	16.1 (61.0)	19.3 (66.7)	22.4 (72.3)	22.7 (72.9)	18.6 (65.5)	11.5 (52.7)	3.1 (37.6)	−1.6 (29.1)	11.1 (52.0)
Daily mean °C (°F)	−5.7 (21.7)	−2.9 (26.8)	0.7 (33.3)	4.5 (40.1)	8.3 (46.9)	11.6 (52.9)	13.9 (57.0)	13.9 (57.0)	10.1 (50.2)	4.8 (40.6)	−1.6 (29.1)	−6.3 (20.7)	4.3 (39.7)
Mean daily minimum °C (°F)	−10.5 (13.1)	−8.7 (16.3)	−5.7 (21.7)	−2.8 (27.0)	0.6 (33.1)	3.7 (38.7)	5.4 (41.7)	5.0 (41.0)	1.5 (34.7)	−1.8 (28.8)	−6.2 (20.8)	−11.1 (12.0)	−2.6 (27.3)
Record low °C (°F)	−43.3 (−45.9)	−37.2 (−35.0)	−32.8 (−27.0)	−21.1 (−6.0)	−10 (14)	−5 (23)	−3 (27)	−4 (25)	−9.5 (14.9)	−27 (−17)	−39 (−38)	−40.6 (−41.1)	−43.3 (−45.9)
Record low wind chill	−45	−37	−36	−20	−13	−6	−5	−5	−11	−22	−41	−39	−45
Average precipitation mm (inches)	42.2 (1.66)	23.2 (0.91)	26.7 (1.05)	20.0 (0.79)	31.9 (1.26)	37.3 (1.47)	39.6 (1.56)	33.8 (1.33)	26.9 (1.06)	53.7 (2.11)	55.3 (2.18)	47.0 (1.85)	435.5 (17.15)
Average rainfall mm (inches)	20.2 (0.80)	9.9 (0.39)	14.6 (0.57)	15.0 (0.59)	29.8 (1.17)	37.3 (1.47)	39.6 (1.56)	33.8 (1.33)	26.5 (1.04)	50.2 (1.98)	31.5 (1.24)	16.7 (0.66)	324.7 (12.78)
Average snowfall cm (inches)	20.0 (7.9)	13.4 (5.3)	12.1 (4.8)	5.0 (2.0)	2.1 (0.8)	0.0 (0.0)	0.0 (0.0)	0.0 (0.0)	0.4 (0.2)	3.5 (1.4)	23.8 (9.4)	30.7 (12.1)	110.8 (43.6)
Average relative humidity (%) (at 15:00 LST)	70.0	55.0	53.1	38.6	43.8	46.1	37.3	34.6	36.8	47.4	70.7	73.0	50.5
Source: Environment and Climate Change Canada
