= Mount Grenville =

Mountain in British Columbia, Canada

Coordinates: 50°58′25″N 124°31′43″W

Mount Grenville is the highest summit of the Homathko Icefield of the Pacific Ranges of the Coast Mountains, east of the head of Bute Inlet. It has a height of 3,126 metres (10,256 ft) and a prominence of 1,101 metres (3,612 ft). It is located at the southern edge of the icefield and is one of a large group of summits in this region to be named for figures of the Elizabethan era, or with other Elizabethan associations (e.g. the icefield includes Armada Peak and Galleon Peak).
