= Lillooet Icecap =

Icefield in British Columbia, Canada

Coordinates: 50°45′N 123°45′W

The Lillooet Icecap, also called the Lillooet Icefield or the Lillooet Crown, is a large icefield in the Pacific Ranges of the Coast Mountains in southwestern British Columbia, Canada. It is about 90 km (56 mi) northwest of the towns of Pemberton and Whistler, and about 175 km (109 mi) north of Vancouver, British Columbia. The Lillooet Icecap is one of the largest of several large icefields in the Pacific Ranges which are the largest temperate-latitude glacial fields in the world. At its maximum extent including its glacial tongues it measures 30 km (19 mi) east to west and 20 km (12 mi) north to south; its central icefield area is approximately 15 km (9 mi) in diameter.

The Lillooet Icecap is the source of several major rivers which radiate out from it in a wheel pattern. The Lillooet River is fed by the Lillooet Glacier on the icefield's southern flank and runs southeast via Pemberton to Harrison Lake. The Bridge River is fed by the Bridge Glacier on the icefield's eastern flank and runs east to the town of Lillooet. On the icefield's north side are the Taseko River (a tributary of the Chilcotin River), the Lord and Tchaikazan Rivers (tributaries of the Taseko), and the Edmond River which feeds Chilko Lake, the source of the Chilko River, which like the Taseko is a tributary of the Chilcotin River. On the west side of the icecap are the sources of the Southgate River runs to Waddington Harbour at the head of Bute Inlet and shares a common delta with the Homathko River, and the Toba River, which runs to Toba Inlet.

The divide between the Lillooet and Southgate Rivers is on the southwestern flank of the icefield and is named Ring Pass. This was investigated for a possible route for the Canadian Pacific Railway but the survey party led by Stanley Smith was lost and never found. The Stanley Smith Glacier and Frank Smith Glacier in the central area of the Lillooet Icecap are named in their memory. Southwest of Ring Pass is the Compton Névé, another large icecap. The Lillooet Icecap and Compton Névé form one contiguous icemass, but because they are two distinct massifs of the lower elevation and active glacial movement in Ring Pass they have been customarily considered to be separate.

== See also ==
- Mount Meager massif
- Tsʼilʔos Provincial Park
- Homathko Icefield
