= Tatla Lake, British Columbia =

Community and eponymous lake

Tatla Lake
- Unincorporated community
- Location in British Columbia
- Coordinates: 51°54′16″N 124°36′04″W
- Country: Canada
- Province: British Columbia
- Region: Chilcotin
- Regional district: Cariboo
- Between: Williams Lake and Bella Coola
- Elevation: 922 m (3,025 ft)
- Time zone: UTC-8
- Postal Code: V0L 1V0
- Area code: 250

Tatla Lake /ˈtætlə/ is a small unincorporated community in the west Chilcotin area of British Columbia, Canada, located at the west end of its eponymous lake. It is situated 220 km west of Williams Lake along Highway 20 (Chilcotin Highway) with the coastal community of Bella Coola to the west. The community is the service centre and main access point for the three major mountain valleys of West Branch, Chilko and Tatlayoko. These valleys extend southward via secondary roads.

== Lake ==
Tatla Lake
- Location within British Columbia
- Location: British Columbia
- Coordinates: 51°58′35″N 124°25′00″W
- Primary inflows: Tatla Lake Creek
- Primary outflows: Tatla Lake Creek
- Catchment area: 690 km^{2} (270 sq mi)
- Basin countries: Canada
- Max. length: 26.5 km (16.5 mi)
- Max. width: 0.95 km (0.59 mi)
- Surface area: 18.16 km^{2} (7.01 sq mi)
- Average depth: 10.4 m (34 ft)
- Max. depth: 38.4 m (126 ft)
- Water volume: 0.189 cubic kilometres (0.045 mi^{3})
- Shore length^{1}: 56 km (35 mi)
- Surface elevation: 910 m (2,990 ft)
- Islands: One
- Settlements: Tatla Lake, British Columbia
- ^{1} Shore length is not a well-defined measure.

The body of water of the same name is a freshwater lake situated just east of the community. This is a long, narrow lake, known for kokanee salmon fishing.

== History ==
The first people to live in Tatla Lake were the Tsilhqot'in (Chilcotin) First Nations people. The ranching settlement was founded in 1902 by Irish settler Robert Graham, who after purchasing property from Benny Franklin in 1902, built a house and a general store. The house persists as the Graham Inn, and the community also conserves a motel, the general store, a medical clinic and a library.

The name is an anglicised version of "Tatl'ah", the Tsilhqot'in name for the lake, roughly translated as "lake bay" - referring to a shape at the west end of the lake.

An now-closed aerodrome, or airstrip, is located near the settlement.

== Geography ==
Tatla Lake is situated on the western edge of the Chilcotin Plateau, and some of the largest mountains in British Columbia are found to the west including Mount Waddington - the tallest mountain completely within British Columbia's border. The Coast Mountains block most of the moisture traveling off the Pacific Ocean leaving the entire Chilcotin region in a rain shadow. Tatla Lake is the westernmost location for many semi-arid plants like Prickly Pear Cactus and Rabbit Brush.

== Climate ==
Tatla Lake has a continental mediterranean climate (Köppen climate classification: Dsb), closely bordering on a subalpine mediterranean climate (Köppen climate classification: Dsc). The rain shadow effect means Tatla Lake is quite dry receiving about the same precipitation per year as Penticton. The dry air combined with relatively high elevation and clear skies mean the daily temperature extremes are rather wide. In September the temperature can be over 32 °C (90 °F) during the day and below freezing at night. On average the temperature fluctuates by about 17 °C (31 °F).

During the winter the Tatla Lake valley is much colder than the surrounding plateau and valleys as the cold air sinks creating strong temperature inversions. The nearby weather station at Puntzi recorded a low of -52.8 °C (-63 °F) on December 29, 1968. During the winters chinook winds blow up the coastal valleys, but often pass over Tatla Lake leaving the community in a deep freeze. This occurs because the Tatla Lake drainage system flows east, while the neighbouring valleys flow west through the Coast Mountains.

Climate data for Tatla Lake, BC (1971–2000 normals)
Month	Jan	Feb	Mar	Apr	May	Jun	Jul	Aug	Sep	Oct	Nov	Dec	Year
Record high °C (°F)	15.6 (60.1)	17.8 (64.0)	19.4 (66.9)	29.4 (84.9)	33.5 (92.3)	32.8 (91.0)	37.8 (100.0)	33.9 (93.0)	32.2 (90.0)	27.8 (82.0)	18.3 (64.9)	15.0 (59.0)	37.8 (100.0)
Mean daily maximum °C (°F)	−1.8 (28.8)	2.3 (36.1)	6.8 (44.2)	11.7 (53.1)	16.3 (61.3)	19.0 (66.2)	22.3 (72.1)	22.5 (72.5)	18.5 (65.3)	11.7 (53.1)	2.7 (36.9)	−1.5 (29.3)	10.9 (51.6)
Daily mean °C (°F)	−6.8 (19.8)	−3.4 (25.9)	0.5 (32.9)	4.5 (40.1)	8.5 (47.3)	11.3 (52.3)	13.8 (56.8)	13.8 (56.8)	10.1 (50.2)	5.0 (41.0)	−1.9 (28.6)	−6.3 (20.7)	4.1 (39.4)
Mean daily minimum °C (°F)	−11.7 (10.9)	−9.1 (15.6)	−5.8 (21.6)	−2.7 (27.1)	0.6 (33.1)	3.6 (38.5)	5.3 (41.5)	5.1 (41.2)	1.6 (34.9)	−1.7 (28.9)	−6.4 (20.5)	−11.1 (12.0)	−2.7 (27.1)
Record low °C (°F)	−43.3 (−45.9)	−37.2 (−35.0)	−32.8 (−27.0)	−21.1 (−6.0)	−10.0 (14.0)	−5.0 (23.0)	−3.0 (26.6)	−4.0 (24.8)	−9.5 (14.9)	−27.0 (−16.6)	−39.0 (−38.2)	−40.6 (−41.1)	−43.3 (−45.9)
Average precipitation mm (inches)	42.0 (1.65)	29.4 (1.16)	25.3 (1.00)	16.8 (0.66)	27.3 (1.07)	35.5 (1.40)	36.6 (1.44)	34.5 (1.36)	27.7 (1.09)	50.0 (1.97)	59.1 (2.33)	50.0 (1.97)	434.1 (17.09)
Average snowfall cm (inches)	25.8 (10.2)	18.4 (7.2)	13.1 (5.2)	5.6 (2.2)	1.1 (0.4)	0.0 (0.0)	0.0 (0.0)	0.0 (0.0)	0.5 (0.2)	3.5 (1.4)	26.0 (10.2)	27.8 (10.9)	121.9 (48.0)

== See also ==
- Tatla Lake
- Chilanko Forks
- List of lakes of British Columbia
