= Razorback Mountain (British Columbia) =

Mountain in Cariboo Regional District, British Columbia, Canada

- Location within British Columbia

Highest point
- Elevation: 3,183 m (10,443 ft)
- Prominence: 2,153 m (7,064 ft)
- Listing: Mountains of British Columbia; North America prominent peak 75th; Canada highest major peaks 59th; Canada prominent peaks 29th
- Coordinates: 51°35′24″N 124°41′30″W

Geography
- Location: British Columbia, Canada
- District: Range 2 Coast Land District
- Parent range: Niut Range, Coast Mountains
- Topo map: NTS 92N10 Razorback Mountain

Climbing
- First ascent: 1932 by Henry S. Hall and Hans Fuhrer

Razorback Mountain is a mountain located within British Columbia, Canada. It is the highest peak of the Niut Range, a subrange of the Coast Mountains. Razorback Mountain has an elevation of 3,183 metres (10,443 ft), and with a prominence measure of 2,153 metres (7,064 ft), it is the 20th most prominent peak in British Columbia.

Razorback Mountain was first climbed in August 1932 by Henry S. Hall and Hans Fuhrer.

== See also ==
- List of Ultras of North America
- Mountain peaks of Canada
- List of the most prominent summits of North America
- Highest mountain peaks of Canada
