= Great Canyon (Homathko River) =

Steep-sided canyon carved by the Homathko River in British Columbia, Canada

Coordinates: 51°20′00″N 124°49′00″W

Great Canyon is the official name of a stretch of the Homathko River as it pierces the heart of the Pacific Ranges of the Coast Mountains between the Chilcotin District of the British Columbia Interior and the Central Coast region at Bute Inlet. Also known unofficially as the Grand Canyon of the Homathko, it is located above the confluence of Mosley Creek. The canyon is the largest on the Homathko and lies on the west side of the Waddington Range massif containing Mount Waddington, the range's highest, and like other parts of the Homathko has been proposed as the site of dams in a region-wide hydroelectric development involving the Homathko, Southgate, Chilko and Taseko Rivers.

== See also ==
- Waddington Canyon
- Chilcotin War
- Grand Canyon (disambiguation)
