= Hans Fuhrer =

Mountain Guide (1888-1958)

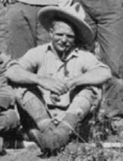
- Hans Fuhrer in 1933
- Born: 1888; Innertkirchen, Switzerland
- Died: 1958 (aged 69–70); Oregon
- Occupation: Mountain Guide

Hans Fuhrer (1888-1958) was a mountain guide born near Innertkirchen in Switzerland.

He made numerous first ascents in North America over a twenty year period, particularly in the Canadian Rockies. Those included both the first ascent of previously unclimbed peaks and the first ascent of several notable new climbs, including the Fuhrer Ridge on Mount Robson. In 1927 he and Alfred Ostheimer climbed 36 peaks in 63 days in the area around the Columbia and Clemenceau Icefields, 27 of those were first ascents.

== Guiding ==
Fuhrer's father and grandfather were alpine guides in Switzerland and he was introduced to guiding by them. He and his brother Heinrich (or Heinie) moved to the United States in 1912 to work as mountain guides. They initially started working in Oregon and between 1915-1918 he led more than a hundred ascents of Mount Hood.

In 1919 he joined the staff of the Rainier National Park Company, his brother joined him the following year. Over the next five years they both completed more than 150 ascents of Mount Rainier, guiding over 3,500 people to the summit. In addition to multiple ascent of the mountain by the regular routes, in 1920 he and his brother guided on what were to be the first new routes pioneered up Rainier for over fifteen years. One of those, with Roger W. Toll in late June 1920, was at the time believed to be the first ascent of the Kautz Glacier route. (Note: In 1968 it was suggested that this route had seen an earlier ascent) A week later the Fuhrers made the first recorded ascent via the Nisqually Glacier with Joseph Taylor Hazard, above the glacier the route followed a snow couloir which is now known as the Fuhrer Finger in recognition of the Fuhrer brothers. Hans Fuhrer also guided another first ascent of the mountain when he ascended the Puyallup Cleaver and Tahoma Glacier with Alfred E. Roovers in July 1934.

In the late 19th century and early 20th century the Canadian Pacific Railway (CPR) had employed European mountain guides in order to promote use of the railway for tourism and climbing in the Rocky Mountains. Those guides had included Peter Kaufmann and his two half-brothers Christian and Hans, and the Feuz family. In 1925 the Canadian National Railway (CNR) adopted a similar strategy and in 1926 Hans Fuhrer began working in Jasper National Park for the CNR. He was later joined by Heinrich. (Note: In 1925, the guide for a Japanese party who made the first ascent of Mount Alberta was Heinrich Fuhrer, it has been written that "Heinrich Fuhrer, the guide who led the first ascent of Mount Alberta, appears to have come to Canada specifically for this climb. He is not to be confused with another Heinrich Fuhrer, the brother of Hans Fuhrer, who guided in the Jasper area only a few years later".) Hans worked for the CNR until 1932 and then guided independently for several years. One of his regular clients in the 1930s was Henry Hall. Together they were involved in several attempts on Mount Waddington and they made first ascents of several lesser peaks together.

Amongst Fuhrer's other notable first ascents after he left the CNR were Mount Steele, 5,073 metres (16,644 ft), in the Saint Elias Range, the fifth-highest mountain in Canada, (their ascent in 1935 was the "last major successful ascent in the St Elias Mountains that did not employ the assistance of an airplane") and the Fuhrer Arête (or Fuhrer Ridge) on the NW side of Mount Robson in July 1938. Sixty years later it was written that "During the 1920s and '30s three climbs were made in the Canadian Rockies that clearly stand out as being ahead of their time", the first ascent of The Fuhrer Arête by William R. Hainsworth and Howard Carlson, guided by Hans Fuhrer was one of the three.

== Later years ==
In later life Fuhrer returned from Canada to US and he retired to Oregon where he died in 1958. Forty years after his death it was written that Fuhrer was "one of the greatest mountain guides of the era."
