= Alfred Waddington =

Canadian politician

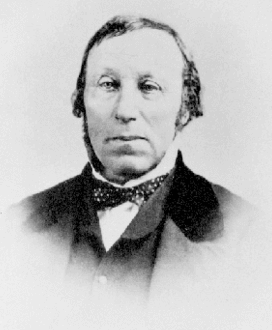
- Born: October 2, 1801; Brompton, London, England
- Died: February 26, 1872 (aged 70); Ottawa, Ontario, Canada
- Education: University of Göttingen
- Occupations: Politician, author, businessman

Alfred Penderell Waddington (October 2, 1801 – February 26, 1872), during his later years, was actively involved in the Colony of Vancouver Island in what later became the province of British Columbia, Canada.

From 1860 to 1861 he was a representative of the Victoria District in the House of Assembly of the Colony of Vancouver Island. He was also the first colonial Superintendent of Education from 1865 to 1867 and was an advocate of free public education.

Waddington is also remembered for planning the ill-fated Waddington's Road at Bute Inlet. The road was intended to be a shorter route to the Cariboo Gold Rush goldfields and was intended to run from the Pacific Coast via Bute Inlet to Fort Alexandria, but instead resulted in the Chilcotin War.

== Early years ==
Alfred Waddington completed his early education in England, attended a school in Paris and then attended the University of Göttingen in Germany.

In 1850, he moved to California and joined a partnership of wholesale grocers.

In 1858, Waddington moved north to Victoria, British Columbia. Although the Fraser Canyon Gold Rush was in full swing, Waddington was not interested in gold seeking. Instead, he wanted to encourage settlement in the colony and wrote Fraser Mines Vindicated, the first book ever published in the Colony of Vancouver Island that was not from a government source.

In 1860, he was elected to the House of Assembly on a platform of religious equality, women's rights and small government.

In 1861, he resigned from the House and in 1862, he helped draft the charter of the City of Victoria, but declined a nomination to be its first mayor.

== Waddington's Road ==
In 1862, Waddington began lobbying the press and his political allies for support for a wagon road from Bute Inlet to Fort Alexandria where it would connect to the Cariboo Road and continue on to the goldfields at Barkerville. He received approval for the construction early in 1863.

In spring 1864, when members of the Tsilhqot'in (Chilcotin) First Nations learned of the plans to build the road through the Homathko River Valley, they feared both infringement on their territory and the increased threat of smallpox, which had already killed many of their people during the 1862 Pacific Northwest smallpox epidemic. Eight Tsilhqot'in men, led by Klatsassin, attacked one of Waddington's work camps, killing fourteen road construction workers.

Waddington's Road was never completed because of the war, but was examined in later years as one of the main possible routings for the mainline of the Canadian Pacific Railway. However, the railway chose Burrard Inlet, which as a result became today's Vancouver.

== Superintendent of education ==
In 1865, Alfred Waddington was appointed Superintendent of Education for the colony Vancouver Island, but when the Island was annexed into British Columbia in 1866, the Board of Education no longer had any authority. He also served two terms as a member of the Vancouver Island Assembly.

Waddington resigned in 1867 and the rest of the Board decided to close all of the schools on Vancouver Island. By 1868, all of the board members had resigned to protest against the new government's attitudes towards free public schools.

Meanwhile, Waddington had never forgotten his Bute Inlet route and began campaigning (against Walter Moberly) for a transcontinental railway to be built along that route, selling his rights to the federal government in 1871. He was in Ottawa lobbying for this very purpose when he died of smallpox on February 26, 1872.

== Places named after Alfred Waddington ==
- Mount Waddington
  - Waddington Range (named after Mount Waddington)
  - Mount Waddington Regional District (named after Mount Waddington)
- Waddington Canyon, on the Homathko River below Mosley Creek
- Waddington Drive in Kamloops
- Waddington Alley in Victoria
- Waddington Crescent in Nanaimo
- Waddington Channel, divides East and West Redonda Islands
- Waddington Harbour, at the mouth of the Homathko River, which was the basecamp for the road-building party, also known as Port Waddington

== See also ==
- Professor Charles Waddington, nephew of Alfred Waddington
- Senator Richard Waddington, nephew of Alfred Waddington
- William Henry Waddington, Prime Minister of France, French Ambassador to the United Kingdom and nephew of Alfred Waddington
