= Southgate River =

River in British Columbia, Canada

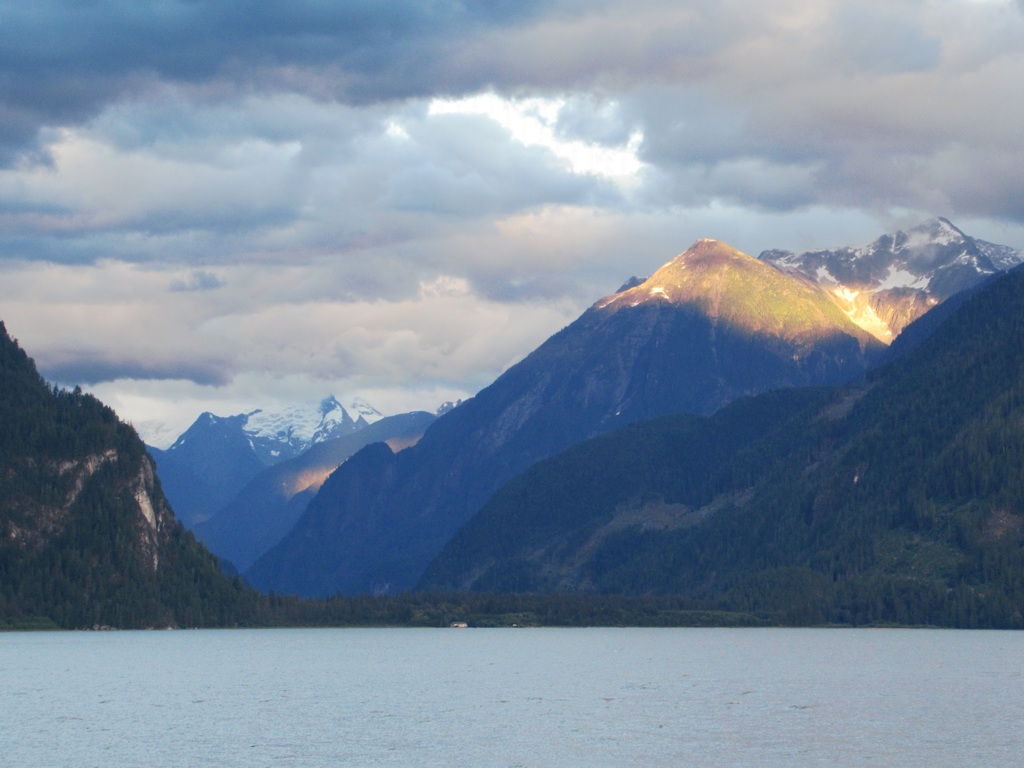
- Pigeon Valley, through which the Southgate River flows, as viewed from Bute Inlet

- Location of mouth in British Columbia

Physical characteristics
- Source: Good Hope Mountain
  - location: Strathcona Regional District, British Columbia, Canada
- Mouth: Bute Inlet
  - location: Strathcona Regional District, British Columbia, Canada
  - coordinates: 50°53′11″N 124°47′16″W
- Length: 65 km (40 mi)

Basin features
- Tributaries
  - right: Bishop River

The Southgate River is a river in the Pacific Ranges of the Coast Mountains in British Columbia, Canada, entering the head of Bute Inlet, on that province's South Coast, just east of the mouth of the Homathko River at Waddington Harbour. The lower reaches of the river's course are flat-bottomed and are named Pigeon Valley.

== Name origin ==
Its namesake was Captain James Johnson Southgate, a retired ship-master, who came to Victoria in 1859 via San Francisco and launched a commission and general mercantile business, largely in connection with the Pacific Station of the Royal Navy at Esquimalt, operating as J.J. Southgate & Co. He sold the business and returned to England in 1865, but during his time in Victoria, he served as a member of the Legislative Assembly of Vancouver Island from 1860 to 1863, as the member for Saltspring Island. He died in London in 1894. The Southgate Group of islands are also named for him as is Southgate Island within that group. The Southgate Glacier at the river's head, and Southgate Peak, which stands above its mouth, were named in association with the river.

== Hydrology ==
The river is approximately 65 kilometres (40 mi) in length, beginning on the western flank of Good Hope Mountain, to the east of the Homathko Icefield, and then flows generally south-southwest for about 40 kilometres (25 mi) before turning west-northwest toward the head of Bute Inlet. The Bishop River enters it from the east after the first 20 kilometres (12.4 mi) of its course and has its origin at Ring Pass, which lies between the Compton Neve to the west and the Lillooet Icecap to the east and forms the divide with the uppermost Lillooet River.

Other major tributaries include Boulanger Creek, Elliot Creek, Icewall Creek, and Malim Creek.

== History ==
The indigenous Homalco people have inhabited the watershed of the Southgate River since time immemorial.

=== 2020 Elliot Creek Megatsunami ===
On 28 November 2020, unseasonably heavy rainfall triggered a landslide of 18,000,000 m^{3} (24,000,000 cu yd) into a glacial lake at the head of Elliot Creek. The sudden displacement of water generated a 100 m (330 ft) high megatsunami that cascaded down Elliot Creek and the Southgate River to the head of Bute Inlet, covering a total distance of over 60 km (37 mi). The event generated a magnitude 5.0 earthquake and destroyed over 8.5 km (5.3 mi) of salmon habitat along Elliot Creek.

== See also ==
- Bishop River Provincial Park
- Homathko Estuary Provincial Park
- List of rivers of British Columbia
