= Homathko Icefield =

Icefield in British Columbia, Canada

Coordinates: 51°07′N 124°35′W

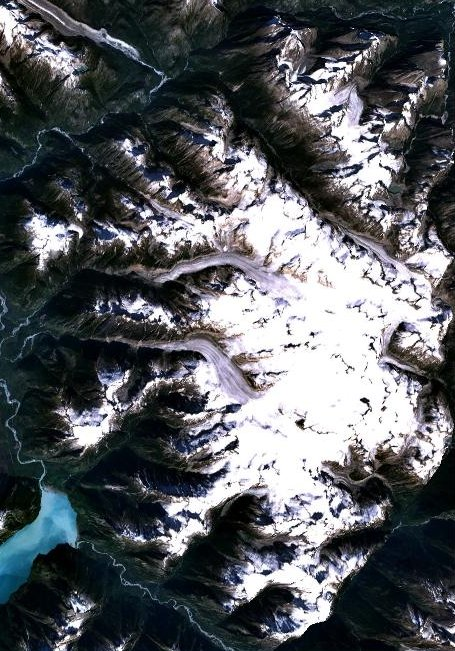
Satellite image of the Homathko Icefield

The Homathko Icefield is an icefield in British Columbia, Canada. Officially named the Homathko Snowfield from 1950 until the current name was adopted in 1976, it is one of the largest icefields in the southern half of the Coast Mountains, with an area of over 2,000 km^{2} (770 sq mi). It is located between Chilko Lake and the Homathko River, and lies across the Great Canyon of that river to the east of the Waddington Range.

Although adjacent to Mount Queen Bess, the Homathko Icefield is largely an expanse of ice, about 30 km (19 mi) across, ringed by relatively minor peaks and distinguished, relative to the other Coast Mountains icefields, by lack of any major ones. The Lillooet Icecap and the Compton Névé, both similar in size to the Homathko Icefield but much more peak-studded, lie to the Homathko Icefield's southeast across the Southgate River, which bends around the icefield-massif's southern flank to reach the head of Bute Inlet adjacent to the mouth of the Homathko River. The icefield is essentially one large ice-girt montane plateau between these two rivers.

== Summits ==
The highest summit of the icefield is Mount Grenville, located at its southern edge. Among its other peaks are Plateau Peak, Cambridge Peak, Cloister Peak, Galleon Peak and, on its northwest overlooking the site of the opening battle of the Chilcotin War, Klattasine Peak, named for the Tsilhqot'in leader of the war. Just northeast of the icefield is Mount Queen Bess, the second-highest summit in the Pacific Ranges, and to the icefield's east is Mount Good Hope; near it, and within the icefield, are peaks whose names continue the Elizabethan theme - Burghley Peak, Howard Peak, and Walsingham Peak, named after soldiers and statesmen of that era.

== Etymology ==
Homathko is a derivation of Homalco or Homalhco or Homalhko, who are a subgroup of the Mainland Comox, whose territory includes Bute and Toba Inlets.

== See also ==
- List of glaciers
- Pacific Ranges
- Lillooet Icecap
- Ha-Iltzuk Icefield
