= Homathko River =

River in British Columbia, Canada

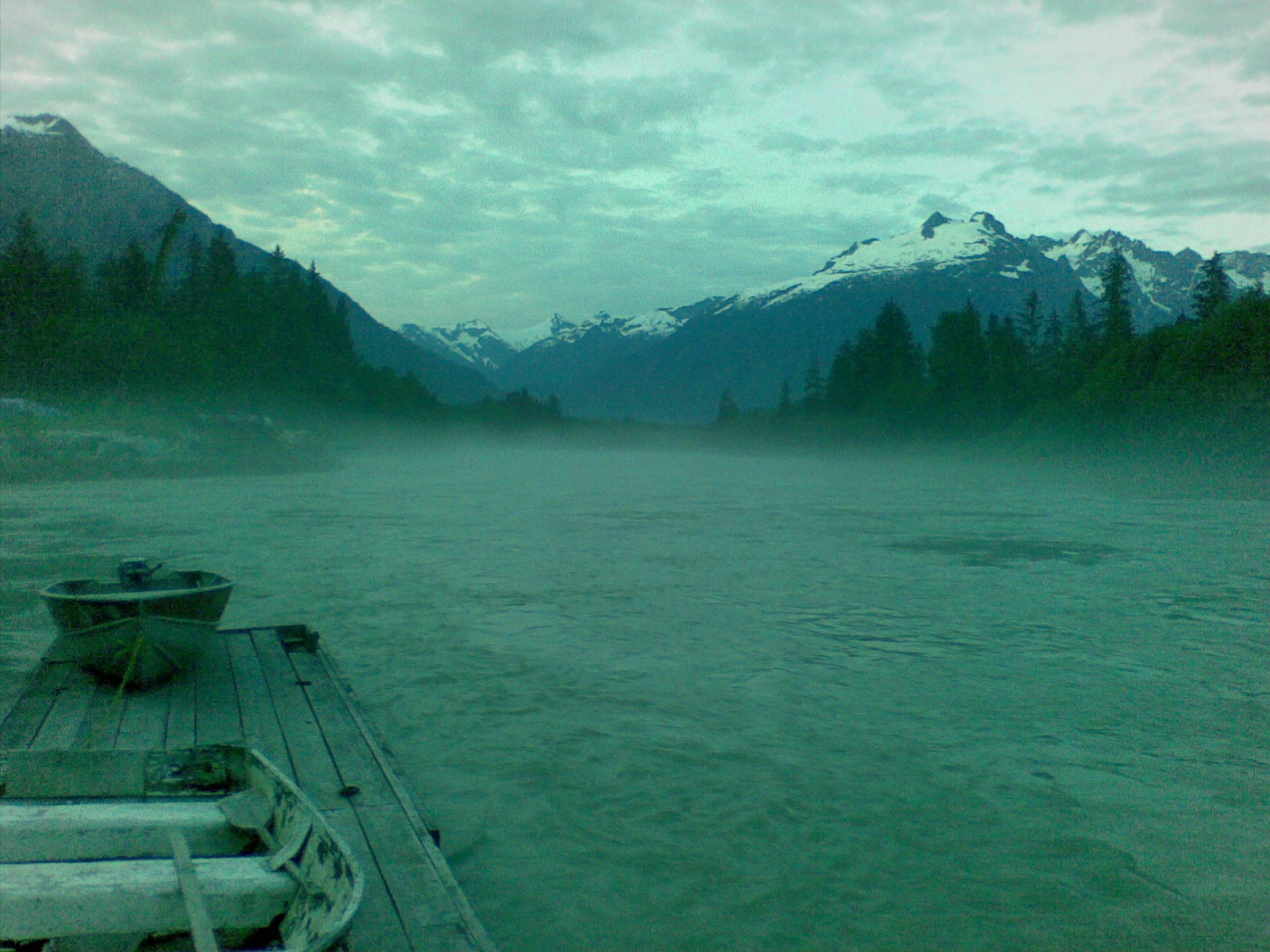
- Early morning on the Homathko

- Mouth of Homathko River
- Etymology: From a Mainland Comox word meaning "swift water"
- Native name: χomaɬkʷu (Comox); ʔElhtinqox (Chilcotin)

Location
- Country: Canada
- Province: British Columbia

Physical characteristics
- Source: Unnamed lake
  - location: Coast Mountains
  - coordinates: 51°42′39″N 124°36′15″W
  - elevation: 2,126 m (6,975 ft)
- Mouth: Pacific Ocean
  - location: Bute Inlet, Coast Mountains
  - coordinates: 50°55′52″N 124°51′37″W
  - elevation: 0 m (0 ft)
- Length: 144 km (89 mi)
- Basin size: 5,680 km^{2} (2,190 sq mi)
- Discharge
  - location: mouth
  - average: 269 m^{3}/s (9,500 cu ft/s)
  - minimum: 30.0 m^{3}/s (1,060 cu ft/s)
  - maximum: 3,140 m^{3}/s (111,000 cu ft/s)

The Homathko River is one of the major rivers of the southern Coast Mountains of the Canadian province of British Columbia. It is one of the few rivers that penetrates the range from the interior Chilcotin Country to the coastal inlets of the Pacific Ocean, rising near Tatla Lake, and reaching the sea at the head of Bute Inlet, just west of the mouth of the Southgate River.

The Homathko River Valley is one of the most difficult rivers in British Columbia to navigate or explore. Because of the frigid waters, the valley being lined with devil's club and being home to many grizzly bears.

== Geography ==
The mountains flanking the Homathko River are the highest in the Coast Mountains, and include Mount Waddington west of the river in the Waddington Range and Mount Queen Bess east of the river, adjacent to the Homathko Icefield. Also flanking the Homathko River on the west are the Niut Range, which is in the angle of the Homathko and its main west fork, Mosley Creek, and the Whitemantle Range, which is to the south of the Waddington Range massif, forming the mountainous ridge dividing Bute and Knight Inlets. The Pantheon Range lies west of Mosley Creek and the Niut Range and adjoins the Waddington Range immediately on the north.

The Homathko's drainage basin is 5,680 square kilometres (2,190 sq mi) in size.

== Course ==
The Homathko begins at an unnamed lake in the northern part of the Niut Range. It flows northeast to the Chilcotin Plateau, skirting it briefly near Tatla Lake, then turns south to Tatlayoko Lake, which is just west of Chilko Lake, part of the Chilcotin River basin.

From there the Homathko River flows south and west, piercing the Pacific Ranges. It is joined by numerous tributaries, including the north-flowing Nostetuko and the Stonsayako Rivers. Downriver, the Homathko is joined by Mosley Creek, which flows south from the Pantheon Range.

As the river cuts through the Waddington Range it flows through Waddington Canyon. It empties into Waddington Harbour, the head of Bute Inlet.

Several Homalco (or Homalko) Indian reserves are located at the river's mouth.

== History ==
Bute Inlet and the lower reaches of its major rivers, such as the Homathko and Southgate, were and are home to the Xwe’malhkwu, or Homalco First Nation people. The Xwe’malhkwu are part of the K'omoks, or Comox people, and speak a dialect of the Mainland Comox language, part of the Coast Salish branch of the Salishan language family. Colonial influence eroded Xwe’malhkwu culture in the late 19th century. Indian Residential schools further destroyed traditional Xwe’malhkwu culture and language.

The upper part of the Homathko River basin was home to the Tsilhqot'in (Chilcotin) people. Although there was occasional trade between the Tsilhqot'in and Xwe’malhkwu, generally the two peoples were antagonistic and sometimes violent.

The Xwe’malhkwu and Tsilhqot'in never ceded their lands. Both are currently in the process of treaty negotiations with British Columbia and Canada. Both claim aboriginal title to parts of the Homathko River's watershed.

In 1861 Alfred Waddington of Victoria sent surveyors to the Homathko River and Bute Inlet, seeking to build Waddington's Road, to compete with the proposed Cariboo Road. Both roads were a reaction to the Cariboo Gold Rush and intended to provide access to the remote Cariboo region. In 1864, just below the confluence of Mosley Creek and the Homathko River, a conflict between Waddington's survey party and a group of Tsilhqot'in (Chilcotin) resulted in the death of fourteen members of the surveying party.

This was the opening round of the Chilcotin War of 1864. The land-surveyed townsite of Port Waddington on today's maps is a relic of those times. The townsite had been surveyed as part of roadbuilder Alfred Waddington's obligations in having the licence to build the road, as well as profit from the sale of lots (and some lots were sold, but the townsite never came to anything).

In 1871 the Crown Colony of British Columbia joined the Canadian Confederation with certain conditions, one of which was the construction of a transcontinental railroad to link the seaboard of British Columbia with the rest of Canada. The Canadian Pacific Railway began to survey the several proposed routes. One such route crossed the Chilcotin Plateau then followed the Homathko River to Bute Inlet and continued across Sonora Island and Quadra Island (then thought to be a single island known as Valdes Island) to reach Vancouver Island via Seymour Narrows. This route would then follow the eastern coast of Vancouver Island to terminate near Victoria.

After years of political wrangling Burrard Inlet was chosen for the railway's terminus-port city, thereby creating the City of Vancouver. The proposed Homathko River route was abandoned.

In 1890 a new surveying expedition set out to explore the Homathko River route to the Chilcotin Plateau. Despite memory of the Chilcotin War and fear of the Tsilhqot'in, and although the terrain was challenging in places, the party reached Tatla Lake in the Chilcotin Country without undue incident.

== Wildlife ==
The Homathko River is a major producer of Chum and Pink salmon. Other fish include Coho and Chinook salmon, Rainbow and Steelhead trout, Cutthroat trout, Bull trout, and Dolly Varden trout.

In 2008 nine Grizzly Bear Wildlife Habitat Areas were designated in the Homathko watershed.

== Hydroelectric proposals ==
There have been various plans to develop the Homathko and its neighbouring rivers for hydroelectric power. The Homathko alone has immense hydroelectric potential. Full build-out as first conceived would divert the Taseko Lakes and Chilko Lake into the Homathko system via Tatlayoko Lake. A series of dams on the Homathko and its tributaries, using the extra power of the water from the Chilcotin's tributaries, would have generated some of the most power per project in British Columbia.

The creation of Tsʼilʔos Provincial Park (the 'ʔ' represents a glottal stop) and Big Creek Provincial Park have shelved the grand plan, as Chilko and Taseko Lakes are protected and cannot be diverted (also for salmon fishery reasons). But the dams proposed for the Homathko Canyon are still on the books. If ever built, the largest dam and powerhouse will stand at a point in Waddington Canyon that is marked on the map as "Murderer's Bar"—no less than the spot on which the Chilcotin War began.

== Protected areas ==
Protected areas within the Homathko River's watershed include Homathko Estuary Provincial Park and Homathko River-Tatlayoko Protected Area.

== Tributaries ==
This is an incomplete list of tributaries listed in upstream order.

- Cumsack Creek
- Heakamie River
- Jewakwa River
- Brew Creek
- Whitemantle Creek
- Scar Creek
- Klattasine Creek
- Tiedemann Creek
- Mosley Creek
  - Tellot Creek
  - Mercator Creek
  - Scimitar Creek
  - Five Finger Creek
  - Crazy Creek
  - Twist Creek
  - Hell Raving Creek
  - Middle Lake
  - Razor Creek
  - Valleau Creek
  - Bluff Lake
  - Sapeye Lake
- Nude Creek
- Ottarasko Creek
- Tatlayoko Lake
- Lincoln Creek
- Skinner Creek
- Cochin Creek
- Quakie Creek

== See also ==
- List of rivers of British Columbia
- Great Canyon (Homathko River)
