= Bute Inlet =

Fjord in British Columbia, Canada

- French: Baie Bute
- tɛqʷaχən (Comox); ʔElhtinqox Tachi (Chilcotin)
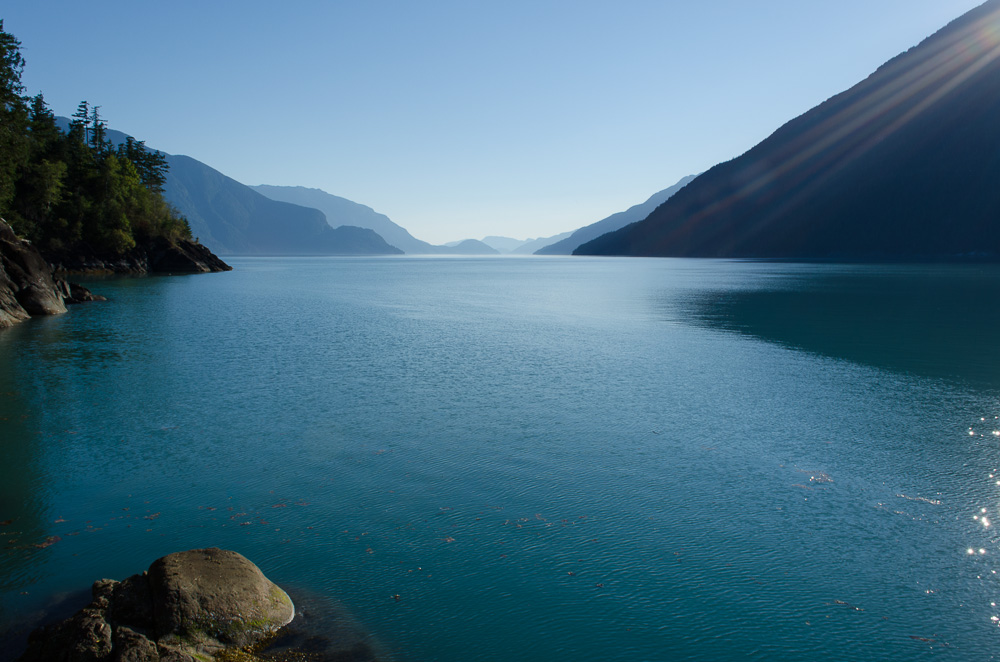

- Location within British Columbia
- Location: Strathcona RD, British Columbia
- Coordinates: 50°39′09″N 124°53′10″W
- Primary inflows: Homathko River, Southgate River
- Primary outflows: Cordero Channel (west); Calm Channel (south)
- Max. length: 80 kilometres (50 mi)

Bute Inlet is one of the principal inlets of the British Columbia Coast. It is 80 km (50 mi) long from the estuaries of the Homathko and Southgate Rivers at the head of the inlet, to the mouth, where it is nearly blocked by Stuart Island, and it averages about 4 km (2.5 mi) in width. Bute Inlet is in a spectacular wilderness setting and is one of the most scenic waterways in the world. In the upper reaches of the inlet mountains rise 2,700 m (9,000 ft) feet above sea level. Bute Inlet is a spectacular wilderness that is visited by very few people. In more recent years tourists are travelling from around the world to view grizzly bears in a natural setting and explore the wilderness of Bute Inlet.

== Name origin ==
Bute Inlet took its name from John Stuart, 3rd Earl of Bute who was Prime Minister of Great Britain from 1762 to 1763. His grandson Charles Stuart was a master's mate on Vancouver's Discovery.

== History ==
=== Waddington's Road and the Chilcotin War of 1864 ===
Bute Inlet had an interesting role in the early history of the Colony of British Columbia. Entrepreneur Alfred Waddington sought to build a route to the Cariboo goldfields that was shorter and easier than the existing routes via the Fraser Canyon and the Douglas Road. In competition with the projected Cariboo Road, still under construction at that time, Waddington got a license from the colonial government to undertake the construction of a wagon road from the head of Bute Inlet via the Homathko River to the Chilcotin Plateau, thence east across the Fraser to the Cariboo goldfields. The plan was that steamers from Victoria would voyage to the head of the inlet, and travellers would take what was to be a toll road overland from there. He was granted a townsite at the head of the inlet (still on maps as Port Waddington but as nothing more than a land survey) and commenced construction up the Grand Canyon of the Homathko from there.

Conflict with warriors of the Tsilhqot'in Nation quickly ensued when Waddington's foreman threatened smallpox on the warriors, who had been working as labourers due to famine in their country, which is over the mountains on the inland side of the range. Discussing his threats that night, the warriors, led by Klattasine of the Xeni Gwet'in of Nemaia Valley near Chilko Lake, rose up and slaughtered Waddington's work party. Three men escaped despite severe injuries. As a result of their reports, expeditions were launched by troops from Victoria and a posse of volunteers from the Cariboo and a long bait-and-wait game ensued known to history as the Chilcotin War of 1864. It ended with the surrender on terms of amnesty by Klattasine, who was betrayed and hanged at Quesnellemouthe (near modern-day Quesnel).

=== Proposed Canadian Pacific Railway route ===
The Bute Inlet route was later considered for the mainline of the Canadian Pacific Railway (CPR), which would have seen extensive blasting down the west shore of the inlet and a series of bridges to reach Vancouver Island near Campbell River via Seymour Narrows. This route was passed over in favour of the Fraser Canyon route to a new port-city at Burrard Inlet, which was to become the city of Port Moody. The residual political impact of the Chilcotin War was one factor dissuading the CPR from using Bute Inlet; the other was the severe grades required in the canyon of the Homathko River in order to reach the elevation of the Chilcotin Plateau on the inland side of the Coast Range, as well as the cost of blasting along the inlet and the deep water bridges needed below it.

=== 2020 Elliot Creek megatsunami ===
On 28 November 2020, unseasonably heavy rainfall triggered an 18,000,000 m^{3} (24,000,000 cu yd) landslide into a glacial lake at the head of Elliot Creek, generating a magnitude 5.0 earthquake and a 100 m (330 ft) high megatsunami that rushed down Elliot Creek and the Southgate River to the head of Bute Inlet, covering a total distance of over 60 km (37 mi) and destroying over 8.5 km (5.3 mi) of salmon habitat along Elliot Creek.

== Political geography ==
Bute Inlet extends north from Stuart Island

Bute Inlet is located in the Coast Land District, Range 1 and is part of the Sunshine Coast Forest District of the Coast Forest Region, which is headquartered in Powell River, and the Lower Mainland Ministry of Environment Region, headquartered in Surrey. It is also within the mainland portion of the Strathcona Regional District, which has only municipal powers such as sewage and building permits on non-Indian reserve lands in rural areas. The inlet lies in the overlapping traditional territories and land claims of the Homalco, Klahoose, Kwiakah and We Wai Kai First Nations.

== Geology ==
Bute Inlet in British Columbia is a classic fjord formation formed during the Holocene by glacial erosion. Bute Inlet is one of the deepest fjords in British Columbia with its depth of 660 m (2,170 ft), with a sill of 220 m (720 ft). The majority of freshwater entering the inlet, ~95%, is supplied by the Homathko River and the Southgate River at the head of the fjord. An underwater channel system is incised in the fjord basin sediments which carries sediment to the fjord.

== See also ==
- Homathko Estuary Provincial Park
