= Chapmans, British Columbia =

Chapmans
- Location of Chapmans in British Columbia
- Coordinates: 49°42′59″N 121°25′04″W
- Country: Canada
- Province: British Columbia
- Region: Fraser Canyon
- Regional District: Fraser Valley
- Time zone: UTC−07:00 (PT)
- Area codes: 250, 778, 236, & 672
- Highways: Highway 1

Chapmans is a locality in the lower Fraser Canyon area of southwestern British Columbia. The place is on the east shore of the Fraser River and north of Alexandra Bridge Park. The locality, on BC Highway 1, is by road about 46 kilometres (29 mi) north of Hope and 64 kilometres (40 mi) south of Lytton.

== First Nations and interactions ==
The Nlaka'pamux and Sto:lo First Nations have inhabited the area for about 10,000 years. During a mapping expedition, Alexander Caulfield Anderson visited the indigenous village of Ke-que-loose in 1847. The Tikwalus Heritage Trail, beginning at this point, was used by the Nlaka’pamux for thousands of years and was part of the Hudson's Bay Brigade Trail for 11 years.

In the 1870s, 59 indigenous people lived in the vicinity.

== Name origin ==
In 1858, during the Fraser Canyon Gold Rush, dozens placer mined the bar, which was one of the largest and richest on the east side of the river. Chapman was likely the prospector who discovered this find. One speculation is that Chapman ran a nearby roadhouse at the time.

== Ferries and roads ==
In the early 1860s, a reaction ferry operated at Chapmans Bar. However, this may well have been the rope ferry close to the planned bridge site.

In 1862, Joseph Trutch completed the Chapmans Bar–Boston Bar leg of the Cariboo Road along the east shore. The tender contract mentioned a road toll to recover the construction costs.

During construction in the early 1880s, the Canadian Pacific Railway (CP) installed ferries at Chapmans Bar and Camp 13, which was just south of Hells Gate.

In 1964, lighting was installed within the Alexandra Tunnel on the highway north of Chapmans. Completed that year, the tunnel is about 290 metres (950 ft) long. The cyclist-activated warning lights, which currently require the pressing of a button, may be upgraded to a camera detection system.

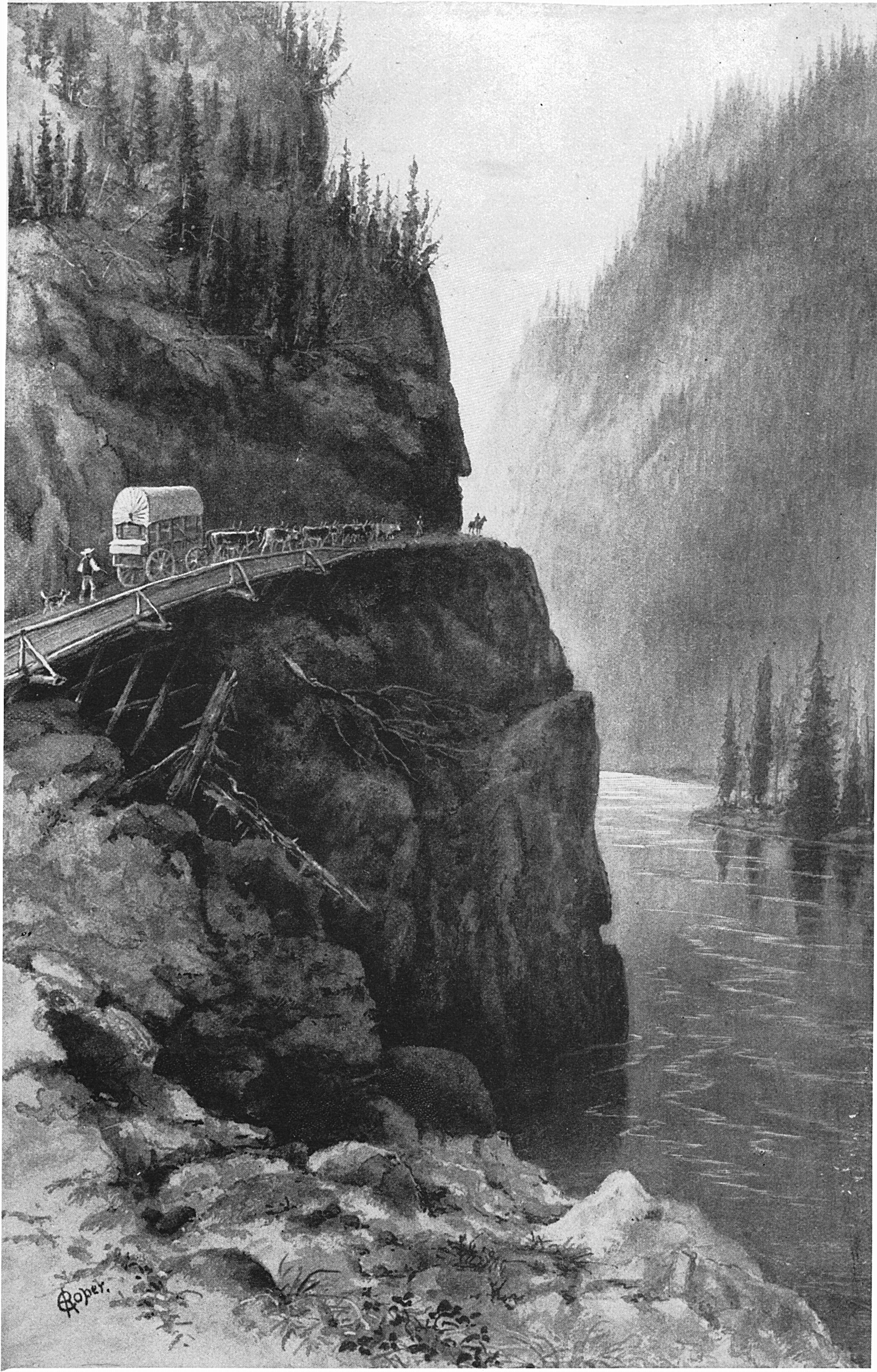
Southward view, Chapmans Bluff, Fraser Canyon, 1890

The steamboat Skuzzy was launched in 1882 near the CP Big Tunnel (west shore opposite the Alexandra Tunnel). An earlier account mentions the boat building over the previous winter near Chapmans Bar. Although the specific side of the river is unclear, the general location was not far north of Chapmans.

== General community ==
In 1858, to serve the river trail, William L. Alexander established a restaurant and store in a small log building. In early 1859, Walter Moberly stayed the night in the partly constructed log cabin. At daybreak, a pig ran off with one of his boots, which he was unable to retrieve.

In 1864, Louis Waigland, who had purchased 13 hectares (32 acres), built in partnership with Alexander a large, two-storey frame roadhouse. During railway construction in the 1910s, the Canadian Northern Railway (CNoR) expropriated much of the property and further damaged the remnants of the wagon road northward.

In earlier decades, the lodge was variously called Chapmans Bar House or Alexanders 14 Mile House.

The earliest newspaper reference to the name Alexandra Lodge for the accommodation was July 1927. The present lodge built about that time largely follows the architect's drawings. Differences might reflect early rebuilding as a result of a possible fire. During the 1920s to 1940s, the owners ran an upmarket establishment, for which a private hydro plant provided electricity. By the 1930s, several tourist cabins occupied the property, and a BA gas station stood north of the lodge. The weight of snow collapsed the roof of that building in the early 1990s and the ruins were burned down about 2000. The highways department moved the lodge back six feet from the road in 1952 and placed it upon a concrete foundation.

Believing the building included key elements of the 1864 structure, the province assigned a heritage designation in the early 1970s, which was withdrawn a decade later after clarifying its true date. Around 1995, the lodge finally closed to guests. Two small fenced cemeteries exist to the south, one with stone monuments, the other unusual iron crosses.

In 2021, Shirley and Ken MacKinnon bought the 5-hectare (12-acre) property and have begun restorations. Two cabins at the front of the property are salvageable but three at the back will need to be rebuilt. The underside of the 279-square-metre (3,000 ft^{2}) lodge is so rotted that the structure is no longer attached to the foundation.

== Railway ==
In late May 1913, the eastward advance of the CNoR rail head reached Chapmans.

The Chapmans passing track on the predominantly single-track subdivision was 0.7 kilometres (2,435 ft) in 1916, progressively extending to the current 1.8 kilometres (6,040 ft) at Komo, a railway point 4 kilometres (2.5 mi) north, which was established around 1960.

The station was likely removed in the early 1980s.

CN and Official Guide Train Timetables (Regular stop or Flag stop)
	Mile	1916	1923	1927	1933	1938	1943	1947	1950	1956	1960
Boston Bar	2797.0	Regular	Regular	Regular	Regular	Regular	Regular	Regular	Regular	Regular	Regular
Gorge (Hell's Gate)	2804.4			Regular			Flag		Flag	Flag	
Chapman's	2809.7	Regular	Regular	Regular			Flag		Flag	Flag	
Stout	2815.3	Regular	Regular	Regular			Flag		Flag	Flag	
Yale	2823.7	Regular	Regular	Regular			Flag		Flag	Flag	

== Maps ==
- Lower Fraser Canyon maps 1832–1867.
- "Standard Oil BC map". www.davidrumsey.com. 1937.
