= Alexandra Bridge (Trans-Canada) =

Bridge on Highway 1 in southwestern British Columbia

- Coordinates: 49°42′04″N 121°24′36″W
- Carries: 2 lanes of Highway 1
- Crosses: Fraser River
- Locale: Chapmans; Spuzzum
- Owner: British Columbia Ministry of Transportation and Infrastructure
- Preceded by: Second Alexandra Bridge

Characteristics
- Design: arch bridge
- Material: Steel
- Total length: 487 metres (1,598 ft)
- Width: 12.2 metres (40 ft)
- Longest span: 257 metres (843 ft)

History
- Opened: 24 October 1962

The Alexandra Bridge is a steel arch bridge across the Fraser River in the lower Fraser Canyon area of southwestern British Columbia, Canada. The two-lane crossing, carrying BC Highway 1, is by road about 44 kilometres (27 mi) north of Hope and 66 kilometres (41 mi) south of Lytton.

== Former ferries and bridges ==
Several ferries and the first and second Alexandra Bridges have existed in the vicinity.

== Bridge construction and opening ==
In 1958, General Construction Co was awarded the bridge substructure ($589,167), but unexpected ground conditions temporarily halted the work, while minor changes were made in the foundations design. The next year, A.I.M. Steel was awarded the steel superstructure ($2,262,283).

In May 1962, the steelwork was complete. At the time, the second longest bridge of this type in the world, the bridge remains the longest one in the Fraser Canyon. For the final phase, Narod Construction was awarded the deck and fence contract ($109,684).

The 487-metre (1,598 ft) length comprises a 257-metre (843 ft) arch span and steel girder approach spans with concrete decks. Northeast to southwest, the bridge crosses the Canadian National Railway (CN), Fraser River, and Canadian Pacific Railway (CP).

In October 1962, Highways Minister Phil Gaglardi officially opened the $4 million high level bridge. The increased gross load allowance to 34,473 kilograms (76,000 lb) and trailer lengths to 18 metres (60 ft) for the highway permitted heavy trucks to use this more direct route rather than the circuitous Hope–Princeton.

== Bridge operation ==
In May 1963, Phil Gaglardi returned for the unveiling of four aluminum fish sculptures, two at each end of the bridge. Standing at the southwest end, a cairn commemorates the contribution of the Royal Engineers in building the Cariboo Road.

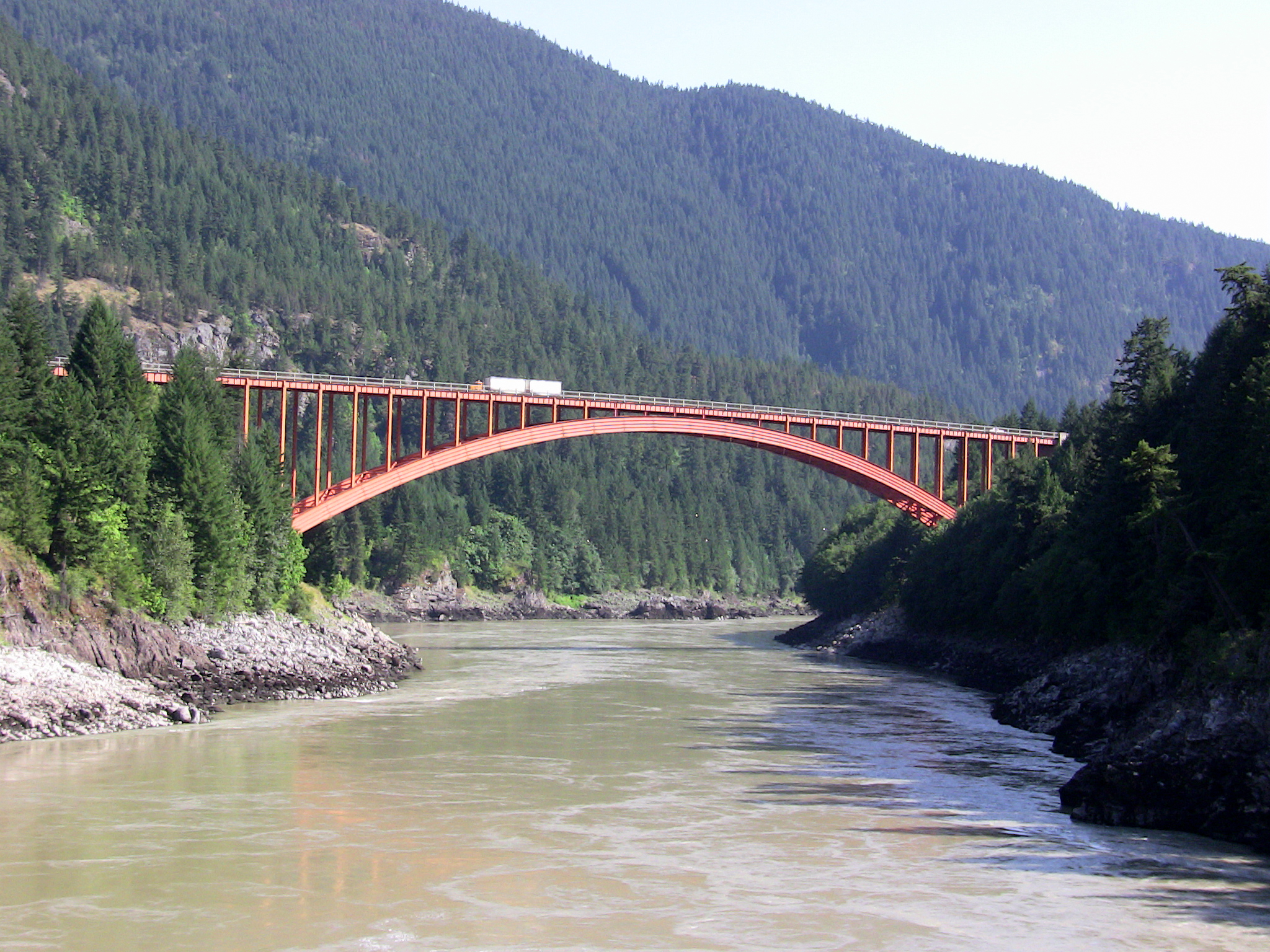
Third Alexandra Bridge, 2008

The completion of phase 2 of the Coquihalla Highway project (Merritt–Kamloops) in September 1987 created a faster route to the interior, greatly reducing the Fraser Canyon and Alexandra Bridge traffic.

A 2009 report determined the bridge needed major deck rehabilitation and a seismic retrofit. During 2015–2018, Surespan Construction carried out the $22.2 million project. The concrete deck was rehabilitated and extended to 12.2 metres (40 ft), providing wider shoulders with railings upgraded to current standards. Link slabs were installed. Expansion joints and bearings were replaced. Partial painting and sundry repairs were completed. The discovery of some cases of extensive corrosion prompted a second phase of the project, which was undertaken in 2019.

== See also ==
- List of crossings of the Fraser River
- List of bridges in British Columbia
- Royal eponyms in Canada
