= Skuzzy =

Skuzzy may refer to:

- Skuzzy (sternwheeler)
- SCSI (Small Computer Systems Interface), pronounced Skuzzy
