= Spuzzum =

- Location of Spuzzum in British Columbia
- Coordinates: 49°41′19″N 121°24′49″W
- Country: Canada
- Province: British Columbia
- Region: Fraser Canyon
- Regional District: Fraser Valley
- Time zone: UTC−07:00 (PT)
- Area codes: 250, 778, 236, & 672
- Highways: Highway 1

Spuzzum is an unincorporated community in the lower Fraser Canyon area of southwestern British Columbia, Canada. The place is on the west shore of the Fraser River and north shore of Spuzzum Creek. The locality, on BC Highway 1, is by road about 40 kilometres (25 mi) north of Hope and 69 kilometres (43 mi) south of Lytton.

== First Nations and interactions ==
First Nations have inhabited the canyon for thousands of years. When Simon Fraser stayed overnight in June 1808, he was perceived as a supernatural being. Fraser noted blankets made from the wool of mountain goats and dog's hair and burial boxes set on posts. At the time, the two villages of Spuzzum and Schwimp of the Nlaka'pamux peoples existed but later possessed the collective name of Spuzzum, meaning "little flat". The boundary between the Upper Sto:lo (Tait) and the Nlaka'pamux peoples was at Sawmill Creek, about 9 kilometres (6 mi) south.

In mid-1858, the first miners passed through the area, which began the co-existence and intermarriages between the two cultures. That August, two miners were killed in an encounter with First Nations just below Spuzzum. In retribution, a party of about 40 from Yale travelled north as far as Boston Bar, killed several in battle, and burned their villages to the ground.

Historically, summer and winter dwellings, and fishing, hunting, and gathering locations, covered a wide area. From 1860, land was lost to trails, the Cariboo Road, bridges, railways, and pre-emptions by settlers. By 1863, pre-emptions had compressed the indigenous entitlement mostly to the south side of the creek. In the 1870s, 149 indigenous people lived south of the Alexandra suspension bridge and about 8 hectares (20 acres) was under cultivation, principally potato crops.

The Spuzzum First Nation is the name of the local band government. Downstream from the Alexandra bridges, the reserves from north to south are Skuet 6, Papsilqua 2B, Papsilqua 2, Papsilqua 2A, Spuzzum 1 (formerly Spuzzum Rancherie), Spuzzum 7, and Spuzzum 1A.

== Name origin ==
In 1848, the Hudson's Bay Company (HBC) built Simon's House as a store, where the fur brigades crossed the Fraser. During the Fraser Canyon Gold Rush a decade later, this name had been replaced by Spuzzum. However, Rancheria was also sometimes used.

Spuzzum Mountain to the northwest is part of the Lillooet Ranges subdivision of the Coast Mountains.

== Topography ==
The river is narrow and turbulent at Spuzzum. The large bar was worked by placer miners. The location lies in a constricted part of the Fraser Canyon north of the Yale highway tunnel; the area is dominated by granitic or gneissic bedrock.

South of the creek, the land adjacent to the river is low and marshy and subject to spring flooding. North of the creek is higher and flatter.

== Ferry, bridges, and roads ==
A rope guided the punt-shaped reaction ferry, which struggled to cope with the heavy and frequent wagon traffic during the goldrush. Part of the Old Mountain Trail from Yale, the ferry ran intermittently from 1848 for 10 years, then actively for five years before the first Alexandra suspension bridge opened in 1863 about 4 kilometres (2 mi) upstream. On one particular day, the 50 cents per passenger fare filled a tin bucket with silver and gold. When the ferry capsized on another occasion, all the passengers drowned. When later interviewed, the operator was asked if there was much loss. He replied, "Oh no, I always collect the fares in advance."

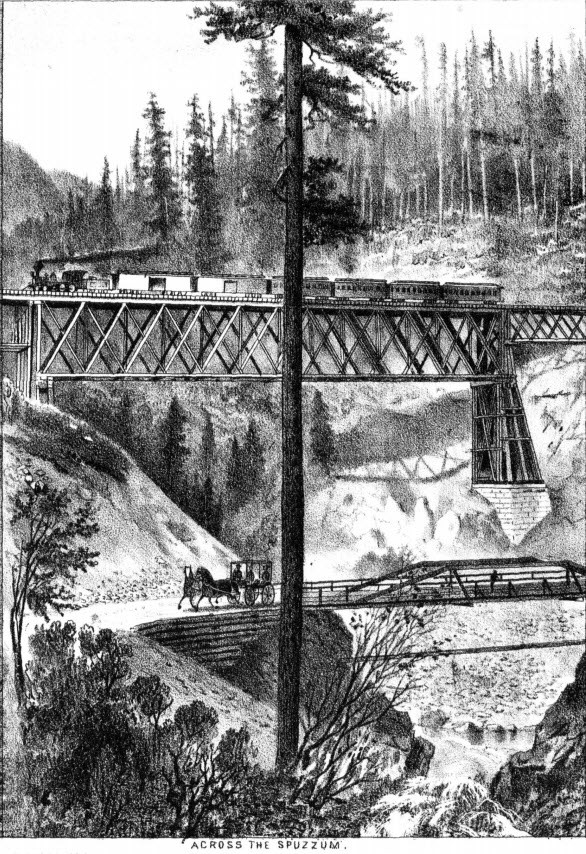
Spuzzum Creek rail and road bridges, 1883

In 1858, private enterprise erected a bridge over Spuzzum Creek, which was tolled for six months.

In 1862, the government awarded Joseph Trutch & Thomas Spence the southward leg of the new wagon road from the proposed bridge to Pike's Riffle along the west shore, for completion the following spring. The Royal Engineers supervised such work. The road width was 5 metres (17 ft) extended to 7 metres (22 ft) through tunnels and cuttings. When a stage plunged over a cliff below Spuzzum in March 1881, two horses died and two passengers suffered broken legs.

Although the Canadian Pacific Railway (CP) construction during the 1880s severely damaged the Yale–Spuzzum road, this section had become passable by the early 1900s. After the 1894 Fraser River flood had destroyed the Spuzzum Creek bridge, the 91-metre (300 ft) railway bridge became the only means of crossing the creek. A new bridge erected around 1900, which was again east of and lower than the railway bridge, had fallen into disrepair by 1920, when rehabilitated.

In 1924, W.P. Tierney was awarded the reconstruction of the Yale–Spuzzum leg of the road for completion during the following year. In 1947, this section was paved.

In 1956–57, contracts were awarded for the replacement of Spuzzum Creek bridge and associated roadwork, lying west of and higher than the railway bridge. In 1957–58, this work was completed. Once the new Alexandra Bridge opened in 1962, the highway bypassed Spuzzum at a higher elevation and the second Alexandra Bridge became redundant.

During a 2010 accident, two semi-trailers plunged from the Spuzzum Creek bridge, killing one of the drivers. In 2016, a jackknifed semi-trailer blocked the bridge for hours.

In May 2018, Greyhound Canada axed Fraser Canyon stops such as Spuzzum, leaving no bus service in the area.

== General community ==
During the goldrush, Frank May, the ferry operator, established a roadhouse close by, sometimes known as California House. Although a large, single-storey log structure, a bishop visiting in 1860 described it as a roadside hut, and a detached bakehouse, which could house an overflow of travellers.

Most of the settlers who outlasted the goldrush did not remain much longer. However, pre-emptions increased after each infrastructure development. Mark Francis Andrew, who pre-empted on the west shore of the ferry in 1862, was the hotel proprietor by 1866. Magistrate E.H. Sanders, whose duties included registering claims, pre-empted the adjacent land south to the creek.

A general store has existed at least since 1890. The post office operated 1897–1975. A school existed 1897–1906.

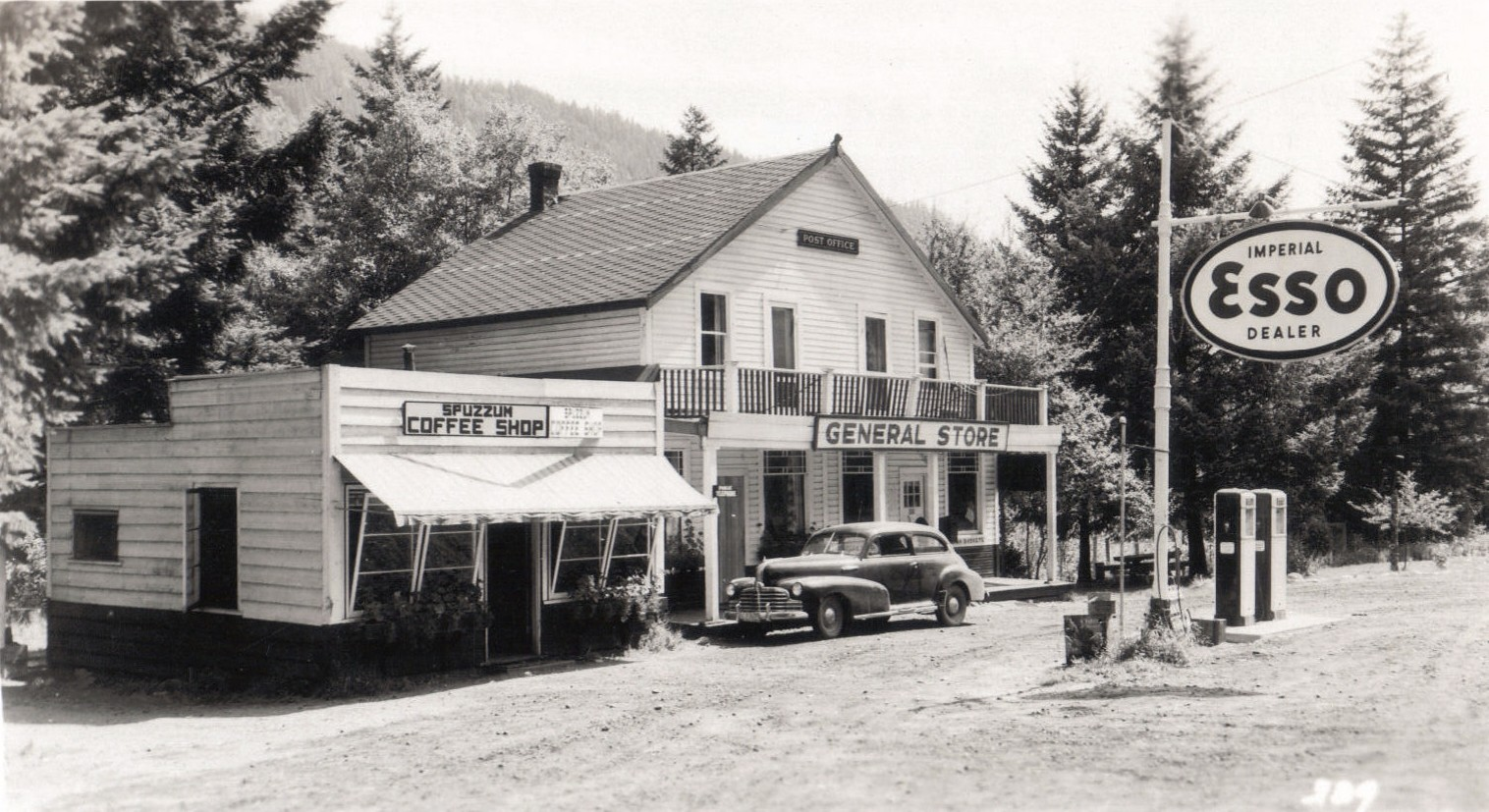
General store, café, and gas bar, Spuzzum, c.1952

During World War I, a military camp was constructed.

The former two-storey general store building on the east side of the railway track opened in the late-1920s. The gas bar installed later was Gulf, then BA, and finally Esso. The building has since become a residence. In 1923, a house was built at 38191 Front St with seven decent sized bedrooms to be used as a hotel when the new highway opened in 1926.

In the 1930s, a police detachment was established within the village. By 1941, two officers resided, possibly using the hotel building. In 1947, the police post moved to Boston Bar.

In the late 1940s, Japanese Canadians released from internment wholly occupied the hotel building. Employment opportunities diminished when the Neville Lumber sawmill closed around 1950 and only three Japanese families remained in the village. The building has reverted to a residence.

A one-room school, which operated 1945–1965, closed with only five students. The building has since become a residence.

In 1954, Joyce Gyoba of Spuzzum tied for the top score in the scholarship exam. On receiving her nursing degree in 1959, she was noted as the most outstanding student in her class.

In 1958, the general store/gas bar relocated to new premises on the present highway. The store closed and the building became the Sasquatch Dining Lounge in the mid-1970s.

In 1995, a used fire truck was purchased, but the scheme to form a fire brigade does not appear to have eventuated.

In 1996, the BC Hydro substation received a $10.3 million upgrade.

Better known as the Spuzzum Café, the diner was advertised for sale in April 1995, and from November 1997 to November 1998. The property, which burned to the ground in 2001, was the only remaining business in the community of 14 people.

== Colloquial references ==
The town is often referred to in humorous contexts owing to its small size. Examples are "Don't blink or you'll miss it", "beyond Hope", "If you ain't been to Spuzzum, you ain't been anywhere", and "Spuzzum Institute of Technology". At one-time, both sides of a highway sign read, "You are now leaving Spuzzum". Although the highway did not bypass the hamlet until 1962, the reputation as an object of mockery was widely understood at least a decade earlier.

== Railways ==
In June 1882, the northward advance of the CP rail head from Yale passed through Spuzzum to a temporary terminus at Alexandra Bridge. That August, a train fatally struck an individual on the track near Spuzzum.

In 1885, a member of the section crew was killed nearby when a locomotive struck their handcar.

In 1890, a freight train fatally injured an inebriated individual sleeping upon the track in the vicinity.

In 1892, a CP employee, thrown from and run over by a handcar nearby, was badly injured.

In 1895, after a dump car ran over a track worker, he died in hospital after a foot amputation.

In 1896, when an eastbound passenger train struck an intoxicated person in the tunnel, the injuries were fatal. Two months later, a collision between a freight train and a work train 6 kilometres (4 mi) south caused considerable damage to the rolling stock.

In 1898, a few miles south, a freighthopper fell between two cars and was decapitated.

While present at the extinguishing of a fire in the tunnel about 7 kilometres (4 mi) north of Spuzzum in 1901, Edmund Juchereau Duchesnay, the CP Assistant General Superintendent of the Pacific Division, was killed by a falling rock.

In 1909, two locomotive engineers died and about 30 on board sustained minor injuries when a westbound passenger train mounted a snowslide around 5.6 kilometres (3.5 mi) south of Spuzzum, derailed, and the two lead locomotives and four cars slid down an embankment to the river edge.

In May 1913, the eastward advance of the Canadian Northern Railway (CNoR) rail head reached the shore opposite Spuzzum.

In 1919, a roadmaster sustained a fatal skull fracture during a rockslide at the CP tunnel.

Built in 1884, the standard-design (Bohi's Type 5) single-storey station building with gable roof and dormers (identical to Keefers) was destroyed in 1964 by a landslide.

Train Timetables (Regular stop or Flag stop)
	Mile	1887	1891	1898	1905	1909	1912	1916	1919	1929	1932	1935	1939	1943	1948	1954	1960	1964	1965
Keefers	110.8	Regular	Regular	Regular	Regular	Flag	Flag	Flag	Flag	Flag	Both	Flag	Flag	Flag	Flag	Flag	Flag	Flag	
Chaumox	116.5					Flag	Flag	Flag	Flag	Flag	Flag	Flag	Flag	Flag	Flag	Flag			
North Bend	121.5	Regular	Regular	Regular	Regular	Regular	Regular	Regular	Regular	Regular	Regular	Regular	Regular	Regular	Regular	Regular	Regular	Regular	Regular
China Bar	6.1						Flag	Flag	Flag	Flag		Flag	Flag	Flag	Flag	Flag	Flag	Flag	
Spuzzum	15.5	Regular	Flag	Flag	Regular	Flag	Flag	Flag	Flag	Flag	Flag	Flag	Flag	Flag	Flag	Both	Flag	Flag	
Saddle Rock	20.1							Flag	Flag										
Yale	27.1	Regular	Regular	Regular	Regular	Regular	Both	Both	Both	Both	Both	Both	Both	Both	Both	Both	Flag	Flag	Flag
Choate	34.0						Flag	Flag	Flag	Flag	Flag	Flag	Flag	Flag	Flag	Flag			
Hope	40.1	Regular	Regular	Regular	Regular	Regular	Both												
Haig	40.1							Flag	Regular	Both	Flag	Both	Both	Regular	Regular	Regular		Flag	

In 1923, a CP freight train fatally struck a track watchman.

In 1930, an eastbound freight train ran over an eight-year-old boy, who died in hospital.

During a nearby 1932 CP derailment of 30 cars, one freighthopper died and two were seriously injured.

In 1942, a train struck a CP track watchman within a mile of Spuzzum causing fatal injuries. Six months later, when eight cars of an eastbound CP freight train derailed nearby, damage was minimal and nobody was injured.

In 1943, a CP train struck a man walking the track nearby, causing severe head and back injuries.

In 1951, three crew died in a CP freight train wreck in the vicinity.

In 1953, the 445-metre (1,459 ft) tunnel was being enlarged for higher loads.

In 1968, five cars of a 17-car freight train derailed one mile north.

In 1982, 15 cars of 56-car CP freight train derailed at Saddle Rock to the south.

In 2002, a man was hospitalized after being struck by a train while walking the track near the Saddle Rock Tunnel.

In 2016, a Canadian National Railways (CN) nine-car grain train derailed on the CP track about 6 kilometres (4 mi) south, sending several cars into the Fraser.

== Notable people ==
- Carle Hessay (1911–1978), painter, place of death.
- George Henry Tomlinson Jr. (1896–1963), politician, place of death.
- Annie York (1904–1991), custodian of First Nations traditions, resident.

== Maps ==
- Lower Fraser Canyon maps 1832–1867.
- "BC map". www.davidrumsey.com. 1925.
- "Shell BC map". www.davidrumsey.com. 1956.
