= Farwell Canyon =

Canyon on the Chilcotin River in British Columbia, Canada

Coordinates: 51°50′00″N 122°34′00″W

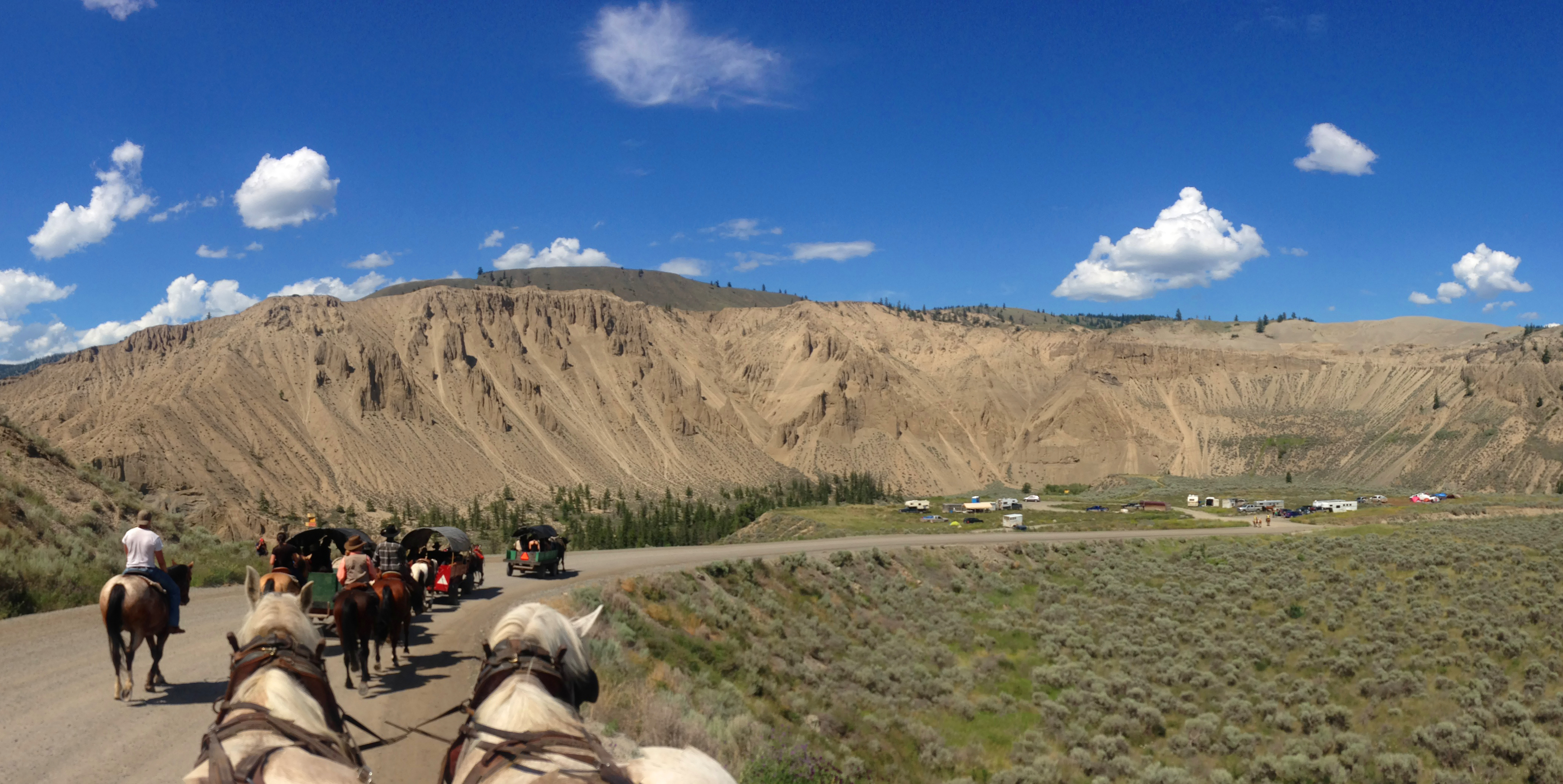
Nagwentled (Farwell Canyon)

Farwell Canyon (known to the local Tsilhqot'in First Nation as Nagwentled - 'place of landslides') is a canyon on the Chilcotin River in the Chilcotin District of British Columbia, Canada, located around the confluence of Farwell Creek and the Chilcotin, between the confluence of Big Creek and the Fraser River. This location has been significant to First Nations for countless generations as an important salmon fishing site. In the same area along the Chilcotin are the Farwell Rapids.

== See also ==
- Big Creek Canyon
