= Skuzzy (sternwheeler) =

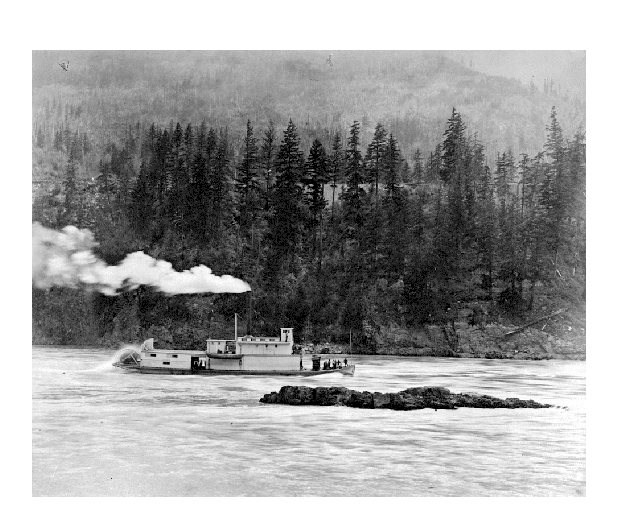
- The Skuzzy on the Fraser River near Yale, British Columbia, 1883.

History

Canada
- Name: Skuzzy
- Laid down: 1882 at Spuzzum
- Launched: May 4, 1882 at Spuzzum
- In service: May 4, 1882
- Out of service: circa. 1884
- Notes: Captain Ausbury Insley and SR Smith

Skuzzy was a sternwheeler built by Canadian Pacific Railway contractor Andrew Onderdonk at Spuzzum, British Columbia, Canada, and launched on the Fraser River on May 4, 1882. Skuzzy was the first sternwheeler to ever navigate the perilous rapids north of Yale in the Fraser Canyon.

== Service ==
Andrew Onderdonk held the contract to build the 29 1/2 miles (47.5 km) section of railway from Boston Bar to Lytton, worth $2,573,640. He built the Skuzzy with the intention of moving railway supplies by steamer to the camps north of Yale via the Fraser River instead of using pack trains over the Cariboo Road, which is a low but difficult pass between Yale and Spuzzum. A ship would save him $10 per ton in road tolls alone.

The Skuzzy was built to transport goods to the current places of construction of the Canadian Pacific Railway. Because transporting materials along the Cariboo Road took too long to reach the site, Andrew Onderdonk built the Skuzzy and used the Fraser River to his advantage. The "Skuzzy" would have to be piloted by an expert sailor as they would be navigating through the whirlpools and rapids of Hell's Gate.

After it was built, Ausbury Insley piloted the ship up river on May 17, 1882. Captain Insley was able to guide the Skuzzy upstream through the whirlpools and rapids and under the Alexandra Bridge which had been built by the Royal Engineers in 1863, but when Insley got the Skuzzy to the entrance of the Hell's Gate Canyon he could take it no further: the Fraser was at its highest point in forty years, and passage was impossible.

Onderdonk brought in a captain and engineer from Oregon. Under their command, on September 7, the Skuzzy again attempted the rapids at Hell's Gate and once again failed. Onderdonk then had ringbolts drilled into the canyon's walls, and he stationed 125 Chinese railway employees above. Observers were betting on the success of the journey, and odds were 100:1 against. Finally, with the aid of its steam capstan winching in the cable and 125 men pulling at its tow rope, the Skuzzy made it through Hell's Gate. It took 16 days to make the 16 mile trip to Boston Bar. The Skuzzy became the first sternwheeler to arrive in Lytton.
