= Bull Canyon Provincial Park =

Provincial park in British Columbia, Canada

- IUCN category II (national park)
- Location within British Columbia
- Interactive map of Bull Canyon Provincial Park
- Location: Cariboo Land District, British Columbia, Canada
- Nearest city: Alexis Creek, BC
- Coordinates: 52°05′29″N 123°22′44″W
- Area: 343 ha (850 acres)
- Established: April 30, 1996
- Governing body: BC Parks

Bull Canyon Provincial Park is a provincial park in British Columbia, Canada, protecting Bull Canyon on the Chilcotin River, which is 7 km (4 mi) below the confluence of the Chilko River with the Chilcotin. The canyon and park are located just west of the community of Alexis Creek. Bull Canyon is part of a large volcanic plateau called the Chilcotin Group.

The park is c.343 ha. in size and lies on the north side of the river.
