= Big Creek Canyon =

Coordinates: 51°51′00″N 122°41′00″W

Big Creek Canyon is a canyon on the Chilcotin River, located around the confluence of Big Creek in the Chilcotin District of British Columbia, Canada.

== See also ==
- Big Creek Provincial Park
- Lava Canyon
- Farwell Canyon
