= North Bend, British Columbia =

Coordinates: 49.883°N 121.467°W

North Bend
- Unincorporated place
- Interactive map of North Bend
- Country: Canada
- Province: British Columbia

Population (2016)
  - Total: 93
- Time zone: UTC−07:00 (PT)

North Bend is an unincorporated community in the Fraser Canyon region of British Columbia, Canada, located across the Fraser River from the town of Boston Bar. North Bend was originally known as Boston Bar, but that name moved across the Fraser River when the site was renamed North Bend.

== History ==
North Bend was founded during the construction of the Canadian Pacific Railway in the 1880s and was the site of various Canadian Pacific Railway company offices and housing. Equipped with a small railway hotel, Fraser Canyon House, aka the North Bend Hotel or the CPR Hotel, and another, larger hotel, the Mountain Hotel, and within a few hours' range of Vancouver by rail, the town prospered until the era of highway travel, when it became isolated. It was connected to Boston Bar and the Trans-Canada Highway for many years by the Boston Bar Ferry, an aerial cable ferry which has since been replaced by a bridge built to expedite logging operations on the east bank of the Fraser in that area. North Bend today is part of the general Boston Bar-area community and shares community services with it.

It was originally named Yankee Flats or Yankee Town.
