= Junction Sheep Range Provincial Park =

Provincial park in British Columbia

- IUCN category II (national park)
- Location within British Columbia
- Interactive map of Junction Sheep Range Provincial Park
- Location: Lillooet Land District, British Columbia, Canada
- Nearest city: 100 Mile House, BC
- Coordinates: 51°47′59″N 122°25′19″W
- Area: 4,774 ha (11,800 acres)
- Established: July 13, 1995
- Governing body: BC Parks

Junction Sheep Range Provincial Park is a provincial park in British Columbia, Canada, located near the confluence of the Chilcotin and Fraser Rivers on the west bank of the latter river.

== History ==
The Chilcotin Region began its history of agricultural settlements just as the Cariboo Gold Rush was waning in the 1860s. Two of the earliest ranches in this area were the Cotton and Deer Park Ranches, now amalgamated as Riske Creek Ranching. Settlement followed the accessible bunchgrass ranges along the terraces of the Chilcotin River between 1873 and 1893, and ranges have been used for livestock grazing since 1873. There is also historical evidence of mining in the area; remnants of old Chinese placer mining activities have been found at the confluence of the Fraser and Chilcotin Rivers. In 1973, a 4,573 hectare Wildlife Reserve, managed by the Fish and Wildlife Branch, was established to protect the bighorn sheep and their natural grassland habitat. This reserve was designated as the Junction Wildlife Management Area in 1987, and was designated a provincial park in 1995.

== Conservation ==
The area protects critical breeding, lambing, and winter range of the largest population of non-migratory California bighorn sheep in the world, a blue-listed species. Approximately 500 bighorn sheep live in the area, feeding on bunchgrass and other low growing plants, and finding refuge from predators in the steep breaks at the edges of grassland benches. In the past, the Junction California bighorn sheep have also provided a source of sheep for transplants to other areas of North America where the sheep had been extirpated.

== Recreation ==
The following recreational activities are available: horseback riding and hunting. There is no camping allowed within the park. The park is only open to the public during hunting season.

== Location ==
Located 60 kilometres south of Williams Lake, British Columbia. Access to the park is difficult, via rough 4 x 4 dirt roads through private ranchlands.

== Size ==
4,774 hectares in size.

== See also ==
- List of British Columbia Provincial Parks
- List of Canadian provincial parks
- Riske Creek, British Columbia
