= Big Creek (British Columbia) =

Location
- Country: Canada
- Province: British Columbia
- District: Lillooet Land District

Physical characteristics
- Source: Lorna Lake
  - location: Southeast of Mount Vic
  - coordinates: 51°07′40″N 123°09′49″W
  - elevation: 6,332 ft (1,930 m)
- Mouth: Chilcotin River
  - location: Big Creek Canyon
  - coordinates: 51°51′06″N 122°41′24″W
  - elevation: 1,657 ft (505 m)

Big Creek is a roughly 120-kilometre (75 mi) long tributary of British Columbia's Chilcotin River. Its surroundings are protected as the Big Creek Ecological Reserve.

Its source is remote Lorna Lake, located deep in the midst of the Chilcotin Ranges, near the vertex of the boundaries of Big Creek Provincial Park, the valley of the Taseko River and Taseko Lakes, which lies to its west, and the Spruce Lake Protected Area to its south (aka the "South Chilcotin" even though it is in the Bridge River Country, part of the Lillooet region). Near Lorna Lake is a location known as Graveyard Valley, believed to be the site of the final battle of a 19th-century war between the Tsilhqot'in and St'at'imc peoples over control of the upper basin of the Bridge River, which lies over the mountains to the south of Big Creek. The Big Creek basin is the easternmost of three southern tributary basins of the Chilcotin, the others to its west being the Taseko River basin and, west of it, the Chilko River basin. The largest stream to its east is Churn Creek, whose headwater creeks share a divide with the Big Creek basin, and which drains directly to the Fraser River.

Only the uppermost reaches of Big Creek are in mountain country, however. About 30 kilometres (19 mi) from its source the creek emerges onto the Chilcotin Plateau, which lines the lea of the Coast Mountains, and for most of its length it meanders across a mix of rangeland and subalpine forest and swamp.
