= Skoatl Point =

Volcanic plug in British Columbia, Canada

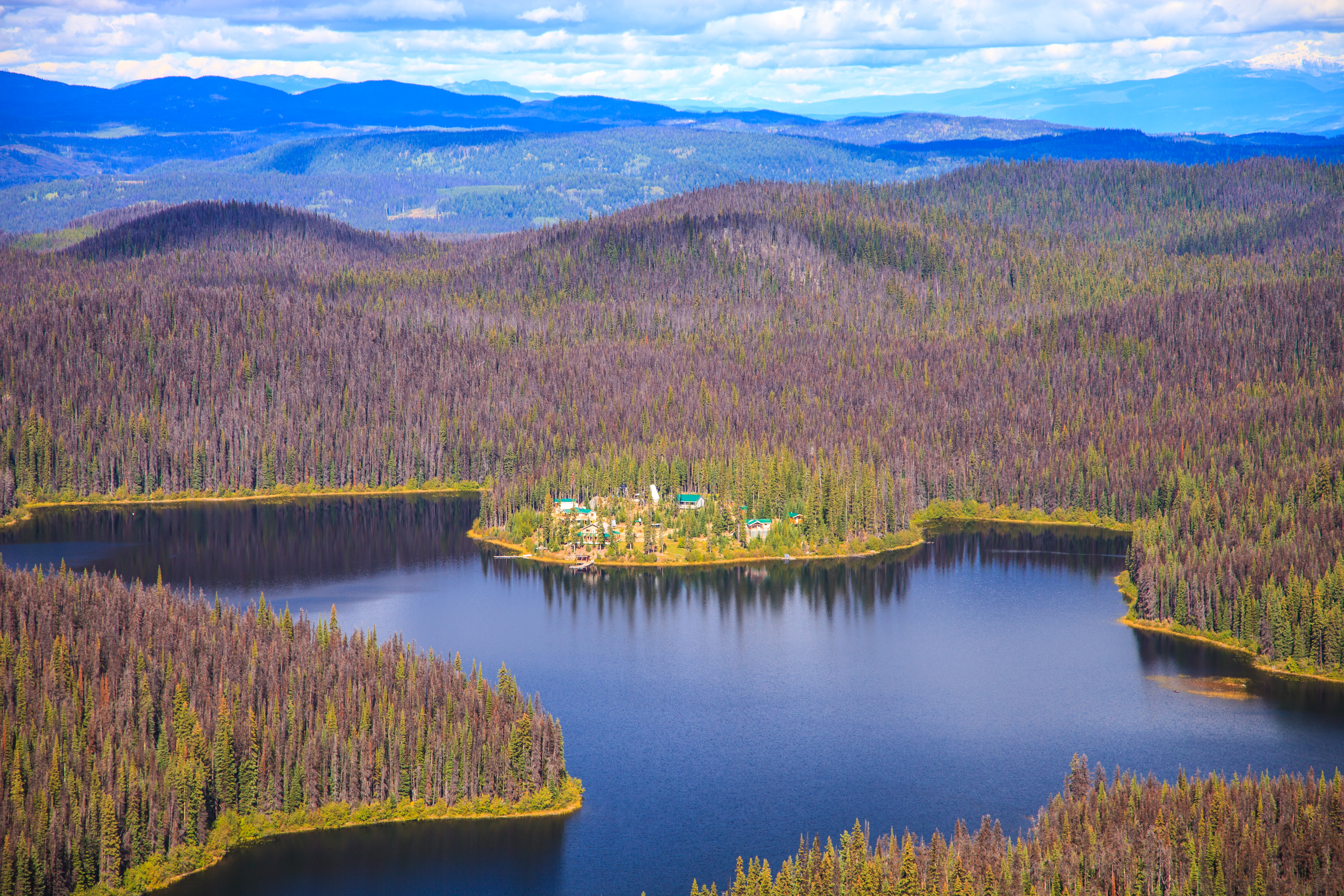
- Skoatl Point in 2011

Highest point
- Elevation: 1,640 m (5,380 ft)
- Prominence: 158 m (518 ft)
- Listing: List of volcanoes in Canada
- Coordinates: 51°09′15.8″N 120°25′50.2″W

Geography
- Location within British Columbia
- Interactive map of Skoatl Point
- Location: British Columbia, Canada
- District: Kamloops Division Yale Land District
- Parent range: Bonaparte Plateau, Thompson Plateau
- Topo map: NTS 92P1 Louis Creek

Geology
- Mountain type: Volcanic plug
- Volcanic zone: Chilcotin Group

Climbing
- Easiest route: Skoatl Point Trail

Skoatl Point is a volcanic plug located in the formation known as the Chilcotin Group, which lie between the Pacific Ranges of the Coast Mountains and the mid-Fraser River in British Columbia, Canada.

== See also ==
- List of volcanoes in Canada
- Volcanology of Canada
