= Lava Canyon =

Coordinates: 51°53′00″N 123°54′00″W

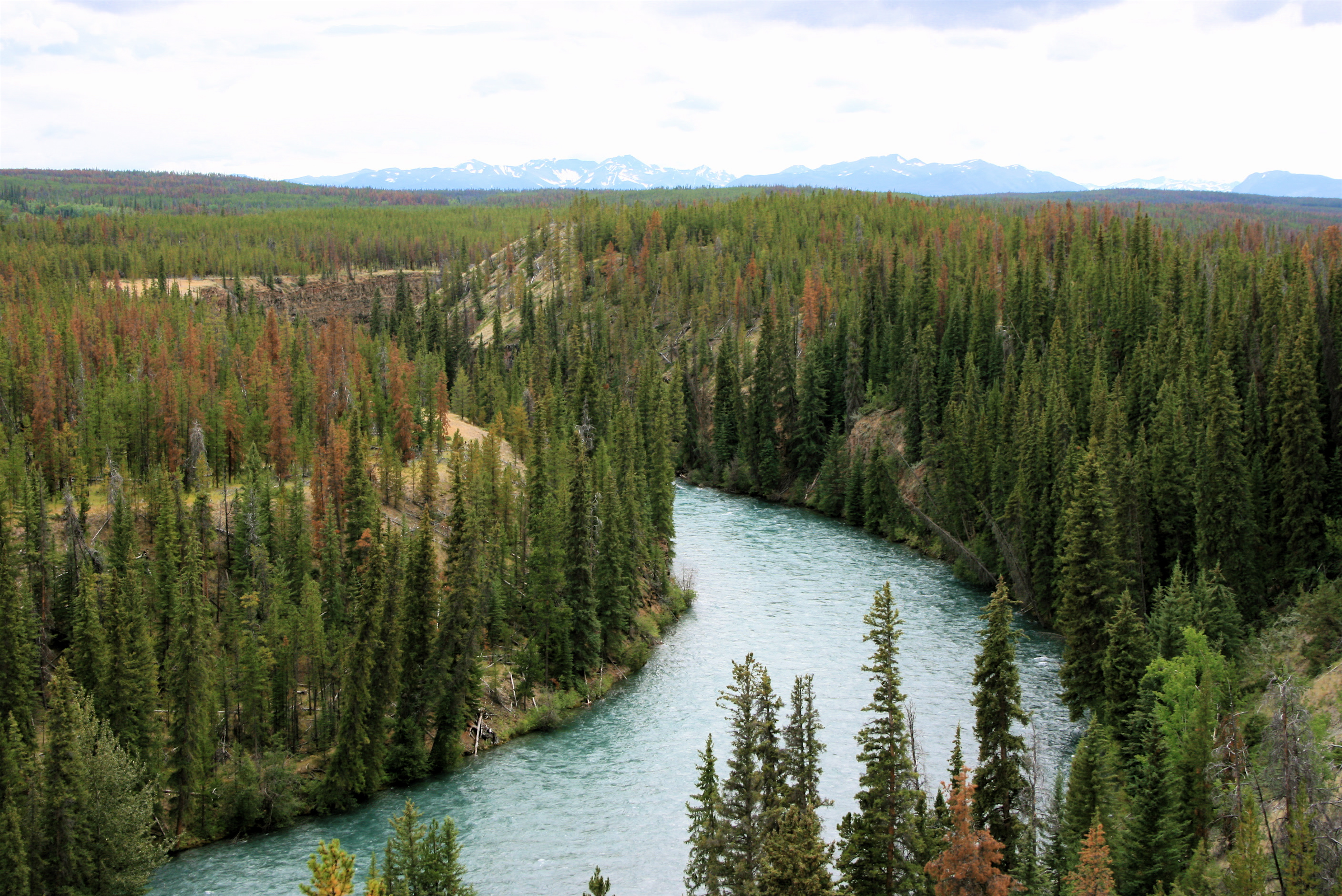
Chilko River and Lava Canyon

Lava Canyon is a canyon on the Chilko River in the Chilcotin District of the Interior of British Columbia, Canada, located about 35 kilometres below the Chilko's outflow from the foot of Chilko Lake.

Lava Canyon is named for the columnar basalt cliffs that form the canyon from former extensive volcanic activity of this region.

== See also ==
- Anahim Volcanic Belt
- Chilcotin Group
- Anahim hotspot
