= Chilcotin River =

River in southern British Columbia, Canada

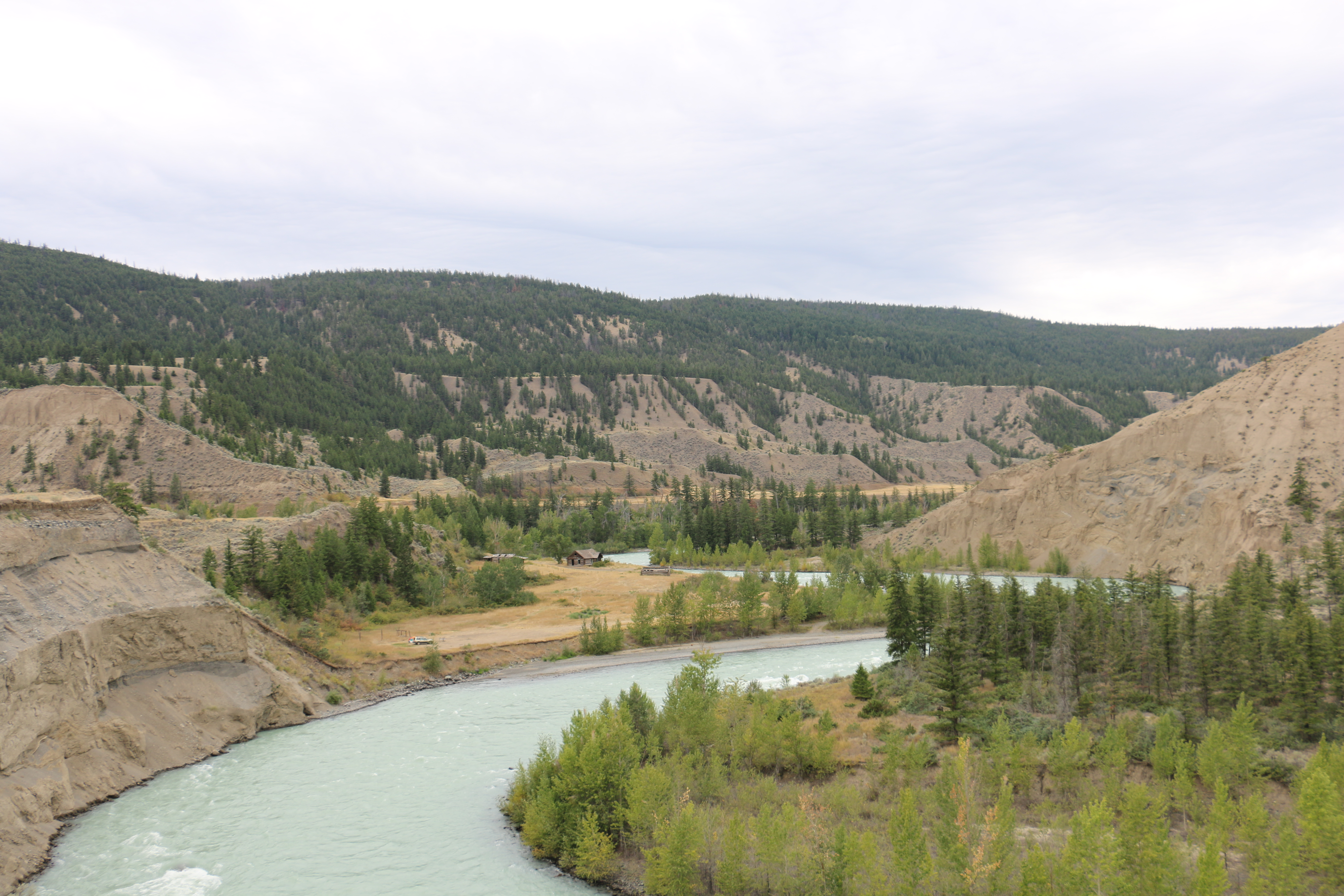
- Chilcotin in Farwell Canyon

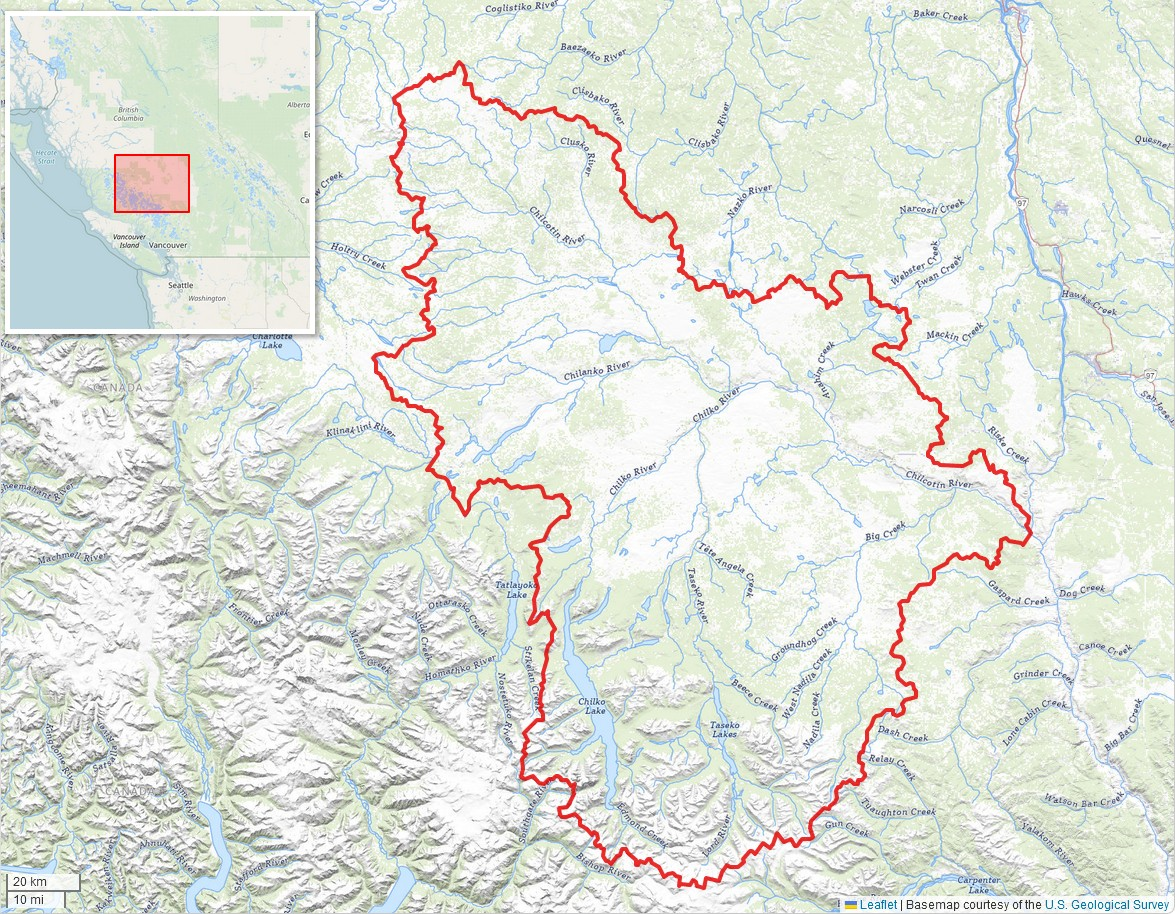
- Chilcotin River watershed (Interactive map)
- Native name: Cheẑqox (Chilcotin)

Location
- Country: Canada
- Province: British Columbia
- District: Lillooet Land District

Physical characteristics
- Source: Itcha Lake
  - location: Northeast of Itcha Mountain
  - coordinates: 52°47′09″N 124°45′51″W
  - elevation: 5,223 ft (1,592 m)
- Mouth: Fraser River
  - location: Upstream from Gang Ranch
  - coordinates: 51°44′22″N 122°24′03″W
  - elevation: 1,152 ft (351 m)
- Length: 241 km (150 mi)
- Basin size: 19,300 km^{2} (7,500 sq mi)
- Discharge
  - location: below Big Creek
  - average: 102 m^{3}/s (3,600 cu ft/s)
  - minimum: 13.8 m^{3}/s (490 cu ft/s)
  - maximum: 1,100 m^{3}/s (39,000 cu ft/s)

The Chilcotin River /tʃɪlˈkoʊtɪn/ located in Southern British Columbia, Canada is a 241 km (150 mi) long tributary of the Fraser River. The name Chilcotin comes from Tŝilhqot’in, meaning "ochre river people," where ochre refers to the mineral used by Tŝilhqot’in Nation and other Indigenous communities as a base for paint or dye. The Chilcotin River, Chilko River and Lake, and Taseko River and Lake make up the Chilcotin River watershed. This 19,200 km^{2} (7,400 sq mi) watershed drains the Chilcotin Plateau which reaches north to south from the Nechako Plateau to Bridge River county and east to west from Fraser River to the Coast Mountains. It is also one of twelve watersheds that make up the Fraser River Basin. Made up of seven major tributaries, Chilcotin River starts northeast of Itcha Mountain, flowing southeast until it joins the Fraser River south of Williams Lake, 22 km (14 mi) upstream from Gang Ranch.

The geological processes that created this region support its diverse history, climate, and ecology. This diversity is also illustrated by the presence of biogeoclimatic zones and a rich population of fish. Canadian Fisheries and many communities within the region such as: Alexis Creek, Hanceville, and the Tŝilhqot’in Nation depend on the diversity of Chilcotin River. In recent years, its diverse history, climate, and ecology has been impacted by a number of environmental concerns such as: increases in flooding, changes in water quality, declines in steelhead trout populations, and an increase in mountain pine beetle outbreaks.

== Natural landscape and climate ==
=== Geology ===
Rocks that form the valley walls suggest that the southward course of the Chilcotin River may have formed during the Late Miocene or Pliocene epochs. The lower reach of the Chilcotin River is home to the Wineglass assemblage and sedimentary rock which is enclosed by older rocks from the Cache Creek terrane. The assemblage is made up of Late Permian tonalitic rock cut through Late Permian volcanic rock. It is unique because its structure and composition correlates to other assemblages (Kutcho and Sitlika assemblages) across British Columbia. The assemblages share similar lithology, an unconformity overlain with sedimentary sequences from the Triassic-Jurassic Periods, and a structural relationship with the overlying Cache Creek Complex.

=== Course ===
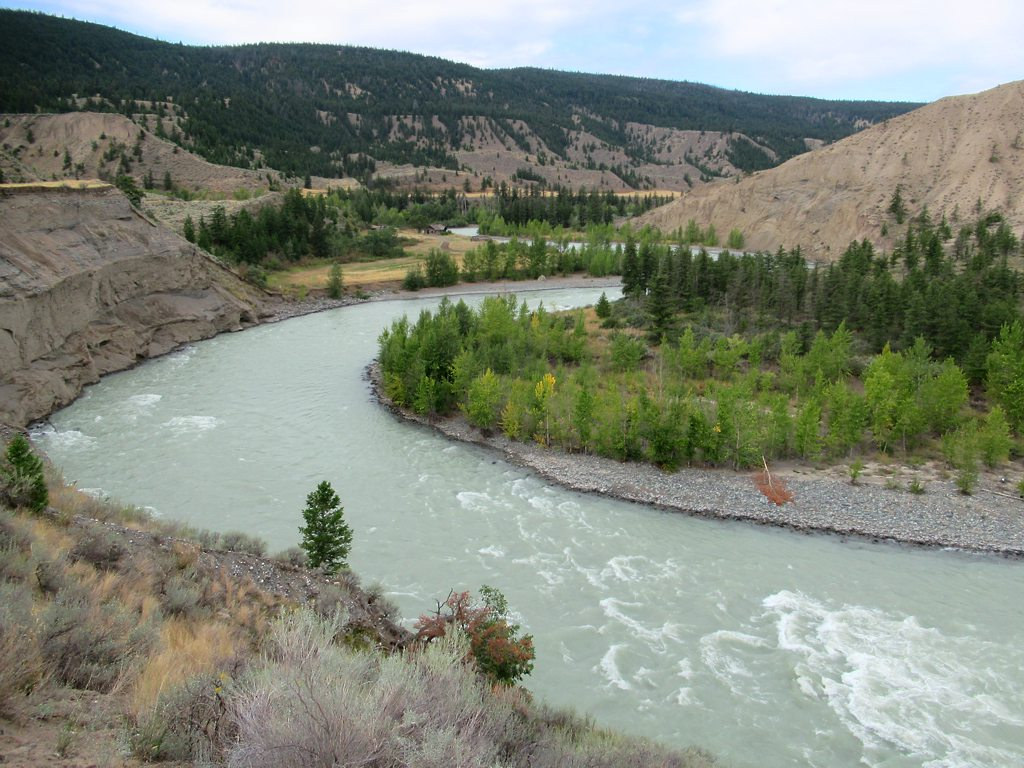
Chilcotin River through Farwell Canyon

From its headwaters, Chilcotin River has many branches. Some branches are headed towards the western part of Chilcotin Plateau. Approximately 80 km (50 mi) from the Coast Range at altitudes of 3,500 to 4,200 feet, water is gathered from small creeks and lakes. The river flows slightly below the upland region of Punkutlaenkut Lake, then westerly towards the Chezakut where the Clusko comes from the north, flowing southwest and south of Chilcotin Lake. The Chilcotin River flows southwest through a deepening valley where it is met by the outlet of Puntzi Lakes. This occurs at Redstone by Chilanko River. The confluence of Chilko River and its main tributary Taseko River meet the Chilcotin River between Redstone and Alexis Creek. At this point, the Chilcotin River is roughly 200 feet below the surface. The valley in this reach also widens and deepens. At Alexis Creek, the river flows towards a basin as it forms a divide with the Nazko. At this point, the river joins form the north and turns southeast towards Hanceville. The valley becomes more deep until it is 1,800 feet below the level of the plateau. At the Fraser-Chilcotin confluence, Chilcotin is 2,220 feet below plateau-level when it is joined by Big Creek Canyon. Between the confluence with its main tributary the Chilko River and its final confluence with the Fraser River, it is approximately 83 km. Through this reach, the Chilcotin River flows through Bull Canyon, Farwell Canyon, and Big Creek Canyon.

The Chilko-Taseko confluence attracts many visitors because the rivers are coloured differently. Taseko River has a milky appearance where as Chilko River has a clear blue appearance. This site is a recreation favourite as it is used for whitewater rafting.

==== Discharge ====
A hydrometric station in Chilcotin River between Big Creek and the Fraser River confluence reported a mean discharge of 102 m^{3}/s between 1971 and 2018. There have been no active, government-operated hydrometric stations on the river since 2018.

The majority of winter precipitation in the Chilcotin Watershed falls as snow, causing Chilcotin River to experience a pronounced spring and early summer freshet, which is stream flooding due to melting snow. The highest average monthly discharge is nearly 10 times that of the month with the lowest discharge.

==== Protected zones ====
The Chilcotin River runs along borders of Bull Canyon Provincial Park, Big Creek Ecological Reserve, and Junction Sheep Range Provincial Park.

=== Major tributaries ===
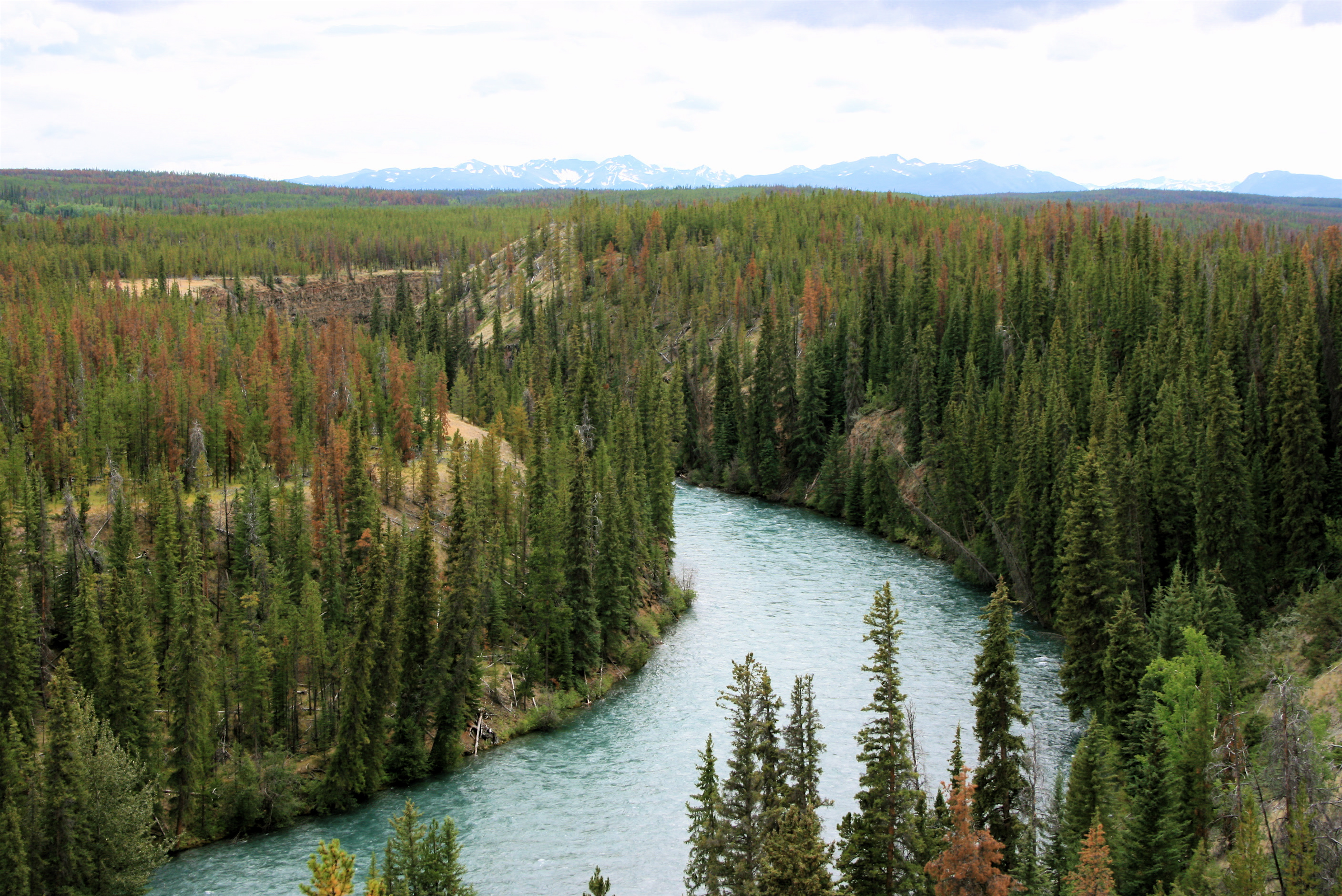
The largest tributary of Chilcotin River is the Chilko River which has a clear blue appearance.

Chilcotin River is composed of seven major tributaries, the largest is Chilko River which is unique because it has a volume greater than the Chilcotin River. These tributaries are part of the Fraser River tributaries and the rivers in British Columbia.

| Tributary name | Location of confluence |
|---|---|
| Moore Creek | 10 km below Chilcotin Falls |
| Punkutlaenkut Creek | 7 km below Moore Creek |
| Clusko River | 8 km above Chilcotin Lake |
| Palmer Creek | western end of Chilcotin Lake |
| Chilanko River | 15.5 km above Chilko River |
| Chilko River | 5 km above Bull Canyon |
| Big Creek | Big Creek Canyon |

=== Climate ===
The annual average temperature between 1951 and 1980 was 5.1 °C (41.18 °F) and between 1981 and 2010 was 6 °C (42.8 °F). Climate Data Canada considered a high emissions scenario to identify annual average temperature projections. Between 2021 and 2050, temperatures were found to be 7.5 °C (45.5 °F), between 2051 and 2080 temperatures were found to be 9.5 °C (49.1 °F), and 10.9 °C (51.62 °F) for the remainder of this century. The average annual precipitation between 1951 and 1980 was 348mm (13.7 inches). Using the same high emissions scenario, annual average precipitation projections were found to be 4% higher for 2021–2050, 11% for 2051-2080m and 12% higher for the remainder of the century. The data collected does not reflect the entire river, therefore climate can vary across the entire river length.

== Cultural significance ==
The Chilcotin River and its tributaries, most notably the Chilko and Taseko Rivers, are significant for the Indigenous people of the Tŝilhqot’in Nation. The annual migration of salmon in these rivers are relied upon by the Tŝilhqot’in to sustain their communities year round; as a food resource, cultural staple, and economic subsidy. To ensure salmon come back after every fishing season, the Tŝilhqot’in National Government (TNG) and the Canadian Department of Fisheries and Oceans (DFO) practice sustainable harvesting and monitor the rivers regularly. However, progressively smaller harvesting outcomes in recent years followed by an assessment done by the Committee on the Status of Endangered Wildlife in Canada (COSEWIC) has prompted the TNG to shut down their fishery operations for 2021 and presently, fishing in the Chilcotin River has ceased.

== Ecology and environment ==
=== Biogeoclimatic ecosystem classification ===
Subboreal pine-spruce biogeoclimatic zone covers 40% of the Chilcotin River watershed. The headwaters of the Chilcotin River are in a montane-spruce zone, and the lowest reach where it confluences with the Fraser River is dominated by bunchgrass. The river also passes through a zone of interior Douglas fir. Over 40% of the watershed area is covered by pine tree species.

=== Biodiversity ===
==== Salmon ====
The Chilcotin River supports populations of coho, chinook, and sockeye salmon, the first two of which are considered threatened by COSEWIC. Salmon are an important cultural, food, and economic resource for the Tŝilhqot’in Nation.

==== Steelhead trout ====
The Chilcotin River hosts a genetically distinct population of steelhead trout (Oncorhynchus mykiss). It migrates from the Bering Sea to the Chilcotin River headwaters every other autumn to spawn, making it one of the longest migrating anadromous trout in Canada. The Chilcotin River steelhead has been classified as endangered and at extreme risk of extinction by COSEWIC. COSEWIC conducted a rarely-used emergency fast-track assessment of the Chilcotin River steelhead in February 2018, after only 58 individuals returned to their spawning grounds in the previous fall, representing a decline of 81% and an all-time low. Despite this, the recommendation to add them to the Government of Canada's List of Wildlife Species at Risk was not approved, and the Chilcotin steelhead remain unprotected by the Species at Risk Act (SARA).

Population declines are a result of factors such as interception by fisheries and competition with hatchery species while out at sea, as well as predation by pinnipeds. Declining habitat quality and interference in spawning pathways by landslides are other contributors.

=== Disturbance ===
==== Flooding ====
In July 2019, the Chilcotin River and surrounding communities experienced extreme rainfall. Subsequent flooding led to mudslides, inundated roadways and the destruction of culverts. Residents were cut off, leaving over 300 people stranded, and 120 properties destroyed.

On July 31, 2024, a major landslide totally blocked (51°50′49.2″N 122°47′18.8″W) the river a few kilometres west above the Farwell Canyon – around 55 km southwest of Williams Lake and 22 km upstream of the Farwell Canyon Bridge crossing the River. The resulting natural dam was estimated to be roughly 600 to 800 m in length, 300 to 600 m in width and 30 m in depth. As of August 2, a temporary lake was forming behind the dam caused by the slide; it grew up to a length of about 11 km. Communities above the slide dam were warned of the potential for flooding due to rising water, and communities below it were warned of the potential for flooding as a result of overflow or failure of the dam. The overflow began on August 5, and the water breached the dam. The flood, which carried away mud and uprooted trees from an area affected by a 2017 wildfire as well as washed away huts (from Pothole Ranch—only 3 river bends above the Farwell Canyon Bridge) among other things, reached the Fraser River relatively quickly. The risk of fast-moving water and debris, which included mature trees, led to emergency alerts and evacuation orders along both the Chilcotin and Fraser Rivers. NASA reported that by 6 August, the Fraser River water levels had peaked at 3,640 cubic metres per second, which was a sharp increase but not a record breaker. The debris reached the Strait of Georgia west of Vancouver, an arm of the Salish Sea of the Pacific Ocean, on August 9.

==== Water quality ====
Water quality is complicated and stressors such as climate change and human development can have adverse impacts. Recently, the Chilcotin River monitoring site has seen increases in metal concentrations. There is not a lot of human development in this area but scientists are investigating the cause or driver of this change, noting that increases in sediments because of changes in streamflow could be an element.

==== Mountain pine beetles ====
British Columbia experiences recurring outbreaks of mountain pine beetle (MPB) populations, with the largest infestations occurring in central BC. MPB causes widespread tree mortality that also raise the risk of wildfire and poses a substantial threat to the timber supply industry. Within central BC, the Chilcotin Plateau has already experienced two major MPB outbreaks, first in the mid-1970s–1980s, and the second in the early 2000s ending in 2010. A team of researchers studying post-MPB infested forests in the Chilcotin Plateau found that although the dominant tree species were not eradicated, MPB outbreaks in the future would make forests unusable for the timber industry in the long term.

== See also ==
- List of rivers of British Columbia
