= Alexandra Bridge Provincial Park =

Provincial park in British Columbia, Canada

Alexandra Bridge Park
- IUCN category III (natural monument or feature)
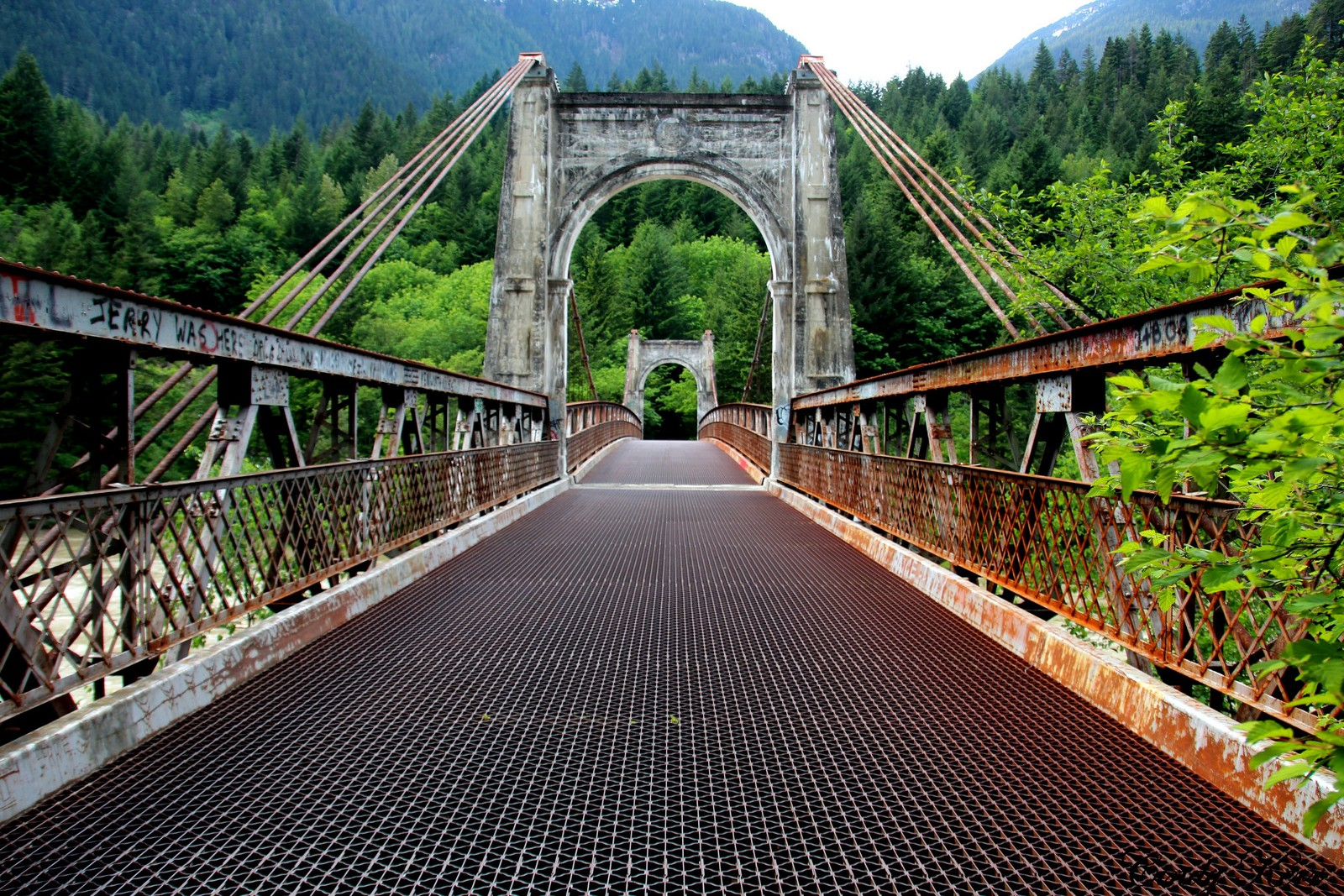
- Second Alexandra Bridge, 2013

- Location within British Columbia Location within Fraser Valley Regional District
- Interactive map of Alexandra Bridge Park
- Location: Fraser Valley RD, British Columbia, Canada
- Coordinates: 49°42′18″N 121°24′23″W
- Area: 51 ha (130 acres)
- Established: March 26, 1984
- Governing body: BC Parks

Alexandra Bridge Park lies within the lower Fraser Canyon of British Columbia, Canada. This provincial park is adjacent to the historic suspension bridge from 1926, which spans the Fraser River and was built using the eastern abutment of the bridge from 1863. The locality, on BC Highway 1, is by road about 44 kilometres (27 mi) north of Hope and 65 kilometres (40 mi) south of Lytton.

== West of the park ==
The Teequaloose 3A reserve is on the western side of bridge. The Nlaka'pamux and Sto:lo First Nations have inhabited the area for about 10,000 years. Evidence exists of an early pole bridge to access important fishing spots. Traditional fishing has continued at the bridge site during the salmon runs.

== North of the park ==
In 1862, Joseph Trutch completed the Chapmans Bar–Boston Bar leg of the Cariboo Road along the east shore.

== South of the park ==
In 1862, the government awarded Trutch & Thomas Spence the southward leg of the road to Pike's Riffle along the west shore. The 13-kilometre (8 mi) length was to be completed by the following spring.

During construction in the early 1880s, the Canadian Pacific Railway (CP) often obliterated existing roads, which in this instance replaced the more durable wagon road southward with flimsy wooden trestles at the water's edge. When clearing the track of snow or slides, CP regarded the wellbeing of the road below as an ongoing encumbrance.

== Ferries ==
Commencing in 1848, the ferry at Spuzzum ran intermittently for 10 years, then actively for five more years.

In the early 1860s, a reaction ferry operated at Chapmans Bar. However, this may well have been the rope ferry close to the planned bridge site.

During construction, the CP installed ferries at Chapmans Bar and Camp 13, which was just south of Hells Gate.

The precise location unclear, an aerial wooden basket ferry existed at least from the early 1920s. Pulling hand over hand on a rope powered this four-person contraption. This appears to have preceded the aerial basket ferry installed in 1925.

== First bridge ==
Tendered in October 1862, the bridge contract was awarded to Joseph Trutch, who engaged Andrew Smith Hallidie, an experienced San Francisco-based suspension bridge engineer. Steamboats transshipped all the steelwork from San Francisco to Yale, from where First Nations completed the conveyance by canoe.

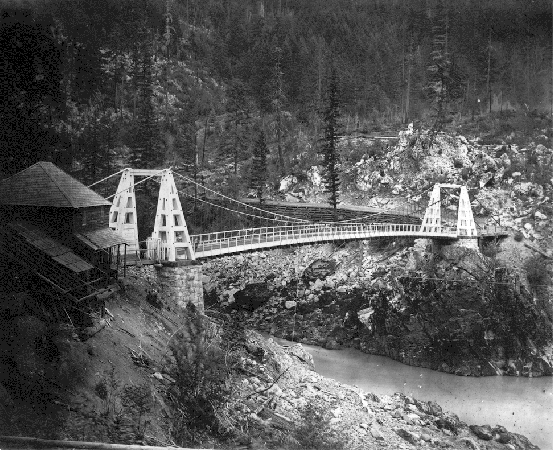
First Alexandra Bridge, 1868. Toll-house at left on west bank.

Abutments were built upon the bedrock. Stretched over the timber towers of the superstructure were steel cables, from which iron rods were attached to the wooden deck. The construction costs, which Trutch financed, were to be recovered by collecting a specified schedule of tolls (pedestrians being free) over a seven-year period. Agreed contract modifications included reducing the width from 5.5 metres (18 ft) inside the handrails to 3.9 metres (12 ft 10 in) inside the curbs, which eliminated the sidewalks.

The bridge, which was named prior to construction, commemorates the marriage of Princess Alexandra of Denmark to the future Edward VII that year. The official opening was September 1863.

The either 80-metre (262 ft) or 82-metre (268 ft) span provided a 27-metre (90 ft) clearance above the river and a 2.7-tonne (3-short-ton) load capacity. Soon after, Trutch became Chief Commissioner of Lands and Works and Surveyor-General, which created a conflict of interest as the bridge owner-operator. An independent review estimated the toll revenue as £58,000 and recommended that the government pay Trutch a discounted amount of £40,000. However, no action was taken, because the government could not afford this settlement. The expedient solution was the placing of some restrictions upon his government job description.

In 1886, the tolls were lifted.

During the 1894 flood, one of the cable anchorages was damaged, which twisted the bridge deck, when the river rose 27 metres (90 ft) from low water level. The CP arrival in the early 1880s, had already reduced usage to mainly foot traffic.

By 1912, crossing the bridge was for risk takers only. That year, the government's severing of the main cables for safety reasons brought all use to an end. During railway construction, the Canadian Northern Railway (CNoR) installed several temporary suspension bridges across the river to access the CP line. Such a structure at the original bridge site fell onto the river in 1912 when the ropes gave way.

== Second bridge ==
In 1925, A.B. Palmer Co was awarded the bridge substructure (including towers) contract. In 1926, day labour erected the steel superstructure and the crossing was completed. The new bridge passed over the eastern abutment of the first bridge but the orientation is different. The length is 84 metres (277 ft), and the width is 4.9 metres (16 ft) to the inside curbs.

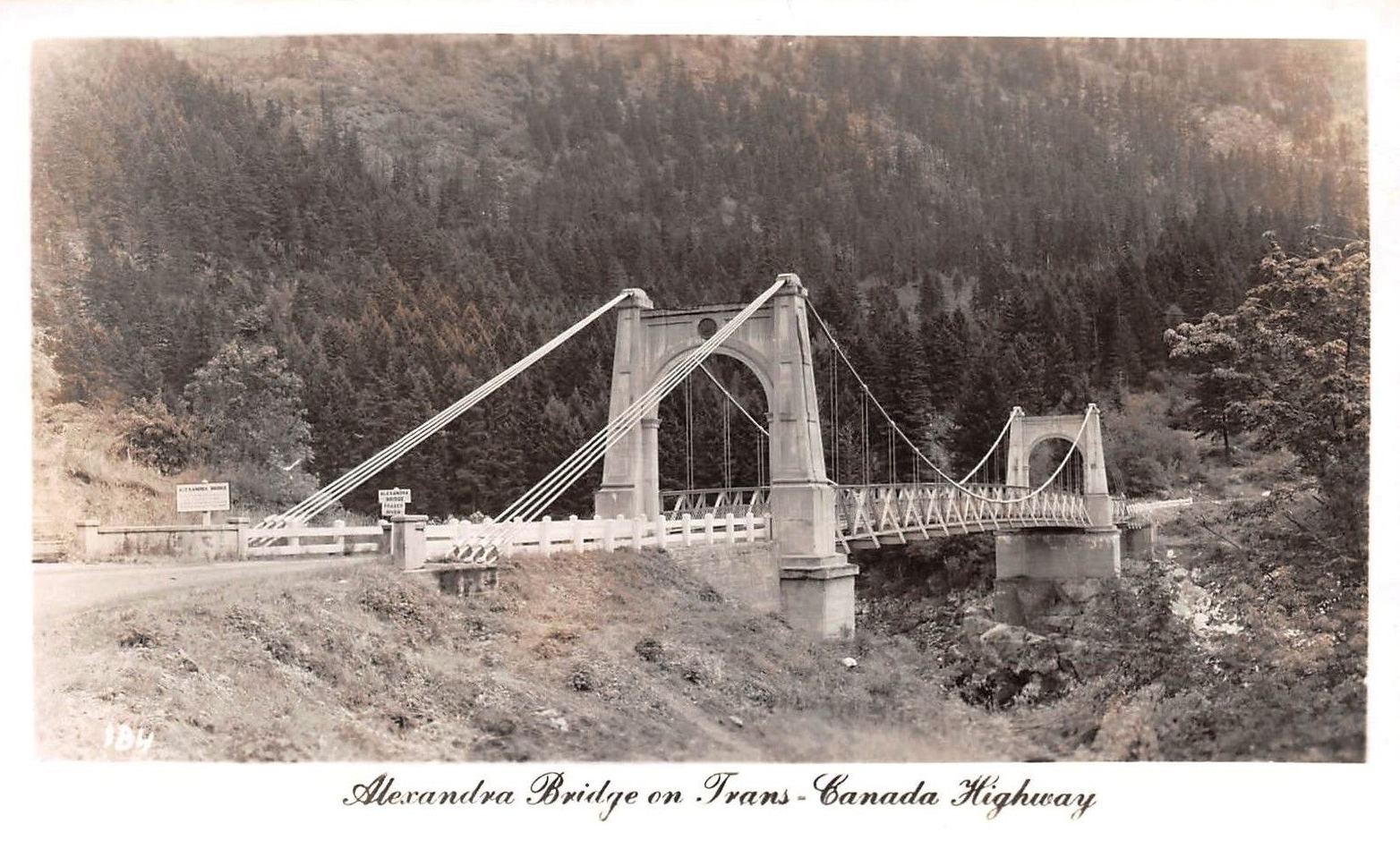
Second Alexandra Bridge, c.1950

The bridge was an integral part of the reconstruction of the original wagon road destroyed earlier by the railway builders. The Fraser Canyon highway officially reopened in May 1927. During the non-winter season, this narrow, gravel road was often blocked by washouts, slides, or freak snowstorms. Paved but not widened in the mid-1930s, passing oncoming traffic often required backing up to the nearest pullout. Since the bridge could handle rigs no longer than 9.1 metres (30 ft), the opening of the Hope–Princeton highway in 1949 provided an alternative route.

In 1936, motorists were given the option of $5 season tolls, instead of $1 each way. In 1938, year-round tolling was introduced, instead of only April 15 to November 15. That year, the toll booth was relocated from Spuzzum to a point about 800 metres (0.5 mi) east of Yale.

In December 1945, tolls were removed. In 1949, a new type of steel grid deck was installed.

The bridge, a national historic site, was decommissioned in 1964. Since 2009, Spuzzum First Nation and the New Pathways to Gold Society (NPTGS) have led a coalition to preserve the structure. Using a $900,000 grant from the provincial government for the first step, work began in 2022 on what will likely be a three- to five-year project.

== Third bridge ==
The present highway bridge opened in 1962.

== Provincial park ==
The 51-hectare (126-acre) park, which straddles the highway, was established in March 1984. The 10-minute walk from the paved parking area (beside the smaller western portion) ranges from paving to gravel, which is steep and narrow in places. Visitors must cross the active Canadian National Railway (CN) track to reach the suspension bridge beyond the park perimeter. The park facilities include six picnic tables and three pit toilets.

== Maps ==
- Lower Fraser Canyon maps 1832–1867.
- Map of current area.

== See also ==
- List of crossings of the Fraser River
- List of bridges in British Columbia
- Royal eponyms in Canada
