= Chilko River =

River in central British Columbia, Canada

Chilko River Tsilhqox
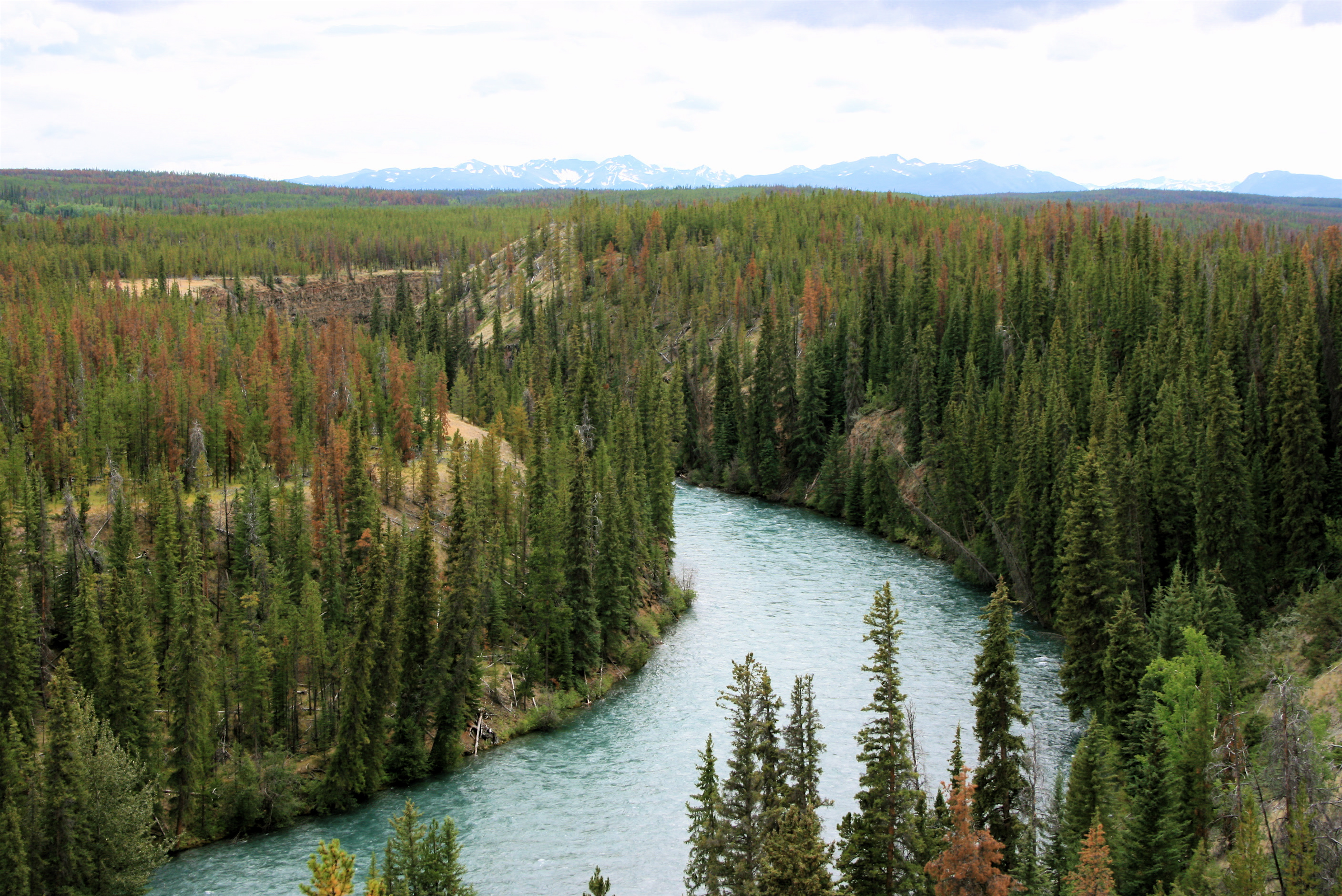
- Chilko River and cliffs made of lava flows and ash beds from former extensive volcanic activity in this region.
- Native name: Tŝilhqóx (Chilcotin)

Location
- Country: Canada
- Province: British Columbia
- District: Cariboo Land District

Physical characteristics
- Source: Chilko Lake
  - location: Chilcotin Plateau
  - coordinates: 51°37′33″N 124°8′30″W
  - elevation: 1,166 m (3,825 ft)
- Mouth: Chilcotin River
  - location: Upstream from Bull Canyon
  - coordinates: 52°5′47″N 123°27′37″W
  - elevation: 739 m (2,425 ft)
- Length: 75 km (47 mi)
- Basin size: 6,880 km^{2} (2,660 sq mi)
- Discharge
  - location: near mouth
  - average: 88.2 m^{3}/s (3,110 cu ft/s)
  - minimum: 7.79 m^{3}/s (275 cu ft/s)
  - maximum: 482 m^{3}/s (17,000 cu ft/s)

Basin features
- Tributaries
  - right: Taseko River

The Chilko River is a 75-kilometre-long (47 mi) river in the Chilcotin District of the Central Interior of British Columbia, Canada, flowing northeast from Chilko Lake to the Chilcotin River. Its main tributary is the Taseko River.

The Chilko is the Chilcotin River's main tributary. In fact at their confluence the Chilko River is much larger than the Chilcotin. It is also the main reason why the lower reaches of the Chilcotin are very silty. The Chilko gets most of its silt from the Taseko River, which joins it a few kilometers above the Chilko's mouth.

== Name origin ==
The name "Chilko" is the product of linguistic anglicisation of the Tŝilhqot’in name Tŝilhqóx, (also spelled without vowel flattening as Tsilhqox). The meaning of the name is contested, and is the subject of much folk etymologising. Some believe the meaning to be "ochre river", but other contenders are "axe river" (from tŝinlh yeqox), "river from the ponderosa pine" (from tsilhtsilh yeqox), or "river with rocks" (from tŝi belh yeqox).

The related name of the Chilcotin River is from that of the Tŝilhqot’in First Nation, from Tŝilhqox Gwet’in, meaning "people of Tŝilhqox".

The name Tŝilhqox refers to the whole Chilko River as well as lower Chilcotin River, with its source at the north end of Chilko Lake and its mouth at its confluence with the Fraser River. Due to a confused naming process, the name "Chilcotin River" refers to only the lower segment of Tŝilhqox, then follows a smaller tributary (Cheẑqox/Chezacut River) northwest to Chilcotin Lake (Cheẑich’ed Biny/Chezacut Lake), and then further north and west along another tributary (Yeqox Gunchagh or "big creek" in Tŝilhqot’in) to its nominal source.

== See also ==
- List of rivers of British Columbia
- List of tributaries of the Fraser River
