= Boston Bar =

Coordinates: 49°51′50″N 121°26′34″W

- Unincorporated place
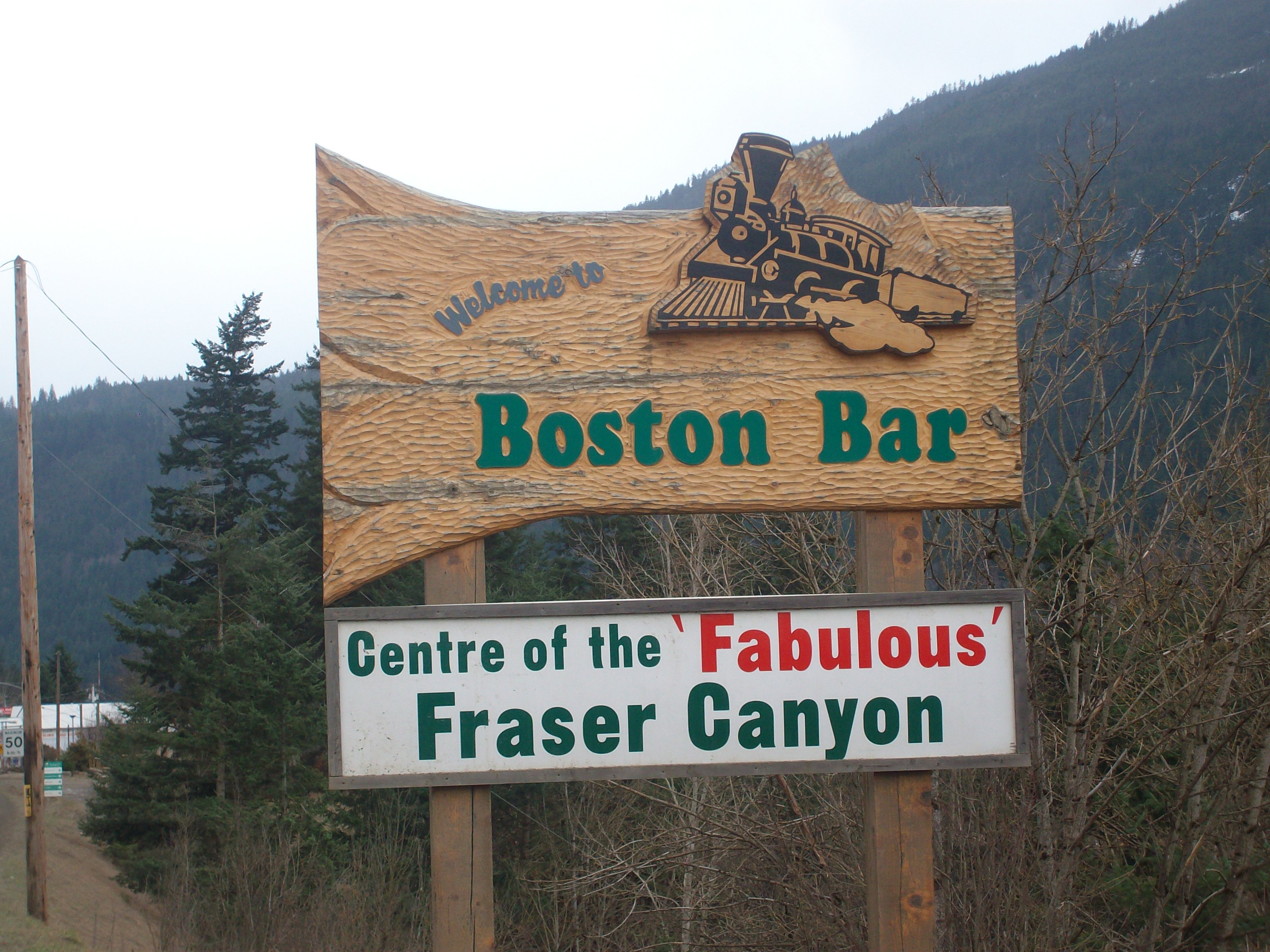
- Boston Bar's welcome sign
- Interactive map of Boston Bar
- Country: Canada
- Province: British Columbia
- Elevation: 166 m (546 ft)

Population (2016)
  - Total: 190
- Time zone: UTC−07:00 (PT)
- Highways: Highway 1 (TCH)

Boston Bar is an unincorporated community in the Fraser Canyon of the Canadian province of British Columbia.

== Name ==
The name dates from the time of the Fraser Canyon Gold Rush (1858–1861). A "bar" is a gold-bearing sandbar or sandy riverbank, and the one slightly down river and opposite today's town was populated heavily by Americans, who were known in the parlance of the Chinook Jargon as "Boston men" or simply "Bostons". A settlement developed on the east bank of the river to the north of the confluence with Anderson River. This was later moved to the present site with the construction of Canadian Northern Pacific Railway.

The original Nlaka'pamuctsin (Thompson Salish) name of Boston Bar was rendered in English-style spelling as Quayome, which appears commonly on frontier-era maps and in diaries and newspapers of the day. The name originally referred to the other side of the river from today's town, but came into use for the present site after the original was renamed North Bend by the Canadian Pacific Railway.

In June 2011, Boston Bar briefly unofficially changed its name to "Vancouver Bar"; this change was an effort to support the nearby Vancouver Canucks hockey team of the NHL in the 2011 Stanley Cup Finals as they took on the Boston Bruins. This followed Canadian restaurant chain Boston Pizza unofficially changing their name to "Vancouver Pizza" during the same round of the playoffs.

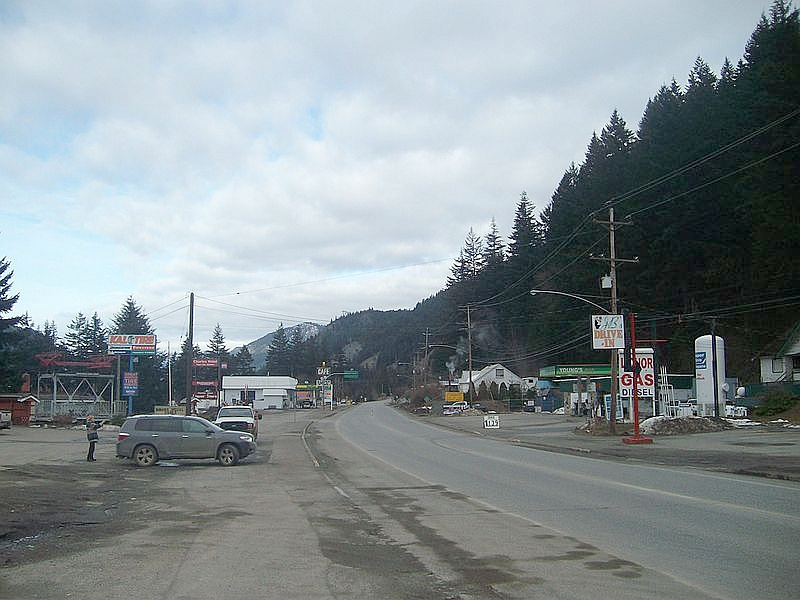
Boston Bar

== North Bend ==
Across the Fraser River is the small town of North Bend. North Bend could only be accessed by rail or by aerial ferry until a two lane bridge was built in January 1986. The Canadian Pacific Railway (CPR) has a small terminal here that is the halfway point between Vancouver and Kamloops. The building of the railway played an important role in this region, first with the construction of the CPR line (1881–1885) then later the Canadian Northern Railway (today the Canadian National Railway) line on the Boston Bar side of the river. Boston Bar is a Canadian National Railway divisional point, where the Ashcroft Subdivision from Kamloops to Boston Bar joins the Yale Subdivision from Boston Bar to Vancouver. North Bend is also at the doorstep of the Nahatlatch Valley, a chain of three lakes and the Nahatlatch River.

== Climate ==
Boston Bar sits in a pocket climate created by the confines of the canyon, and though on the edge of the coastal temperate zone just to the south, its climate is subject to the seasonal extremes of temperature common in the interior of the province. It enjoys 4 very distinct seasons with temperatures reaching up to 35–40 °C in the summer and down to −5 to −10 °C in the winter. It is notably the first place inland up the Fraser Canyon where rainfall levels are markedly lower than the rainier stretches from Yale and Spuzzum north to Hell's Gate.

The climate is transitional between marine west coast and continental. The heaviest precipitation occurs in winter, which also has the strongest marine influence in most years. The continental influence is most pronounced in summer, which is hot. The vegetation has a mixture of rain forest and dry interior plant species with bigleaf maple and western red cedar prominent among the rain forest species and ponderosa pine, more common northward, standing tall as one of the Interior species. Douglas-fir is the most common tree. Boston Bar is in the Interior Douglas-fir zone, wet warm subzone (IDFww).

One consequence of the climate is that Boston Bar is in the range of the northern Pacific rattlesnake, which is common in areas farther upstream along the Fraser and Thompson Rivers, such as Lytton.

Boston Bar has a warm-summer mediterranean climate (Csb).

Boston Bar experienced wildfires during the 2021 Western North America heat wave, with firefighters battling them. The highway between the town and Spences Bridge was closed in early July 2021 and many residents of nearby Lytton were evacuated to Boston Bar after Lytton was almost completely destroyed by wildfires due to extreme temperatures.

Climate data for Boston Bar 1981-2010 (49.863 -121.444)
Month	Jan	Feb	Mar	Apr	May	Jun	Jul	Aug	Sep	Oct	Nov	Dec	Year
Mean daily maximum °C (°F)	2.0 (35.6)	5.4 (41.7)	10.7 (51.3)	16.2 (61.2)	20.6 (69.1)	24.1 (75.4)	28.3 (82.9)	28.3 (82.9)	22.8 (73.0)	13.8 (56.8)	5.8 (42.4)	1.2 (34.2)	14.9 (58.9)
Daily mean °C (°F)	−0.4 (31.3)	1.9 (35.4)	5.9 (42.6)	10.1 (50.2)	14.1 (57.4)	17.5 (63.5)	20.9 (69.6)	20.8 (69.4)	15.9 (60.6)	9.5 (49.1)	3.3 (37.9)	−1.2 (29.8)	9.9 (49.7)
Mean daily minimum °C (°F)	−2.8 (27.0)	−1.6 (29.1)	1.1 (34.0)	3.9 (39.0)	7.5 (45.5)	11.0 (51.8)	13.4 (56.1)	13.4 (56.1)	9.0 (48.2)	5.2 (41.4)	0.8 (33.4)	−3.6 (25.5)	4.8 (40.6)
Average precipitation mm (inches)	103 (4.1)	76 (3.0)	64 (2.5)	38 (1.5)	35 (1.4)	32 (1.3)	17 (0.7)	19 (0.7)	36 (1.4)	89 (3.5)	137 (5.4)	112 (4.4)	758 (29.9)
Source: http://www.climatewna.com/ClimateBC_Map.aspx

== See also ==
- Boston Bar railway station
- List of Chinook Jargon placenames
