= List of place names in Canada of Indigenous origin =

This list of place names in Canada of Indigenous origin contains Canadian places whose names originate from the words of the First Nations, Métis, or Inuit, collectively referred to as Indigenous peoples. When possible, the original word or phrase used by Indigenous Peoples is included, along with its generally believed meaning. Names listed are only those used in English or French, as many places have alternate names in the local native languages, e.g. Alkali Lake, British Columbia, is Esket in the Shuswap language; Lytton, British Columbia, is Camchin in the Thompson language (often used in English however, as Kumsheen).

== Canada ==
The name Canada comes from the word meaning "village" or "settlement" in the Saint-Lawrence Iroquoian language spoken by the inhabitants of Stadacona and the neighbouring region near present-day Quebec City in the 16th century. Another contemporary meaning was "land." Jacques Cartier was first to use the word "Canada" to refer not only to the village of Stadacona, but also to the neighbouring region and to the Saint-Lawrence River.

In other Iroquoian languages, the words for "town" or "village" are similar: Mohawk uses kaná:taʼ, Seneca iennekanandaa, and Onondaga uses ganataje.

== Provinces and territories ==
Provinces and territories whose official names are aboriginal in origin are Yukon, Saskatchewan, Manitoba, Ontario, Quebec and Nunavut.

- Manitoba: Either derived from the Cree word manito-wapâw meaning "the strait of the spirit or manitobau" or the Assiniboine words mini and tobow meaning "Lake of the Prairie", referring to Lake Manitoba.
- Nunavut: "Our land" in Inuktitut.
- Ontario: Derived from the Huron word onitariio meaning "beautiful lake", or kanadario meaning "sparkling" or "beautiful" water.
- Quebec: from the Míkmaq word kepék, meaning "strait" or "narrows".
- Saskatchewan: Derived from the Cree name for the Saskatchewan River, kisiskāciwani-sīpiy, meaning "swift flowing river".
- Yukon: from an Athabaskan language, e.g. Koyukon yookkene or Lower Tanana yookuna.

== By province and territory ==
=== Alberta ===
- Alexis Nakota Sioux Nation no. 437 (formerly "Indian Reserve") named after the Alexis family, prominent in the band
- Amisk: "Beaver" in Cree.
- Athabasca: "Where there are reeds" in Cree (formerly spelled Athabaska)
  - Athabasca (town)
  - Athabasca River
  - Athabasca Falls
  - Lake Athabasca
  - Mount Athabasca,
- Battle River translation of Cree place name. There were many fights in its area between Cree, Blackfoot and Nakoda.
- Bear Hills Lake translation of Cree place name.
- Bear Hill translation of Cree place name.
- Beaver Hills (includes today's Elk Island Park) translation of Cree, Blackfoot and Nakoda place names for the feature. Cree name for area is amiskwaciy, Cree name for Edmonton is amiskwaciwâskahikan (Beaver Mountain House,
- Blood Reserve 148 (formerly Indian reserve) Kinai First Nation, name roughly translated as Blood in the past
- Bow River English translation of Blackfoot name for the river – Makhabn, "river where bow reeds grow" (Blackfoot), reeds there were good for making bows with which to shoot arrows.
- Bow Valley Natural Area (see Bow River)
- Calgary roads (trails) named after Indigenous nations and an element of Métis lifestyle—Stoney, Blackfoot, Metis, Shaganappi, Sarcee, and Peigan Trails are all named in honour of the first people on this continent, although the latter two have since changed their names. The Peigan are now known as the Piikani Nation and the Sarcee are now the Tsuut’ina Nation, but both street names remain.
- Chipewyan: "duck lake" (includes Fort Chipewyan)
- Cooking Lake is a translation of its Cree place name opi-mi-now-wa-sioo, indicating a cooking place.
- Crowfoot Crossing—named after Crowfoot, chief of the Siksika First Nation and signatory of treaty. He was instrumental during the Treaty 7 negotiations and acted as a representative of his people.
- Deerfoot Trail: after Deerfoot-Bad Meat, a Blackfoot man who was known around Calgary
- Edmonton wards (municipal election districts) all bear names of Indigenous origin, since 2020.
  - Nakoda Isga: Sioux, "the people," referring to the Alexis Nakota Sioux Nation.
  - O-day’min: Anishinaabe, "strawberry," literally "heart berry," invoking the image of "the heart [of the city] through which the North Saskatchewan River runs."
  - Anirniq – Pronunciation: /əˈnɜːrknɪk/ ə-NURK-nik: Inuktun, "breath of life," honouring Inuit who were brought to Edmonton in the 1950s and 1960s for treatment for tuberculosis, being separated from their families for long periods and often mistreated; many died and were buried in Edmonton.
  - tastawiyiniwak (ᑕᐢᑕᐃᐧᔨᓂᐊᐧᐠ) – Pronunciation: /ˌtæstəˈwiːnəwək/ TASS-tə-WEE-nə-wək: Cree, "the in-between people," referring to the two-spirit and LGBTQ+ communities
  - Dene – Pronunciation: /ˈdɛneɪ/ DEN-ay: Dene language, "the people," referring to the Dene people
  - Métis – Pronunciation: /meɪˈtiː/ may-TEE: Michif, "Métis people," who farmed in this area
  - sipiwiyiniwak – Pronunciation: /ˌsiːpiːˈwɪnəwək/ SEE-pee-WIN-nə-wək: Enoch Cree, "river Cree," referring to the Enoch Cree people
  - papastew – Pronunciation: /ˌpɑːpəˈsteɪoʊ/ PAH-pə-STAY-oh: Papaschase Cree, "woodpecker," the name of the Papaschase people, commemorating Chief Papaschase or Papastew (ca. 1838–1918)
  - pihêsiwin ᐱᐦᐁᓯᐏᐣ – Pronunciation: /piːˈheɪsəwən/ pee-HAY-sə-wən: Cree, "land of the thunderbirds"
  - Ipiihkoohkanipiaohtsi – Pronunciation: /ɪˌpiːkoʊkəˈniːpjɑːoʊtsiː/ i-PEE-koh-kə-NEE-pyah-oht-see: Blackfoot, "northward migration of the bison"
  - Karhiio – Pronunciation: /ˌɡɑːrəˈhiːoʊ/ GAR-ə-HEE-oh: Mohawk, "tall beautiful forest" (name of Michel Karhiio, chief of the Michel First Nation)
  - Sspomitapi – Pronunciation: /ˌspoʊmɪtəˈpiː/ SPOH-mih-tə-PEE: Blackfoot, "star person," a sacred iron meteorite, also known as the Iron Creek Meteorite or Manitou Stone (Manitou Asinîy), now in the Royal Alberta Museum
- Ermineskin Reserve 138 (formerly Indian reserve) owned by Ermineskin Cree Nation, one of the Four Nations of Maskwacis
- Goosequill Lake translation of Cree word Manikwanan for the lake.
- Grand Forks: translation of Blackfoot name for the place
- Grand Prairie: translation of Cree name "Big Prairie"
- Ipiatik Lake.
- James Mowatt Trail. James Mowatt (Métis, born in St. Andrews, Manitoba) carried message from Edmonton to Calgary during 1885 rebellion, asking for military assistance for Edmonton, which was thought to be under threat of Native uprising. He made the trip in only 36 hours, a record at that time. He later was a gold-rusher and then moved back to Manitoba.
- Kakisa River.
- Kakwa River.
- Kananaskis
- Kapasiwin: Cree for 'campsite'
- Kapawe'no First Nation
- Kaskitayo: Edmonton community. Originally spelled Kaskiteeo, this name is derived from the Cree word, noted by J. B. Tyrrell in the 1870s as kas-ki-tee-oo-asiki, meaning 'blackmud creek'. (Neighbourhood names in the Kaskitayo area honour Aboriginal leaders – Bearspaw, Big Bear, Ermineskin, Kainai)
- Kikino Trail, Edmonton. The name of this trail, a major walkway in the Thorncliff neighbourhood, reflects the theme of most of Edmonton’s walkways, which are named for prominent Aboriginal people or have a relationship with Aboriginal heritage. Kikino is said to be the Cree word for “our home.” Kikino Trail is one of a number of trail names approved between 1969 and 1971. This name has been in use since 1895. While its origin is not recorded, the name is taken from the Cree word kinokamâw, which means “a long lake.”
- Kimiwan: Cree word for rainy
- Kitaskino Nuwenëné Wildland Provincial Park (Wood Buffalo Park). Kitaskino Nuwenëné is both Cree and Dene meaning “our land.”
- Lake Minnewanka: "Water of the Spirits" in Sioux (Nakoda/Stoney language)
- Lily Lake—name is translation of Indigenous place name.
- Little Plume, former locality S of Medicine Hat. Named after South Peigan chief Tom Little Plume (1889-1971), who served in the First World War.
- Makaoo. Cree name of early leader of the band, the Onion Lake Cree Nation in Alberta and Saskatchewan,.
- Ma-Me-O Beach: from Cree: omîmîw, lit. 'pigeon'.
- Manawan Lake: Cree for "egg-gathering place".
- Many Island Lake, east of Medicine Hat. trans of Cree place name aka-amuskie-skway or aka-naywass, many islands.
- Manyberries, calque of Blackfoot place name akoniskway, many berries.
- Marie Lake: derived from the Cree word for the place methai, pronounced merai, which translates as a fish.
- Maskêkosihk Trail (formerly 23 Avenue between 215 Street and Anthony Henday Drive) Road of the "people of the land of medicine" in Cree
- Maskepetoon Park (Red Deer) after Chief Maskepetoon (1807–1869). Said to be the "Gandhi of the Plains", he made temporary peace between the Cree and the Siksika before being killed by an enemy.
- Maskwa Creek near Wetaskiwin (Cree for 'black bear')
- Maskwacis (formerly known as Hobbema): collection of several First Nations name translates as 'bear hills'.
- Matchayaw Lake: Cree for bad spirit. Palliser translated the name as Little Manitoo in 1865.
- Medicine Hat: Translation of the Blackfoot word saamis, meaning "headdress of a medicine man".
- Meeting Creek: English translation of the Cree name nukh-kwa-ta-to, which references the frequent meeting between the Cree and Blackfoot there.
- Metiskow: Cree for 'many trees'.
- Mewassin: Cree for 'good, beautiful'.
- Minaik: Cree (also Nakoda) "Minahik" for evergreen (pine or tamarack)
- Michichi: Cree for 'hand' (nearby Hand Hills has the same source).
- Mikkwa River: Cree, 'it is red'.
- Ministik (in the Beaver Hills UNESCO Biosphere Reserve) a former school district (Ministik School District #1796). Ministik Lake is nearby. Ministik means 'island' in Cree.
- Mitsue Creek.
- Mokowan Ridge.
- Moose Lake. Known to early French-Canadian fur traders as lac d'Orignal, meaning Moose Lake. This may have been a direct translation of the local Cree name of the same meaning, mōswa sākahikan.
- Namaka (hamlet) Blackfoot name "near the water", referring to nearby Bow River or Eagle Lake.
- Nemiskam (locality S of Medicine Hat). Blackfoot place name trans. as between two coulées.
- Neutral Hills Name commemorates the place where the Cree and Blackfoot made peace and chose to share the area's bison, ending decades-long fighting there.
- Nikanassin Range: "First range" in Cree
- Nose Creek within limits of Calgary. Name is trans. of Cree place name os-kewun.
- Nose Hill northeast of Coronation. Name is translation of Cree name os-ke-wu-na-chio
- Nose Hill within the limits of Calgary. Named prior to whites' arrival due to resemblance to the nose of a Native chief, or due to a nose being bitten off there during a fracas in the old days.
- Notikewin (hamlet) and Notikewin River. The name derives from nôtinikewin, the Cree word for "battle".
- Okotoks: "Big Rock" in Blackfoot
- Old Women's Buffalo Jump, 60 km south of Calgary. Name is derived from Blood legend about Old Man (see Oldman River) not finding a wife among the women at the buffalo jump and turning himself into a lone pine tree on the site.
- Oldman River. The Piikani Nation of the Blackfoot Confederacy named the river after their traditional sacred ground at its headwaters, said to the "Old Man's Playing Ground," sacred ground of Napi, the Old Man, the Great Creator.
- Otoskwan school district and railway siding on outskirts of Edmonton, now within Edmonton. Named after Cree name for nearby water-course Blackmud Creek. Otoskwan translates as big tributary. (William Peter Baergen, Pioneering with A Piece of Chalk)
- Pakan locality (formerly Victoria Settlement) south of Smoky Lake. The Chief at the Whitefish Reserve bore the name Pakan. He was also known as James Seenum. Nearby Pakan Lake and Pakan Creek arise from the same source.)
- Pakkwaw Lake northeast of Innisfail—The Cree name for the shallow slough translates as dry or shallow
- Papaschase Industrial Park (Edmonton) named after Chief Papaschase (Papastayo) (ca. 1838–1918) or his band. (South Edmonton Saga)
- Peace Hills in Wetaskiwin area. Peace treaty between Cree and Blackfoot arranged there in 1867. Name of City of Wetaskiwin nearby has same source
- Peace River translation of Dane-zaa language river name unjigah, which is derived from peace made in late 1700s between two groups along its shores.
- Peigan – former school district (No. 3430).
- Pekisko from Blackfoot place name pik-isko translates as "rough ridge" or "rolling hills".
- Pembina River—corruption of the Cree name neepinmenaw, "summer berry" the names of the Pembina locality, southwest of Drayton Valley, and Pembina River Provincial Park come from same source.)
- Piikani 147 Indian Reserve (on which Brocket is located) owned by Piikani Nation (formerly the Peigan Nation).
- Pipestone River translation of Cree and possibly Nakoda place name, derived from it being source of stone to make pipes.
- Ponoka: attempt to use its Blackfoot name ponokáwa "Elk" (Hugh A. Dempsey, Indian Names for Alberta Communities, p. 16;)
- Poundmaker Trail: named after Cree chief Poundmaker
- Prairie Creek: translation of Cree and Nakoda place name.
- Pretty Hill: translation of Cree place name.
- Princess Lake: translation of Cree place name.
- Rabbit Hill (Edmonton): translation of Cree place name.
- Red Deer River: Name derived from Cree place name was-ki-sioo (elk). Early Scottish settlers in area thought area's elk were same as the red deer of their home country.
- Red River: colour of water in river (red from its high iron content).
- Redearth Creek: soil on its shores used by Natives as body paint.
- Redearth Pass: soil in pass used by First Nations as body paint.
- Redwater (river and town): translation of Cree name "red water".
- Redwillow Creek: form of translation of Cree place name literally "red feathers/bristles small river".
- Sakaw (neighbourhood in southside Edmonton)
- Saskatchewan River, North and South Saskatchewan River. Derived from the Cree name for the Saskatchewan River, kisiskāciwani-sīpiy, meaning "swift flowing river"
- Saskatoon Mountain Natural Area
- Seven Persons translation of Blackfoot name kitsikitapi-itsinitupi "seven persons were killed" (Hugh A. Dempsey, Indian Names for Alberta Communities, p. 17) (see Hugh A. Dempsey, "A Blackfoot Winter Count" for full story.)
- Shaganappi Trail (Calgary). Shaganappi are rawhide strips. Used to repair a myriad of objects, it was the duct tape of its time.
- Skoki Mountain and Skoki valley. Stoney Nakoda word for swamp. There are several in the area.
- Skyrattler (neighbourhood in southside Edmonton)
- Slave Lake: "Slave" was a mis-translation of the Cree word for foreigner to describe the Athabaskan people living there. (see Slave River, NWT, below)
- Smoky Lake: This town's name comes from the Cree name for the almost-now-disappeared lake nearby. Wood Cree named it Smoking Lake for either the large number of campfires around it often, or smouldering coal-fires in the ground, or the unusually large quantities of mist that came off it at sunset. (Hugh A. Dempsey, Indian Names for Alberta Communities, p. 17)
- Sounding Lake, in the Neutral Hills. Name is based on Native legend wherein a Great Eagle, Mikisew, emerges from the waters and takes off across the hills, its great wings making a noise like thunder.
- Spirit River translation of Cree name for nearby water-course chipi-sipi "spirit river" (Hugh A. Dempsey, Indian Names for Alberta Communities, p. 17)
- Stony Plain translation of Cree name asinipwat-muskatayo "Stony (Native) plain" (Hugh A. Dempsey, Indian Names for Alberta Communities, p. 18)
- Sucker Creek translation of Cree name nimipi-sipisis "sucker (fish) creek" (Hugh A. Dempsey, Indian Names for Alberta Communities, p. 18)
- Tawatinaw Lake north of Athabasca
- Tawatinaw River flows into Athabasca River near Athabasca north of Edmonton
- Tawatinaw (hamlet) near Highway 2 about 100 km north of Edmonton
- Tawayik Lake Elk Island Park, east of Edmonton
- Tecumseh, Mount a mountain in the Crowsnest Pass area
- Tepee Lake, northeast of Lac La Biche
- Tipaskan (neighbourhood in southside Edmonton)
- Tongue creek (tributary of Highwood River). Name harkens to Native legend of Old Man being tricked by Wolf and Mouse eating his elk tongues. Cree place name natsina (tongue)
- Twin Butte may be derived from Blackfoot name natsikapway-tomo "double hill" (Hugh A. Dempsey, Indian Names for Alberta Communities, p. 18)
- Two Hills (town) about 120 kilometres east of Edmonton in 54-12-W4. May be derived from Cree name misoyik-kispakinasik "two hills" (Hugh A. Dempsey, Indian Names for Alberta Communities, p. 18)
- Two Hills Lake 55-1-W4. named due to proximity to two hills. trans. of Cree place name nis-wa kis-pa-tin-ak, also rendered as the two big hills.
- Unipouheos Indian Reserve No. 121 northwest of Lloydminster named after Chief Unipouheos, who was chief in 1879
- Valley of Ten Peaks includes three peaks named after the numerals of the Stoney language:
  - Mount Tonsa (no. 4)
  - Neptuak Mountain (no. 9)
  - Wenkchemna Peak (no. 10). (Another peak in the valley, Mount Tuzo, was named Shagowa, Stoney for 7, in 1894 but name changed after its first ascent by Henrietta L. Tuzo in 1907.)
- Vermilion River translation of Cree name for the water-course, weeyaman-sipi "red paint river" (Hugh A. Dempsey, Indian Names for Alberta Communities, p. 18)
- Vermilion, see Vermilion River, which is nearby. (Names for County of Vermilion River, Vermilion Provincial Park, Vermilion Park Lake come from the same source.)
- Wabamun: (lake and town west of Edmonton) is a Cree word for "mirror" or "looking glass"
  - Wabamun 133A
  - Wabamun 133B
  - Wabamun Lake
  - Wabamun Lake Provincial Park
- Wabasca hamlet, lakes, river, and oil field. Also Wabasca 166, a group of Indian reserves. from Cree language wapuskau, grassy narrows. formerly spelled Wabiskaw in name of Wabiskaw lakes (80-26-W4) and Wabiskaw River (trib. of Peace River)
- Wahsatnow Lake 25-58-13-W4, named after Native farmer in area perhaps ca. 1900 (likely reference to same family that was source of place name Waskatenau)
- Wahstao post office, 59-15-W4. corruption of Cree word wahsato, spiritual light. Named in 1907 by Peter Erasmus.
- Wapiabi creek (trib of Brazeau River) Stoney word for grave, due to presence of a grave along its banks when named in 1910.
- Wapiti River: from the Cree word for "elk", waapiti (literally "white rump").
- Waputik Range: Waputik means "white goat" in Stoney
- Waskahigan River (trib. of Little Smoky River) Cree for house
- Waskatenau: village and creek. Pronounced with silent "k." In 1880s area was home to the Wah-Sat-Now (Cree) band, which later moved to the Saddle Lake reserve. The band was also known as the Muskegwatic Band. Cree term for "opening in the banks", in reference to the cleft in the nearby ridge through which the Waskatenau Creek flows. (see Wahsatnow)
- Wastach pass. Stony for beautiful
- Wastina post office 31-8-W4. established in 1912. corruption of Cree miwasin, pretty place.
- Wetaskiwin: "Place of peace" or "hill of peace" in Cree
- wîhkwêntôwin, Edmonton: Cree for 'circle of friends'.
- Yoho Park. The Cree word yoho is used the same way as the English "wow."

=== British Columbia ===
For the scores of BC place names from the Chinook Jargon, see List of Chinook Jargon place names.

==== A–B ====
- Ahnuhati River: "where the humpback salmon go" in Kwak'wala
- Ahousat: "people living with their backs to the mountains" in Nuu-chah-nulth (Nootka).
- Aiyansh and New Aiyansh: "early leaves" or "leafing early" in the Nisga'a language
- Akamina Pass: "mountain pass" in Ktunaxa (Kootenay)
- Akamina Ridge: "high bench land" in Ktunaxa (Kootenay)
- Akie River: "cut-bank river" in Dunne-za
- Amiskwi River: "beaver trail" in Cree
- Anyox: "place of hiding" in Nisga'a
- Ashlu Creek
- Ashnola River: thought to mean "white water" in Okanagan
- Asitka River, Asitka Peak, Asitka Lake
- Askom Mountain: "mountain" in St'at'imcets (the Lillooet language)
- Atchelitz: "bay" or "inlet" in Halqemeylem,
- Atlin: "big lake" in Inland Tlingit
- Atna Range: "strangers" or "other people" in Carrier.
- Atnarko River: "river of strangers" in Chilcotin
- Atsutla Range
- Attachie: the name of a Beaver indian whose descendants are members of the nearby Doig River First Nation
- Bella Coola: Named for the usual term for the local indigenous people, who call themselves Nuxalk. Bella Coola is an adaption of [bəlxwəla], the Heiltsuk name for the Nuxalk; their meaning is not limited to the band at Bella Coola but to all Nuxalk.
- Bella Bella: This is an adaption of the Heiltsuk name for themselves, [pəlbálá].
- Botanie Mountain, Botanie Creek, Botanie Valley etc., meaning "covered", "covering" or "blanketed all over" in Nlaka'pamux (Thompson), which is thought to be a reference to its shroud of cloud or fog in times of bad weather, or else a reference to the abundant plant cover in the area. An 1894 account of a Secwepemc (Shuswap) meaning is "many root place" (the upper end of the Botanie Valley is near the limit of Secwepemc territory)

==== C ====
- Canim Lake, Canim River, Canim Falls, Canim Beach Provincial Park: "canoe" in the Chinook Jargon
- Cariboo: from the Mi'kmaq language xalibu or Qalipu via French caribou (1610) cariboeuf or carfboeuf: "pawer" or "scratcher". (Note: Marc Lescarbot in his publication in French 1610 used the term "caribou." Silas Tertius Rand included the term Kaleboo in his Mi'kmaq-English dictionary in 1888.) A mountain subspecies of caribou were once numerous.
- Carmanah Creek, Carmanah Valley, Carmanah Point: "thus far upstream" in the Nitinaht dialect of (Nuu-chah-nulth).
- Cassiar: a remote adaptation of Kaska, definition debatable, but possibly "old moccasins".
- Caycuse River: from the Nitinaht dialect of Nuu-chah-nulth language, meaning "place where they fix up canoes".
- Cayoosh Creek: Cayoosh is a Lillooet-area variant of cayuse, originally from the Spanish caballo – "horse", although in Lillooet and the Chilcotin this word specifies a particular breed of Indian mountain pony. There are two versions of the name's meaning. In one account, someone's pony dropped dead in or at the creek after an arduous journey over the pass at the head of its valley. In the other, the crest of standing waves in the rushing waters of the creek are said to resemble bucking horses and their manes.
- Celista, British Columbia: from the Secwepemc chiefly and family name Celesta, common in the nearby community of Neskonlith near Chase.
- Chaba Peak: from the Stoney language word for "beaver".
- Chantslar Lake: from the Chilcotin language word for "steelhead lake"
- Cheakamus River: from the Squamish language "Chiyakmesh", for "salmon weir place".
- Cheam: Halqemeylem for "(place to) always get strawberries". The Halqemeylem term refers to an island across from the present-day reserve and village. This name is used in English for Mount Cheam (Cheam Peak), the most prominent of the Four Sisters Range east of Chilliwack, which in Halqemeylem is called Thleethleq (the name of Mount Baker Kulshan's wife, turned to stone).
- Chechidla Range – from a phrase meaning "mountains of small rocks" in the Tahltan language
- Checleset Bay: from the Nuu-chah-nulth language name Cheklesahht, "people of cut on the beach", the local group of Nuu-chah-nulth people, whose band government today is the Kyuquot/Cheklesahht First Nation.
- Chedakuz Arm (Knewstubb Lake), Carrier language
- Cheewat River: from the Nitinaht dialect of Nuu-chah-nulth for "having an island nearby".
- Cheekye River and the locality of Cheekye near Squamish: from Nch'kay, the Squamish language name for Mount Garibaldi, meaning "dirty place" in reference to that mountain's ash-stained snows
- Chehalis and Chehalis River: probable meanings vary from "the place one reaches after ascending the rapids" or "where the 'chest' of a canoe grounds on a sandbar'. The sandbar or rapids in question would be the old "riffles" of the Harrison River where it empties into the Fraser River out of Harrison Bay (the riffles were dredged out in gold rush times). The Chehalis people refer to themselves, however, as Sts'ailes, "beating heart".
- Cheja Range – from a phrase meaning "mountains are hard" in the Tahltan language
- Chemainus: Named after the native shaman and prophet Tsa-meeun-is, which means "Broken Chest" or "bitten breast"(Hulquminum language), a reference to the bitemarks possible during a shamanic frenzy, which the local horseshoe-shaped bay is thought to have resembled.
- Cheslatta Lake: "top of small mountain" or "small rock mountain at east side" in the Carrier language
- Chezacut: "birds without feathers" in the Chilcotin language.
- Chic Chic Bay: Tshik-tshik, under various spellings, is the Chinook Jargon for a wagon or wheeled vehicle.
- Chikamin Range: Chickamin, as usually spelled, is "metal" or "ore" in the Chinook Jargon, often meaning simply "gold"
- Chilako River: "beaver hand river" in the Carrier language
- Chilanko River: "many beaver river" in the Chilcotin language
- Chilcotin River: "red ochre river people" in the Chilcotin language
- Chilkat Pass: "salmon storehouse" in the Tlingit language
- Chilko River: "red ochre river" in the Chilcotin language
- Chilliwack: "Going back up" in Halqemeylem. Other translations are "quieter water on the head" or "travel by way of a backwater of slough", all a reference to the broad marshlands and sloughs of the Chilliwack area, which lies between the Fraser River's many side-channels and Sumas Prairie (much of formerly Sumas Lake). Older spellings are Chilliwhack, Chilliwayhook, Chil-whey-uk, Chilwayook, and Silawack.
- Chinook Cove: on the North Thompson River, a reference to the Chinook salmon rather than to the language, wind or people of the same name.
- Choelquoit Lake: "fishtrap lake" in the Chilcotin language
- Chonat Bay: "where coho salmon are found" in Kwak'wala
- Chu Chua: the plural of the Secwepemc language word for "creek".
- Chuckwalla River: "short river" in Oowekyala. The nearby Kilbella River means "long river".
- Chukachida River
- Chutine River: "half-people" in either the Tlinkit or Tahltan languages. The area's population was half-Tlingit and half-Tahltan.
- Cinnemousun Narrows Provincial Park: From the Secwepemc language cium-moust-un, meaning "come and go back again", sometimes translated as "the bend" (i.e. in Shuswap Lake)
- Clayoquot Sound: an adaption of the Nuu-chah-nulth language Tla-o-qui-aht, which has a variety of translations: "other or different people", "other or strange house", "people who are different from what they used to be"; in Nitinaht the phrase translates as "people of the place where it becomes the same even when disturbed".
- Clo-oose: "campsite beach" in the Nitinaht dialect of Nuu-chah-nulth
- Clusko River: "mud river" in the Chilcotin language
- Cluxewe Mountain, Cluxewe River: "delta or sand bar" in Kwak'wala
- Coglistiko River: "stream coming from small jack-pine windfalls" in the Carrier language
- Colquitz River: "waterfall" in North Straits Salish
- Comiaken: "bare, devoid of vegetation" in Hulquminum
- Comaplix, British Columbia is a former mining town which was named after the Incomappleux River from the Lakes or Colville-Okanagan word nk'mapeleqs, meaning "point at end (of lake)".
- Comox: either from the Chinook Jargon for "dog" (kamuks), or from the Kwak'wala for "place of plenty".
- Conuma Peak: "high, rocky peak" in the Nuu-chah-nulth language
- Coqualeetza: "place of beating of blankets (to get them clean)" in Halqemeylem
- Coquihalla River, Coquihalla Mountain: "stingy container" (of fish) in Halqemeylem, a reference to black-coloured water spirits who would steal fish right off the spear
- Coquitlam: "small red salmon" in Halqemeylem (Upriver Halkomelem). Derived from the name of the Kwikwetlem people. Another and more usual translation is "stinking of fish slime" or "stinking fish", thought to be a reference to the Kwikwetlem people's role as slaves to the Katzie and Kwantlen as fish butchers.
- Cowichan: from Quwutsun, "land warmed by the sun" or "warm country" (Hulquminum)
- Cultus: "bad, of no value, worthless" in Chinook Jargon. In First Nations legend, this popular recreational lake south of Chilliwack was said to be inhabited by evil spirits.
- Cumshewa, Cumshewa Inlet, Cunshewa Head: Cumshewa was a prominent Haida chief in the late 18th century, noted for the killing of the crew of the US trading vessel Constitution in 1794. His name means "rich at the mouth" (of the river)" and was conferred from the language of the Heiltsuk, who were allies of the Cumshewa Haida.

==== D–J ====
- Destell Pass: "going to camp" in Tahltan.
- Dil-Dil Plateau, meaning unknown, probably Chilcotin language
- Ealue Lake: "sky fish" in Tahltan.
- Ecstall River: from the Tsimshian for "tributary" or "something from the side" (the Ecstall joins the Skeena River near Prince Rupert)
- Eddontenajon: "child crying in the water" or "a little boy drowned" in Tahltan
- Cape Edensaw: Edenshaw, in its modern spelling, remains an important name in modern Haida society, known mostly nowadays for the dynasty of famous carvers of that name, all descendants of the early 19th century chief of this name, one of the powerful chiefs of Masset
- Edziza, Mount and Edziza, Mount volcanic complex: named after the Edzertza family of the Tahltan people, who live nearby.
- Elaho River
- Endako Lake, Carrier language
- Esquimalt: North Straits Salish for "the place of gradually shoaling water". Derived from their word Es-whoy-malth.
- Euchuk Lake, Carrier language
- Fontas River: originally Fantasque's River, after the name of a chief of the Sekani people
- Gataga River, Gataga Lakes, Gataga Mountain, Gataga River, Gataga Ranges, derived from the Sekani name for the river Tadadzè' (Guzagi K'úgé)
- Gingolx, also sp. Kincolith, "Place of skulls" in the Nisga'a language
- Gunn Valley, from the name of a member of the Xeni Gwet'in of Nemaiah Valley who lived there, ganin.
- Hotnarko River
- Hozameen Range
- Hunlen Falls, from the name of a chief whose trapline was in the area of the falls
- Incomappleux River is from the Lakes or Colville-Okanagan word nk'mapeleqs, meaning "point at end (of lake)". The name of the former town of Comaplix and adjacent mountain and creek are derived from the name of the river.
- Inklin River
- Kinuseo Falls, from the Cree for "fish"

==== K–L ====
- Kadeya Creek: "go after" or "in search of" in the Tahltan.
- Kalamalka Lake
- Kamloops: anglicization of the Shuswap word Tk'emlups, meaning "where the rivers meet".
- Kasalka Range, Kasalka Butte, Kasalka Creek
- Kelowna: "ki?lawna?" meaning a male grizzly bear in the Okanagan language.
- Kemano, from the name of one of the subdivisions of the Henaksiala people, a subgroup of the Haisla
- Keremeos
- Khutzeymateen River, Khutzeymateen Provincial Park, Khutzeymateen Inlet, from "K'tzim-a-deen" (Tsimshian language)
- Kincolith – see Gingolx
- Kitimat – people of the snow
- Kitlope River, var. of Gitlope, the Tsimshian language name for the Gitlope, "people of the rocks", now amalgamated with the Gitamaat band as the Haisla First Nation.
- Kitselas, British Columbia, Kitselas Canyon, "people of the village in the canyon" in the Tsimshian language
- Kitsumkalum, British Columbia, Kitsumkalum River – "people of the riffles (in the shallow water" in the Tsimshian language.
- Klastline River: "confluence" or "junction of waters" in the Tahltan.
- Klemtu, from the Coast Tsimshian language "Klemdoo-oolk," meaning"impassable"
- Kluskus Lakes, Kluskus Hills, Kluskus
- Kootenay: derived from the proper name of the Kootenay people, Ktunaxa
- Kuyakuz Mountain, Kuyakuz Lake
- Kwadacha River "white water" in Sekani (indigenous spelling Kwàdàta or Kwodàch). The river contains high amounts of rock flour, so "white" is reference to the colour of the water, not to rapids.
  - Kwadacha Glacier
  - Kwadacha Mountain
  - Kwadacha Wilderness Provincial Park
  - Kwadacha, British Columbia (Fort Ware)
- Lakelse Lake, Lakelse Lake Provincial Park, Lakelse Hot Springs etc. from the Coast Tsimshian "LaxGyels"
- Kyuquot, British Columbia, Kyuquot Sound – from the name of the local group of Nuu-chah-nulth
- Lillooet: adapted from the proper name for the Lower St'at'imc people, the Lil'wat of Mt. Currie. Lil'wat means "wild onions". The old name of Lillooet was Cayoosh Flat (1858–1860), derived from the name of one of the streams converging into the Fraser at the town (cayoosh is the local variant of Chinook Jargon for "horse" or "Indian pony").

==== M–N ====
- Malahat
- Malakwa: from Chinook Jargon malakwa for "mosquito(s)" (from fr. le maringouin).
- Mamquam River
- Marktosis
- Masset – a Haida adaptation of a Spanish captain's name, possibly Masseta or Massetta
- Matsqui: ″stretch of higher ground″
- Mehatl Creek
- Mesilinka River
- Metchosin: English translation of Smets-Schosen, meaning "place of stinking fish"
- Metsantan Pass, Metsantan Range – "People of the Caribou Hide" in Kaska. Also the name of the former settlement of Metsantan, aka Caribou Hide, and of Metsantan Creek and Metsantan Lake
- Misinchinka River
- Mount Tzouhalem, after the Quamichan chief and warrior who was banished there.
- M^{q}uqʷin/Brooks Peninsula Provincial Park.
- Muskwa River, "bear" in the Cree language.
- Naglico Lake, Naglico Hills
- Nadina River, Nadina Mountain – the name of the river is derived from that of Nadina Mountain, which is near its source, the name of which means "standing up alone" in the Carrier language. The river's actual name in Carrier, not adopted by the geographical names board, is "Nadinako".
- Nahatlatch River, Nahatlatch Needle
- Nakina River
- Nakusp – from the Sinixt or Okanagan language word "Neqo'sp" meaning "closed-in" or "safe"
- Namu
- Nanaimo: Named after the Snuneymuxw people.
- Nanoose Bay
- Natalkuz Lake
- Nauwigewauk, New Brunswick: from the Wolastoqiyik (Maliseet) word "Nuhwig'ewauk", which is the Wolastoqey name for the Hammond River, possibly meaning "slow current."
- Nazko – "river flowing from the south" in Carrier
- Nechako River: An anglicization of [netʃa koh], its name in the indigenous Carrier language which means "big river".
- Nemaiah Valley, from Nemiah, name of the founding chief who moved there from Hanceville
- Nicolum River
- Nicoamen River, Nicoamen Plateau
- Nicolum River, Nicolum River Provincial Park
- Nicomekl River – Halq'emeylem for "the route to go" or "the pathway".
- Nicomen Island
- Nimpkish River, from the name of the 'Namgis, the Kwakwaka'wakw people whose territory this river is in.
- Nimpo Lake
- Nitinat Lake: from the usual English spelling of the name of the Ditidaht people
- Noaxe Lake, Noaxe Creek

==== O–Q ====
- Okanagan:
- Omineca River, Omineca Mountains, Omineca Country
- Ominicetla River
- Ootsa Lake
- Opitsaht
- Osilinka River
- Osoyoos: From suius in the Okanagan language, meaning "Narrowing of the waters"; the O- prefix was added by English speakers to harmonize with Okanagan and other O-placenames in the area such as Omak, Oroville and Oliver.
- Ospika River
- Pasayten River
- Penticton: "Place to stay forever" in Okanagan
- Popkum: "puffball mushrooms" in Halqemeylem
- Qualicum Beach, Qualicum River: "Where the dog salmon run" in Comox
- Quanchus Range
- Quatsino Sound, Quatsino Provincial Park, Quatsino, British Columbia, from Gwat'sinux, the name of the local group of Kwakwaka'wakw people.
- Quispamsis, New Brunswick: From "qospemsis" in the Wolastoqiyik (Maliseet) word, meaning "Little lake in the woods", the lake being present-day Ritchie Lake.

==== S ====
- Saanich: from WSANEC, the name of one of the local Straits Salish peoples and their language.
- Sechelt: the town is named after the shíshálh people of the region
- Sezill Creek: "it is hot" in the Tahltan.
- Shalalth: From Ts'alalh, "the lake" in the St'at'imcets language of the Lillooet people
- Shulaps Range, Shulaps Peak: "ram of the mountain sheep" in the Chilcotin language.
- Sicamous – "river circling mountains" in the Shuswap language.
- Sikanni Chief River
- Siska – from sisqa, Thompson language (Nlaka'pamux) for "uncle"
- Sisqa Peak – "uncle"
- Skaha Lake: from the Okanagan language word for "dog" (sqexe). Skaha Lake in frontier times was often called Dog Lake, although that is the Shuswap language meaning of skaha; in the Okanagan language it means "horse" or "pony".
- Skaist Mountain, Skaist River
- Skeena River – from "X'san", Tsimshian (Gitksan) for "River of Mist"
- Skihist Mountain and Skihist Provincial Park
- Skidegate
- Skookumchuck: "strong (skookum) ocean/water (chuck); that is: "strong tide, strong ocean current, rapids" in Chinook Jargon (three different locations – Sechelt Inlet, Lillooet River, Columbia River/East Kootenay, though also has a general meaning of a tidal rapids, usually at the mouth of an inlet).
- Similkameen: From "Similkameugh" or "Samilkameigh" or "Samilkumeigh" meaning "white swan", one of the twelve tribes of the Okanagan people. The "-meen" ending was "forced by the whites" on this name to harmonize with the name of the river's tributary, the Tulameen.
- Slocan and Slocan River: Slhu?kin Meaning "speared in the head" in the Lakes dialect of the Colville-Okanagan language and in reference to the traditional method of spear fishing in the region with a three pronged fish spear, a "lhumin."
- Sloko River
- Somass River
- Sooke: named after the T'Souke people who live in the area
- Spallumcheen
- Spatsizi River and associated placenames
- Spillimacheen River, Spillimacheen
- Spuzzum, from the local variant of the Chinook Jargon spatsum, a reed used in basketry
- Squamish and Squamish River: The river and the town are named after the Squamish people who live in the area
- Stein River: Adjacent to Lytton BC, "Stein" is an adaptation of the Nlaka'pamux (Thompson) staygn – "hidden place".
- Stellako River, Stellako
- Stikine River and associated placenames. From Shta-KEEN, "great river" in the Tlingit language
- Sumallo River
- Sumas Lake, Sumas River, Sumas Mountain, and the old District of Sumas (now part of Abbotsford): from a Halqemeylem language word for ""a big level opening"

==== T ====
- Taghum, British Columbia, taghum is the Chinook Jargon word for "six" (Taghum is six miles from Nelson)
- Tagish Lake, Tagish Highland – "fish trap" or "it (spring ice) is breaking up" in the Tagish language
- Tahltan, Tahltan River, Little Tahltan River, Tahltan Highland, a Tlingit language word for "something heavy in the water" (i.e. salmon), originally applied to the settlement, extended from there to become the name of the Tahltan people
- Tahsis
- Tahtsa Lake, Tahtsa Peak, Tahtsa Ranges
- Talchako River, Talchako Pass
- Takla Lake, Takla Landing
- Taku River, Taku Plateau and the Taku Arm of Tagish Lake from the name of the Taku people
- Talchako River
- Tanzilla River, Tanzilla Plateau
- Taseko Mountain, Taseko River, Taseko Lakes – from the Chilcotin language "Desiqox", which means "Mosquito River".
- Tatla Lake
- Tatlatui Provincial Park, Tatlatui Lake, Tatlatui Peak
- Tatlayoko Lake
- Taweh Creek: "mountain goat" in the Tagish.
- Tchaikazan River, from the Chilcotin language name for a peak visible from its valley, Ts^icheza'on.
- Teslin Lake and Teslin, British Columbia, from the name of the local group of Inland Tlinkit
- Tochquonyalla Range
- Toodoggone River, originally "Thudegade" and from the Kaska language Tuhfa Ughane meaning "Two Brothers River" or "eagles nest"
- Tsʼilʔos Provincial Park, also Tsʼilʔos, Tsʼylos, Tsʼyl-os, Tsoloss, the Chilcotin language name for Mount Tatlow
- Tulameen: Nlaka'pamux (Thompson) language for "red earth", a reference to the ochre found here.
- Tuya River, Tuya Lake, Tuya Range, Little Tuya River
- Tsawwassen: "Looking toward the sea" in North Straits Salish
- Tyoax Pass, at the head of Tyaughton Creek (see next)
- Tyaughton Lake, Tyaughton Creek (also Tyoax, Tyax), from the Chilcotin language for "jumping fish"
- Tyhee Lake Provincial Park: Tyhee is a variant of the usual Chinook Jargon tyee – "chief, big, great, important, boss"

==== U–Z ====
- Ucluelet: "people of the safe harbour" in the language of the Nuu-chah-nulth.
- Unuk River
- Wannock River, "poison" in Wuikyala
- Wapiti River
- Whonnock, Whonnock Lake, Whonnock Creek: from honnock, "humpback salmon" in Halqemeylem, the only variety of salmon to spawn in Whonnock Creek.
- Yalakom River, Yalakom Mountain: "ewe of the mountain sheep" in the Chilcotin language
- Yohetta Valley, Yohetta Creek, Yohetta Lake, from the Tsilhqot'in language yuyetabin [where bin means lake]
- Yoho National Park – "Yoho" means "how amazing" or "it is beautiful"
- Yuquot, the Nuu-chah-nulth language name, meaning "winds come from all directions", for the village usually known in English as Friendly Cove, on Nootka Sound
- Zagoddetchino Mountain
- Zus Mountain
- Zymoetz River

=== Manitoba ===
- Amiku: From the Ojibwe word "Amiik," meaning "beaver"
- Grand Rapids: Translation of Cree word misepawistik, meaning "rushing rapids"
- Manitou a common indigenous name, has origins from the Algonquin people, meaning "mysterious being" in their native Algonquin language
- Miniota: from the Sioux translation that means "Much Water"
- Minnedosa: A Sioux that translates to "Flowing Water", Named after Minnedosa Lake and Little Saskatchewan River, for its abundance of water
- Neepawa: from the Cree word for "Plenty", or "Abundance"
- Pinawa: a name from the Natives, meaning "calm waters", because of the channels waters when the first explorers arrived
- Puktawagan: a Cree word for "Fishing Place" or "Fishing Net"
- The Pas: From French Le Pas, a shortening of Fort Pascoyac, from the Pasquia River, named for the Opaskwayak Cree Nation
- Wapusk National Park: from wâpask, "polar bear" in the Cree language
- Waskada: from the Sioux expression "Wa-Sta-Daow", meaning "better further on" which was named by the early settlers of Waskada saying they better move on and not settle there
- Wawanesa: May come from the word "Waa'oonesii" or "Whip-Poor-Will" in the Ojibwe language
- Winnipeg: "muddy water" from the word win-nipi of the Cree

=== New Brunswick ===
- Apohaqui – translated from the Maliseet language, and means "The joining of two waters" or "the joining of two rivers". (Apohaqui is where the Millstream and the Kennebecasis River join.)
- Aroostook
- Bouctouche: a corruption of the Mi'kmaq word Chebooktoosk, meaning Great Little Harbour.
- Caraquet: Derived from the Mi'kmaq language, meaning "junction (or meeting) of two rivers".
- Escuminac
- Kennebecasis River
- Kouchibouguac National Park (and River): Kouchibouguac means "river of the long tides" in Mi'kmaq.
- Magaguadavic Lake, a Mi'kmaq word meaning "lake of eels".
- Mactaquac, a Maliseet word meaning "big branch".
- Manawagonish Island
- Meductic : derived from the Maliseet word "Medoctic", meaning "the end".
- Meduxnekeag
- Miramichi : the name, which may be the oldest recorded name of aboriginal origin in Canada, may come from the Montagnais word for "country of the Micmac."
- Nackawic, which gets its name from the Maliseet word meaning "straight" or "not in the direction it seems to be", alluding to the illusion created at the intersection of the Nackawic Stream and the Saint John River.
- Nashwaak River : a corruption of the Maliseet word for slow current.
- Nashwaaksis
- Nauwigewauk :probably means babbling brook
- Oromocto : possibly from the Maliseet word welamooktook which means "good river"
- Penniac, meaning "fork in the river".
- Penobsquis is a blend of Micmac terms for stone and brook.
- Petitcodiac – term is derived from a Mi'kmaq word meaning "bends like a bow" (contradicts the popular belief that the name derived from the French term "petit coude", meaning "little elbow")
- Pokiok
- Quispamsis – translated from the Maliseet language and means, "little lake in the woods" (i.e., Ritchie Lake)
- Shiketehauk River
- Temisquata Lake
- Washademoak Lake
- Woolastook (alternately 'Wolastoq'): Maliseet word meaning 'good and bountiful river': the Saint John River

=== Newfoundland and Labrador ===
- Aguathuna: possibly derives from the Beothuk aguathoonet or aquathoont, "grindstone", imposed perhaps in the mistaken belief that it meant "white rock" for the limestone abundant in the area
- Ashuanipi Lake
- Kaipokok Bay: from Inuktitut, meaning "frothy water"
- Ktaqmkuk: Land over the water from Mi'kmaq language "Newfoundland"
- Makkovik: Vik is the Inuktitut word for "place". Makko- may have one of the following origins:
1. it may be a corruption of the name Maarcoux, after Pierre Marcoux, a French trader in Labrador in the late 18th century ; or
2. from the Inuktitut maggok, "two"; thus Makkovik would mean "two places". Around Makkovik are two inlets, Makkovik Bay and Makkovik harbour, and two main brooks floating into the two inlets. "Two Buchten Machovik", meaning "two bays Makkovik", is mentioned in a 1775 writing by the German Moravian missionary Johann Ludwig Beck.
- Natuashish: from Innu-aimun, meaning "a small lake".
- Nunatsiavut: from Inuktitut, meaning "our beautiful land"
- Shannoc Brook: Joseph Beete Jukes, the Geological Surveyor of Newfoundland in 1839–1840, believed that Shannoc Brook, a tributary of the Exploits River, was given the Beothuk name for the Mi'kmaq.
- Sheshatshiu: from Innu-aimun, meaning "a narrow place in the river".
- Torngat Mountains: from the Inuktitut name for the region, turngait, meaning "spirits"; Inuit legends hold that here the spirit and physical worlds overlap.
- Wabana – from the Abenaki wabunaki, "east land" from wabun "dawn"; so named in 1895 by Colonel Thomas Cantley, president of the Nova Scotia Steel Company
- Wabush – from Innu-aimun uapush, "Arctic hare"

=== Nova Scotia ===
- Antigonish: Derived from the Mi'kmaq word nalegitkoonechk, meaning "where branches are torn off".
- Baddeck
- Chebucto (the original name of Halifax and the Halifax Harbour): Derived from the Mi'kmaq word "Jipugtug", meaning "the biggest harbour".
- Cobequid: Derived from the Mi'kmaq word "Wakobetgitk", meaning "end of the rushing or flowing water".
- Eskasoni: Derived from the Mi'kmaq word We'kwistoqnik, meaning "Where the fir trees are plentiful".
- Kejimkujik National Park: "Kejimkujik" has been translated as meaning "attempting to escape" or "swollen waters", but the park's official translation means "tired muscles".
- Malagash
- Merigomish
- Mushaboom
- Musquodoboit Harbour: foaming to the sea. The name is an anglicized version of the Mi’kmaq word Moosekudoboogwek.
- Nictaux, Nova Scotia, meaning unknown
- Pictou: Derived from the Mi'kmaq word "Piktook", meaning "an explosion of gas".
- Pugwash: Derived from the Mi'kmaq word "pagwe’ak", meaning "deep water".
- Shubenacadie:Derived from the Mi'kmaq word Shubenacadie (or Segubunakade) means "abounding in ground nuts" or "place where the red potato grows.
- Stewiacke: Derived from the Mi'kmaq language, meaning "flowing out in small streams" and "whimpering or whining as it goes".
- Tatamagouche: Derived from the Mi'kmaq word takumegooch, meaning "meeting of the waters".
- Tracadie
- Wagmatcook
- Whycocomagh:Derived from a Mi'kmaq word which means "Head of the Waters".

=== Northwest Territories ===
- Aulavik National Park, Aulavik means "place where people travel" in Inuvialuktun
- Naats'ihch'oh National Park Reserve, Naats'ihch'oh means "stands like a porcupine" in the Dene Suline language
- Nahanni National Park Reserve and South Nahanni River, from Nahani meaning "People over there far away" in the Dene language
- Pingo Canadian Landmark, from Pingo an Inuvialuktun word for "small hill"
- Sambaa K'e, "place of trout" in South Slavey
- Slave River, thought to come from the Athabaskan Deh Gah Got'ine, the name for the Slavey group of the Dene First Nations
- Thaydene Nene National Park, Thaydene Nene meaning "land of our ancestors" in the Dene language
- Tuktut Nogait National Park, Tuktut Nurrait means "young caribous" in Inuvialuktun

=== Nunavut ===
- Auyuittuq National Park – Auyuittuq means "the land that never melts".
- Iqaluit: "many fish" in Inuktitut.
- Pangnirtung is derived from Pangniqtuuq: "the place of many bull caribou"
- Quttinirpaaq National Park – Qutsiniqpaaq/Quttiniqpaaq means "top of the world" in Inuktitut and Quttiniqpaaq in Inuinnaqtun.
- Sirmilik National Park – Sirmilik means "the place of glaciers" in Inuktitut and Hirmilik in Inuinnaqtun.
- Ukkusiksalik National Park – Ukkusiksalik means "place of have cooking pots" in Inuktitut and Utkuhikhalik in Inuinnaqtun/Natsilik/Kivalliq.

=== Ontario ===
- Adjala-Tosorontio:Tosorontio is derived from the Huron (Wyandot) word meaning "beautiful mountain", and Adjala was the name of the wife of Chief Tecumseh.
- Algonquin Provincial Park: Named after the Algonquin (Anishinaabeg) people of Ontario.
- Almaguin Highlands: Derived from the words Algonquin and Magnetawan.
- Assiginack
- Algoma District
- Atikokan: Ojibwe for "caribou bones."
- Attawapiskat: "People of the parting of the rocks" from the Swampy Cree (Omushkegowuk) chat-a-wa-pis-shkag.
- Brantford: Named after Joseph Brant, a Mohawk leader.
- Cataraqui River
- Cayuga: Named for the Cayuga people of Ontario.
- Chinguacousy
- Consecon: reportedly (see Squire’s Site archaeological dig, Consecon Lake) derived from either or some combination of ‘lake of many pickerel/fish’ (con ho con) or, according to Rev Bowen P. Squire, ‘water opening’ (Khan ho Kharon); however, according to an Anishinaabe elder, the name in Ojibwemowin means ‘waters overtaking’
- Couchiching: Derived from the Ojibwe gojijiing, meaning "inlet."
- Deseronto: Named for Captain John Deseronto, a native Mohawk leader who was a captain in the British Military Forces during the American Revolutionary War.
- Eramosa: Thought to be derived from the word un-ne-mo-sah (possibly meaning "black dog", "dead dog", or simply "dog").
- Esquesing Township: Mississauga Anishinaabe word ishkwessin, meaning "that which lies at the end", which was the original name for Bronte Creek.
- Etobicoke: "The place where the alders grow" from the word wadoopikaang in the Ojibwe language.
- Fort Erie: Iroquoian, erige, meaning "cat".
- Gananoque: Origin unknown, thought to be derived from Native languages for "place of health" or "meeting place" or "water running over rocks."
- Garafraxa: Possibly derived from the word for "panther country".
- Iroquois Falls: Named for the Iroquois people of Ontario.
- Kakabeka Falls: From the Ojibwe word gakaabikaa, "waterfall over a cliff".
- Kaministiquia River: Derived from gaa-ministigweyaa, an Ojibwe word meaning "(river) with islands".
- Kanata: Mohawk word meaning "village" or "settlement."
- Kapuskasing: Of Cree origin, possibly meaning "bend in river."
- Kawartha Lakes: An Anglicization of the word ka-wa-tha (from ka-wa-tae-gum-maug or gaa-waategamaag), a word coined in 1895 by Martha Whetung of the Curve Lake First Nation, meaning "land of reflections" in the Anishinaabe language. The word was subsequently changed by tourism promoters to Kawartha, with the meaning "bright waters and happy lands."
- Keewatin: Algonquian for "north wind." Derived from either kīwēhtin in Cree or giiwedin in Ojibwe.
- Madawaska: Named after an Algonquian band of the region known as Matouweskarini, meaning "people of the shallows".
- Magnetawan: Derived from the word for "swiftly flowing river."
- Manitoulin Island: "Manidoo Minis", Spirit Island. Manitoulin is the English version, via French, of the Old Odawa name Manidoowaaling, which means "cave of the spirit".
- Manitouwadge: From manidoowaazh in Ojibwe, meaning "cave of the spirit."
- Manitowaning: Manidoowaanhning, place of the spirit's den
- Manotick: Derived from Algonquin for "island."
- Matachewan
- Matawatchan
- Mattawa: "Meeting of the waters" in Ojibwe.
- M'Chigeeng
- Michipicoten: "Big bluffs" in Ojibwe.
- Missinaibi Provincial Park: Cree for "pictured waters," thought to refer to the pictographs found on rock faces along the river.
- Mississauga: Named for the native tribe of the Mississaugas
- Mississippi Mills: May originate from Mazinaa[bikinigan]-ziibi, Algonquian for "[painted] image river", referring to the pictographs found on Mazinaw Lake.
- Moosonee: Derived from the Cree word moosoneek, meaning "at the Moose (River)".
- Muskoka: Named for a First Nations chief of the 1850s, Chief Yellowhead or Mesqua Ukie.
- Napanee
- Nassagaweya: Derived from the Mississauga word nazhesahgewayyong, meaning "river with two outlets."
- Neebing
- Niagara: Iroquois in origin, meaning uncertain.
- Nipigon: May have originated from the Ojibwe word animbiigoong, meaning "at continuous water" or "at waters that extend [over the horizon]."
- Nipissing: From the Anishinaabe term nibiishing, meaning "at (some) water".
- Nottawasaga River: Derived from the Algonquin words for "Iroquois" and "river outlet".
- Ohsweken
- Oneida Nation of the Thames
- Onondaga
- Ontario
- Opasatika, "river lined with poplars".
- Opeongo, derived from the Algonquin word opeauwingauk meaning “sandy narrows”.
- Oshawa: from the Ojibwe term aazhaway, meaning "crossing to the other side of a river or lake" or just "(a)cross".
- Otonabee: From the Ojibwe term "Odoonabii-ziibi" (Tullibee River). Otonabee comes from the words ode which means "heart" and odemgat that comes from "boiling water". It translates into "the river that beats like a heart in reference to the bubbling and boiling water of the rapids along the river"
- Ottawa: "To buy" from the word adaawe in the Anishinaabe language; adapted as the name of the Odawa people.
- Penetanguishene: believed to come from either the Wyandot language or from the Abenaki language via the Ojibwa language, meaning "land of the white rolling sands".
- Petawawa: From Algonquin meaning "where one hears the noise of the water"
- Powassan: From the word for "bend."
- Pukaskwa National Park
- Saugeen: Ojibwa language, Zaagiing, meaning outlet
- Shawanaga
- Scugog: Derived from the Mississauga word sigaog, which means "waves leap over a canoe."
- Shuniah: named after the Ojibwa word "zhooniyaa" for "money" or "silver"
- Sioux Narrows
- Sioux Lookout
- Tecumseh
- Tehkummah
- Temagami: from the Anishinaabe word dimiigami, "deep water(s)".
- Timiskaming: from the Algonquin language Temikami or Temikaming, meaning "deep waters".
- Toronto: from an Iroquoian language, but of uncertain derivation. Another story says it is derived from the Mohawk word "tkaronto" meaning "trees standing in the water".
- Tuscarora
- Tyendinaga: Derived from a variant spelling of Mohawk leader Joseph Brant's traditional Mohawk name, Thayendanegea.
- Wahnapitae: from the Anishinaabe waanabide, "be shaped like a hollow tooth".
- Waupoos: Ojibway for "rabbit"
- Wasaga Beach: Derived from "Nottawasaga," as above.
- Wawa
- Wawanosh
- Wikwemikong: from the Anishinaabe Wiikwemkoong, "Bay of Beavers" from Anishinaabe word "Amik" meaning beaver.
- Wyoming: derived from the Munsee name xwé:wamənk, meaning "at the big river flat."

=== Prince Edward Island ===
- Bedeque and Bedeque Bay: cognate with Baddeck, Nova Scotia

=== Quebec ===
- Abitibi
- Aguanish
- Ahuntsic district of Montreal
- Akpatok Island Akpaqtuq means "come down or lowers itself" in Inuktitut
- Amqui
- Arthabaska (and County)
- Réservoir Cabonga
- Réservoir Caniapiscau, and (River, Hunting camp, Regional county municipality)
- Causapscal: Derived from the Mi'kmaq language, meaning "stony bottom", "swift water", or "rocky point".
- Chibougamau or Chibouagmou:
- Chicoutimi: "End of the deep water" in Innu or Cree.
- Coaticook: Derived from the Abenaki language, meaning "river near the pines".
- Donnacona: Named after Chief Donnacona, 16th century Iroquoian Chief of Stadacona.
- Lac-Etchemin (and town)
- Gaspé (also County, Peninsula, and Cape): "land's end" in Mi'kmaq.
- Inukjuak Inugjuaq or Inujjuaq means "The Giant/Big Man" in Inuktitut
- Kahnawake
- Kamouraska County: Derived from the Abenaki language, meaning "birch bark here".
- Kangiqsualujjuaq Kangiqsualujjuaq means "the very large bay" in Inuktitut
- Kanesatake
- Kawawachikamach, Naskapi Nation, Quebec
- Lac Kénogami: Kenogami means "long water" in Montagnais.
- Rivière Koksoak Quqsuaq means "Yellowish" in Inuktitut
- Kuujjuaq Kuujjuaq means "the great river" in Inuktitut
- Lac Manitou: Derived from the Algonquian name Gitchi Manitou, which in their culture describes their Creator (the Great Spirit).
- Magog: Derived from "Memphremagog", see Lake Memphremagog below.
- Manicouagan River: "where there is bark"
- Maniwaki
- Mascouche
- Mashteuiatsh
- Maskinongé (and County)
- Matane
- Matane County
- Matapédia County
- Réservoir and Rivière Matawin
- Mégantic County (also Lake): Abenaki for "lake trout place".
- Lac Memphremagog: Meaning "beautiful waters" or "vast expanse of water" in Abenaki.
- Missisquoi County: Missisquoi is an Abenaki tribal name.
- Nastapoka Islands
- Oka
- Paspébiac
- Pohenegamook
- Pontiac County: Name of the famous 18th-century Ottawa leader Pontiac.
- Quebec City (and County, and Province): The "narrowing of the river" refers to the point where the St. Lawrence River passes Quebec City.
- Rimouski (and County)
- Saguenay
- Salluit Salluit means "the thin ones" in Inuktitut
- Sayabec
- Shawinigan: "Portage at the crest" in Algonquian.
- Squatec
- Tadoussac
- Temiscamingue County
- Témiscouata County: Abenaki for "bottomless" or "extremely deep all around".
- Torngat Mountains Tuurngat means "Spirits or sometimes Evils" in Inuktitut
- Yamachiche
- Yamaska County

=== Saskatchewan ===
- Assiniboia: Derived from the name of the Assiniboine First Nation people.
- Iskwao Creek, Cree for woman
- Kamsack: From a First Nation word meaning something vast and large.
- Katepwa: Likely derived from the Cree word Kahtapwao meaning What is calling?.
- Kenosee Lake: based on the Cree word kinosew (ᑭᓄᓭᐤ) meaning fish.
- kikiskitotawânawak iskwêwak Lakes, Cree for we honour the women
- Kinistino: It has been suggested that the word Kinistino is equivalent to running water in Cree. This has not been able to be verified.
- Lake Athabasca: From Woods Cree: aðapaskāw, [where] there are plants one after another.
- Manitou Beach: Derived from Aasha Monetoo, a name for the Great Spirit.
- Ministikwan Lake Cree Nation: From Cree meaning it is an island.
- Mistusinne: Derived from the Plains Cree word mistasiniy meaning big stone which resembled a sleeping bison.
- Moosomin From the Cree word for the mooseberry or high bush cranberry.
- Nipawin: Derived from the Cree word meaning a bed, or resting place which referred to a low-lying area along the river now flooded by Codette Lake.
- Nokomis: Named for Hiawatha's grandmother in Longfellow's epic poem, chosen in 1906 by postmistress Florence Mary Halstead.
- Ogema: "Omega" is Greek for "end", being "the end of the rail-line". Two communities had the same name, so two letters were switched to become "Ogema". Ogema is an Anishinaabemowin word meaning Chief.
- Piapot: Named for Chief Piapot, meaning Hole in the Sioux or One Who Knows the Secrets of the Sioux.
- Saskatoon: Derived from the Cree word misāskwatōmin, meaning Saskatoon berry – a fruit native to the area.
- Sintaluta: The name comes from a Lakota word meaning tail of the red fox.
- Wadena: Named after Wadena, Minnesota, the origin of some early settlers of American descent, which was named after Chief Wadena, an Ojibwe Chief.
- Wakaw: A Cree word meaning crooked, referring to nearby Wakaw Lake.
- Wapella: Meaning either water underground or gently falling snow, where wape means to snow in Dakota.
- Waskesiu: From the Cree word meaning red deer or elk. (Also resort town of Waskesiu Lake)
- Wawota: From the Dakota words wa ota, which means much snow. Wa means snow, oda or ota means lots.

=== Yukon ===
- Aishihik Lake and Aishihik River: meaning "tail hanging down" in Southern Tutchone
- Alsek River
- Dezadeash Lake
- Ivvavik National Park: Ivavik means "birthplace" or "nursery" in Inuvialuktun
- Klondike and Klondike River: Derived from the Hän language word for hammer stones used to fix salmon nets (Tr'ondëk).
- Kluane Lake and Kluane National Park and Reserve: from Łù'àn meaning big fish in Southern Tutchone
- Klukshu and Klukshu River
- Kusawa Lake
- Nisutlin River
- Tagish Lake and Tagish, Yukon: from the name of the language and people (Tagish Kwan)
- Takhini River
- Tatshenshini River
- Teslin Lake, Teslin River and Teslin, Yukon: from the Tlingit Deisleen, long narrow water
- Vuntut National Park

== See also ==
- Indigenous mapping
- List of English words from indigenous languages of the Americas
- List of placenames of indigenous origin in the Americas
- List of place names in New England of aboriginal origin
- List of Indian reserves in Canada
- List of Indian reserves in Canada by population
- List of First Nations band governments
- List of First Nations peoples
- Classification of indigenous peoples of the Americas
- List of Chinook Jargon place names

== Resources ==
- The composition of Indian geographical names, illustrated from the Algonkin languages, Trumbull, J. Hammond (James Hammond), 1821–1897. [Hartford, Conn.? : s.n., 187–?]
- http://www.arcticplacenames.ca
