= Taseko =

Taseko may refer to several things in British Columbia, Canada:

- Taseko Lakes, a pair of lakes
- Taseko Mines, a copper mining company
- Taseko Mountain
- Taseko River

== See also ==
- Chilko Lake, officially known as Tŝilhqox Biny, a lake in British Columbia
