= Mount Vic =

Mountain in British Columbia, Canada

Coordinates: 51°12′30″N 123°18′29″W

Highest point
- Elevation: 3,005 m (9,859 ft)
- Prominence: 712 m (2,336 ft)

Naming
- Native name: Tŝi Nadilʔah (Chilcotin)

Mount Vic is a mountain in the Chilcotin Ranges of the Central Interior of British Columbia, Canada, located east of the southernmost of the Taseko Lakes and southeast of Taseko Mountain. Adjoining its lower slopes to the northeast is the Dil-Dil Plateau, a lava plateau rising above the main Chilcotin Plateau, which extends north and northeast in general from this area, which is to the west of the headwaters of Big Creek. Mount Vic is one of the highest summits of the southern Chilcotin Ranges, which are a subrange of the Pacific Ranges subdivision of the Coast Mountains.

== See also ==
- Big Creek Provincial Park
- Spruce Lake Protected Area
