= Gunn Valley =

Valley in British Columbia, Canada

Coordinates: 51°15′36″N 123°41′23″W

Gunn Valley is a valley in the southern Chilcotin District of the Central Interior of British Columbia, Canada, just west of the Taseko Lakes and, like them, running on a north–south axis and at a perpendicular angle to Yohetta Valley, which drains to it via Yohetta Creek but also connects through a low pass to Chilko Lake farther west. In Gunn Valley are Tuzcha and Fishem Lakes, which are fed and drained by Yohetta Creek, which joins the Tchaikazan River at the valley's southern end. Lastman Lake is at the valley's north end and is connected to the other lakes by a swampy pass, through which runs the access road to Yohetta Valley. There is an airstrip near the valley's southern end.

== Name origin ==
The valley's name is not derived from the Scots-Norwegian surname Gunn, but from the name of a member of the Xeni Gwet'in people of Nemaiah Valley, which is nearby to the north, whose name was ganin (meaning not provided).
