= Taylor Pass =

Taylor Pass may be one of the following:

== Mountain passes ==
- Taylor Pass (Alberta) – a pass in Banff National Park, Alberta, Canada
- Taylor Pass (British Columbia) – a pass in the Chilcotin Ranges of British Columbia, Canada
- Taylor Pass (Arizona) – a pass in Graham County, Arizona, United States
- Taylor Pass (Colorado) – a pass in the Elk Mountains of Colorado, United States

== Waterways ==
- Taylor Pass (Louisiana) – a river channel in Louisiana, United States
