= Mount Tatlow =

Mountain in British Columbia, Canada

Tŝ’ilʔoŝ
- Mount Tatlow
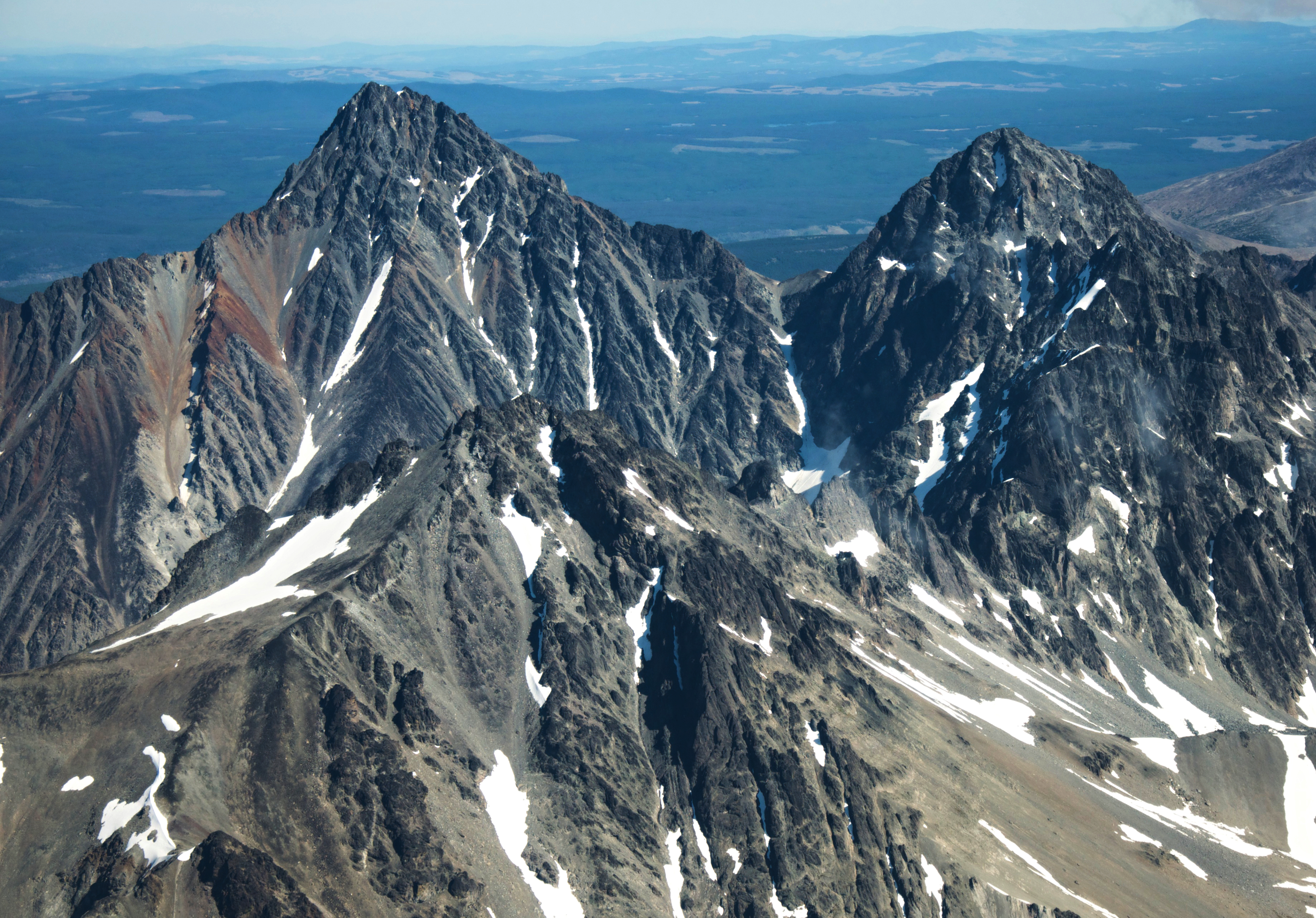
- Tŝ’ilʔoŝ aerial, west aspect

Highest point
- Elevation: 3,063 m (10,049 ft)
- Prominence: 1,613 m (5,292 ft)
- Parent peak: Altruist Mountain (3064 m)
- Listing: Mountains of British Columbia; Canada highest major peaks 64th; Canada prominent peaks 101st
- Coordinates: 51°23′03″N 123°51′51″W

Naming
- Native name: Tŝ’ilʔoŝ (Chilcotin)
- Pronunciation: sigh-loss

Geography
- Location within British Columbia
- Interactive map of Tŝ’ilʔoŝ
- Location: Central Interior of British Columbia, Canada
- Parent range: Chilcotin Ranges
- Topo map: NTS 92P5 Jesmond

Tŝ’ilʔoŝ, also known as Mount Tatlow, is one of the principal summits of the Chilcotin Ranges subdivision of the Pacific Ranges of the Coast Mountains of southern British Columbia. Standing on an isolated ridge between the lower end of Chilko Lake and the Taseko Lakes, it is 3,063 m (10,049 ft) in elevation.

Southeast across the Taseko Lakes is Taseko Mountain 3,063 m (10,049 ft), the highest summit between those lakes and the Fraser River, while directly south beyond Yohetta Valley (a deep valley which connects the relative lowlands around Chilko and Taseko Lakes is the massif containing Monmouth Mountain 3,182 m (10,440 ft). Southwest across Chilko Lake is Mount Good Hope 3,242 m (10,636 ft) and due west, also across Chilko Lake, is Mount Queen Bess 3,298 m (10,820 ft), the highest peak east of the Homathko River before the Waddington Range massif, which is at the core of the range and contains Mount Waddington 4,016 m (13,176 ft).

== Name ==
The name Mount Tatlow was officially adopted on 26 June 1911, as submitted on 23 June 1910 by Sidney Williams, and on 11 March 2019, the official name became Tŝ'ilʔoŝ as recommended by Tŝilhqot’in National Government and supported by the Cariboo Regional District, BC Parks, Avalanche Canada, and Recreation Sites and Trails.

Tŝ’ilʔoŝ (tsyle-oss, the 'ʔ' represents a glottal stop) is the traditional name in the language of the Tsilhqot'in people whose territory is in the area of the lakes and the plateau to their north, and has given its name to Tsʼilʔos Provincial Park which encompasses this area. Native tradition holds that it is unlucky to point at Tŝ’ilʔoŝ, or to mention its name in casual speech; adverse weather and worse may result. The Xeni Gwet'in people, who reside in Nemaia Valley near Tŝ’ilʔoŝ, request that NO climbing of it and its neighbouring summits take place, and BC Parks imposes those rules in its land-use guidelines on the area.

== Gallery ==
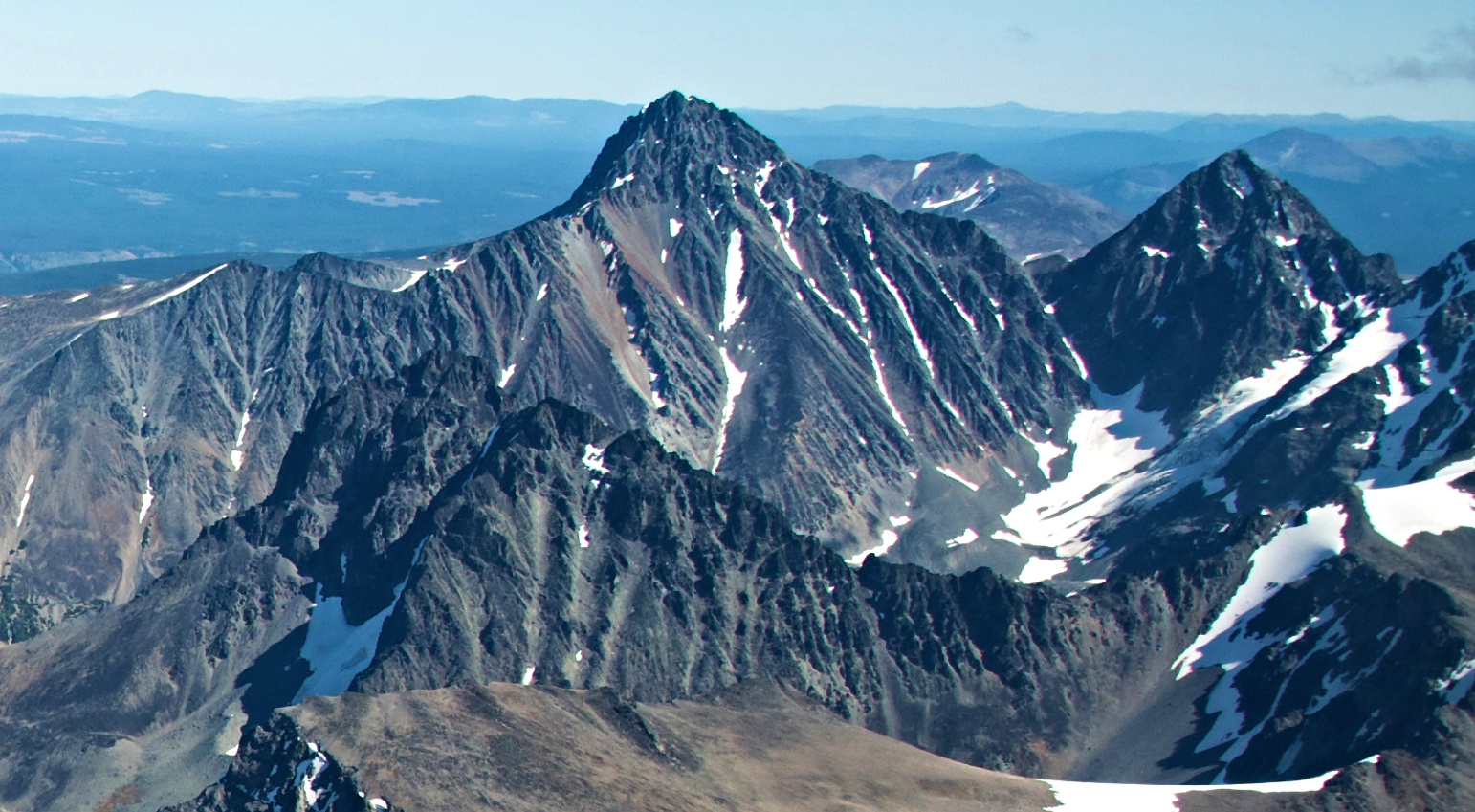
Aerial from west

== See also ==
- Mountain peaks of Canada
- Mountain peaks of North America
- Tsʼilʔos Provincial Park
- Geography of British Columbia
