= Taseko River =

River in British Columbia, Canada

- Native name: Dasiqox (Chilcotin)

Location
- Country: Canada
- Province: British Columbia
- District: Cariboo Land District

Physical characteristics
- Source: Taylor Pass
  - coordinates: 51°0′4″N 123°16′17″W
  - elevation: 2,085 m (6,841 ft)
- Mouth: Chilko River
  - coordinates: 52°0′26″N 123°40′39″W
  - elevation: 805 m (2,641 ft)
- Discharge
  - location: outlet of Taseko Lakes
  - average: 37.2 m^{3}/s (1,310 cu ft/s)
  - minimum: 2.99 m^{3}/s (106 cu ft/s)
  - maximum: 241 m^{3}/s (8,500 cu ft/s)

Basin features
- Tributaries
  - left: Lord River, Tchaikazan River

The Taseko River /təˈsiːkoʊ/ or Dasiqox in the original Chilcotin, is a tributary of British Columbia's Chilko River, a tributary of the Chilcotin River which joins the Fraser near the city of Williams Lake.

The Taseko has its origins at Taylor Pass in the heart of an alpine area known as the South Chilcotin. Taylor Pass connects with Slim Creek, a major tributary of Gun Creek, which feeds the Bridge River via Carpenter Lake. From its source, it flows north then northwest before entering the south end of Upper Taseko Lake next to the Lord River, one of its major tributaries. The Tchaikazan River, another large tributary, also joins the river via the Taseko Lakes, entering at the area that separates Upper and Lower Taseko Lake. At the outlet of the two Taseko Lakes the river issues onto the broad Chilcotin Plateau. From source to Upper Taseko Lake, the Taseko is about 30 kilometres in length. From Lower Taseko Lake to the Taseko's confluence with the Chilko River is about 85 kilometres. Including the 25 kilometre length of both Taseko Lakes, the total length of the Taseko River is around 140 kilometres.

A proposed but temporarily shelved hydroelectric proposal would dam and divert the Taseko Lakes and divert the Taseko's flow into Chilko Lake, from where another diversion would take the combined flow of the Chilko and Taseko Rivers and feed it into the coastal drainage of the Homathko River at Tatlayoko Lake, which would also be dammed. Further dams in the Homathko's Great Canyon are part of the proposal, which would flood key historic sites related to the Chilcotin War of 1864.

== Name origin ==
Taseko derives from the Chilcotin language "Dasiqox", which means "Mosquito River". The Taseko Lakes in that same language as "Dasiqox Biny", where "Biny" means lake and is a reference in the singular.

== Tributaries ==
=== Upper reaches ===
- Granite Creek
- Powell Creek

=== Taseko Lakes ===
- Lord River
- Tchaikazan River

=== Lower reaches ===
- Beece Creek
- Elkin Creek
- Tete Angela Creek

== See also ==
- List of rivers of British Columbia
- List of tributaries of the Fraser River
- Taseko Mountain
- Nemaiah Valley, British Columbia
