= Dil-Dil Plateau =

- Plateau
- Location within British Columbia
- Coordinates: 51°13′00″N 123°10′00″W
- Location: British Columbia, Canada
- Part of: Chilcotin Ranges and Chilcotin Plateau
- Orogeny: Miocene to Pliocene
- Geology: Flood basalt

The Dil-Dil Plateau is a small lava plateau on the west side of the upper valley of Big Creek in the southern Chilcotin District of the Central Interior of British Columbia. The plateau is a shelf-like extension of the subrange of the Chilcotin Ranges containing Taseko Mountain and Mount Vic to the west, and is roughly rectangular in shape, and of c.25–30 km^{2} in area and forming a transition between the range and the Chilcotin Plateau at 2000m-2300m.

The Dil-Dil Plateau consists mostly of flat-lying basaltic lava flows ranging from Miocene to Pliocene age. These basalts are part of a larger volcanic formation known as the Chilcotin Group.
