= Lord River (Canada) =

Coordinates: 51°09′00″N 123°33′00″W

The Lord River is a tributary of the Taseko River in the southern Chilcotin District of the Central Interior of British Columbia, Canada, joining that river via the head of Upper Taseko Lake, which is also fed by the upper reaches of the Taseko River proper. The Lord River rises in the area of Lord Pass, which connects to the headwater area of the Bridge River immediately south.

== See also ==
- List of rivers of British Columbia
- Tchaikazan River
- Tsy'los Provincial Park
