= Tchaikazan River =

Coordinates: 51°12′38″N 123°35′46″W

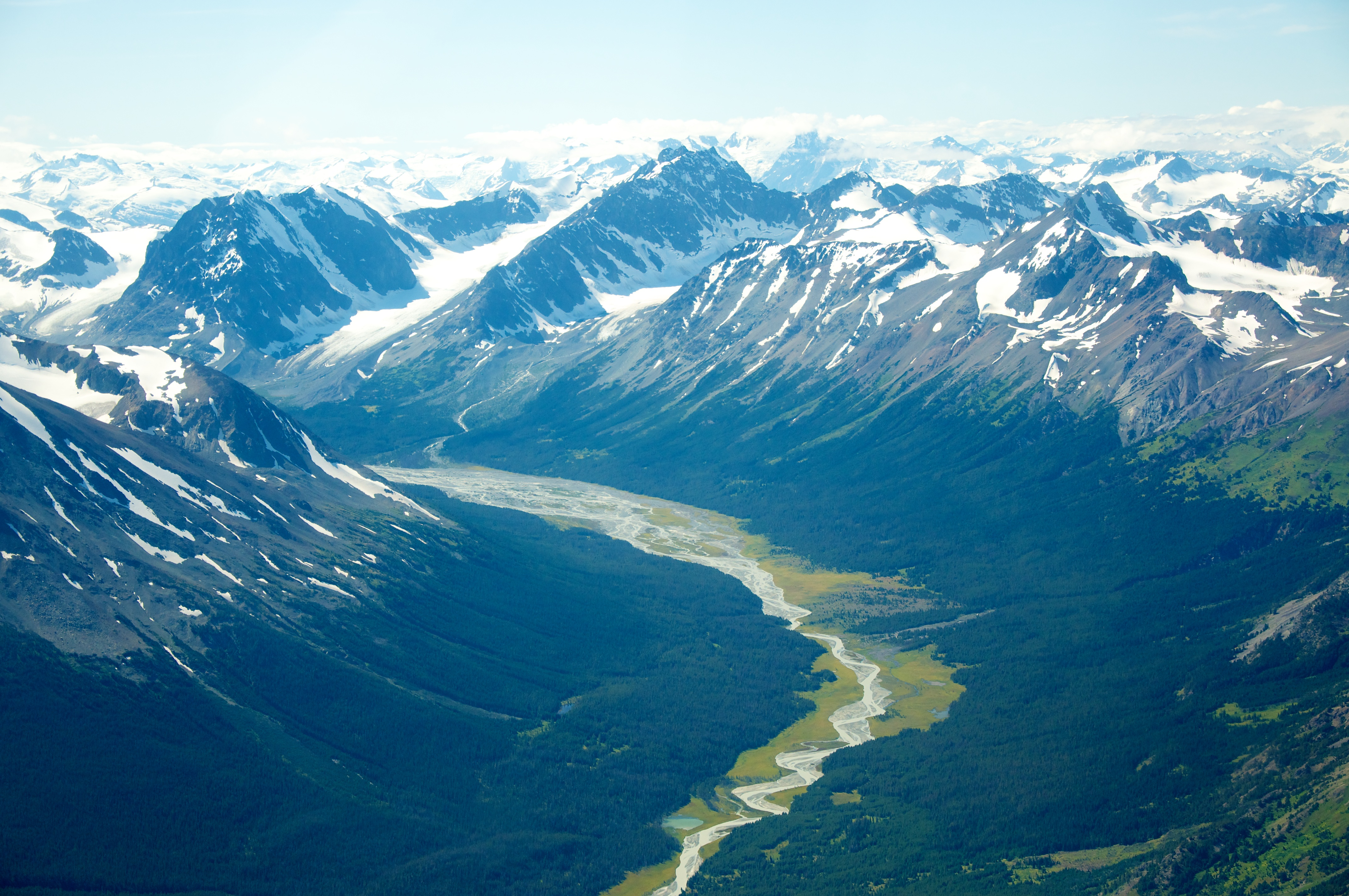
Aerial view of Tchaikazan River

The Tchaikazan River is an important tributary of the Taseko River in the Chilcotin District of the Central Interior of British Columbia, flowing into it from the southwest at the narrows of the Taseko Lakes from its source on the north flank of Mount Monmouth. The river's course is ~35 km in length.

== Name origin ==
The name is derived from the Chilcotin language Ts^icheza'on, referring to black spire visible from the river's valley. There is a waterfall on the river is called nataghelts'ig (meanings not provided).

== See also ==
- List of rivers of British Columbia
- Lord River (Canada)
- Nemaiah Valley, British Columbia
- Gunn Valley
