= Akamina Ridge =

Ridge in British Columbia, Canada

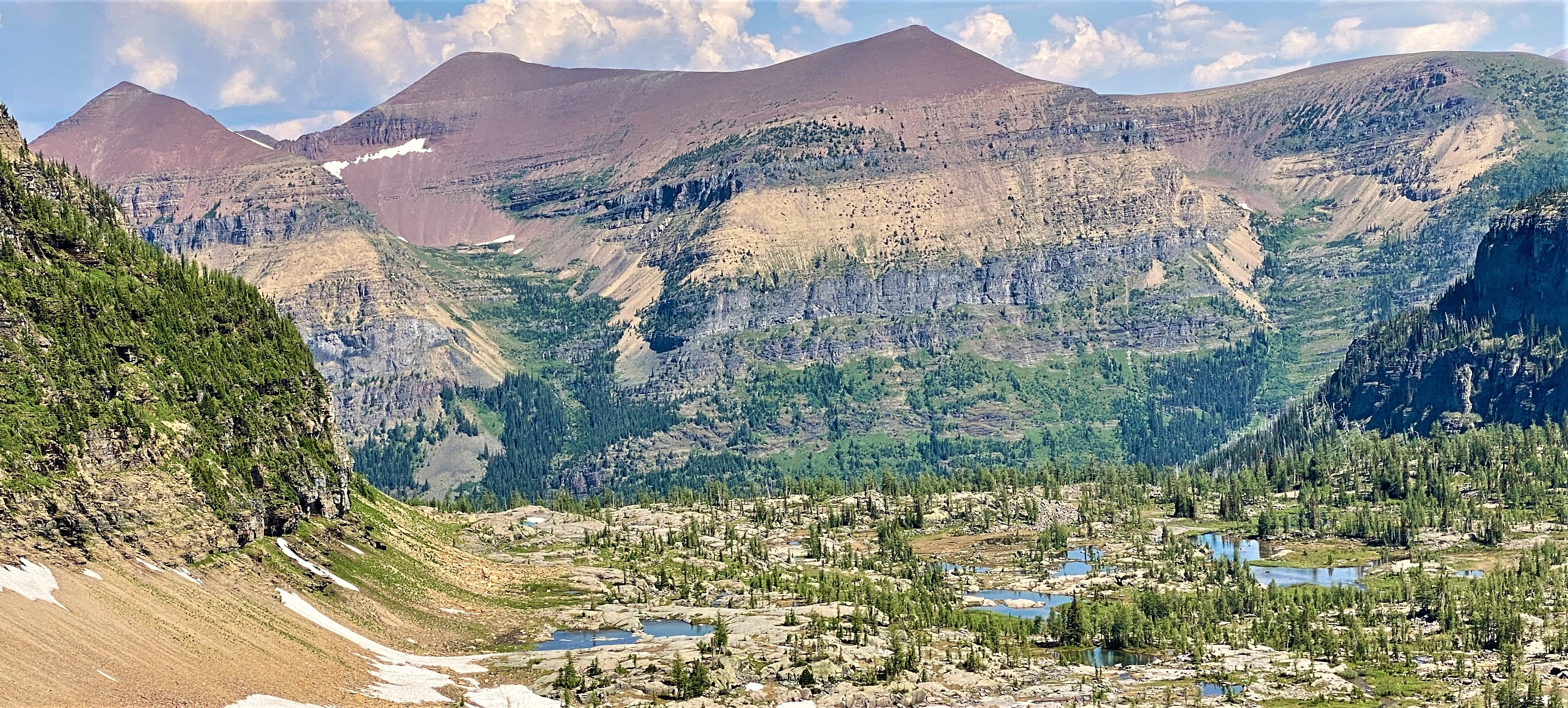
- South aspect

Highest point
- Elevation: 2,600 m (8,530 ft)
- Listing: Mountains of British Columbia
- Coordinates: 49°00′34″N 114°06′25″W

Geography
- Location within British Columbia Location within Canada
- Interactive map of Akamina Ridge
- Country: Canada
- Province: British Columbia
- District: Kootenay Land District
- Protected area: Akamina-Kishinena Provincial Park
- Parent range: Clark Range; Rocky Mountains
- Topo map: NTS 82G1 Sage Creek

Climbing
- Easiest route: Scrambling

Akamina Ridge is a mountain in British Columbia, Canada.

== Description ==
Akamina Ridge, elevation 2,600-metres (8,530-feet), is located in the extreme southeastern tip of British Columbia within Akamina-Kishinena Provincial Park. It is a spur trending west off the Continental Divide and is part of the Clark Range in the Rocky Mountains. It is situated 2 km (1 mi) west of Cameron Lake and 4 km (2 mi) northeast of Upper Kintla Lake along the Canada–United States border. Precipitation runoff from the ridge's slopes drains into tributaries of the North Fork Flathead River. Topographic relief is significant as the summit rises 1,125 metres (3,690 feet) above Kintla Creek in two kilometres (1.2 mile). Access to this mountain is from the Akamina Pass Trail which starts at the Akamina Parkway in Waterton Lakes National Park in Alberta. The word "akamina" translates as "high bench land" from the Kutenai language. The landform's toponym was officially adopted on April 6, 1960, by the Geographical Names Board of Canada.

== Climate ==
Based on the Köppen climate classification, Akamina Ridge is located in a subarctic climate zone characterized by long, usually very cold winters, and short, cool to mild summers.

== Geology ==
Akamina Ridge is composed of sedimentary rock laid down during the Precambrian to Jurassic periods. Formed in shallow seas, this sedimentary rock was pushed east and over the top of younger Cretaceous period rock during the Laramide orogeny.

== See also ==
- Geography of British Columbia
- Scrambles in the Canadian Rockies
