= François Lake =

Lake in British Columbia, Canada

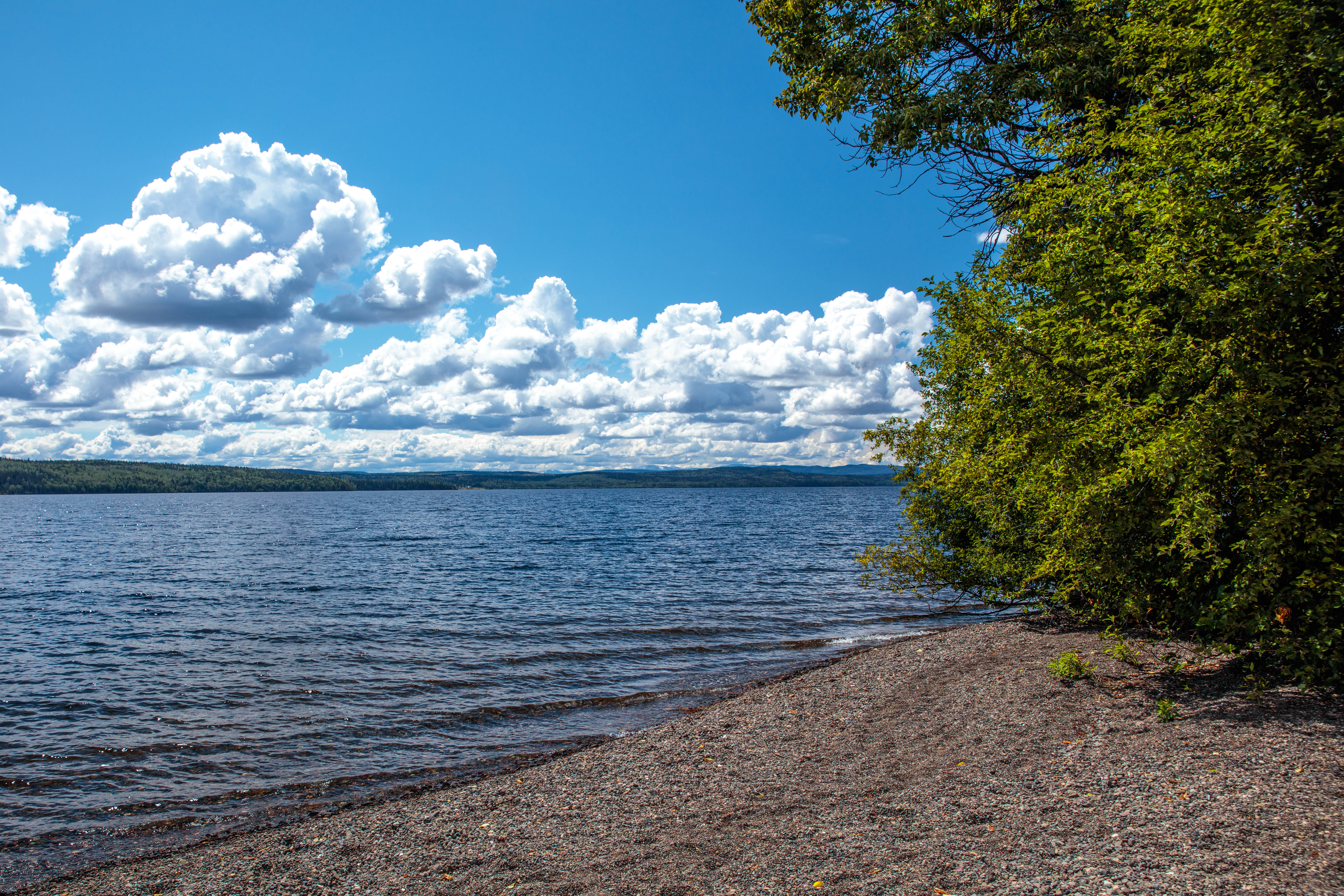

- Location within British Columbia
- Location: British Columbia
- Group: Nechako Lakes
- Coordinates: 54°2′N 125°43′W
- Primary inflows: Nadina River
- Primary outflows: Stellako River
- Basin countries: Canada
- Max. length: 110 km (68 mi)
- Max. depth: 244.4 m (802 ft)
- Surface elevation: 715 m (2,346 ft)

François Lake in British Columbia is about 30 km (19 mi) south of Burns Lake and 10 km (6.2 mi) west of Fraser Lake. The lake is 110 km (68 mi) long, making it the second longest natural lake entirely within British Columbia after Babine Lake. Nadina River is the inflow of the lake at the west and Stellako River is the outflow of the lake. The lake is popularly fished for its rainbow trout and char.

Because of its shape, the lake was called Nidabun, meaning "lip lake." The French-Canadians mistook Nidaa for nedo, which meant "whiteman," and named it Lac des Français (meaning Lake of the French). The name Français later was altered to François and is pronounced locally as Francis.

== Climate ==
Equity Silver is a weather station roughly 20 km (12.4 miles) north of François Lake, at an elevation of 1280 m (4199 ft). Equity Silver has a subarctic climate (Köppen Dfc), bordering on a tundra climate (Köppen ET).

Climate data for Equity Silver, British Columbia (1981-2010): 1280m
| Month | Jan | Feb | Mar | Apr | May | Jun | Jul | Aug | Sep | Oct | Nov | Dec | Year |
|---|---|---|---|---|---|---|---|---|---|---|---|---|---|
| Record high °C (°F) | 9.0 (48.2) | 10.5 (50.9) | 12.5 (54.5) | 20.0 (68.0) | 30.0 (86.0) | 29.0 (84.2) | 30.0 (86.0) | 29.0 (84.2) | 28.0 (82.4) | 21.0 (69.8) | 9.0 (48.2) | 9.5 (49.1) | 30.0 (86.0) |
| Mean daily maximum °C (°F) | −4.8 (23.4) | −2.6 (27.3) | 0.3 (32.5) | 5.4 (41.7) | 9.6 (49.3) | 14.4 (57.9) | 16.6 (61.9) | 16.5 (61.7) | 11.6 (52.9) | 4.9 (40.8) | −1.4 (29.5) | −4.2 (24.4) | 5.5 (41.9) |
| Daily mean °C (°F) | −8.4 (16.9) | −6.8 (19.8) | −4.0 (24.8) | 0.9 (33.6) | 4.9 (40.8) | 9.5 (49.1) | 11.6 (52.9) | 11.5 (52.7) | 7.3 (45.1) | 1.6 (34.9) | −4.4 (24.1) | −7.5 (18.5) | 1.3 (34.3) |
| Mean daily minimum °C (°F) | −11.8 (10.8) | −10.7 (12.7) | −8.2 (17.2) | −3.7 (25.3) | 0.3 (32.5) | 4.5 (40.1) | 6.5 (43.7) | 6.6 (43.9) | 2.9 (37.2) | −1.7 (28.9) | −7.4 (18.7) | −10.8 (12.6) | −2.8 (27.0) |
| Record low °C (°F) | −44.0 (−47.2) | −36.0 (−32.8) | −32.0 (−25.6) | −20.0 (−4.0) | −14.0 (6.8) | −4.0 (24.8) | −2.0 (28.4) | 0.0 (32.0) | −7.0 (19.4) | −25.0 (−13.0) | −37.0 (−34.6) | −38.0 (−36.4) | −44.0 (−47.2) |
| Average precipitation mm (inches) | 64.7 (2.55) | 40.8 (1.61) | 39.6 (1.56) | 28.1 (1.11) | 46.0 (1.81) | 71.9 (2.83) | 69.8 (2.75) | 53.7 (2.11) | 56.4 (2.22) | 70.6 (2.78) | 62.8 (2.47) | 57.2 (2.25) | 661.6 (26.05) |
| Average snowfall cm (inches) | 63.0 (24.8) | 40.6 (16.0) | 38.7 (15.2) | 17.8 (7.0) | 8.7 (3.4) | 0.7 (0.3) | 0.0 (0.0) | 0.0 (0.0) | 1.9 (0.7) | 31.1 (12.2) | 55.3 (21.8) | 56.2 (22.1) | 314 (123.5) |
| Average precipitation days (≥ 0.2 mm) | 12.1 | 7.9 | 8.0 | 7.7 | 11.5 | 12.3 | 13.5 | 11.2 | 12.4 | 14.0 | 11.7 | 9.6 | 131.9 |
| Average snowy days (≥ 0.2 cm) | 11.9 | 7.8 | 7.6 | 5.0 | 2.2 | 0.3 | 0.0 | 0.0 | 0.8 | 6.3 | 10.5 | 9.4 | 61.8 |
Source: Environment Canada

== See also ==
- List of lakes of British Columbia
- François Lake Provincial Park
