= Taylor Pass (British Columbia) =

- Location within British Columbia

Third Approach
- Location: British Columbia, Canada
- Range: Chilcotin Ranges
- Coordinates: 51°00′00″N 123°16′00″W
- Topo map: NTS 92O3 Warner Pass

Taylor Pass is a mountain pass in the Chilcotin Ranges of the Coast Mountains of British Columbia, Canada, located at the divide between the headwaters of the Taseko River and those of Gun Creek, a tributary of the Bridge River.

== See also ==
- List of mountain passes
- Spruce Lake Protected Area
- Tsy'los Provincial Park
