= Miramichi =

The name "Miramichi" was first applied to a region in the northeast of New Brunswick, Canada, and has since been applied to other places in Canada and the United States. Although other interpretations have been suggested, it is believed that "Miramichi" was derived from the Montagnais words "Maissimeu Assi" (meaning Mi'kmaq Land), and was perhaps introduced for use in European languages by Jacques Cartier in 1535.

Miramichi is used in the names of many places, including:

== Settlements ==
=== Canada ===
New Brunswick

- Miramichi, New Brunswick, a city in northern New Brunswick
  - Nelson-Miramichi, New Brunswick, a dissolved community that was merged into Miramichi in a 1995 municipal amalgamation

New Brunswick electoral districts

- Miramichi—Grand Lake, the current federal electoral district
- Miramichi, an earlier federal electoral district in New Brunswick (known as Northumberland and later as Northumberland-Miramichi)
- Miramichi (provincial electoral district)
- Miramichi-Bay du Vin, a provincial electoral district for New Brunswick
- Southwest Miramichi, a provincial electoral district for New Brunswick
- Miramichi Centre, a provincial electoral district for New Brunswick
- Miramichi Bay-Neguac, a provincial electoral district for New Brunswick

Nova Scotia

- Miramichi, Nova Scotia, a community in Inverness County, Nova Scotia

Ontario

- Miramichi, a geographical area in Sudbury District, Ontario
- Pembroke, Ontario, formerly known as Miramichi, Canada West (ca. 1828-1850)

=== United States ===
- Miramichi, a community in Middletown, Connecticut
- Miramichi, an historic post office in Hamilton County, Nebraska

== Geographic features ==
=== Canada ===
New Brunswick

- Miramichi River
  - Southwest Miramichi River
  - Northwest Miramichi River
  - Little Southwest Miramichi River
- Miramichi Valley, a region frequently shortened to simply "Miramichi"
- Miramichi Highlands, a physiographic region of New Brunswick
- Miramichi Lake, a lake lying at the headwaters of the Southwest Miramichi River in York County, New Brunswick
- Miramichi Bay, an estuary of the Gulf of St. Lawrence

Nova Scotia

- Miramichi Brook, a stream in Inverness County, Nova Scotia

Ontario

- Miramichi Bay, a bay in Bruce County, Ontario
- Miramichi Island, an island in Muskoka District, Ontario
- Miramichi Island, an island in Parry Sound District, Ontario
- Muskrat River, Ontario (near Pembroke) - formerly known as Miramichi River

Yukon

- Miramichi Glacier

=== United States ===
- Miramichi Lake, a lake in Osceola County, Michigan
- Lake Mirimichi, a reservoir in Norfolk County, Massachusetts

== Other places ==
- Miramichi Bridge, a bridge crossing the Miramichi River at Newcastle, New Brunswick, Canada
