= Canim Beach Provincial Park =

Provincial park in British Columbia, Canada

- IUCN category II (national park)
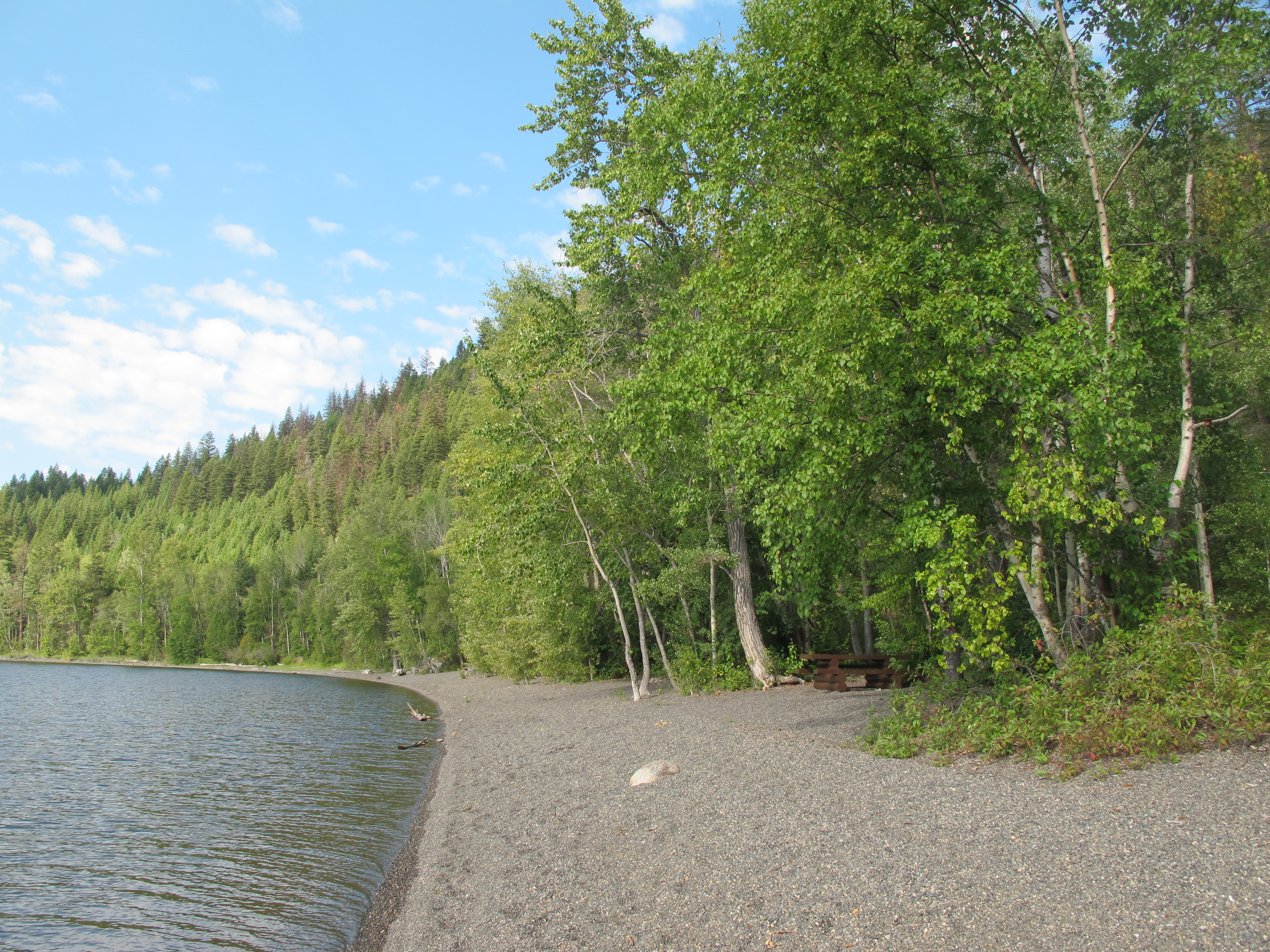
- Canim Beach Provincial Park

- Location within British Columbia
- Interactive map of Canim Beach Provincial Park
- Location: Lillooet Land District, British Columbia, Canada
- Nearest city: 100 Mile House, BC
- Coordinates: 51°49′31″N 120°52′14″W
- Area: 8.2 ha (20 acres)
- Established: March 16, 1956
- Governing body: BC Parks

Canim Beach Provincial Park is a provincial park in British Columbia, Canada, located at the southwest end of Canim Lake in the Interlakes District of the South Cariboo region, adjacent to the Secwepemc Indian reserve community of Canim Lake, British Columbia just northeast of 100 Mile House. The park was established by Order-in-Council in 1956 and expanded by later legislation in 2000 and 2004 to total a current approximate of 8.2 hectares (20 acres), 3.6 hectares (8.9 acres) of upland and 4.6 hectares (11 acres) of foreshore.

"Canim" means a type of large canoe in the Chinook Jargon.

== See also ==
- Canim Falls
- Canim Lake Band
- Canim River
