= Nadina Mountain =

Mountain in northern British Columbia

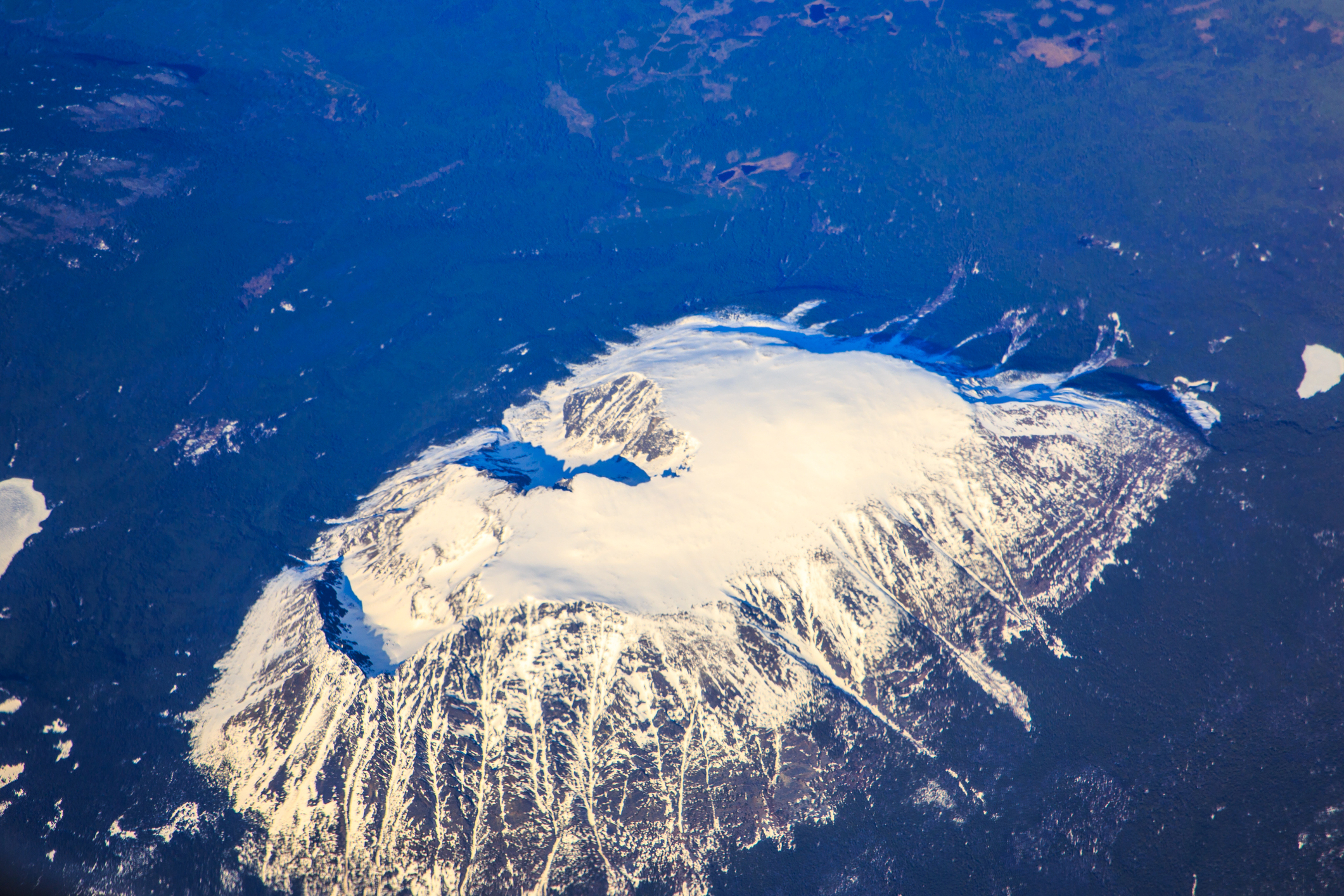
- Nadina Mountain, aerial view

Highest point
- Elevation: 2,111 m (6,926 ft)
- Prominence: 592 m (1,942 ft)
- Parent peak: Sibola Peak (2177 m)
- Listing: Mountains of British Columbia
- Coordinates: 54°05′43″N 126°52′43″W

Geography
- Location within British Columbia Location within Canada
- Country: Canada
- Province: British Columbia
- District: Range 4 Coast Land District
- Protected area: Nadina Mountain Provincial Park
- Parent range: Nechako Plateau
- Topo map: NTS 93L2 Owen Lake

Geology
- Mountain type: Intrusive
- Rock type: Granitic

Climbing
- Easiest route: Primitive trail, couloir scramble

Nadina Mountain, is a remote 2,111-metre (6,926-foot) granitic mountain of volcanic origins located in Nadina Mountain Provincial Park in northern British Columbia, Canada. Situated 30 km (19 mi) south of Houston, British Columbia, it rises 700 m (2,300 ft) above the forested foothills of the rolling terrain of the Nechako Plateau, upon which it is the third highest peak. The peak is a striking feature on the surrounding landscape, and is theorized to have been a refugia during the last glacial period. A diverse community of lichen species grows on the summit plateau, but few vascular plants grow due to nutritionally poor soils from the granitic substrate. Vegetation below treeline consists mostly of subalpine fir. The mountain was established as a park in 2008 due in large part to its wildlife habitat status, especially for mountain goats. The park size is 2,789 hectares. The nearest higher peak is Mount Ney, 41.7 km (25.9 mi) to the southwest, and precipitation runoff from Nadina drains into tributaries of the Fraser River. Based on the Köppen climate classification, Nadina Mountain is located in a subarctic climate zone with cold winters, and mild summers. Temperatures can drop below −20 °C with wind chill factors below −30 °C.

== History ==
Located within Wetʼsuwetʼen First Nations traditional territory, Naydeena Mountain is a place where Wet’suwet’en people would go to hunt caribou, marmot, and mountain goat. This feature was labelled as "Na-di-na Mtn" on George Mercer Dawson's 1879 Geological Survey of Canada map where it first appeared. In the Babine-Witsuwitʼen language, Na-di-na means "standing up alone", a reference to its prominent, free-standing isolation. The mountain's name was officially adopted October 6, 1936, by the Geographical Names Board of Canada. The nearby Nadina River takes its name from the mountain.

== See also ==
- Geography of British Columbia
