= Nadina River =

- Location in British Columbia

Location
- Country: Canada
- Province: British Columbia
- District: Range 4 Coast Land District

Physical characteristics
- Mouth: François Lake
  - coordinates: 53°59′00″N 126°31′00″W

The Nadina River is a river in Range 4 Coast Land District, British Columbia, Canada. It feeds into François Lake at its west end. François Lake is about 30 kilometres (19 mi) south of Burns Lake on Highway 35.

== Name origin ==
The name is derived from that of Nadina Mountain, which is near its outlet, the name of which means "standing up alone" in the Carrier language. The river's actual name in Carrier, not adopted by the geographical names board, is "Nadinako".

== Settlement ==
A post office and settlement at the west end of François Lake, abandoned in the 1960s, was also named Nadina River.

== See also ==
- List of rivers of British Columbia
