= Stellako River =

Location
- Country: Canada
- Province: British Columbia
- Districts: Range 4 Coast Land District; Range 5 Coast Land District

Physical characteristics
- Source: François Lake
- Mouth: Fraser Lake
  - coordinates: 54°3′21″N 124°53′6″W
  - elevation: 664 m (2,178 ft)
- Length: 11.3 km (7.0 mi)
- Discharge
  - location: gage at Glenannan
  - average: 21.1 m^{3}/s (750 cu ft/s)
  - minimum: 1.98 m^{3}/s (70 cu ft/s)
  - maximum: 183 m^{3}/s (6,500 cu ft/s)

The Stellako River is an 11.3-kilometre (7.0 mi) long river in the Nechako Plateau region of the Canadian province of British Columbia. It flows from François Lake to Fraser Lake, which joins the Nechako River via the short Nautley River. The Nechako is a tributary of the Fraser River.

== See also ==
- List of rivers of British Columbia
