= Akamina-Kishinena Provincial Park =

Provincial park in British Columbia, Canada

- IUCN category II (national park)
- Location within British Columbia
- Interactive map of Akamina-Kishinena Provincial Park
- Location: East Kootenay, British Columbia, Canada
- Nearest town: Waterton Park, Alberta
- Coordinates: 49°01′30″N 114°12′00″W
- Area: 10,921.5 ha (42.168 sq mi)
- Designation: Class A Provincial Park
- Established: July 13, 1995
- Governing body: BC Parks

Akamina-Kishinena Provincial Park is a provincial park located in the southeastern corner of British Columbia, Canada. The park was established by order-in-council on July 13, 1995, to protect the ecological integrity of a relatively narrow stretch of the Rocky Mountains in the southeastern corner of the province.

== History and conservation ==
The trails and passes of the Akamina-Kishinena were used for many years by the early peoples and wildlife travelling between the Flathead Basin and the abundant Great Plains. For instance, the Kootenai aboriginal people travelled through South Kootenay Pass to reach the plains for trading and buffalo hunting.

Since 1917, conservationists have advocated for the preservation of the Flathead River watershed in the southeastern corner of the province. The park would compliment and be worthy of adding to the adjacent Waterton Glacier International Peace Park.

In 1986, the region was designated a provincial Recreation Area under the Park Act and was proposed for full protection under the Protected Areas Strategy (PAS) and Commission of Resources and Environment (CORE) process. The recreation area was then upgraded to the status of a "Class A" provincial park on July 12, 1995.

== Geography ==
Akamina-Kishinena Provincial Park encompasses 10,921.5 hectares (26,988 acres) of high peaks and broad forested valleys in the watershed of the Flathead River. The park is adjacent to the much larger Waterton Lakes National Park in Alberta and Glacier National Park in the U.S. state of Montana, which together form the Waterton Glacier International Peace Park. The summit of the Akamina Pass, on the border with Alberta, is the easternmost point in British Columbia.

== Ecology ==
The park preserves part of the habitat of the last self-sustaining grizzly bear population in the United States, as well as a winter range for goats and big horn sheep. Protected plant species include the rare Mimulus luteus (yellow monkey flower) and the rare Papaver pygmaeum (pigmy poppy) that are found nowhere else in BC.
