= Chilko Lake =

Lake in British Columbia, Canada

- Tŝilhqox Biny
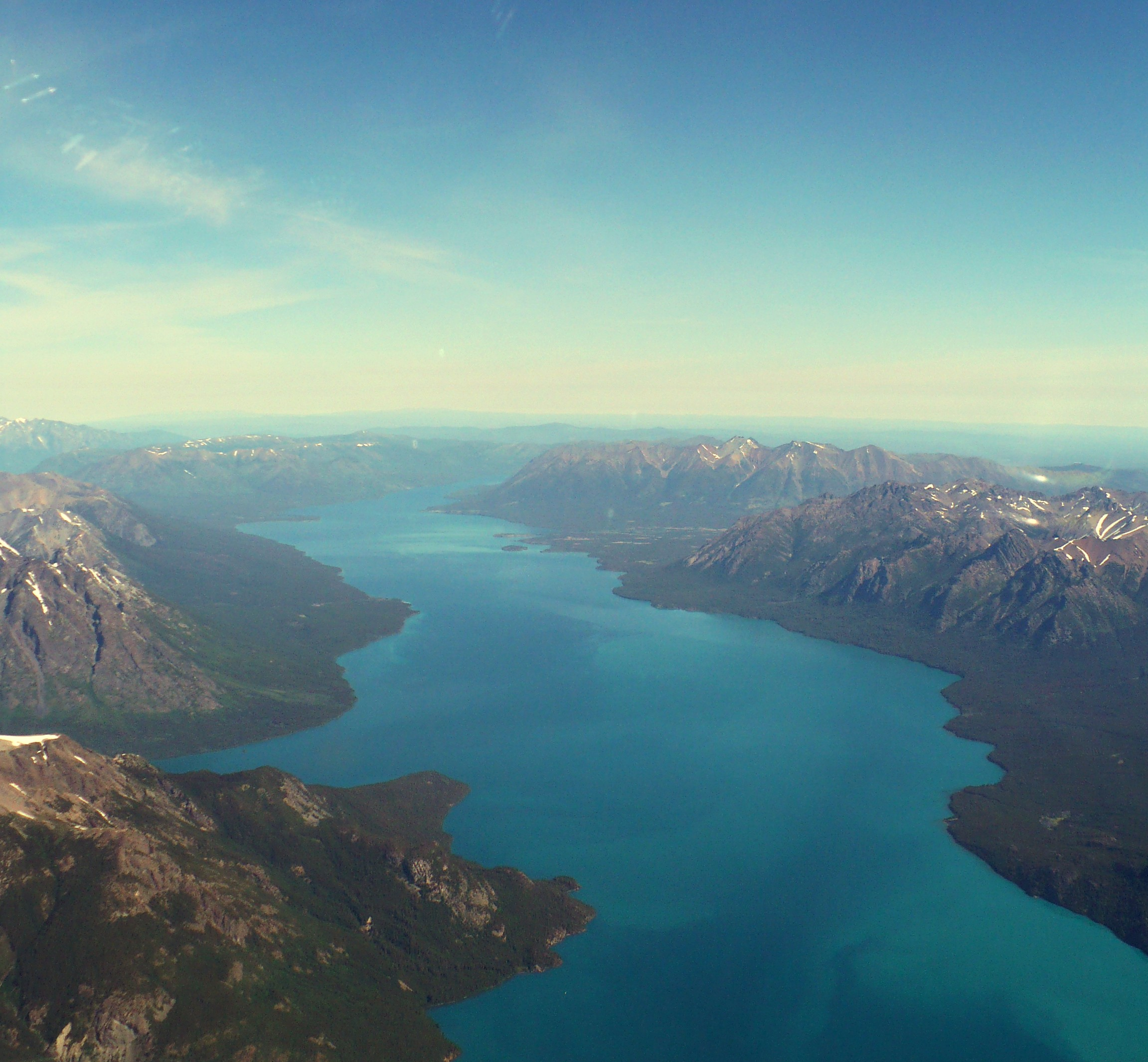

- Location within British Columbia
- Location: Chilcotin District, west-central British Columbia
- Coordinates: 51°16′N 124°3′W
- Primary outflows: Chilko River
- Catchment area: 2,130 km^{2} (820 sq mi)
- Basin countries: Canada
- Max. length: 65 kilometres (40 mi)
- Max. width: 5.2 kilometres (3.2 mi)
- Surface area: 184 km^{2} (71 sq mi)
- Average depth: 108 m (354 ft)
- Max. depth: 366 m (1,201 ft)
- Water volume: 21.2 cubic kilometres (5.1 mi^{3})
- Residence time: 7.6 years
- Shore length^{1}: 181 km (112 mi)
- Surface elevation: 1,172 metres (3,845 ft)
- Islands: Duff Island
- Settlements: None
- ^{1} Shore length is not a well-defined measure.

Chilko Lake, officially Tŝilhqox Biny (Pronounced: Tsyle-koh Bee), is a 180-square-kilometre (69 sq mi) lake in west-central British Columbia, at the head of the Chilko River on the Chilcotin Plateau. The lake is about 65 kilometres (40 mi) long, with a southwest arm 10 kilometres (6.2 mi) long. It is one of the largest lakes by volume in the province because of its great depth, and the largest above 1,000 metres (3,300 ft) in elevation. It and Harrison Lake are the largest lakes in the southern Coast Mountains.

On March 11, 2019, the province of British Columbia, working with the Tŝilhqot’in National Government, officially changed the name of the lake from Chilko Lake to Tŝilhqox Biny.

== Geography ==
The inland equivalent of the many fjords which line the British Columbia Coast on the other side of the Coast Mountains, Chilko Lake's glacial valley opens not out onto the ocean, but onto a broad lava plateau that lies inland from the highest section of the main range. The mountains at the head of the lake are among the highest in the province, and two broad, deep glacial valleys connect east to the smaller Taseko Lakes, which drains northwards parallel to the Chilko River, both of them converging with the Chilcotin River which is a tributary of the Fraser. Tatlayoko Lake, to the west across another range, is not part of the Chilcotin-Fraser drainage, however, but is part of the Homathko River drainage to Bute Inlet.

The area spanning the head of Chilko Lake and Taseko Lake basins and the two valleys between the two lakes has been preserved as the Tsʼilʔos Provincial Park, which is co-administered by the Parks Branch of the provincial government and by the Xeni Gwet'in, who are the residents of Nemaia Valley and one of the component bands of the Tsilhqot'in (Chilcotin) people; Nemaia is the more northerly of the two east–west valleys, the southerly one is Yohetta Valley. Tsi'lʔos is the Tsilhqot'in name for Mount Tatlow at 3,063 metres (10,049 ft), which stands in the ranges between Chilko and Taseko Lakes. Higher still are the mountains at the head of Chilko Lake, crowned by 3,182-metre (10,440 ft) Monmouth Mountain, and to the southwest of the lake, between the two arms, is Mount Good Hope at 3,242 metres (10,636 ft), with the range rising west from there towards Mount Queen Bess at 3,298 metres (10,820 ft), to the south of Tatlayoko Lake and higher still beyond to Mount Waddington.

== History ==
The area around Chilko Lake was where some of the backwoods maneuverings and sit-outs of the Chilcotin War of 1864 took place, and the Tsilhqot'in people who live here, the Xeni Gwet'in, are said to include descendants of Klatsassin, the main leader of the war. The vicinity of the lake is also the habitat of some of the last holdouts of the Chilcotin Country's once-numerous herds of wild horses, especially in the plateau-terrain area known as the Brittany Triangle area between the Chilko and Taseko Rivers, which is currently (2005) a subject of preservationist vs resource industry controversy, though not as high profile as other regions of the province.

In the 1950s, Chilko Lake and River were passed over as a potential hydropower resource for Alcan due to the salmon presence.

Projected hydroelectric plans to divert the Taseko Lakes into Chilko Lake, and the combined Chilko and Taseko flows into Tatlayoko Lake and via a series of dams down the Homathko River, have been scrapped because of the provincial park status enjoyed by Chilko and Taseko Lakes. The area between Tatlayoko and Chilko Lake is not protected, however, and plans for the dams and power plants in the canyon the Homathko River are still possible. One, the largest, would be built immediately atop the site of the first "battle" of the Chilcotin War, marked on government maps as "Murderer's Bar".

== See also ==
- List of lakes of British Columbia
- Alone: Grizzly Mountain (Season 8)
