= Taseko Lakes =

Group of lakes in British Columbia, Canada

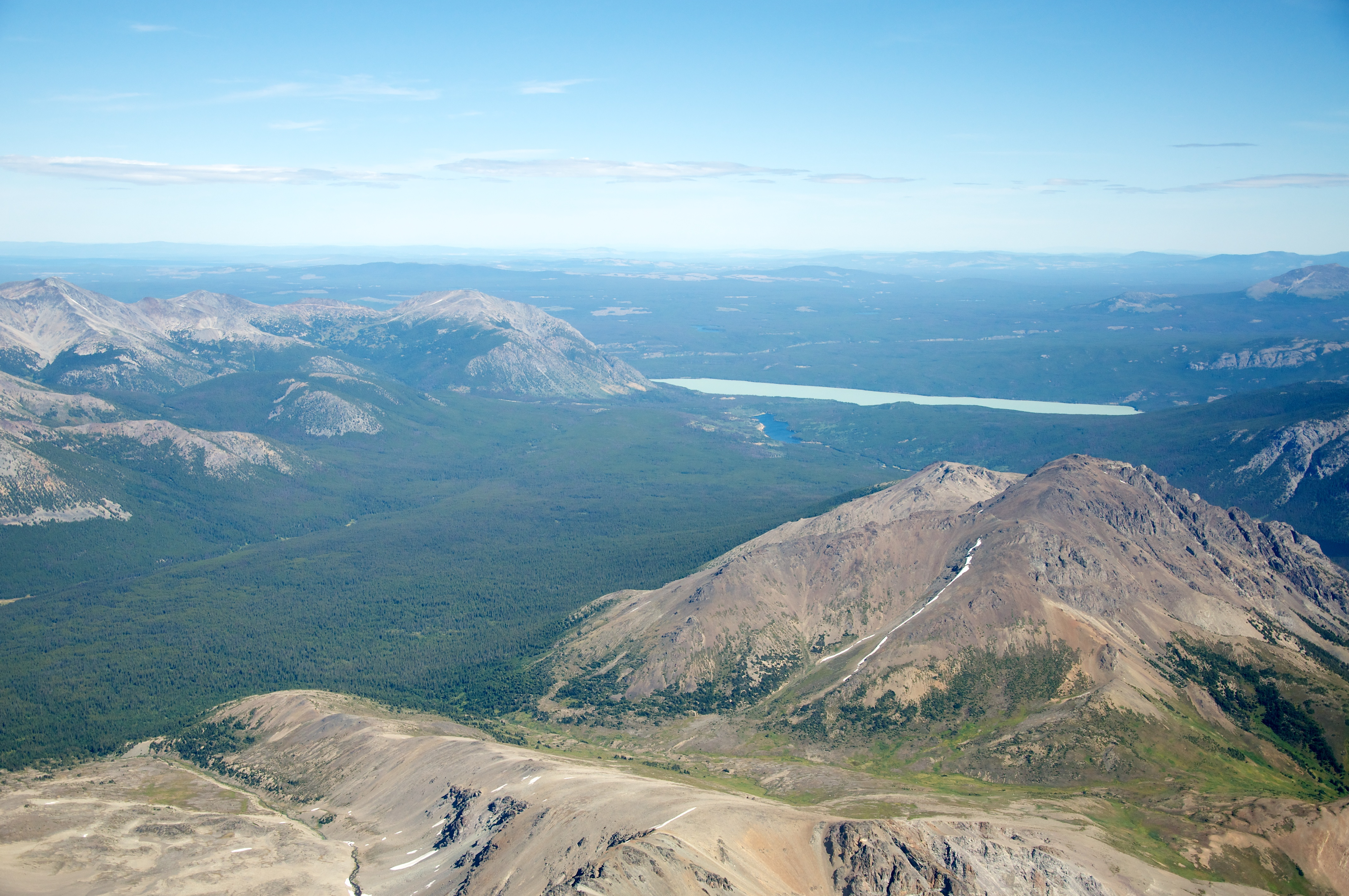

- Location within British Columbia
- Location: British Columbia
- Coordinates: 51°15′33″N 123°35′26″W
- Primary inflows: Taseko River, Lord River, Tchaikazan River
- Primary outflows: Taseko River
- Basin countries: Canada
- Max. length: 25 km (16 mi)
- Max. width: 1.8 km (1.1 mi)
- Surface area: 17.56 km^{2} (6.78 sq mi)
- Average depth: 43.3 m (142 ft)
- Max. depth: 110.6 m (363 ft)
- Water volume: 1.35 km^{3} (0.32 cu mi)
- Surface elevation: 1,323 m (4,341 ft)
- Islands: None
- Settlements: None

The Taseko Lakes are a pair of lakes, Upper Taseko Lake and Lower Taseko Lake, which are expansions of the upper Taseko River in the southern Chilcotin District of the Central Interior of British Columbia, Canada. Their name is based on the original in the Chilcotin language, Dasiqox Biny, where "Desiqox" means "Mosquito River" and is cognate to the name of the river as in English; the Chilcotin name refers to both lakes as one lake, which was also originally the case with the English usage until official designation of the separate lakes in 1954. The lakes are separated by the short Taseko Narrows, the name of which in Chilcotin is nanats'akash, and is an important crossing place for deer. The Tchaikazan River flows the area between the upper & lower lake from the southwest, while the Taseko River feeds it from the southeast, while the equally large Lord River joins it from the south, at the head of the lake.

== History ==
The Taseko Lakes were proposed to be part of a massive hydroelectric development which would have seen the flow of the Taseko River dammed and diverted westward via a tunnel to Chilko Lake, which would have been also dammed and diverted through further tunnels to Tatlayoko Lake on the Homathko River, which unlike the Taseko and Chilko Rivers drains directly to the ocean at Bute Inlet rather than via the Chilcotin and Fraser Rivers. Fisheries and aboriginal land claims concerns have derailed the Taseko diversion, although the Chilko diversion remains as a possibility.

The Taseko Lakes are now part of Tsʼilʔos Provincial Park, which also includes Chilko Lake and the intervening country, including Nemaiah Valley and Yohetta Valley, which form wide alpentals connecting the two lake valleys.

== See also ==
- Taseko Mountain
- Brittany Triangle
- Chilcotin War
- Gunn Valley
