= Taseko Mountain =

Mountain in British Columbia, Canada

- Location within British Columbia

Highest point
- Elevation: 3,063 m (10,049 ft)
- Prominence: 1,277 m (4,190 ft)
- Parent peak: Monmouth Mountain (3182 m)
- Listing: Mountains of British Columbia
- Coordinates: 51°14′00″N 123°28′23″W

Geography
- Location: British Columbia, Canada
- District: Lillooet Land District
- Parent range: Chilcotin Ranges ← Pacific Ranges
- Topo map: NTS 92O3 Warner Pass

Climbing
- Easiest route: rock climb

Taseko Mountain, also known as Mount Taseko (pronounced Ta-SEE-ko) 3063 m (10049 ft), prominence: 1277 m, is one of the principal summits of the Chilcotin Ranges, part of the Pacific Ranges subdivision of the Coast Mountains of southern British Columbia. Standing just east of the Taseko Lakes, it is the highest summit between the Taseko Lakes and the Fraser River, and the highest east of the pass between the basins of the Lord and Bridge Rivers. North and east of Taseko Mountain the landscape drops off dramatically to the flat Chilcotin Plateau. Immediately west across Taseko Lake is Mount Tatlow, which has the same elevation as Taseko Mountain.
