= Tsʼilʔos Provincial Park =

Provincial park in British Columbia, Canada

- IUCN category Ib (wilderness area)
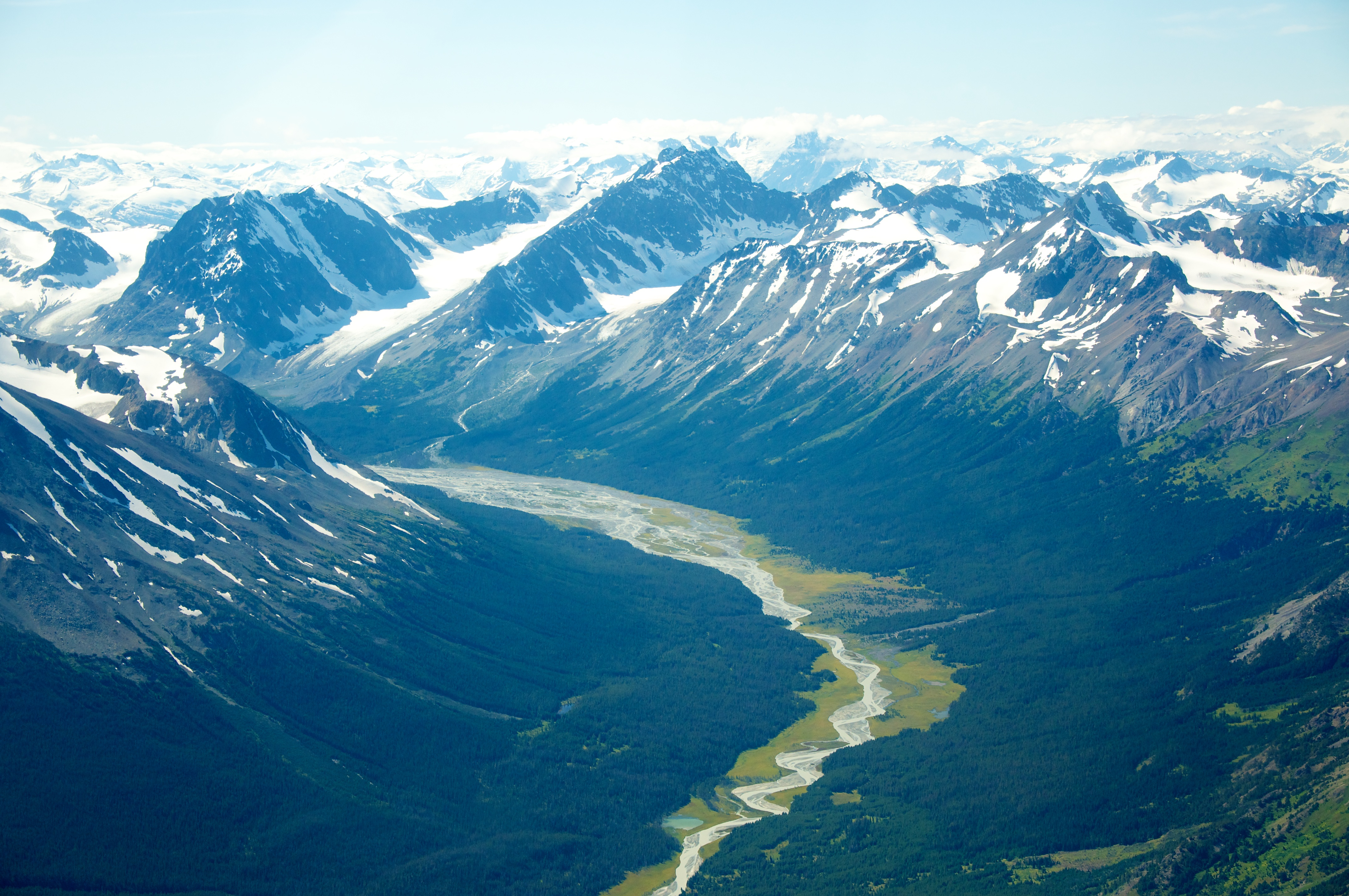
- A glaciated valley southeast of Chilko Lake in Tsʼilʔos Provincial Park

- Location within British Columbia
- Interactive map of Tsʼilʔos Provincial Park
- Location: Cariboo RD, British Columbia, Canada
- Nearest city: Williams Lake
- Coordinates: 51°09′00″N 123°59′00″W
- Area: 233,240 ha (900.5 sq mi)
- Established: 12 February 1994
- Governing body: BC Parks

Tsʼilʔos Provincial Park is a provincial park in British Columbia, Canada. Tsʼilʔos (/ˈsaɪlɒs/ SY-loss; roughly [t͡sʼelʔos] in Chilcotin) is the official BC Parks designation for this provincial park, though sometimes it is written as "Tsʼil-os", "Tsʼyl-os", or "Tsylos". The "ʔ" in the name represents a glottal stop.

== History ==
The park was established January 1994 after a five-year planning process was implemented to address long-standing conflicts between preservationist, resource extraction and First Nations interests. After decades of controversy, a consensus was reached among various conservation, logging, mining, tourism and public participants. Chief Roger William of the Xeni Gwet’in (Nemiah Indian Band) was very involved in the planning process and negotiations with the provincial government. The park is part of the traditional territory of the Xeni Gwet’in. Tsʼilʔos, also known as Mount Tatlow, dominates the park and gives it its name, and is spiritually significant to the Xeni Gwet’in. According to tradition, Tsʼilʔos keeps watch over the people of the Xeni and their territory. Pointing at or climbing Tsʼilʔos are considered disrespectful, and the Xeni Gwet’in believe that doing so will offend Tsʼilʔos, resulting in severe weather changes.

== Conservation ==
The park aims to protect black bear, mule deer, moose, mountain goat, cougar, and beaver. Ecologically sensitive animal populations found in the area include California bighorn sheep, grizzly bear, fisher, wolverine, bald eagle, and amphibian species. Sockeye salmon spawn along the shores of Chilko Lake the centerpiece of the park. The adjacent lands are also important habitat for Vaux's swift, Peregrine falcon, and Townsend's big-eared bat.

== Recreation ==
The following recreational activities are encouraged: camping, picnicking, hiking, mountaineering, swimming, kayaking, horseback riding expeditions, hunting trips and flyfishing.

== Location ==
Located 160 kilometres southwest of Williams Lake, or 250 km north of Vancouver, British Columbia.

== Size ==
233,240 hectares in size.
