= Nemaiah Valley =

- Location of Nemaiah Valley in British Columbia
- Coordinates: 51°29′00″N 123°53′00″W
- Country: Canada
- Province: British Columbia
- Area codes: 250, 778

Nemaiah Valley, also spelled Nemiah Valley and Nemaia Valley, is an unincorporated locality and First Nations reserve and ranching community between Chilko Lake and the Taseko Lakes in the Chilcotin District of the Central Interior of British Columbia.

It is the home of the Xeni Gwet'in band of the Tsilhqot'in people. Associated Indian Reserves are the Garden Indian Reserve No. 2, Tanakut Indian Reserve No. 4, Lohbiee Indian Reserve No. 3, and Lezbye Indian Reserve No.6.

The name of Konni Lake, located near the eastern end of Nemaiah Valley, is derived from the Tsilhqot'in language name Xeni.

== Origin of name ==
Nemiah was the leader [of the people who lived at Konni Lake] who first met with white chiefs 10 generations ago.
