= Sea-to-Sky Corridor =

- Subregion of British Columbia
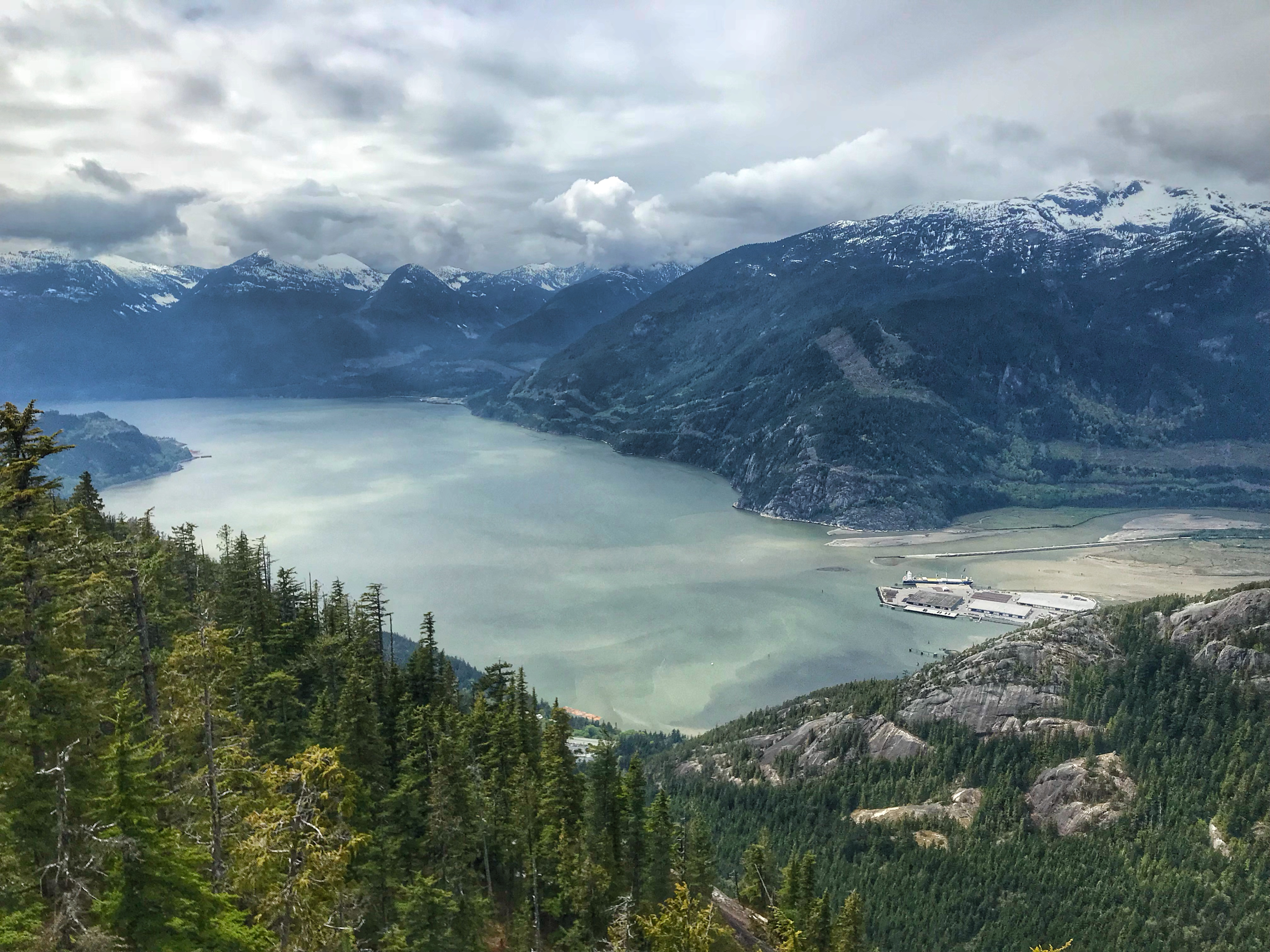
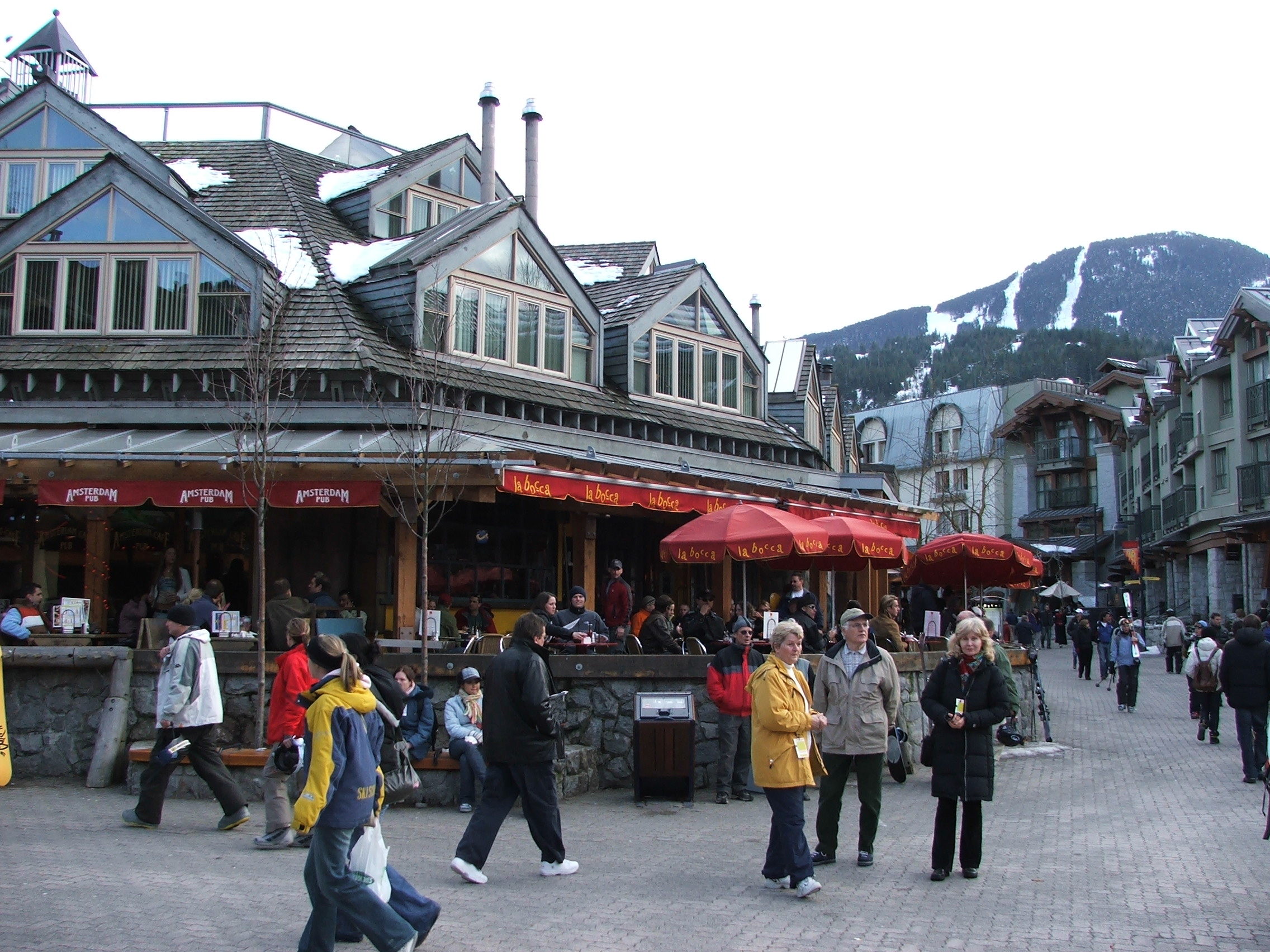
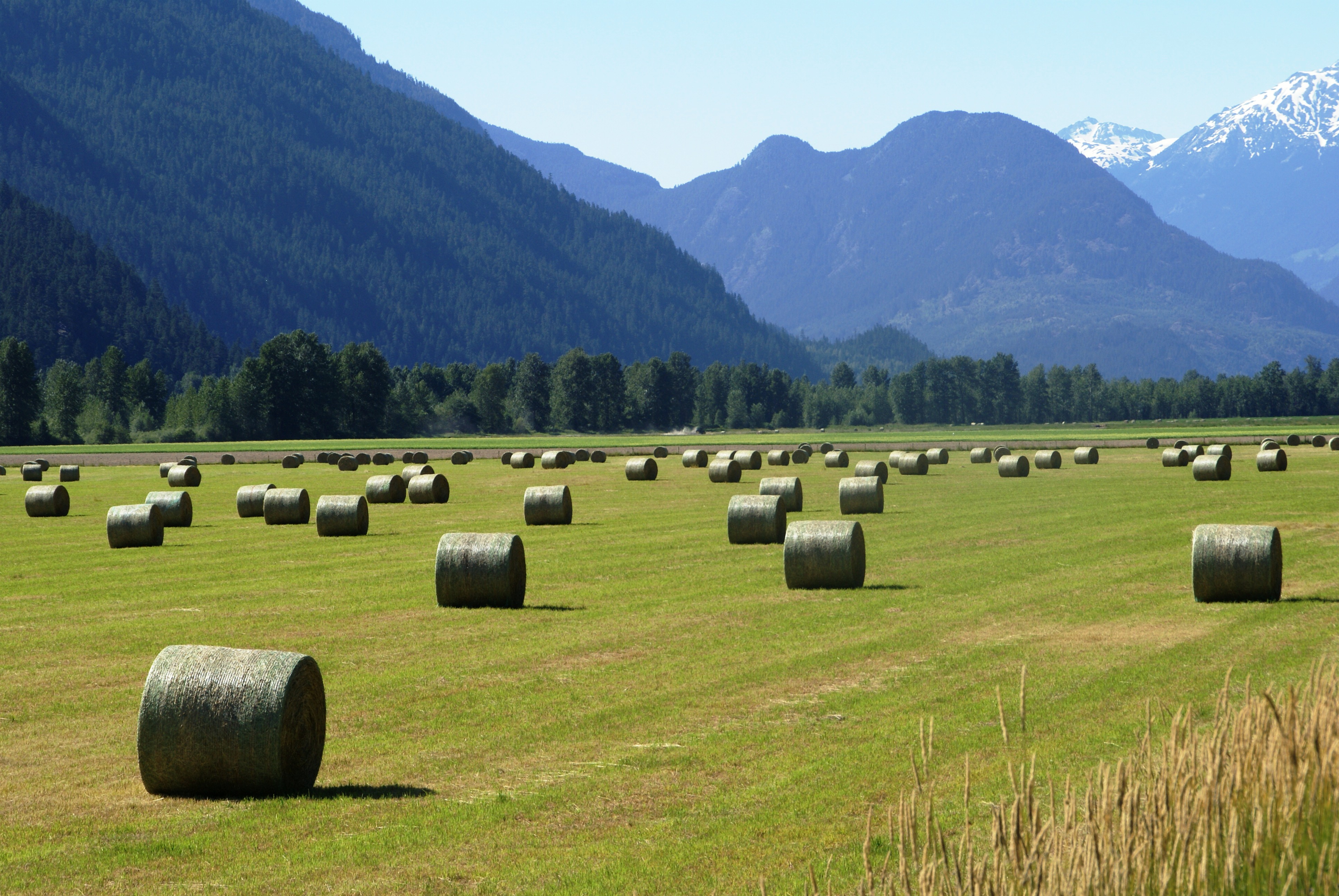
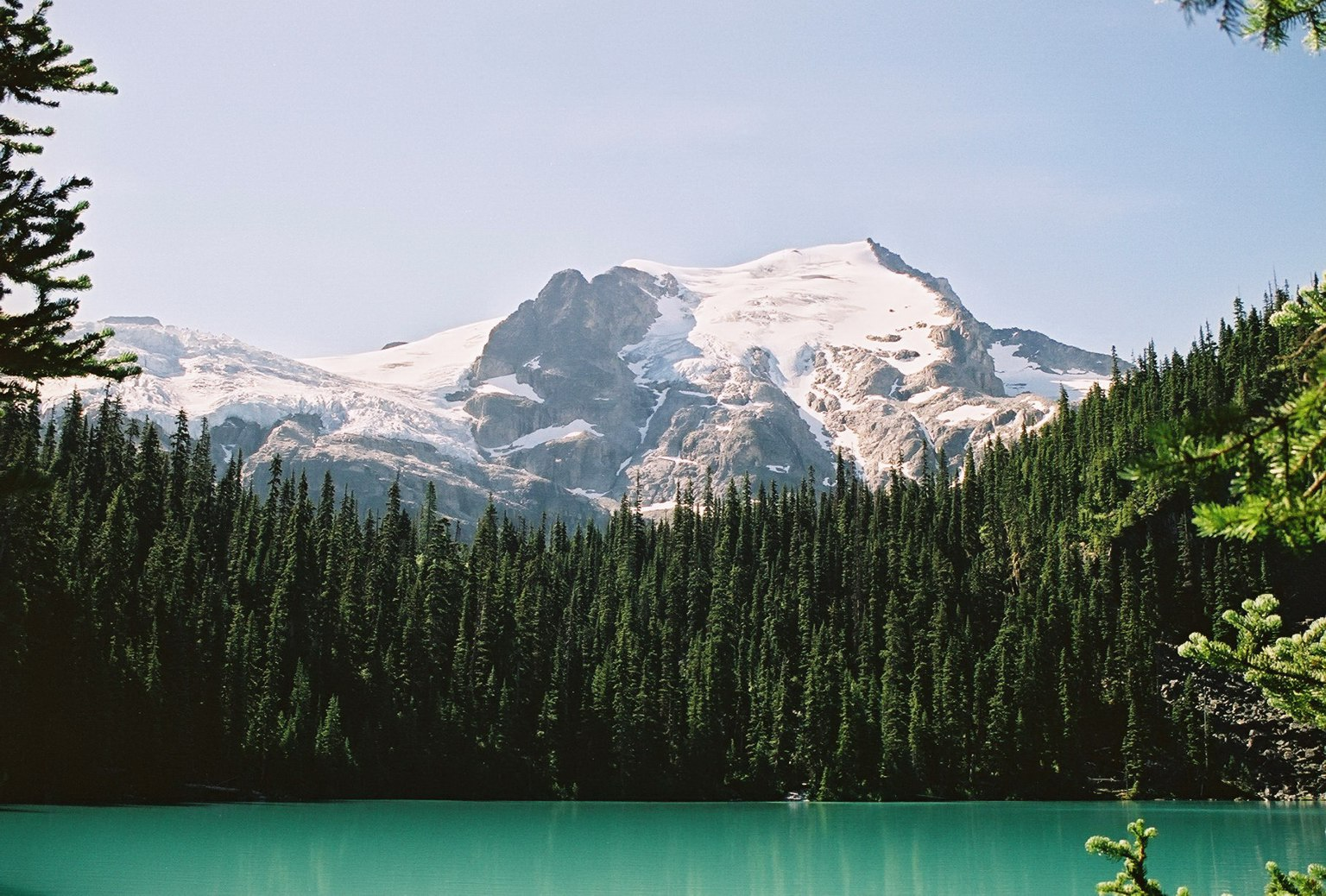
- From top, left to right: Howe Sound from Stawamus Chief Provincial Park, Whistler Village, hay bales in Pemberton Valley, Lower Joffre Lake backdropped by Joffre Peak

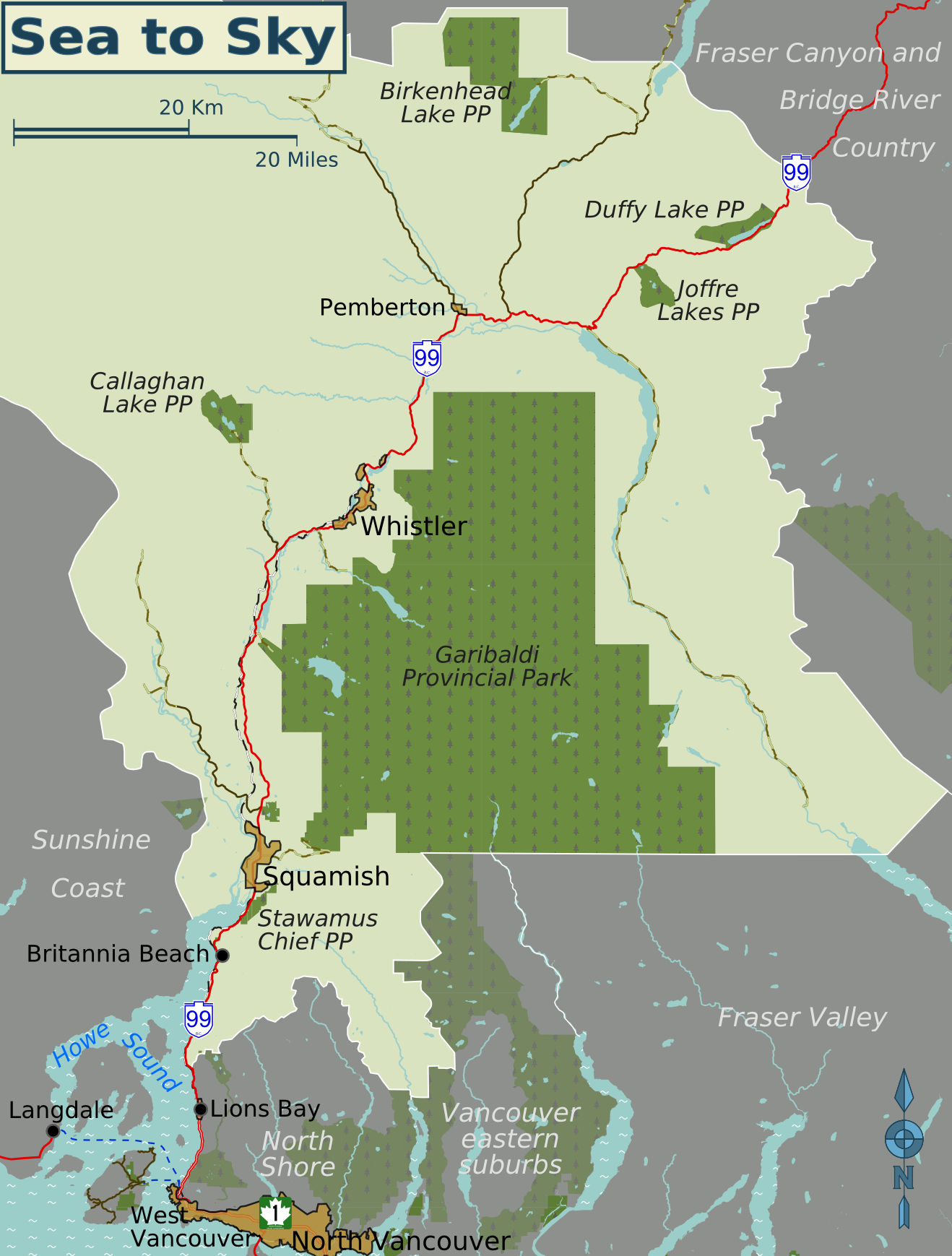
- Map of the Sea-to-Sky Corridor

- Location in British Columbia, Canada
- Coordinates: 49°56′10″N 123°10′00″W
- Country: Canada
- Province: British Columbia
- Region: British Columbia Coast

The Sea-to-Sky Corridor, often referred to as the Corridor or the Sea to Sky Country, is a region in British Columbia spreading from Horseshoe Bay through Whistler to the Pemberton Valley and sometimes beyond to include Birken and D'Arcy. From Whistler to the north, the region overlaps with the older and more historic Lillooet Country, of which Squamish, at the region's centre, was once the southward extension in the days when it was the rail-port terminus from the British Columbia Interior, via Lillooet, and accessible from the Lower Mainland only by sea. Most of the region is in the Squamish-Lillooet Regional District, although south of Britannia Beach a small part of the region is in the Metro Vancouver Regional District.

The term corridor refers to the alignment of the region's towns along Highway 99, also known as the Sea to Sky Highway, which links together the regions' three main centres: Squamish, Whistler and Pemberton. There is little development other than resource extraction outside the immediate vicinity of the highway and the towns along it, hence the linear character of the region. As with the overlap with the historical region known as Lillooet Country from Cheakamus Canyon northwards, the southern part of the region overlaps with Greater Vancouver and also with a more general and less unified but identifiable region around Howe Sound, the islands and western shore of which are respectively part of the Gulf Islands and Sunshine Coast.

== Communities ==
The Sea to Sky Country falls readily into three major subregions. These are, south to north:

=== Howe Sound–Squamish ===
- Lions Bay
- Furry Creek
- Britannia Beach
- Darrell Bay (a.k.a. Shannon Falls)
- Stawamus
- Valleycliffe
- Squamish
- Brackendale
- Chiyakmesh
- Cheekye
- Paradise Valley

=== Cheakamus–Whistler ===
- Garibaldi (abandoned/condemned)
- Pinecrest Estates
- Black Tusk Estates
- Whistler
  - Function Junction
  - Whistler Southside ("Gondola")
  - Alta Lake
  - Whistler Village
  - White Gold-Nesters
  - Mons
  - Alpine Meadows
  - Emerald Estates

=== Pemberton Valley ===
- Pemberton
- Pemberton Meadows
- Mount Currie
  - Xitolacw
  - Owl Creek
- Lillooet Lake

==== Birkenhead–Gates Valley ====
The designation Sea to Sky Highway ends at Mount Currie, though Highway 99 continues on northwards over Cayoosh Pass to Lillooet. Locations beyond Mount Currie–Lillooet Lake along the route of the rail line and the frontier-era Douglas Road are not usually considered in the Corridor, but sometimes are even though they are not on the Sea to Sky Highway. This further subregion is defined by the lower valley of the Birkenhead River and the Birken Valley and Gates Valley towards Anderson Lake. Socially and economically this area is part of or adjunct to the Pemberton subregion, though not in the Pemberton Valley:

- "No. 10 Downing Street"
- Birken-Gates Valley
- Devine
- D'Arcy (Nequatque)

== Parks ==
=== Provincial ===
- Murrin Provincial Park
- Stawamus Chief Provincial Park
- Alice Lake Provincial Park
- Garibaldi Provincial Park
- Shannon Falls Provincial Park
- Brandywine Falls Provincial Park
- Callaghan Lake Provincial Park
- Nairn Falls Provincial Park
- Birkenhead Lake Provincial Park
- Joffre Lakes Provincial Park

=== Regional ===
- Cat Lake Regional Park
- Brohm Lake Regional Park

=== Municipal ===
- Lost Lake Park, Whistler
- Rainbow Lodge, Whistler
- One Mile Lake, Pemberton
