= N'Quatqua First Nation =

Indigenous nation in British Columbia, Canada

N'Quatqua
- Band No. 556
- People: St'at'imc
- Headquarters: D'arcy
- Province: British Columbia

Land
- Other reserves: Anderson Lake 5; Nequatque 1; Nequatque 2; Nequatque 3; Nequatque 3a; Nequatque 4
- Land area: 8 km^{2} (3.1 sq mi)

Population (2024)
- On reserve: 160
- On other land: 40
- Off reserve: 186
- Total population: 386

Government
- Chief: Micah Thevarge

Tribal Council
- Lower Stl'atl'imx Tribal Council

Website
- www.nquatqua.ca

The N'Quatqua First Nation (Lillooet: nk̓ʷʔáthamx), also known as the N'quatqua Nation, the N'Quatqua Nation, the Nequatque First Nation, the Anderson Lake Indian Band, the Anderson Lake First Nation and the Anderson Lake Band, is a First Nations government of the St'at'imc (Stl'atl'imx or Lillooet) people, located in the southern Coast Mountains region of the Canadian province of British Columbia at the community of D'Arcy, where the British Columbia Railway meets the head of Anderson Lake, about midway between the towns of Pemberton and Lillooet.

== Reserves ==
Indian Reserves under the administration of the band are:

- Anderson Lake Indian Reserve No. 5, 594.6 ha.
- Nequatque Indian Reserve No. 1, effectively synonymous with the village of N'Quatqua, 177 ha., at the mouth of the Gates River into Anderson Lake.
- Nequatque Indian Reserve No. 2, 7.1 ha., on the east side of the Gates River 2 miles from Anderson Lake (at Devine)
- Nequatque Indian Reserve No. 3, 8.1 ha., on the west side of the Gates River 2 miles from Anderson Lake (at Devine
- Nequatque Indian Reserve No. 3A. 9.5 ha., on the west side of the Gates River 2.25 miles from Anderson Lake, south of and near IR No. 3
- Nequatque Indian Reserve No. 4, 8 ha., on the east side of the Gates River 6 miles from Anderson Lake

== Population ==
In 1996, the band had a registered population of 155. In 2001, the band's population had increased 9.7% to 170.

== Tribal council membership ==
Unlike most other St'at'imc governments it is not a member of the Lillooet Tribal Council, the largest grouping of band governments of the St'at'imc people (aka the Lillooet people). Also broken away from the Lillooet Tribal Council are the three bands of the In-SHUCK-ch Nation on the lower Lillooet River and at the head of Harrison Lake. The N'quatqua Nation was originally part of the In-SHUCK-ch breakaway group but has since constituted itself separately, despite close family and cultural ties to the other bands of the In-SHUCK-ch and Lillooet Tribal Council. A third tribal council, the Lower Stl'atl'imx Tribal Council, incorporates the N'quatqua First Nation with the member nations of In-SHUCK-ch.

== History of the Lakes Lillooet ==
At the farther end of Anderson Lake from Seton Portage, which is the location of three of the reserve communities of the Seton Lake First Nation, aka the Seton Lake Indian Band. Before the Indian reserve system was set in place by the Indian Act, the people of N'Quatqua and those of the various Seton Lake Band communities were considered a separate group within the Lillooet people, known as the Lakes Lillooet, Lx'lx'mx or Lexalexamux (see Chief Hunter Jack). In addition to N'quatqua, Nkiat, Slosh, Shalalth, and villages along Seton Lake now abandoned or disused, the foot of Seton Lake was also the territory of the Lakes Lillooet, in particular of the Oleman family. Since the Indian Act it has been under the control of the Lillooet Band, and is run as the public beach for Lillooet and its surrounding reserves and ranches.

== See also ==
- St'at'imcets language
