= Declaration of the Lillooet Tribe =

The Declaration of the Lillooet Tribe is an important document in the history of relations between First Nations and the governments of the Dominion of Canada and the Province of British Columbia. Signed on May 10, 1911 by a committee of the chiefs of the St'at'imc peoples, it is an assertion of sovereignty over traditional territories as well as a protest against recent alienations of land by settlers at Seton Portage, British Columbia.

Like the Nisga'a Declaration and other documents from the same period, the Declaration of the Lillooet Tribe points to the rising organization of native politicians in the lead-up to World War I, climaxing in the federal government's 1922 potlatch law, which banned the potlatch any assemblies of more than three First Nations males as a political meeting.

Today the Declaration of the Lillooet Tribe is on the table as part of the St'at'imc position, but the St'at'imc are not part of the formal British Columbia Treaty Process as is also the case with other member governments of the Union of British Columbia Indian Chiefs, which rejects the process. The smaller bands of the lower Lillooet River broke off from the Lillooet Tribal Council in order to take part in the treaty process, and are now incorporated as the In-SHUCK-ch Nation.

That group included the N'quat'qua First Nation at D'Arcy on Anderson Lake but they are now independent of both organizations and are completely self-governing, though as with the In-SHUCK-ch maintaining cultural and family links with the other communities of the St'at'imc peoples. Chiefs of communities of the In-SHUCK-ch in the following list are those from the Tenas Lake Band, the Samakwa Band (see Samahquam) the Skookum Chuck Band and the Port Douglas Band; (the Tenas Lake Band, near Samahquam, is now integrated with the others.)

== See also ==
- Aboriginal peoples in Canada
- Aboriginal land claims
- Unceded territory
