= Squamish-Lillooet Regional District =

Regional district in British Columbia, Canada

Coordinates: 50°30′00″N 123°00′00″W

Squamish-Lillooet
- Regional district
- Squamish-Lillooet Regional District
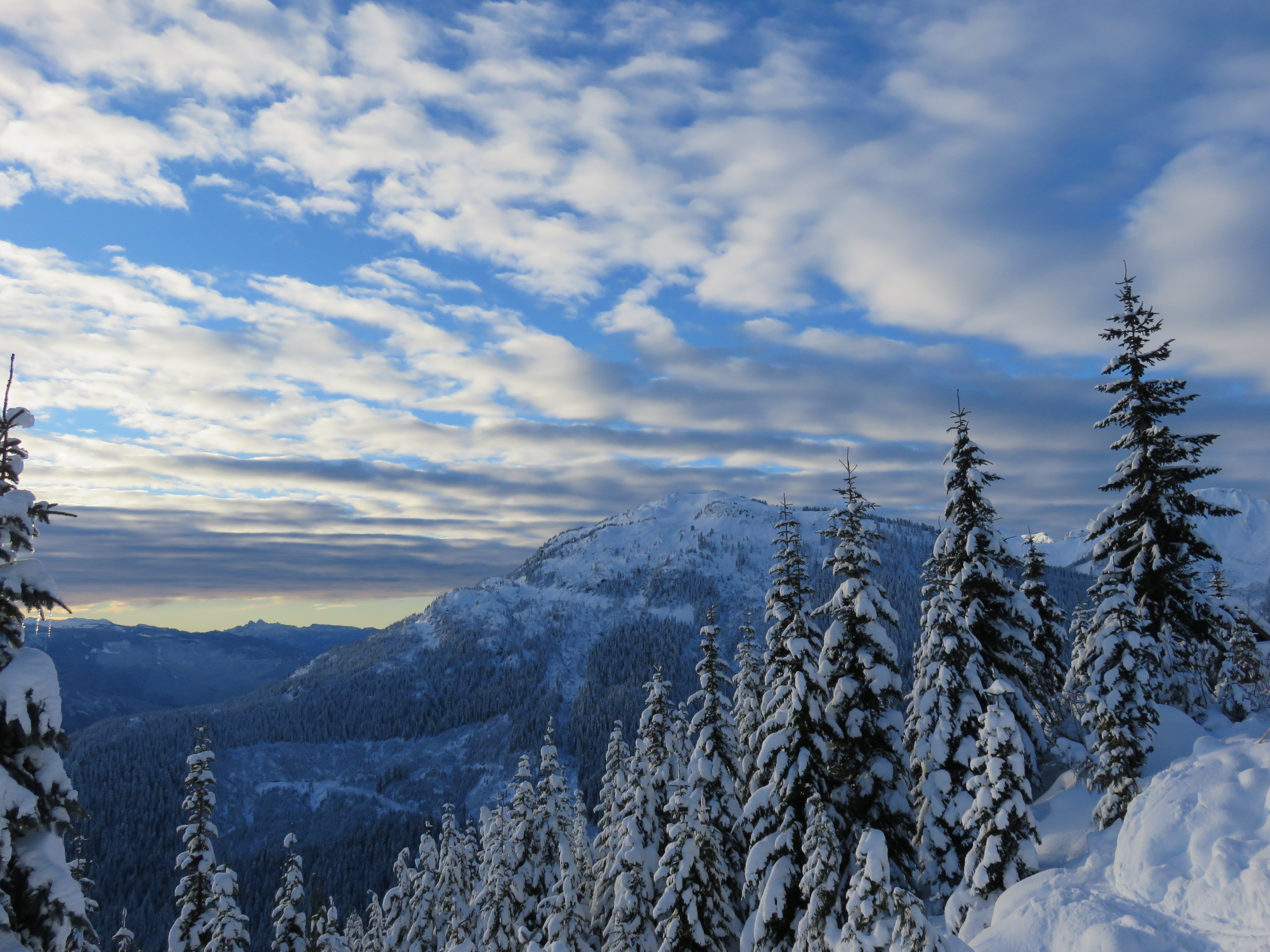
- Cloudburst Mountain

- Logo

- Location in British Columbia
- Country: Canada
- Province: British Columbia
- Administrative office location: Pemberton

Government
  - Type: Regional district
  - Body: Board of Directors
  - Chair: Jen Ford (Whistler)
  - Vice Chair: Vivian Birch-Jones(D)
  - Electoral Areas: A; B; C; D

Area
  - Land: 16,311.62 km^{2} (6,297.95 sq mi)

Population (2021)
  - Total: 50,496
  - Density: 2.62/km^{2} (6.8/sq mi)
- Website: Official website

The Squamish-Lillooet Regional District (SLRD) is a local government federation, consisting of four municipalities in British Columbia, Canada: Lillooet, Pemberton, Whistler and Squamish. It stretches from Britannia Beach in the south to Pavilion in the north. Its administrative offices are in the Village of Pemberton, although the district municipalities of Squamish and Whistler are larger population centres. The district covers 16,353.68 km^{2} (6,314.19 sq mi) of land area.

The southern end of the regional district comprises the northern part of the traditional territory of the Squamish people, and the northern half constitutes the traditional homeland of the St'at'imc people.

== Demographics ==
As a census division in the 2021 Census of Population conducted by Statistics Canada, the Squamish-Lillooet Regional District had a population of 50,496 living in 20,012 of its 26,330 total private dwellings, a change of 18.4% from its 2016 population of 42,665. With a land area of 16,296.34 km^{2} (6,292.05 sq mi), it had a population density of 3.1/km^{2} (8.0/sq mi) in 2021.

Panethnic groups in the Squamish–Lillooet Regional District (1996−2021)
| Panethnic group | 2021 | | 2016 | | 2011 | | 2006 | | 2001 | | 1996 | |
| Panethnic group | Pop. | % | Pop. | % | Pop. | % | Pop. | % | Pop. | % | Pop. | % |
|---|---|---|---|---|---|---|---|---|---|---|---|---|
| European (Note: Statistic includes all persons that did not make up part of a visible minority or an indigenous identity.) | 38,755 | 78.11% | 32,070 | 77.12% | 28,815 | 77.52% | 27,755 | 79.01% | 26,025 | 79.04% | 24,880 | 84.87% |
| Indigenous | 4,990 | 10.06% | 5,060 | 12.17% | 4,680 | 12.59% | 4,085 | 11.63% | 3,690 | 11.21% | 2,430 | 8.29% |
| South Asian | 1,725 | 3.48% | 1,495 | 3.6% | 1,240 | 3.34% | 1,725 | 4.91% | 1,845 | 5.6% | 1,240 | 4.23% |
| East Asian (Note: Statistic includes total responses of "Chinese", "Korean", and "Japanese" under visible minority section on census.) | 1,525 | 3.07% | 1,205 | 2.9% | 925 | 2.49% | 775 | 2.21% | 760 | 2.31% | 395 | 1.35% |
| Southeast Asian (Note: Statistic includes total responses of "Filipino" and "Southeast Asian" under visible minority section on census.) | 1,295 | 2.61% | 1,155 | 2.78% | 900 | 2.42% | 440 | 1.25% | 240 | 0.73% | 150 | 0.51% |
| Latin American | 530 | 1.07% | 250 | 0.6% | 185 | 0.5% | 135 | 0.38% | 95 | 0.29% | 80 | 0.27% |
| African | 350 | 0.71% | 180 | 0.43% | 250 | 0.67% | 65 | 0.19% | 135 | 0.41% | 95 | 0.32% |
| Middle Eastern (Note: Statistic includes total responses of "West Asian" and "Arab" under visible minority section on census.) | 250 | 0.5% | 70 | 0.17% | 20 | 0.05% | 85 | 0.24% | 25 | 0.08% | 25 | 0.09% |
| Other (Note: Statistic includes total responses of "Visible minority, n.i.e." and "Multiple visible minorities" under visible minority section on census.) | 205 | 0.41% | 100 | 0.24% | 150 | 0.4% | 65 | 0.19% | 100 | 0.3% | 0 | 0% |
| Total responses | 49,615 | 98.26% | 41,585 | 97.47% | 37,170 | 97.37% | 35,130 | 99.73% | 32,925 | 99.74% | 29,315 | 99.71% |
| Total population | 50,496 | 100% | 42,665 | 100% | 38,173 | 100% | 35,225 | 100% | 33,011 | 100% | 29,401 | 100% |

- Note: Totals greater than 100% due to multiple origin responses.

== Communities ==
=== Incorporated municipalities ===
| Municipality | Government Type | Population | Growth 2011-16 |
|---|---|---|---|
| Squamish | district municipality | 19,512 | 13.7% |
| Whistler | resort municipality | 11,854 | 20.7% |
| Pemberton | village | 2,574 | 5.8% |
| Lillooet | district municipality | 2,275 | -2.0% |

=== Electoral areas ===
==== Electoral Area A ====
Electoral Area A comprises the basin of the Bridge River valley above its confluence with the Yalakom River at Moha. The only towns in the area are Bralorne, Gold Bridge and Brexton. Other communities or localities include Gun Lake, Tyaughton Lake and Gun Creek Road.

Population as of 2016 Canadian Census: 186

==== Electoral Area B ====
Electoral Area B comprises the basin of the Bridge River below its confluence with the Yalakom River at Moha, the valley of Seton and Anderson Lakes (excepting D'Arcy), and the rest of the upper portion of the SLRD surrounding Lillooet and adjoining parts of the Fraser Canyon. Communities include McGillivray Falls, Seton Portage, Shalalth, Texas Creek, Bridge River (meaning Moha and the lower Bridge River communities), West Pavilion, Pavilion and Fountain and Fountain Valley.

Population as of 2016 Canadian census: 363

==== Electoral Area C ====
Electoral Area C comprises the Pemberton and Gates Valleys and the valley of the Green River north of Whistler. Communities include Pemberton Meadows, Mount Currie, Owl Creek, Birken, Devine, D'Arcy, and McGillivray (formerly McGillivray Falls).

Population as of 2016 Canadian Census: 1663

==== Electoral Area D ====
Electoral Area D comprises the valleys of the Cheakamus and Squamish Rivers and the Sea-to-Sky Corridor south to the SLRD boundary on Howe Sound. Communities include Britannia Beach, Woodfibre, Furry Creek, the Pinecrest and Black Tusk subdivisions nearer Whistler and the uninhabited former recreational settlement of Garibaldi.

Population as of 2016 Canada Census: 1057
