= Shalalth =

Community in British Columbia, Canada

- Location of Shalalth in British Columbia
- Coordinates: 50°43′37″N 122°13′01″W
- Country: Canada
- Province: British Columbia
- Region: Lillooet-Fraser Canyon
- Regional District: Squamish-Lillooet
- Area codes: 250, 778, 236, & 672

Shalalth and South Shalalth are unincorporated communities on the northern shore near the western end of Seton Lake in the Squamish-Lillooet region of southwestern British Columbia. The localities are by road about 63 kilometres (39 mi) northwest of Lillooet, but only 24 kilometres (15 mi) by rail.

== First Nations ==
The word Shalalth (pronounced Sha-LATH and spelled Tsalʼálh in Stʼatʼimcets, the Lillooet language) means simply "lake" or, particularly, the lake, meaning Seton Lake. Indigenous peoples form the majority of the population in the valley and in the Shalalth environs, which is one of the main communities of the Seton Lake First Nation Band of the St'at'imc (Lillooet) Nation. A First Nations school, small timber mill, and various small businesses operate.

In 1990s, the Seton Lake First Nation built a new residential subdivision named Ohin, further east than the traditional Shalalth rancherie area (beginning at the base of the Mission Mountain Road to a few coves east). The name Ohin, pronounced OO(kh)win meaning "frostbite", is a reminder of the bitter cold of the Seton valley in winter. The roads peters out east of Ohin. A private recreational property before the first point, and two isolated reserves on debris fans farther along, are only accessible by water or rail.

== Ferries ==
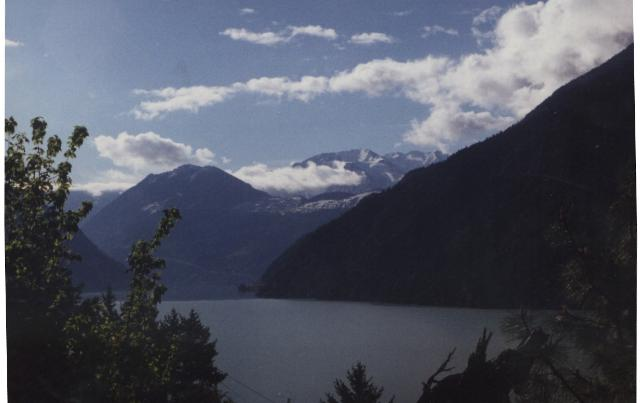
View of Seton Lake from mountainside above Shalalth.

During the Fraser Canyon Gold Rush, the Seton lake ferries on the Douglas Road bypassed Shalalth. From the 1880s, equipment for the Bridge River Country mines was barged in by lake for offloading at Shalalth. Five decades later, Ernie Marshall ran a Lillooet–Shalalth ferry until 1934 when the rail shuttle started.

Water taxi service is available on Seton Lake, but has no formal schedule or licensed service.

== Mission Mountain ==
The long gone Oblate mission at Shalalth, which was one of the earliest in the BC Interior, became known as "the Mission", providing the names for the Mission pass, ridge, and road.

A trail linked to Seton Portage, which was upgraded to a wagon road in the early 1910s.

By the late 1890s, miners were demanding that the 23-kilometre (14 mi) packtrain route northward over the pass be widened to a wagon road. On reaching the Bridge River, equipment and heavy supplies bound for the mines were rafted upstream in summer or hauled over the ice in winter. An example at this time was a stamp mill, which was sledded up from the Mission once snow fell.

Around 1912, this trail evolved into the rudimentary Mission Mountain Road. Eight-horse teams hauled freight up the steep, switchback route. It could take seven days to reach the Bridge River. The first scheduled passenger transportation was a packtrain in 1925, which also carried the mail. A 16-passenger bus was introduced in 1934.

Significant mining ended in 1971.

== Railway arrival ==
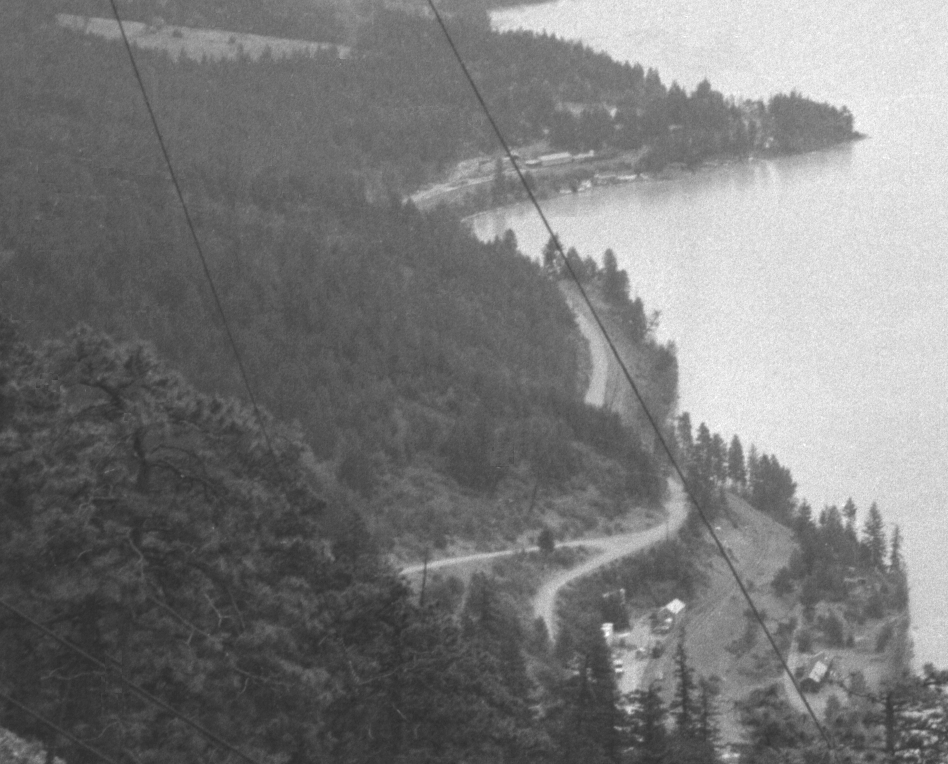
Shalalth, c. late 1940s. The buildings on the far point are the train station, shipping company offices and warehouses, a few small hostelries, and private cabins

The northward advance of the Pacific Great Eastern Railway (PGE) rail head reached the head of Anderson Lake in December 1914 and the head of Seton Lake the following month. The Bridge River (South Shalalth) train station on the west side of the bay became the new access point to the Bridge River Country goldfields.

== Hydro initiated and mining revived ==
In 1912, Geoffrey Downton, a land surveyor, stood on the 1,500-metre (5,000 ft) crest of Mission Mountain. He recognized the hydropower potential of the significant difference in elevation between the Bridge River and Seton Lake, which are only narrowly separated by Mission Ridge.

A "model village" was erected at Bridge River (South Shalalth) and work began on the 4.0-kilometre (2.5 mi) tunnel in 1927, with an expected completion date of 1930. Construction halted in 1929 with the onset of the Great Depression and the collapse of financial backing for the project. The townsite remained largely empty during the 1930s, although steady traffic to the mines kept the hotels busy.

== Railway shuttle ==
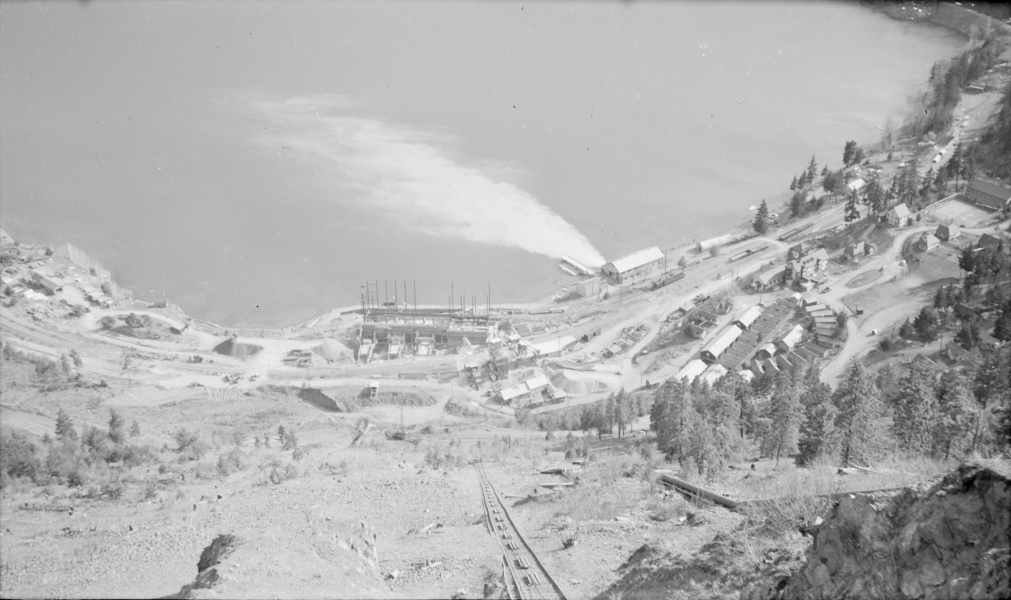
Bridge River townsite at South Shalalth during Powerhouse No. 1 construction, c. 1947

On the opening of the Bralorne Mine in 1934, the roadway from the train station was rehabilitated. PGE introduced a gas car service that September to handle increased mining traffic to/from Lillooet. Two Hall-Scott passenger cars were alternatively used to haul two flatcars, which carried vehicles and freight. Providing four round trips daily, trains loaded and unloaded on a spur at the Bridge River station. In 1936, the service reduced to two round trips. In 1938, a superior road was built down the ridge to Shalalth station, and the western terminus was moved 1.4 kilometres (0.9 mi) eastward.

Craig Lodge, built in 1915, but destroyed by fire about 1948, was an official intermediate stop prior to the hotel's demise. However, the shuttle would also stop at any of the hamlets on request. The train always remained overnight at Lillooet. In the early 1940s, the Sunday runs were eliminated. In 1958, the western terminus moved to Seton Portage. On the BC Rail main line, Shalalth, which was a key station over the decades, had become a flag stop by the 2000s. It was 6.3 kilometres (3.9 mi) northeast of Seton and 10.3 kilometres (6.4 mi) northwest of Retaskit. In 2002, BC Rail withdrew all passenger services. The indigenous operated Tsal'alh Seton Train, formerly the Kaoham Shuttle, continues to serve Shalalth.

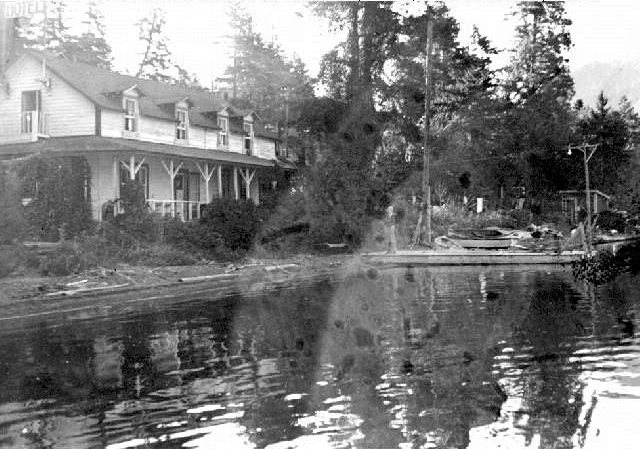
Seton House at Shalalth, 1946

Current services at South Shalalth, Shalalth, and Ohin stations
Preceding station	Tsal'alh Seton Train	Following station
Seton Portage Terminus	Tsal'alh Seton Train	Lillooet Terminus
Former services at Shalalth station
Preceding station	Canadian National Railway	Following station
Seton Portage Terminus	Kaoham Shuttle	Lillooet Terminus
Preceding station	BC Rail	Following station
Pre-2002
Seton Portage toward North Vancouver	Main line	Craig Lodge toward Prince George
Seton Portage toward North Vancouver	Cariboo Prospector	Lillooet toward Lillooet or Prince George

== Japanese internment ==
During World War II, the semi-abandoned village built for the hydro project at South Shalalth was one of four relocation centres in the Lillooet area for Japanese-Canadians from the coast. One of the relocatees at Shalalth was Dr. Masajiro Miyazaki, a US-trained osteopathic physician who remained after the war and became one of Lillooet's two Companions of the Order of Canada.

== Hydro completion ==
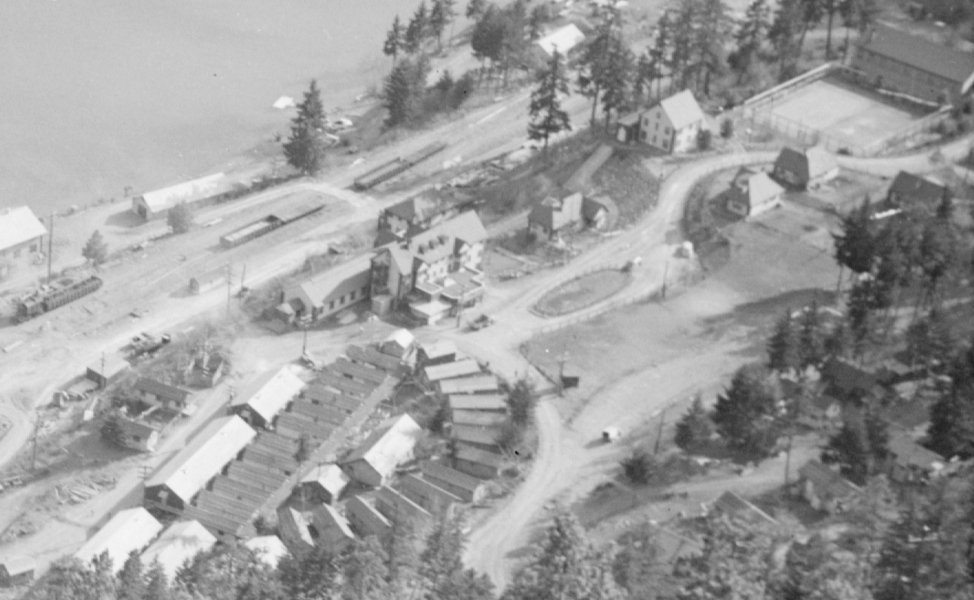
Bridge River townsite at South Shalalth – closeup of hotel and residential area, 1940s

After the war, the Bridge River Power Project resumption and a new boom in mining created a surge in traffic. For the next two decades, Shalalth was the main transportation hub in the vicinity, with nearly 24-hour heavy traffic over the pass. Accommodation included Seton House and Shalalth Lodge. Adjacent to the managers' houses and the semicircle of employee barracks, a large hotel was built above the hydro townsite train station. Hotel guests comprised not only project-related visitors but also mine visitors. The hotel burned down around 1949.

During the 1950s, the population of the townsite and the Seton Portage area mushroomed into the thousands and boosted the school enrolments into the hundreds. Other hydro townsites were located at Terzaghi Dam, Lajoie, and below the Lajoie Dam site 56 kilometres (35 mi) upriver. The activity also caused a building boom in Lillooet.

South Shalalth is the location of the two main powerhouses.

== Road access ==
Nearly all infrastructure costs for the development of the Mission Mountain Road and the Bridge River Road were born by local citizens, as was the "New Road" through the canyon from Terzaghi Dam to Moha.

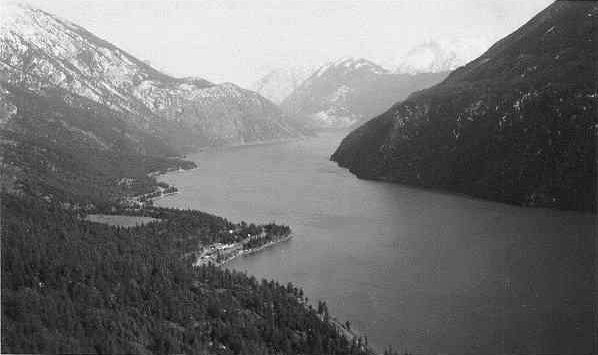
Seton Lake from Mission Mountain, c. 1950 Shalalth and Ohin on points at left. Looking west towards Mount Brew and Lillooet

A medical crisis in Bralorne, the most important of the Bridge River gold towns, at the far upper end of that valley, prompted community efforts to build a road via the Bridge River Canyon directly to Lillooet. The completion of the hydro project in 1962 reduced the importance of the Mission Mountain Road and Shalalth in turn.

Shalalth remains without easy road access, the only two routes in and out of the valley being extremely difficult mountain roads – the Mission Mountain Road, and a BC Hydro road along Anderson Lake known as the High-Line Road. This leads to D'Arcy (N'quatqua) at the far end of that lake, which connects by regular road to Highway 99 at Mount Currie, and from there to Pemberton, Whistler, Squamish and Vancouver.

The railway discourages locals from walking the track to Lillooet. Remnants of the old Lillooet Trail catwalks on the cliffs above the rail line are unsafe. Mountain goats and sheep remain common on the slopes above Shalalth, and especially along the bluffs around Retaskit and at Seton Beach, at the Lillooet end of the lake.

== Climate ==
Climate data for Shalalth (1971–2000)
Month	Jan	Feb	Mar	Apr	May	Jun	Jul	Aug	Sep	Oct	Nov	Dec	Year
Record high °C (°F)	16.0 (60.8)	15.6 (60.1)	22.0 (71.6)	27.2 (81.0)	34.5 (94.1)	38.0 (100.4)	40.5 (104.9)	38.9 (102.0)	35.0 (95.0)	29.0 (84.2)	19.0 (66.2)	17.2 (63.0)	40.5 (104.9)
Mean daily maximum °C (°F)	1.1 (34.0)	4.6 (40.3)	10.0 (50.0)	15.7 (60.3)	20.4 (68.7)	24.5 (76.1)	27.8 (82.0)	27.2 (81.0)	21.0 (69.8)	13.8 (56.8)	5.9 (42.6)	1.6 (34.9)	14.5 (58.1)
Daily mean °C (°F)	−1.8 (28.8)	1.1 (34.0)	5.3 (41.5)	9.9 (49.8)	14.1 (57.4)	18.1 (64.6)	21.0 (69.8)	20.8 (69.4)	15.7 (60.3)	9.7 (49.5)	3.2 (37.8)	−0.7 (30.7)	9.7 (49.5)
Mean daily minimum °C (°F)	−4.6 (23.7)	−2.4 (27.7)	0.5 (32.9)	4.0 (39.2)	7.8 (46.0)	11.8 (53.2)	14.2 (57.6)	14.3 (57.7)	10.2 (50.4)	5.7 (42.3)	0.5 (32.9)	−3 (27)	4.9 (40.8)
Record low °C (°F)	−26.7 (−16.1)	−21.5 (−6.7)	−15.0 (5.0)	−3.0 (26.6)	−1.7 (28.9)	3.9 (39.0)	6.0 (42.8)	3.9 (39.0)	−0.6 (30.9)	−12.5 (9.5)	−24.5 (−12.1)	−26.1 (−15.0)	−26.7 (−16.1)
Average precipitation mm (inches)	78.3 (3.08)	48.3 (1.90)	32.6 (1.28)	20.6 (0.81)	24.8 (0.98)	27.0 (1.06)	31.2 (1.23)	29.2 (1.15)	26.6 (1.05)	52.1 (2.05)	81.1 (3.19)	66.9 (2.63)	518.6 (20.42)
Average snowfall cm (inches)	31.6 (12.4)	13.7 (5.4)	3.7 (1.5)	0.2 (0.1)	0.0 (0.0)	0.0 (0.0)	0.0 (0.0)	0.0 (0.0)	0.0 (0.0)	0.9 (0.4)	9.1 (3.6)	22.5 (8.9)	81.7 (32.3)
Average precipitation days (≥ 0.2 mm)	11.9	10.4	10.0	8.8	9.3	8.3	7.4	7.5	7.6	11.1	14.4	12.6	119.3
Average snowy days	5.9	3.4	0.69	0.03	0.0	0.0	0.0	0.0	0.0	0.17	2.1	5.9	18.19
Source: Environment and Climate Change Canada
