= Lillooet Tribal Council =

The Lillooet Tribal Council is the official English name of the largest tribal council of what is also known as the St'at'imc Nation, though not including all governments of St'at'imc peoples - the term St'at'imc Nation has another context of all St'at'imc peoples, not just those within this tribal council or the tribal council itself, as the term can be used for. The Lillooet Tribal Council a.k.a. the St'at'imc Nation is the largest tribal council of the St'at'imc people (a.k.a. the Lillooet people), though a pan-St'at'imc organization, the St'át'timc Chiefs Council includes all St'at'imc bands.

== Member Bands and First Nations ==
- Bridge River Indian Band - Nxwísten or Xwisten
- Seton Lake First Nation - Tsal’álh, Ohin, Skeil, Slosh and Nkiat
- Cayoose Creek First Nation - Sekw’el’wás
- Xaxli'p First Nation - Cácl'ep or Xa'xlip
- Ts'kw'aylaxw First Nation - Pavilion Band also sp. Ts'kw'aylacw in proper St'at'imcets. Ts'kw'ey'lecw in Secwepemctsin (Shuswap) (the Pavilion Band is also culturally Secwepemc and has independent political links with the Secwepemc tribal councils, though is not officially a member).

== Declaration of the Lillooet Tribe, 1911 ==
The formal beginnings of the modern Lillooet Tribal Council are to be found in the Declaration of the Lillooet Tribe of 1911, which asserted the sovereignty of the St'at'imcets-speaking communities and disputed recent pre-emptions of land at Seton Portage by white settlers.

== Non-Lillooet Tribal Council St'at'imc groups ==
Other St'at'imcets-speaking groups within the traditional territory of the St'at'imc people are incorporated separately as

- N'quatqua First Nation, at the farther end of Anderson Lake from Seton Portage,
- In-SHUCK-ch Nation, on the lower Lillooet River south from Pemberton-Mount Currie.
  - Samahquam First Nation
  - Skatin First Nation (Skookumchuck Hot Springs)
  - Douglas First Nation (Port Douglas/Xa'xtsa).

The member bands of In-SHUCK-ch, plus the N'quatqua Band, comprise the Lower Stl'atl'imx Tribal Council. These were all formerly part of the Lillooet Tribal Council but being all smaller rural reserves opted out to make their own way through the land claims process, despite maintaining close family and cultural ties to the larger communities at Mount Currie and Lillooet.

== See also ==
- List of tribal councils in British Columbia
