= Lower Stlʼatlʼimx Tribal Council =

The Lower Stlʼatlʼimx Tribal Council is a First Nations tribal council in British Columbia, Canada, comprising four band governments of the Stʼatʼimc (Stlʼatlʼimx or Lillooet) people:

- Lil'wat First Nation
- N'Quatqua First Nation
- Semahquam First Nation
- Douglas First Nation
- Skatin First Nation

The tribal council's offices are located in Mount Currie, British Columbia.

== See also ==
- Lillooet Tribal Council (Stʼatʼimc Nation)
- In-SHUCK-ch
- List of tribal councils in British Columbia
- Stʼátʼtimc Chiefs Council
