= Gates River =

Short river in British Columbia, Canada

Coordinates: 50°33′08″N 122°28′26″W

The Gates River is a short river in the Lillooet Country of the Southern Interior of British Columbia, Canada. Approximately 14.5 km in length, it flows generally northeast from the outlet of Birken Lake (aka Gates Lake or Summit Lake) to its mouth at the head of Anderson Lake. Its main tributaries are Haylmore Creek, from the southeast, and Blackwater Creek, from the northwest, which originates near the head of Birkenhead Lake. Augmented by the waters of McGillivray Creek, Lost Valley Creek and others, its flow becomes the Seton River from the foot of Anderson Lake onwards.

The communities of the river's valley are known collectively as the Gates Valley and include Birken, Gates, Devine and D'Arcy (also known by its St'at'imcets language name Nequatque). The valley was part of the route of the Douglas Road and is the eastern half of the section of that route known as the Long Portage or Pemberton Pass.

== See also ==
- List of rivers of British Columbia
