= N'Quatqua =

Coordinates: 50°33′00″N 122°29′00″W

N'Quatqua, variously spelled Nequatque, N'quat'qua, is the proper historic name in the St'at'imcets language for the First Nations village of the Stl'atl'imx people of the community of D'Arcy, which is at the upper end of Anderson Lake about 35 miles southeast of Lillooet and about the same distance from Pemberton. The usage is synonymous with Nequatque Indian Reserve No. 1, which is 177 ha. in size and located adjacent to the mouth of the Gates River (see N'Quatqua First Nation for a list of other reserves administered by the band, some of which are also named Nequatque).

The village and its beach were at the end of pavement northeast of Vancouver and Whistler until the opening of the Duffey Lake Road stretch of Hwy 99, which runs on the south side of the Cayoosh Range which rises above N'Quatqua on the south and east. Beyond D'Arcy towards Seton Portage, at the other end of Anderson Lake, there is only a rough powerline road thousands of feet above the lake, known as the High Line Road, that is not recommended for the unwary or unsure, or the feeble of engine or nerve.

First Nations people have resided at N'Quatqua "since time immemorial" and there is little doubt that there has been human habitation at this sheltered, food-rich spot soon after the catastrophic collapse of the Cayoosh Range 8-20,000 BP that created Seton Portage and separated Anderson and Seton Lakes (the catastrophe would have created a huge wave - see megatsunami - wiping out all human populations in the valley). Prior to the diversion of the Bridge River into the Seton watershed, the salmon runs coming up the lake were as typically large as on other tributaries of the Fraser.

There were other villages in the Gates Valley, southwest from D'Arcy and up Blackwater Creek towards Birkenhead Lake, as well as at Birken but between the ravages of smallpox, an early 19th-century war with the Tsilhqot'in, the effects of the gold rush and Oblate evangelization and the Indian Act, today there is only N'Quatqua.

The N'Quatqua people were part of the Lakes Lillooet group of the St'at'imc, which included today's Seton Lake Band as well as other villages and single residences along Anderson and Seton Lakes. In the 19th century, the paramount chief of the Lakes Lillooet, or the closest thing there was to such a title, was Chief Hunter Jack (In-Kick-Tee in St'at'imcets, whose principal residence was at D'Arcy, although he often lived at Shalalth and was a habitué of the Bridge River goldfields over which he claimed suzerainty).

During the gold rush N'Quatqua was busy as a shipping and transference point on the Douglas Road and went by the name Port Anderson. The name D'Arcy was conferred in honour of Thomas D'Arcy McGee when the Pacific Great Eastern Railway was built, and that name was also applied to the alpine peak just south of "town".

N'Quatqua/D'arcy today has a mix of non-native housing and there are large recreational subdivisions in between D'Arcy and Birken. At Devine, two miles from D'Arcy, a sawmill operated in World War II by a Frank Devine employed Japanese Canadians who had been relocated from the coast to a relocation centre at McGillivray Falls, a few miles farther northeast along the north side of Anderson Lake.

== See also ==
- In-SHUCK-ch Nation
- Lillooet Tribal Council
- Lil'wat Nation
- Mount Currie, British Columbia
