= Stʼátʼtimc Chiefs Council =

Organization comprising the chiefs of all bands of the St'at'imc people

The Stʼátʼtimc Chiefs Council is an organization comprising the chiefs of all bands of the St'at'imc people, aka the Lillooet people. It is not a tribal council and includes chiefs from bands not part of the Lillooet Tribal Council. The council's mandates include issues of aboriginal title and rights and control over land and resources in St'at'imc territory.

The St'at'imc chiefs meet on a monthly basis, with political representatives from eleven communities:

- Bridge River (Nxwisten)
- Cayoose Creek (Sekw'el'was)
- Douglas (Xa'xtsa)
- Lil'wat (Mt. Currie)
- N'Quatqua (Anderson Lake)
- Samahquam
- Seton Lake (Chalath)
- Skatin (Skookumchuck)
- T'it'q'et (Lillooet)
- Ts'kw'aylaxw (Pavilion)
- Xaxli'p (Fountain)
