= Haylmore Creek =

Tributary of the Gates River in British Columbia, Canada

Coordinates: 50°32′25″N 122°29′27″W

Haylmore Creek is the largest tributary of the Gates River, flowing northwest from its origin in the central Cayoosh Range to join that river at the community of Devine, British Columbia, Canada, in the Lillooet Country of the Southern Interior of British Columbia.

Above the basins of a lower west fork and lower east fork, the upper valley of the creek is formed by three basins which back up against the spine of the Cayoosh Range along the north side of Duffey Lake, immediately south of the ridge defining the basin. The easternmost of these, that of Common Johnny Creek, is the location of Barkley Valley, a former gold-mining community, now a ghost town.

The namesake of the valley was Will Haylmore, Mining Sub-Recorder for the Bridge River Mines District. While his name is usually pronounced "HAIL-more", the creek's name is typically pronounced "HAIL-ey-more".`

== See also ==
- List of rivers of British Columbia
