= Seton Lake First Nation =

First Nation government in British Columbia, Canada

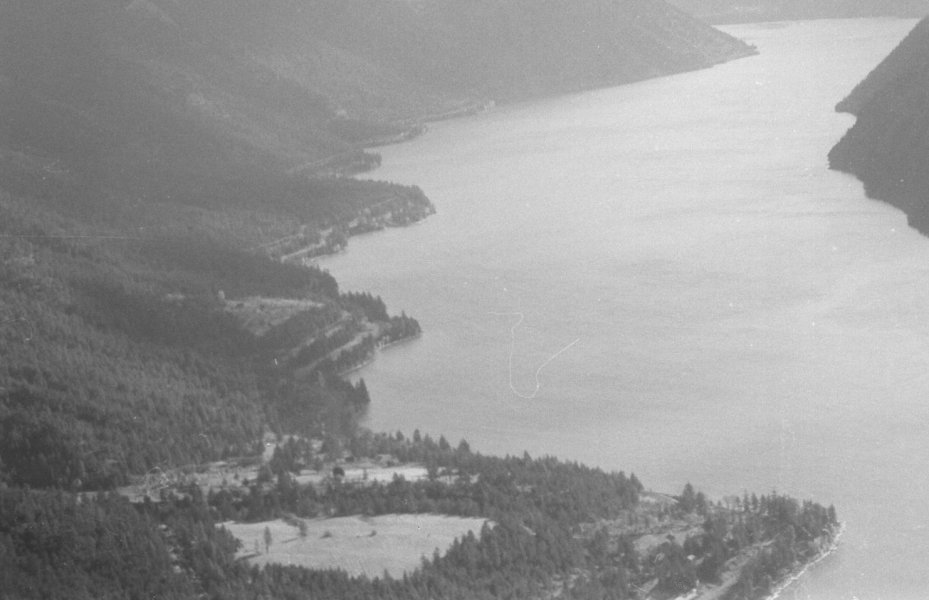
Aerial view of the Shalalth rancherie and Ohin, which are on Slosh Indian Reserve No. 1, one of the reserves of the Seton Lake First Nation

Tsal'alh, previously called Seton Lake First Nation or Seton Lake Indian Band, is a First Nations government located in the Central Interior-Fraser Canyon region of the Canadian province of British Columbia. It is a member of the Lillooet Tribal Council, which is the largest grouping of band governments of the St'at'imc people (a.k.a. the Lillooet people). Other St'at'imc governments include the smaller In-SHUCK-ch Nation on the lower Lillooet River to the southwest, and the independent N'quatqua First Nation at the farther end of Anderson Lake from Seton Portage, which is the location of three of the band's reserve communities.

The Seton Lake First Nation's offices are located at Shalalth, British Columbia, where a School District #74 public school is in operation, teaching St'at'imcets language and St'at'imc culture in addition to regular curriculum.

== Chief and Councillors ==
Chief: Ida Mary Peter

Council Members: William Alexander, Randy James, Clifford Casper, Phyllis Peters, and Tim Peter

== Treaty Process ==
There is no treaty with the Federal Government of Canada for this First Nations Band. The same can be said of many First Nations across British Columbia

== Social, Educational and Cultural Programs and Facilities ==
Seton Lake Band (in partnership with the Gold Trail School District) runs Ski'l Mountain Community School on Ski'l Mountain, Shalalth, BC. It runs a preschool program up to Grade 12, teaching local culture and language as well as the BC provincially mandated curriculum. The Rose Casper Healing Centre services the local band and community membership in areas of Social Development and Health Care. It runs several programs year round in the areas of Social Development and Community Health Care. Seton Lake Band owns and operates a gas bar offering basic vehicle maintenance services. Seton Lake Band owns and operates a shuttle passenger train which makes return trips to Shalalth's closest town, Lillooet, BC where on reserve and community members can access medical services, grocery stores, and banks.

== Indian Reserves ==
Indian Reserves under the administration of the Seton Lake First Nation are:

- Slosh Indian Reserve No. 1, 691.1 ha., north shore of Seton Lake, extending 5.5 miles east from the western end of the lake, Population in 2006: 227 50°44′00″N 122°13′00″W
- Slosh Indian Reserve No. 1A, 649.1 ha., above west end of Seton Lake, north of Shalalth. Population in 2006: 0 50°44′00″N 122°12′00″W
- Silicon Indian Reserve No. 2, 46.5 ha., on north shore of Seton Lake, 7 miles southeast of Shalalth. 50°42′00″N 122°06′00″W
- Mission Indian Reserve No. 5, 32.4 ha., west end of Seton Lake, south of and adjoining Slosh IR No. 1. Population in 2006: 51 50°42′00″N 122°17′00″W
- Seton Lake Indian Reserve No. 5A, 350.4 ha. north of Necait 6 and Mission 5. Population in 2006: 0 50°43′00″N 122°18′00″W
- Necait Indian Reserve No. 6, 31.9 ha., east end of Anderson Lake, both sides of the Seton River. Population in 2006: 16 50°42′00″N 122°17′00″W
- Whitecap Indian Reserve No. 1, 27.5 ha., northwest of Seton Portage, established 1998. 50°42′31″N 122°17′51″W

One Indian Reserve is no longer under band title:

- Seton Lake Indian Reserve No. 7, 50 ha., east side of Seton Portage, between Anderson and Seton Lakes. Established 1943, sold to the BC Electric Company in 1959. 50°42′39″N 122°16′46″W

In addition to this parcel of land, which was transferred out of Indian Reserve as part of the Bridge River Power Project, the powerhouses and townsites associated with the project are on IR No. 1A, and there are various recreational and residential leases at Shalalth, which formerly also had lodgings, shipping companies and other services.

== See also ==
- Chief Hunter Jack
- Bridge River Power Project
