= Seton Portage Historic Provincial Park =

Provincial park in British Columbia, Canada

- IUCN category II (national park)
- Location within British Columbia
- Interactive map of Seton Portage Historic Provincial Park
- Location: Seton Portage, British Columbia, Canada
- Nearest city: Lillooet
- Coordinates: 50°42′23″N 122°17′36″W
- Area: 0.7 ha (1.7 acres)
- Established: March 29, 1972
- Governing body: BC Parks
- Website: BC Parks Seton

Seton Portage Historic Provincial Park is a historic provincial park located in the community of Seton Portage, British Columbia, Canada. It was established on March 29, 1972, to commemorate the location of the first railway in the province of British Columbia.

== Geography ==
The park is located at the western end of Seton Portage between Seton Portage Road to the southeast, and a pair of railway tracks owned by CN Rail to the northwest. The Seton River lies just beyond the railway tracks, which flows northwest from Anderson Lake into Seton Lake. The park is forested with pine and the light underbrush typical of the area's climate.

Covering only 0.7 hectares (1.7 acres), Seton Portage is the smallest provincial park in British Columbia. It is also the third smallest protected area managed by BC Parks after Canoe Islets Ecological Reserve and Ballingall Islets Ecological Reserve.

== History ==
The 3 kilometres (1.9 mi) long railway was built in 1861 for transport of miners' goods on the route to the Fraser goldfields in which the Portage was an important link (then known as Short Portage). The railway was horse-drawn in the uphill direction – a difference of only 15m between the two lakes, and used gravity for its descent. Known as Dozier's Way after its proprietor, Carl Dozier, the roadbed of the route remains today as the route of most of Portage Road from Nkiat to the "downtown" of Seton Portage to Slosh, though part of its route is preserved by the historic park(Nkiat and Slosh are two First Nations villages which are where the one-time gold rush ports of Wapping and Flushing were located). Though the route was used for heavy transit again, the early railway operated only a few years, though some transport and passenger traveled through the route, despite its becoming a backwater relative to other areas of the province and the Douglas Road became forgotten.

Seton Portage received its current name in 1858, the centennial of the gold rush and the colony's creation, until which time it was known as the Short Portage – but also, with Shalalth, as "Seton". The Lillooet Cattle Trail was built through the same route as the Douglas Road but, despite an ingenious and fragile catwalk along the cliffs of eastern Seton Lake, was not usable in the long run and was abandoned and derelict by the time the Pacific Great Eastern connected the Seton communities to Lillooet in 1915.

In 1972, British Columbia Railway donated the land to BC Parks with which they created Seton Portage Historic Provincial Park. An old caboose was later parked beside the park and hosted a tourist information centre for the community under a park use permit. As of November 2012, the information centre was not in use.

== Facilities ==
The park features no camping or day-use facilities.

Passenger service to this location is no longer available, other than a local run from Lillooet, on the Canadian National Railway line. Access is otherwise via the arduous Mission Mountain Road or the even more difficult Anderson Lake Highline Road, which are Seton Portage's and Shalalth's only road access to the outside world.

== See also ==
- List of British Columbia Provincial Parks
