= Gates, British Columbia =

Gates
- Location of Gates in British Columbia
- Coordinates: 50°30′00″N 122°32′00″W
- Country: Canada
- Province: British Columbia
- Area codes: 250, 778

Gates is an unincorporated rural-recreational community in the Gates Valley of the Lillooet Country in the Southern Interior of British Columbia, Canada. It is located about midway along the length of the Gates River, between the communities of Birken and D'Arcy.
