= McGillivray, British Columbia =

McGillivray McGillivray Falls
- Location of McGillivray in British Columbia
- Coordinates: 50°37′00″N 122°26′00″W
- Country: Canada
- Province: British Columbia

McGillivray, formerly McGillivray Falls, is an unincorporated recreational community on the west shore of Anderson Lake, just east of midway between the towns of Pemberton and Lillooet, British Columbia, Canada, in that province's southwest Interior.

== History ==
McGillivray's name is derived from the names of Mount McGillivray and McGillivray Creek and its falls, which were said to be named by a miner, according to a 1911 note by Caspar Phair, Gold Commissioner for the Lillooet Mining District. A parallel account, possibly the same, says the name derives one of two placer-mining partners, McGillivray and McDonald, though the name Jack McGillivray, an early miner, also appears in records and mirrors the local pronunciation of the name (McGILL-var-ee).

According to Obituaries and Canadian Biography Volume XII are that the 2 brothers Don "Dan" McGillivray and Jack McGillivray (as above) set up company called McGillivray Bros. which participated in the building of the PGE railway between Squamish and Lillooet BC. Their sister Lady McBride was married to Sir Richard McBride, the premier of BC. In the 1880s Don McGillivray moved to British Columbia and worked for a principal contractor, Andrew Onderonk, on the construction of the main line of the CPR between Port Moody and Eagle Pass. It was said Dan showed imagination and ability in the difficult construction work in Fraser Canyon.

In the wake of the Cayoosh Gold Rush of the 1870s, prospectors fanned out over the Lillooet and Bridge River Countries, which had been largely bypassed during the Fraser Canyon Gold Rush of 1858-60 which first brought large numbers of non-indigenous people to the area. Among the successful mines which were started in the region during that period was the Brett Group Mine, which was located on a gold-bearing ledge higher on the mountainside.

Some houses today are remnants of a one-time railway-based resort and cabins which sprang up after the opening of the rail line in the early 1910s, which took the name of the waterfall a few hundred yards up McGillivray Creek from its mouth on the lake. McGillivray Falls Post Office opened 1 June 1929, closed 3 May 1961. During World War II, McGillivray Falls, as the community was then known, was one of four "self-supporting centres" in the Lillooet Country for the forced evacuation of Japanese Canadians outside a 100-mile "quarantine zone" from the Coast. McGillivray Falls was just outside the 100-mile limit, but due to the area's isolation (there was no road to the Coast before the 1960s) internees at McGillivray were hired by Andy Devine to work at his sawmill 2 miles downline from D'Arcy, at the head of Anderson Lake and itself within the 100-mile limit; the location of that mill is today the unincorporated rural settlement of Devine.

== Electoral representation ==
McGillivray is in Electoral Area C of the Squamish-Lillooet Regional District, which handles matters such as zoning and septic and construction permits. Provincially McGillivray is in West Vancouver-Howe Sound with Pemberton and Whistler though federally it is in Chilliwack—Fraser Canyon.
