= Cayoosh Gold Rush =

1880s gold rush in British Columbia, Canada

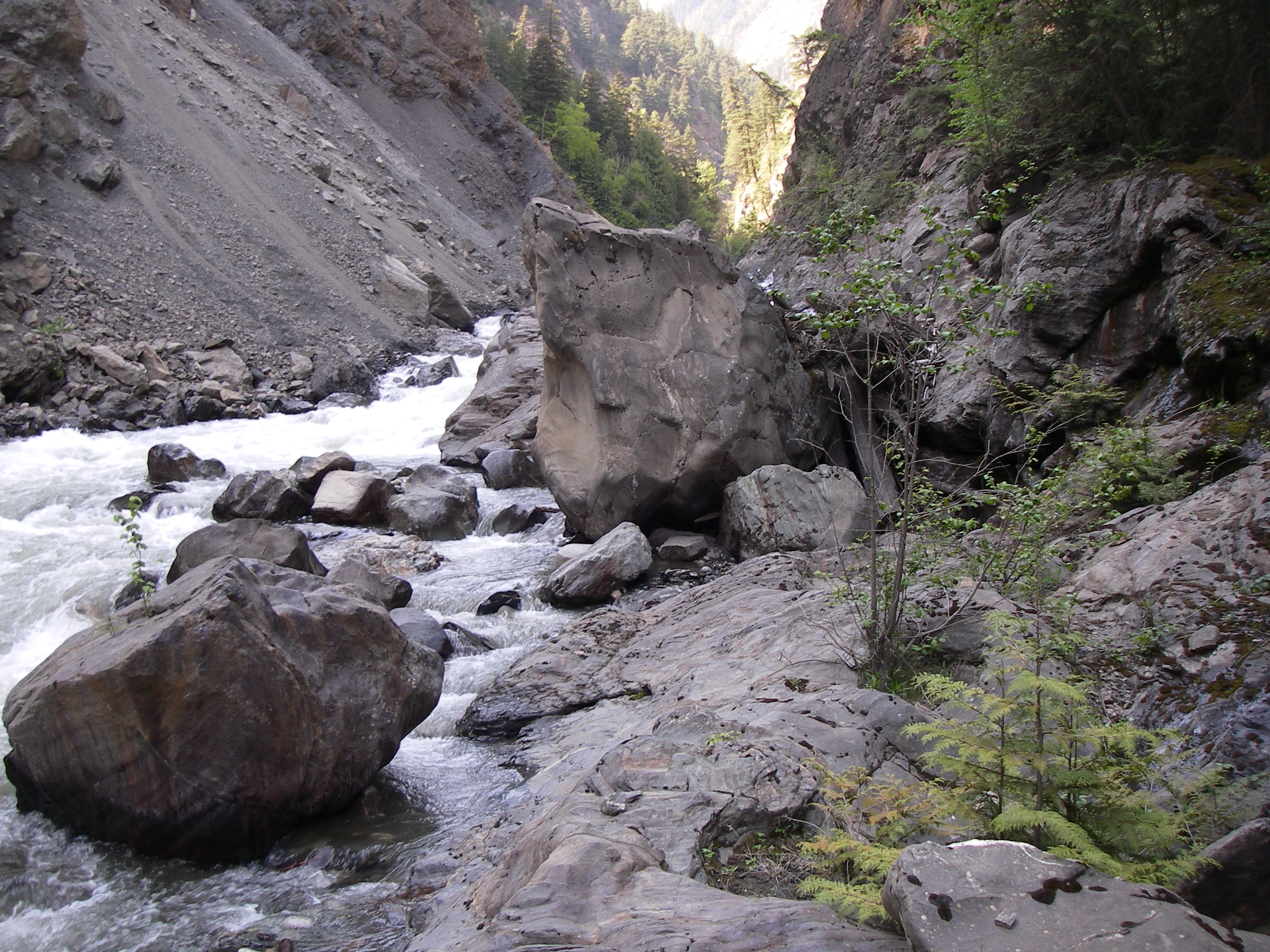
Cayoosh Creek, BC, the site of the Cayoosh Gold Rush

The Cayoosh Gold Rush was one of several in the history of the region surrounding Lillooet, British Columbia, Canada. If estimates of its yield are true, it would be one of the richest single finds in the gold mining history of that province.

Cayoosh Creek is a relatively major tributary of the Fraser River, merging with the outflow from Seton Lake before joining the larger river at Lillooet. Six miles (9.5km) upstream from that confluence was a large waterfall, Cayoosh Falls (now inundated by a private estate's small hydroelectric dam and powerplant). In early 1884 staking of gold claims on Cayoosh Creek between the falls and the Fraser began and by the end of the year there were 600 men working that section of the creek - all of which had been fully staked by the end of the year.

What distinguishes the mining activity on Cayoosh Creek from other mining operations at that time was that all of the 300 claimholders were Chinese, word-of-mouth having spread through their community throughout the Fraser Canyon and the Cariboo of the find such that all claims were staked by the time any non-Chinese found about it. Local government agent and claims recorder Caspar Phair, who presided over the issuing of claims, in 1887 estimated C$6-7 million in gold had been taken out, in a decade when the official total gold revenue for the entire province was only about C$1.5 million.

By the end of the decade the claims were exhausted but the renewed interest in the Lillooet region helped spur a wave of new exploration in the area, which had been bypassed for the most part during the Fraser Canyon Gold Rush a few decades earlier. The discovery of the famous (but largely worthless) Golden Cache Mine farther up Cayoosh Creek, the various mines of Bridge River goldfields and a profitable mine at McGillivray Falls on Anderson Lake, to the west of Seton Lake, are all the result of the Cayoosh Gold Rush.

== Sources ==
- Short Portage to Lillooet, Irene Edwards, self-published, Lillooet, various editions, out of print.
- Halfway to the Goldfields, Lorraine Harris, Sunfire Books, one edition, out of print.
- The Great Years, Lewis Green, Tricouni Books Vancouver 2001
- Bridge River Gold, Emma de Hullu and others, self-published, 1971, out of print.
