= Bridge River, British Columbia =

Coordinates: 50°44′N 122°14′W

Bridge River was used to describe three separate towns or localities in the Lillooet Country of the Interior of British Columbia connected with the river and valley of the same name.

== History ==
=== 1858-1860 ===
The boomtown of Bridge River was one of a half-dozen gold rush-era settlements which sprang up in the vicinity of today's Lillooet, the others being Cayoosh Flat (Lillooet itself), Parsonsville, Marysville, the Upper Fountain (Fountain), and Pavilion. Located at the confluence of the Bridge River with the Fraser, the location of the Bridge River Fishing Grounds (a.k.a. Six Mile or Setl) the town sprang up around a toll bridge spanning the rapids, a.k.a. the Lower Fountain, as the location of this townsite was also called. The bridge was built by an entrepreneur who tore down a First Nations-built pole bridge which had spanned the river at the same spot. The resulting town included hotels, a bank, a barber and various "restaurants" and a blacksmith's, but it vanished very quickly as the river crossing at this point did not turn out to be popular, as ferry crossings farther downstream were closer to Cayoosh Flat and Parsonsville, which were across the river from each other, and charged fares competitive with the bridge tolls. No mention is made of when the bridge was torn down, or when the last surviving remnant of the town's buildings and businesses finally closed. Nothing survives of the townsite today. On the triangle of bench above the confluence of the rivers there are a couple of old log-cabin ruins, but they are remnants of a rancherie of the Xwisten First Nation, the Bridge River Indian Band, who now mostly live farther up the Bridge River a few miles.

=== 1880s-1910s ===
The scattered population of the upper Bridge River in the days of its early exploration commonly referred to themselves as the residents of Bridge River, meaning the district and basin, although no town in the vicinity ever wore the name itself. Generally, especially in later years, residents of the upper Bridge River basin or the goldfield towns which eventually sprang up around it used the phrase "the Bridge River" to refer to the collection of communities, although as these became more well-established the specific usage to mean the upper goldfields area shifted to mean the entirety of the Bridge River Country, which includes the adjacent basin of Anderson and Seton Lakes. The residents of the lower Bridge River - below its Big Canyon - sometimes refer to themselves as living in "Bridge River" but normally will refer to the specific locality where they live - Moha, Applespring, Antoine Creek.

=== 1920s-1960s ===
The name Bridge River also become the local convention for the hydroelectric townsite of the Bridge River Power Project at South Shalalth on Seton Lake following its establishment in the 1920s. This usage fell out of use after completion of the hydroelectric project, when most residents moved away and the economic and social character of the Lillooet Country changed as a result. The townsite was a model development by the 1920s power company which launched and then abandoned the project, and included well-built beam-frame houses, a fine hotel geared at mine-bound investors, community hall, skating rink-tennis court, and landscaped gardens. Virtually empty during the 1930s the townsite became one of the five relocation centres for Japanese-Canadian internees in the Lillooet area and thereby became the temporary home of Dr. Masajiro Miyazaki, who was appointed coroner in Lillooet during the war despite his internment and became one of Lillooet's two Order of Canada inductees.

After World War II, the townsite was expanded as the power project was revived and went into full swing. In addition to new housing built on the ridgetop above the village, and extensive trailer camps and other housing at nearby Seton Portage and in Shalalth proper, and facilities in the original townsite were expanded to include large modern bunkhouses and a movie theatre, although the hotel had burned down in the early-1950s.

== See also ==
- Bridge River
- Bridge River Power Project
- List of ghost towns in British Columbia
