= Gates Valley =

Valley in British Columbia, Canada

Coordinates: 50°30′00″N 122°32′00″W

The Gates Valley is a valley and group of communities in the Lillooet Country of the Southern Interior of British Columbia, Canada, located between the summit of Pemberton Pass and the head of Anderson Lake at the community of D'Arcy. Though the term strictly refers to the valley of the Gates River, it is usually used more in a sense of the communities located in the valley and is not a term used for the river's drainage basin, which is much larger.

Gates Valley (British Columbia)

The valley was part of the route of the Douglas Road, which was built during the Fraser Canyon Gold Rush of 1858–60.

Birkenhead Lake Provincial Park is accessed from the Gates Valley, via a turnoff up Blackwater Creek near the community of Gates.

== Communities ==
The communities of the valley include:

- Birken
- Gates
- Devine
- D'Arcy/N'quatqua
