= Barkley Valley =

- Location of Barkley Valley in British Columbia
- Coordinates: 50°29′00″N 122°20′00″W
- Country: Canada
- Province: British Columbia

Barkley Valley is a former gold-mining community and now ghost town located on the easternmost fork of Haylmore Creek in the Cayoosh Range of the Lillooet Country of the Southern Interior of British Columbia, Canada.

== See also ==
- List of ghost towns in British Columbia
