= Stʼatʼimc =

Salishan ethnic group of British Columbia, Canada

St̓át̓imc
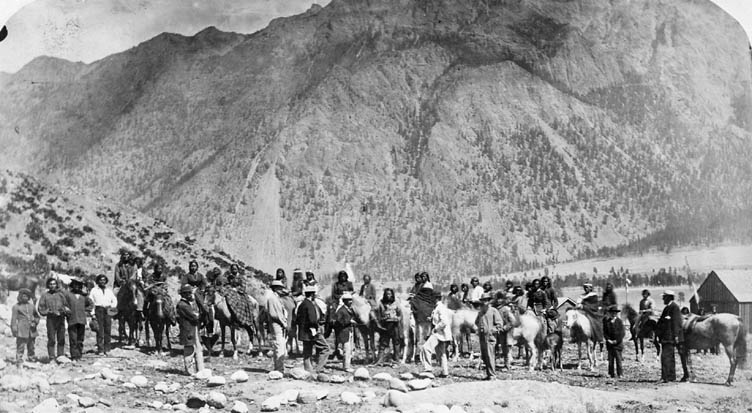

Total population
- 3,837 (2023)

Regions with significant populations
- Canada (British Columbia)

Languages
- English, Stʼatʼimcets

Religion
- Christianity, Animism, other

Related ethnic groups
- other Interior Salish-speaking peoples

The Stʼatʼimc (/stætˈliːəm/ stat-LEE-uhm; St̓át̓imc [ˈʃt͡ɬʼæt͡ɬʼemx]), also known as the Lillooet (/ˈlɪləwɛt/), are an Interior Salish people located in the southern Whale Mountains and Fraser Canyon region of the Interior of the Canadian province of British Columbia.

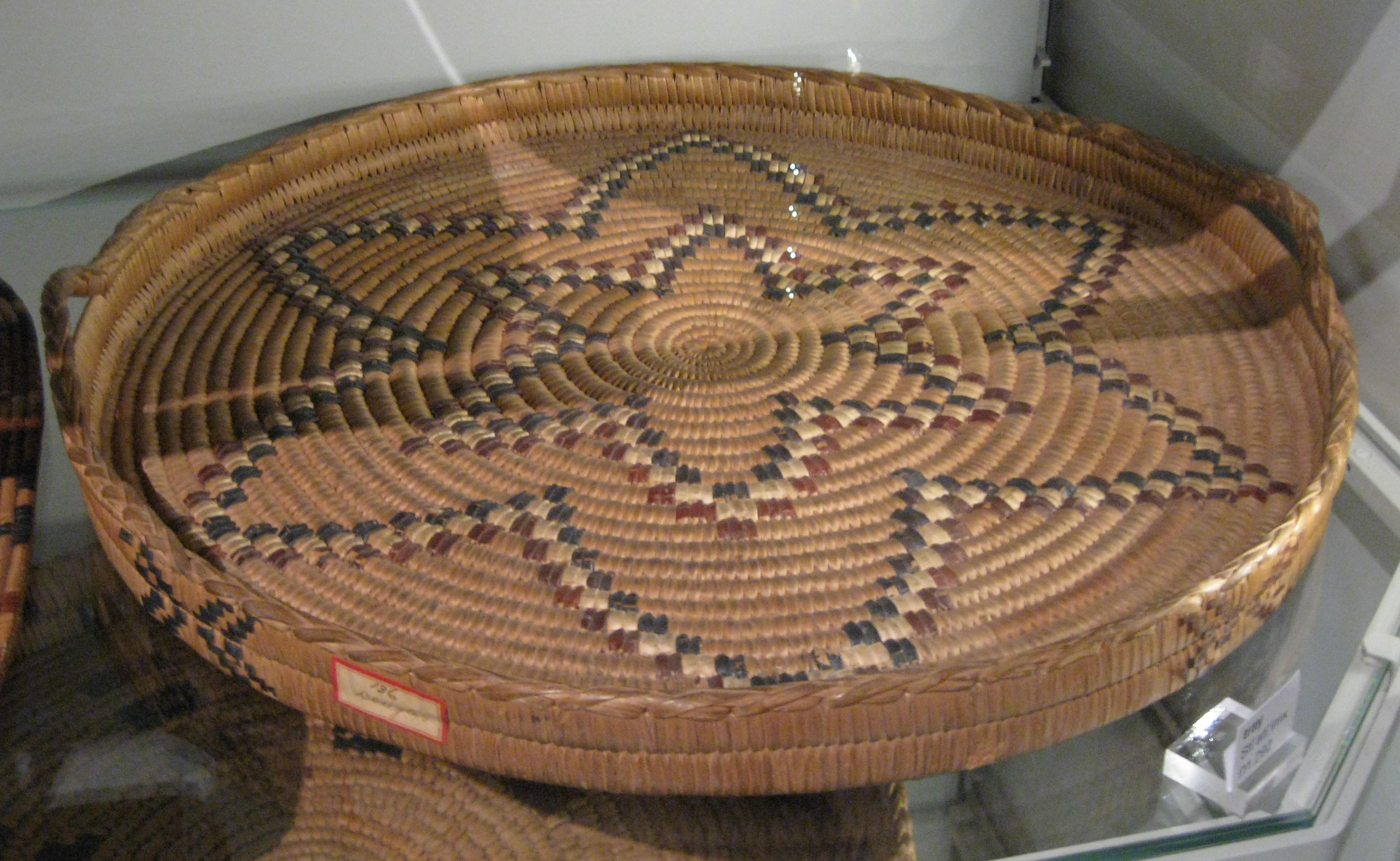
Stʼatʼimc tray at UBC Museum of Anthropology

Stʼatʼimc culture displayed many features typical of Northwest Coast peoples: the potlatch, clan names, mythology, prestige afforded the wealthy and generous, and totem poles in some communities, especially in the Lilʼwat First Nation (Lilʼwat7ul), whose tribal lands and trade routes in the Whistler Valley and Green River Valley overlapped with those of the Squamish First Nation, a Coast Salish people. Today they total about 6259.

== Groups ==
The Stʼatʼimc are divided linguistically, culturally and geographically into two main tribes or First Nations.

- The Upper Stʼatʼimc (Upper Lillooet or Fraser River Lillooet), living near the present city of Lillooet on the Fraser River. They refer to themselves as STLA'tlei-mu-wh-talk and speak Stʼatʼimcets dialect.
- The Lower Stʼatʼimc (Lower Lillooet or Mount Currie Lillooet), living in the vicinity of today's Mount Currie in the Pemberton Valley and south to Skookumchuk. They refer to themselves as LEEL'-wat-OOL – 'The true People', 'The true Lillooet' (of which were the words 'Lillooet' and 'Lilwat' derived) and speak Ucwalmícwts dialect.
- The Lakes Lillooet (Lexalexamux or Tsala'lhmec – 'Lake People'), a group only sporadically recognized, living between the territories of Upper Stʼatʼimc and Lower Stʼatʼimc around Seton Lake and Anderson Lake – whose descendants are today's N'quatqua First Nation (also known as Anderson Lake Indian Band) and Seton Lake First Nation (also known as Seton Lake Indian Band), historically a group at the foot of Seton Lake, near Lillooet, known as the Skimka'imx were also included in this group.

=== Lower Stʼatʼimc ===
Lillooet woman.

Lillooet man.

- the Lil'wat First Nation, their traditional territory extended south to Rubble Creek in the Cheakamus River drainage, near Garibaldi townsite, north to just below Anderson Lake, east to the Upper Stein Valley and west to the Toba Inlet of the Pacific Ocean, in total approximately 780,000 ha, the current community Mount Currie (or Lilwatʼul) is the heart of the Lil’wat Nation territory
- the Xa'xtsa First Nation (also known as the Douglas First Nation), Xa’xtsa (pronounce: ha-htsa) is made up of two communities: Port Douglas at the northern end of Little Harrison Lake, about 90 km northeast of Vancouver, and their main community Tipella, on the west side of the Lillooet River, southernmost of the In-SHUCK-ch communities, and also of the entire St’atl’imx linguistic group (/ˈhɑːtsə/)
- the Skatin First Nations (pron. /skɑːˈtiːn/), at Skookumchuck Hot Springs on the Lillooet River, the community is located on the east side of the Lillooet River, on the 19-Mile Post of the old Harrison-Lillooet wagon road (about 35 kilometres from the head of Harrison Lake), before the arrival of European settlers, this community was considered to be the largest on the lower Lillooet River, comparable in size to the pre-contact village of present-day Mount Currie of the Lil'wat First Nation
- the Samahquam First Nation (/ʃəˈmɑːkwəm/) (‘warm place out of the cold’, pronounced: 'shah-MAH-kwum'), returned to their reservation lands in the early 1990s and constructed the Baptiste Smith community, at the southwest end of Little Lillooet Lake (aka Tenas Lake, derived from the Chinook Jargon tenass – 'little') on the Lillooet River system. They once occupied both sides of Little Lillooet Lake.

The tiny and remote communities of Samahquam, Xa'xtsa and Ska'tin Bands collectively, including the Tenas Lake Band, seceded from the larger Lillooet Tribal Council (now called the Stʼatʼimc Nation) at the same time to join the N'quatqua First Nation at (D'Arcy) to form the In-SHUCK-ch Nation. Since the 1980s these First Nations called themselves Nsvq’tsmc ('In-SHUCK-ch micw'), derived from Nsvq’ts – 'split like a crutch', the name of the holy mountain, now called In-SHUCK-ch Mountain (also called Gunsight Mountain).

=== Upper Stʼatʼimc ===
The tribal territory of the different groups of the Upper Stʼátʼimc extended west of the Fraser River from the mouth of the Pavilion Creek (′Sk'elpáqs′) to the Texas Creek in the mountains above the Bridge River and westward through the valleys of Seton Lake and Anderson Lake to Duffey Lake. The territory of the Upper Stʼátʼimc east of the Fraser River included the Three Lake Valley (also known as Fountain Valley) and the adjacent mountains and stretched towards the Hat Creek, a tributary of the Bonaparte River.

The Upper Stʼátʼimc settled in several main settlements on the banks above the Fraser River and on the banks of the Seton and Anderson Lake — probably the word 'Stʼátʼimc' is derived from a former village Tʼatʼlh on Keatley Creek. Previous there were the following communities: Sk'ámqain on the shore of Seton Lake, Satʼ at the site of present-day city of Lillooet, Nxwísten at the mouth of the Bridge River, Xáxlip (′Fountain′), Slha7äs and Tsal'álh along Seton Lake and Nk'wátkwa on the western shore of Lake Anderson. Beside those significant settlements there have been several smaller villages. In Pavilion (Tsk'wáylacw), a mainly ethnically and linguistically Secwepemc settlement in the 19th century, since the beginning of the 20th century this community speaks usually Stʼatʼimcets, but their particular dialect is a hybrid of Stʼatʼimcets and Secwepemctsin, because there had been many mixed marriages between Secwepemc and Stʼátʼimc, know forming the Tsk'weylecw'mc or Pavilion Indian Band.

- N'quatqua in D'Arcy. Also known as the Anderson Lake Band and one of the original members of the breakaway In-SHUCK-ch Nation, although now on its own from that organization and from the Lillooet Tribal Council, despite close family ties to the various bands of that organization. Located at the head of Anderson Lake, northeast of Pemberton. Historically the N'Quatqua and Tsalalh bands were one group, the Lakes Lillooet or Lexalexamux, and included a group at the foot of Seton Lake, near Lillooet, known as the Skimka'imx.
- Tsaľálh (Shalalth), Skeil, Ohin, Lh7us (Slosh) and Nquayt (Nkiat). Lh7us and Nquayt are at Seton Portage, Skeil, Ohin and Shalalth farther east along Seton Lake. All of these are collectively self-governed within the Lillooet Tribal Council as the Seton Lake First Nation.
- Sekw'el'wás in Lillooet (Cayoose Creek/Pashilqua Reserves)
- Tʼítʼq'et in Lillooet, also spelled Tl'itl'kt (Lillooet Reserve)
- Nxwísten in Lillooet (Bridge River Indian Band)
- Cácl'ep near Lillooet (pron. /ˈhɑːlɪp/ and also spelled Xa'xlip) Fountain Indian Band.
- Tsk'weylecw (in an older spelling used in Stʼatʼimcets called Tsk'waylaxw, also known as the Pavilion Indian Band and located at Pavilion, which is between Lillooet and Cache Creek on the lip of the Fraser Canyon and at the outlet of the karst landscape forming Marble Canyon, beyond which are the territories of the Bonaparte Band of the Secwepemc (Shuswap) peoples, who are part of the Shuswap Nation Tribal Council.

== History ==
They had several types of dwellings—long plank houses, winter earthlodges, and summer bark- or mat-covered lodges, not unlike those at the Keatley Creek Archaeological Site. Salmon and other fish were the basis of the economy, and numerous animals (bear, sheep, caribou, deer, and small mammals) were hunted and trapped, and berries and fruit were gathered. Warfare with other groups was unusual, with intensive intertribal trade the more typical state of affairs. The Tsilhqot’in-St’at’imc war was one brutal war for the St’at’imc and threatened their survival as a nation. The Tsilhqot’in raided all 11 bands of the Stʼatʼimc and took women and children as slaves. Both nations met at many roots (Graveyard Valley) in the St’at’imc territory at which the Stʼatʼimc were victorious. Chief In-Kick-Tee (Hunter Jack) was the warchief in that battle and made a peace treaty in 1845.

=== Declaration of the Lillooet Tribe ===
The declaration of the Lillooet Tribe was made in 1911 in Spences Bridge and is the nation's declaration of ownership over lands that had been seized by non-native settlers at Seton Portage at the onset of the 20th century, and is considered a general statement of principle regarding ownership of all traditional territories of the Stʼatʼimcets-speaking peoples. The Declaration of the Lillooet Tribe is the Lillooet Tribe's first formal declaration to the world of the tribes status as a Country, in International terms, as they understood them at that time. The Declaration is mentioned as the foundation document of all the various organizations of the Lillooet Tribe in place today, such as the Stʼatʼimc Chiefs Council, Lillooet Tribal Council and the In-SHUCK-ch Nation. The Declaration brings the tribe together at the grassroots level as a Country.

== Language ==
The ancestral language of the Stʼátʼimc people is Lillooet (also known as Stʼatʼimcets, also spelled St̓át̓imcets or sometimes even Sƛ̓áƛ̓imxəc, pronounced [ˈʃtɬʼætɬʼɪmxətʃ]), a member of the Interior Salish group which includes the languages of the neighbouring Secwepemc (Shuswap) and Nlaka'pamux (Thompson) peoples.

== Bibliography ==
- Joseph, Marie. (1979). Cuystwí malh Ucwalmícwts: Ucwalmícwts curriculum for beginners. Mount Currie, B.C.: Ts’zil Publishing House. ISBN.
- Larochell, Martina; van Eijk, Jan P.; & Williams, Lorna. (1981). Cuystwí malh Ucwalmícwts: Lillooet legends and stories. Mount Currie, B.C.: Ts’zil Publishing House. ISBN.
- Smith, Trefor. Our Stories Are Written on the Land A Brief History of the Upper Stʼátʼimc 1800–1940. Lillooet, BC: Upper Stʼátʼimc Language, Culture and Education Society, 1998. ISBN 1-896719-08-2
- van Eijk, Jan P. (1991). Cuystwí malh Ucwalmícʷts: Teach yourself Lillooet: Ucwalmícwts curriculum for advanced learners. Mount Currie, B.C.: Ts’zil Publishing House. ISBN.
- van Eijk, Jan P. (1997). The Lillooet language: Phonology, morphology, syntax. Vancouver: UBC Press. ISBN.
- Williams, Lorna; van Eijk, Jan P.; & Turner, Gordon. (1979). Cuystwí malh Ucwalmícwts: Ucwalmícwts curriculum for intermediates. Mount Currie, B.C.: Ts’zil Publishing House. ISBN.
