= In-SHUCK-ch Nation =

First Nations tribal council in British Columbia, Canada

The In-SHUCK-ch Nation, also known as Lower Lillooet people, are a small First Nations tribal council on the lower Lillooet River south of Pemberton-Mount Currie in the Canadian province of British Columbia. The communities of the In-SHUCK-ch are of the St'at'imcets-speaking St'at'imc people, but in recent years seceded from the Lillooet Tribal Council to form their own organization. The name In-SHUCK-ch is taken from In-SHUCK-ch Mountain (Ucwalmicwts: In-SHUCK-ch, meaning 'it is split'), a distinctive mountain near the south end of Lillooet Lake.

The three bands of the In-SHUCK-ch are:

- Semahquam First Nation
- Skatin First Nations
- Douglas First Nation

Joined with the In-SHUCK-ch in the Lower Stl'atl'imx Tribal Council is the:

- N'Quatqua First Nation of D'Arcy

== British Columbia Treaty Process ==
By August 2007, the In-SHUCK-ch Nation Agreement in Principle had been officially signed by In-SHUCK-ch Nation Chiefs, the provincial Minister of Aboriginal Relations and Reconciliation Michael de Jong and the federal Minister of Indian and Northern Affairs Chuck Strahl on behalf of their governments.

Land provided to In-SHUCK-ch Nation will be approximately 13,208 ha of provincial Crown land and 1,310 ha of In-SHUCK-ch Nation's current Indian Reserves. Canada and British Columbia are also negotiating to acquire 59 ha of private land. The capital transfer will be $21.0 million ($2005).

== See also ==
- List of tribal councils in British Columbia
- St'át'timc Chiefs Council
