= McGillivray Creek (British Columbia) =

Creek in Lillooet Country, Canada

Coordinates: 50°37′00″N 122°26′00″W

McGillivray Creek is a creek located in the Interior of British Columbia, in the Lillooet Country.

The creek originates in the Cadwallader Range, below Prospector Peaks, and flows southeast into Anderson Lake near D'Arcy, which is about midway between Pemberton and Lillooet along the rail line.

It originates at an elevation of 2,100 m (6,900 ft), while the mouth lies at an elevation of 270 m (890 ft). McGillivray Falls, on the lower reaches of the creek, is a notable waterfall in the district and is the namesake of the one-time railway-lakeside resort, McGillivray Falls, British Columbia, which is located at trackside around the creek's mouth. During World War II, this was one of four communities in the Lillooet Country which were "self-supporting" centres for Japanese-Canadians ordered away from the Coast.

== History ==
McGillivray Creek was named for Archie McGillivray (born 1829), who settled to ranch at Campbell Creek near Kamloops early in the 20th Century, and was active in racing circles. During the 1890s the Brett Group Mine near the falls was an important speculation and rich producer during the years of its operation. Near the creek's headwaters at McGillivray Pass a jade and silver prospect by Delina Noel kept her from taking the time to travel to town to receive a provincial award.

== See also ==
- List of rivers of British Columbia
