= Cariboo Prospector =

Cariboo Prospector Cariboo Dayliner
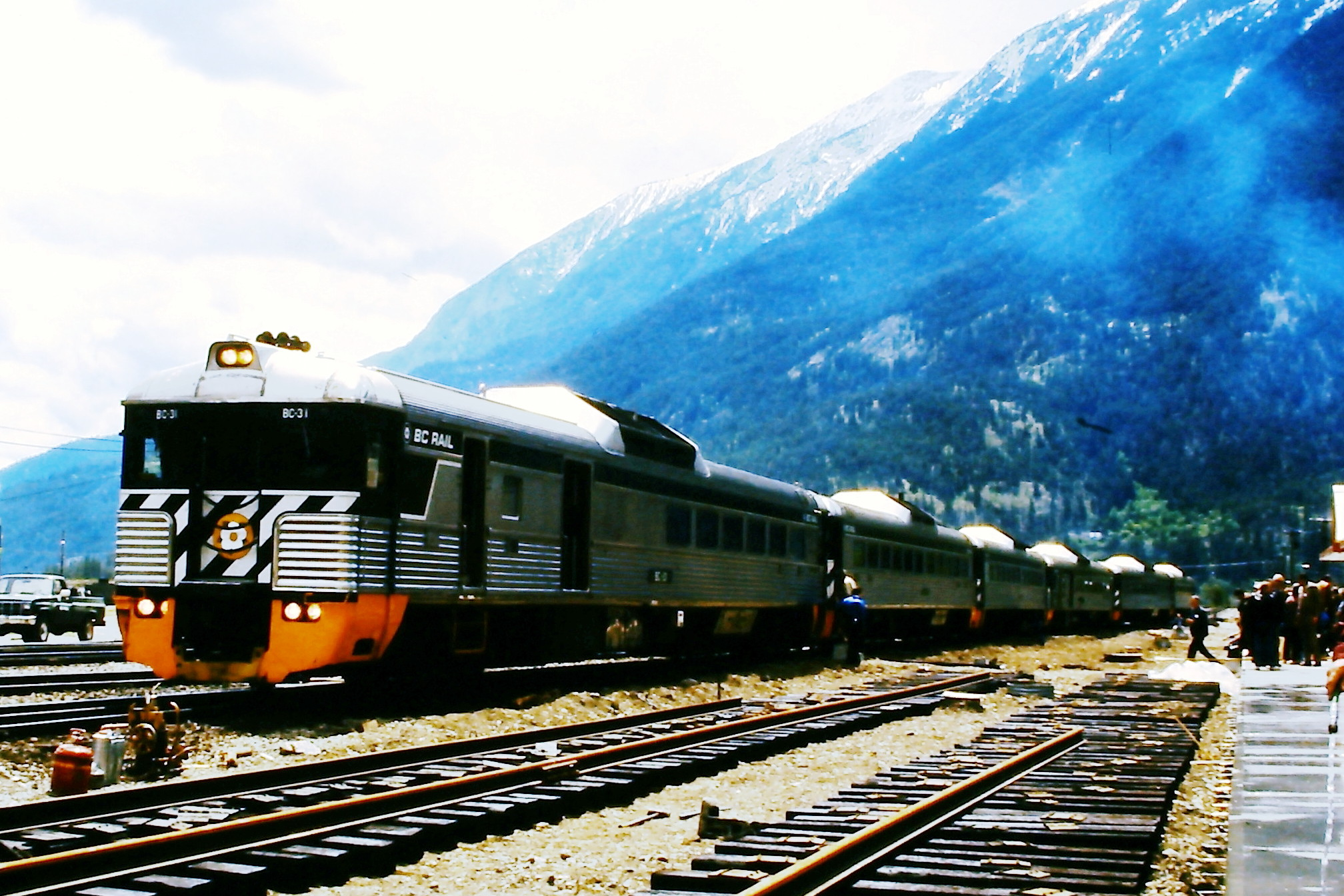
- BC Rail's Cariboo Dayliner in Lillooet

Overview
- Status: discontinued
- Locale: British Columbia, Canada
- First service: 1915
- Last service: 2002
- Successor: Kaoham Shuttle for part of the route
- Former operators: BC Rail, previously Pacific Great Eastern

Route
- Termini: North Vancouver; Lillooet and Prince George

The Cariboo Prospector, also named the Cariboo Dayliner, was a passenger train service in British Columbia, Canada, from North Vancouver to Lillooet and Prince George. It used Budd Rail Diesel Car trains and was operated by the Pacific Great Eastern, later known as the British Columbia Railway Company and then BC Rail. It debuted in 1915.

The train ran from BC Rail's North Vancouver railway station, formerly located on 1311 West First Street at the foot of Pemberton Avenue in North Vancouver, and ran to Lillooet railway station. From there a section was split from the train that would continue down to Prince George BC Rail station located in BC Rail's Prince George yards. The Cariboo Prospector carried 81,000 total passengers in 2001 and had an operating loss of $4.8 million for that year; the Budd Rail fleet had also reached the end of its useful life by then. The service ended along with the other BC Rail passenger trains on October 31, 2002, due to the operating costs and need for new cars. A 60-kilometre (37 mi) section serving the line between Lillooet, Seton Portage, and D'Arcy was replaced by the Kaoham Shuttle.
