= Seton Portage =

- Unincorporated community
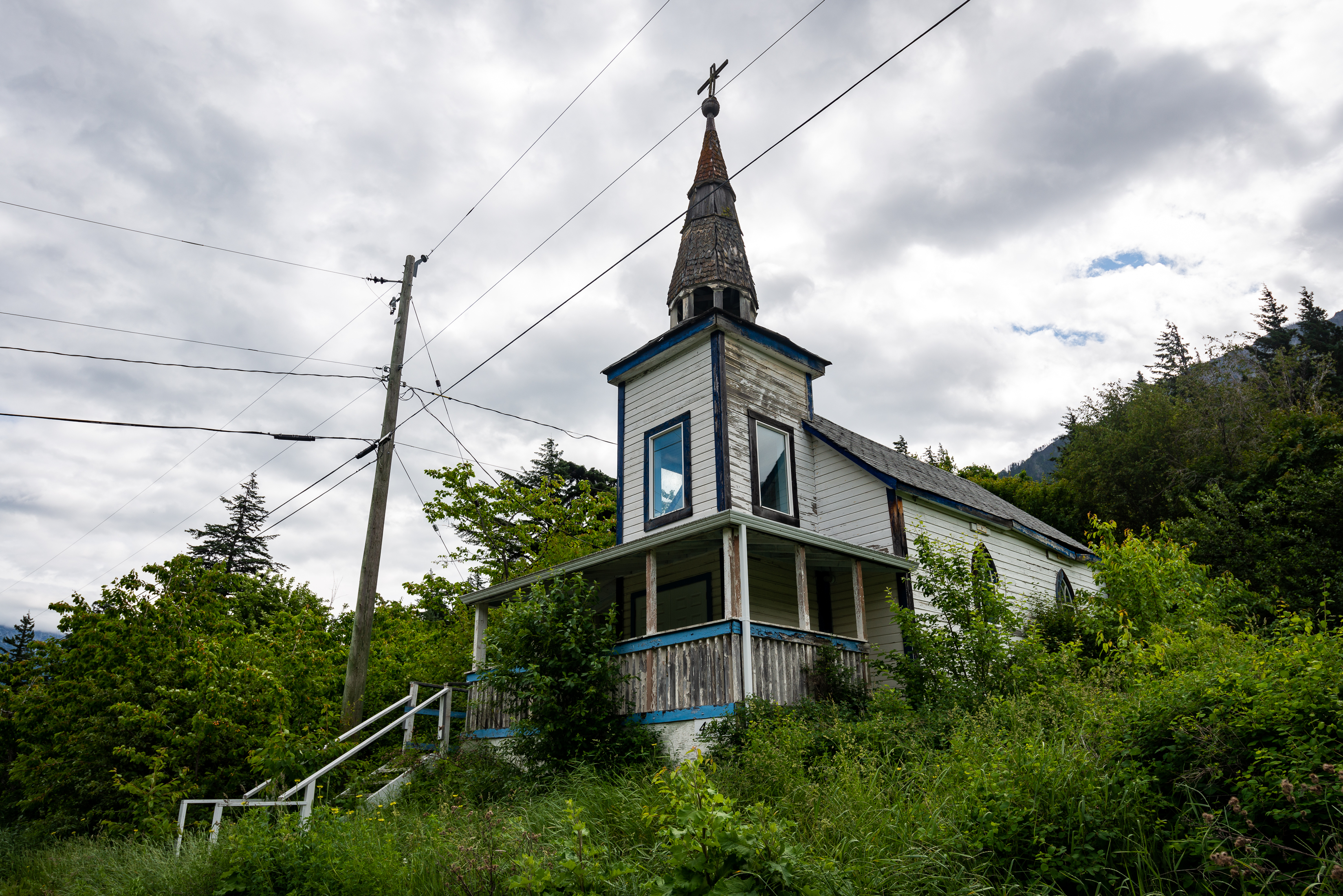
- Church in Seton Portage

- Location of Seton Portage in British Columbia
- Coordinates: 50°42′26″N 122°17′20″W
- Country: Canada
- Province: British Columbia
- Regional District: Squamish-Lillooet
- Time zone: UTC−07:00 (PT)

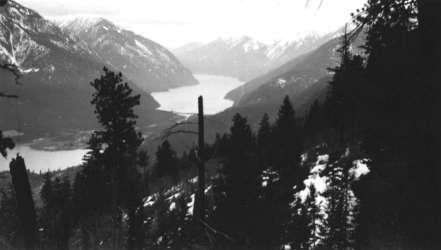
View of Seton Portage from Mission Mountain with Anderson Lake (centre) and Seton Lake (lower left), c. 1950

Seton Portage (/ˈsiːtən ˈpɔːrtədʒ/) is a community on a narrow strip of land between Anderson Lake and Seton Lake in Squamish-Lillooet Regional District, British Columbia. The community is home to two Seton Lake First Nation communities at either end of the portage and a non-native recreational community between them. Local services include a post office, fire department, library, and general store, among other small businesses. The community is also the location of Seton Portage Historic Provincial Park, a small provincial park protecting a historically significant stretch of railway.

== Geology ==
"The Portage" was formed about 10,000 years ago when the flank of the Cayoosh Range, which is the south flank of the valley, let go and slid into the middle of what had been a single lake. The result is a location similar to Interlaken, Switzerland, with two fjord-style lakes flanking a narrow and very short strip of land between them. Remnants of old lake bottom survive as benchlands lining the north banks of Seton and Anderson Lakes. It may be that the glacial moraine at the foot of Seton Lake, which had been at the foot of the Seton Glacier and, after it melted, dammed the older, larger lake in until the slide and its destructive wave (see megatsunami). The inundation then washed part of it away to open Seton Creek and drain the glacial melt to today's lake level, or close to it (since the lake level is 10–12 feet higher because of the power project completed in 1958).

== Archaeological issues ==
Much of neighbouring Shalalth is on these alluvial benches, but Seton Portage is entirely situated atop the rubble of the great slide, but covered with good soils from the inroads of vegetation over the millennia. Prior to the Fraser Canyon Gold Rush and the Portage's role as a key component in the Douglas Road - the sheltered and fertile land of the Portage had been home to what are estimated to have been hundreds of quiggly holes (kekuli, meaning "underneath" in the Chinook Jargon), each of which had been a house with multiple residents.

One witness to the pre-Gold Rush Portage told of coming over the mountain pass which leads into the valley from the north, and looking down on the Portage looked like "many stars in the sky". Such a description suggest a very large population, but no one knows for sure, and between smallpox and other foreign diseases, raids from neighbouring tribes in pre-Contact decades (see Nicola's War) and ensuing famine, the St'at'imc were already reduced in population before the impacts of colonialism and industry reduced them even further.

Because of agriculture and placer activity, all signs of pre-Contact St'at'imc settlement on the Portage were obliterated. Two 1890s-vintage churches built by the Oblate Fathers, and some of the adjacent log-cabin rancheries, still stand today though the one at Slosh, St. Christopher's, is in a state of decay. Heritage-preservation funding has enabled the band to restore the church at Nkait.

== Population history ==
Population estimates of the pre-Contact populations of the Lakes Lillooet people widely vary, with some traditions into the thousands on the Lakes alone. No one knows for sure, and the archaeological record here would be impossible to explore, as the land where the evidence would be has been stampeded and dug up and plowed under many times over, even on the rancheries.

As concerns the Gold Rush-era population, there is no figure for how many men were on the Portage at any one time, only an oft-repeated number of 30,000 as to the number of men that traversed the Lakes Route in the heat of the Gold Rush. The beaches of the Portage were so busy with men coming and going that they were given the names Wapping and Flushing, after the busy London Tube stations of the same names. Within a few years that traffic had disappeared (see Douglas Road) and the non-First Nations population of the Portage from then until the arrival of the Oblates in the 1880s was few, if any at all, although travellers still occasionally used the route of which the location was intrinsically a part.

The first non-native settlers since the Gold Rush occupied lands at the Portage in the early 1900s, which provoked the Declaration of the Lillooet Tribe (May 10, 1911) protesting the land alienations at "the Short Portage". Further settlement came with the building of the Pacific Great Eastern Railway, which was open through the Lakes by 1914 and which required the housing and feeding of hundreds of men, and with that the beginnings of the Bridge River Power Project.

During the late 1940s and 1950s, the construction boom caused by the renewal of that project after World War II brought thousands of long-term temporary residents into the valley, with many of these living in temporary trailer camps and prefab houses in the Portage. Following the end of that project, the non-native population has dwindled to 400, cresting to 500 in summer with seasonal residents and visitors. Band population in total, including Shalath and the Portage together, is about 500.

== History ==
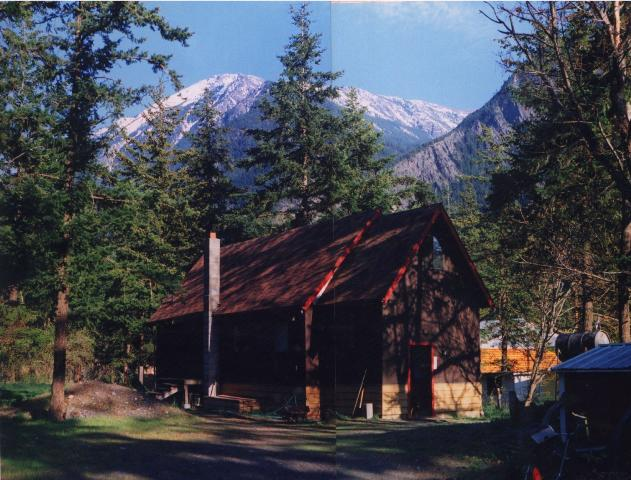
Private home in Seton Portage, summer 1990

The area was traversed by two Hudson's Bay Company employees in 1828, a journey which was later followed in 1846 by Scottish explorer Alexander Caulfield Anderson, who had been assigned to chart it and for whom Anderson Lake is named. Certain placenames along the route were conferred by Anderson later on, at the request of colonial Governor James Douglas. Seton Lake, and hence Seton Portage, was named for a friend of Anderson's who had perished in the sinking of HMS Birkenhead. Farther along Anderson's route to the Coast to the southwest, which later was to become the Douglas Road, there is a Mount Birkenhead, the Birkenhead River and Birkenhead Lake, and also the rural community of Birken and a lake of the same name. Birken Lake is the summit lake of Seton Portage's big twin, the Long Portage, aka Pemberton Pass, which separates the Birken and Seton drainages.

In 1858, gold was discovered in British Columbia. Steamships started running on both Seton Lake and Anderson Lake, and Seton Portage became a transportation bottleneck, as prospectors would need to portage for two kilometres (1.2 mi) between the lakes. In 1861, Carl Dozier constructed British Columbia's first railway here to transport passengers and freight across Seton Portage (then called Short Portage). Most likely the "railway" - known as Dozier's Way - was drawn by horses and mules in one direction, and run on gravity in the other - was not used much after the colonial government built the Cariboo Road through the Fraser River canyon, in 1864, via Ashcroft, which bypassed Seton Portage and Lillooet, and was abandoned shortly thereafter (c. 1870) although its roadgrade survives today as the main local thoroughfare, Portage Road.

Following the Fraser Gold Rush, the Seton valley lapsed into obscurity until the 1890s, when gold exploration scoured the region in the wake of the Cayoosh Gold Rush of the 1880s. Alienation of native land by white settlers at the outset of the 20th century led to the Declaration of the Lillooet Tribe, an assertion of native ownership and sovereignty by the chiefs of the St'at'imc in 1916. In 1914, the Pacific Great Eastern Railway was built through Seton Portage and its twin community Shalalth, which is farther east along Seton Lake.

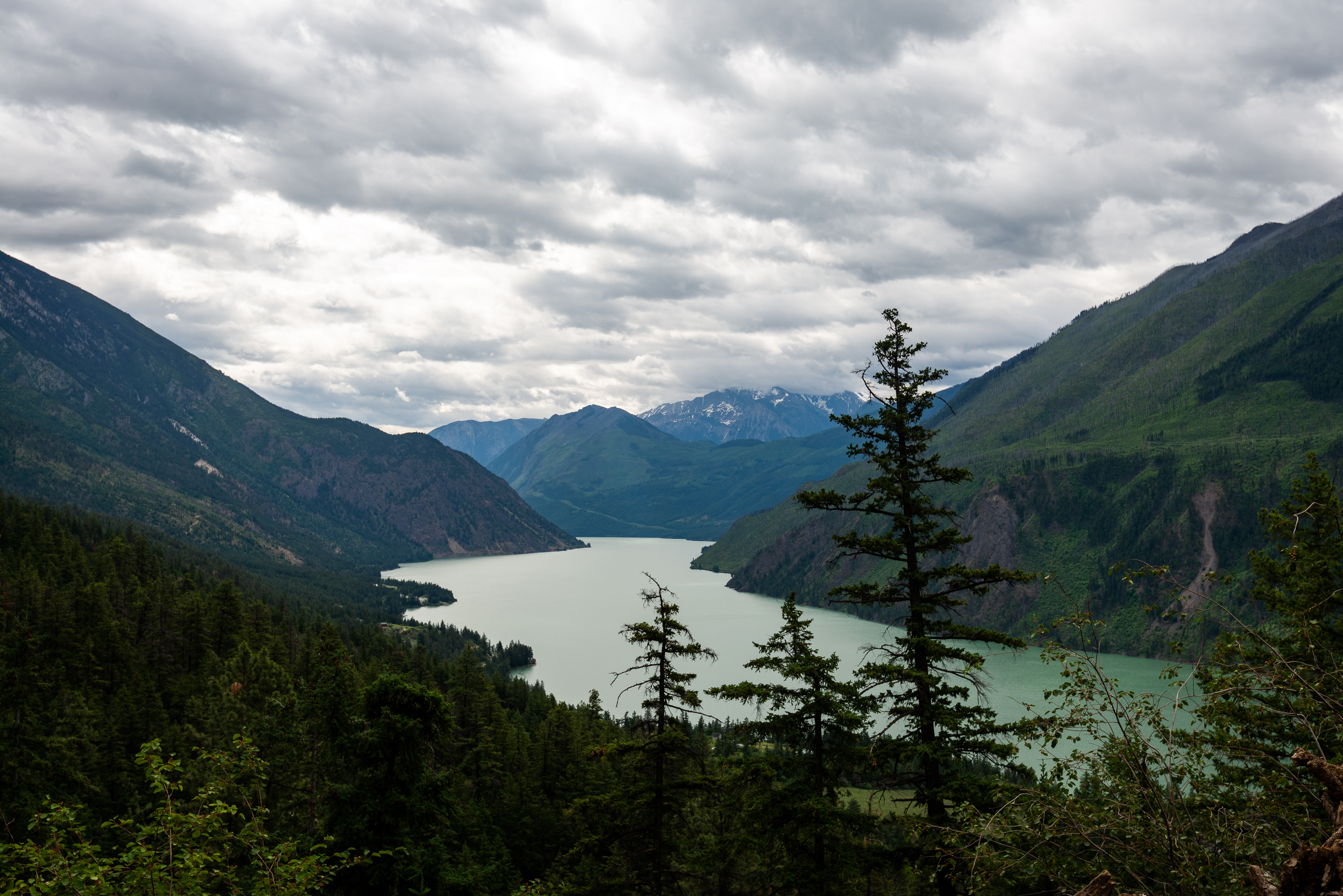
View of Seton Lake from the hills above Seton Portage.

The valley became an important food supply for the booming goldfields in the Bridge River from the 1920s to the 1950s because of its lower elevation (255 metres or 837 feet) and hence warmer climate and long growing season (favorable enough for bigleaf maple at the northeast corner of its natural range). The locality is known for its fine fruit-growing weather - McIntosh apples grown here are considered some of the best in the world, but there is only one commercial orchard today. During the construction of the Bridge River Power Project, the population of the Portage boomed and hundreds of temporary houses and barracks were brought in to house workers and their families. It was during this period that festivities surrounding the 1958 Centennial of the province of British Columbia saw Short Portage renamed Seton Portage. Local parlance already referred to the valley simply as "Seton", a term still in use today that collectively describes Seton Portage, Shalalth and the remaining hydro company townsite at South Shalalth (formerly known as Bridge River after the name of the project, not because it was on that river).

== Land claims issues ==
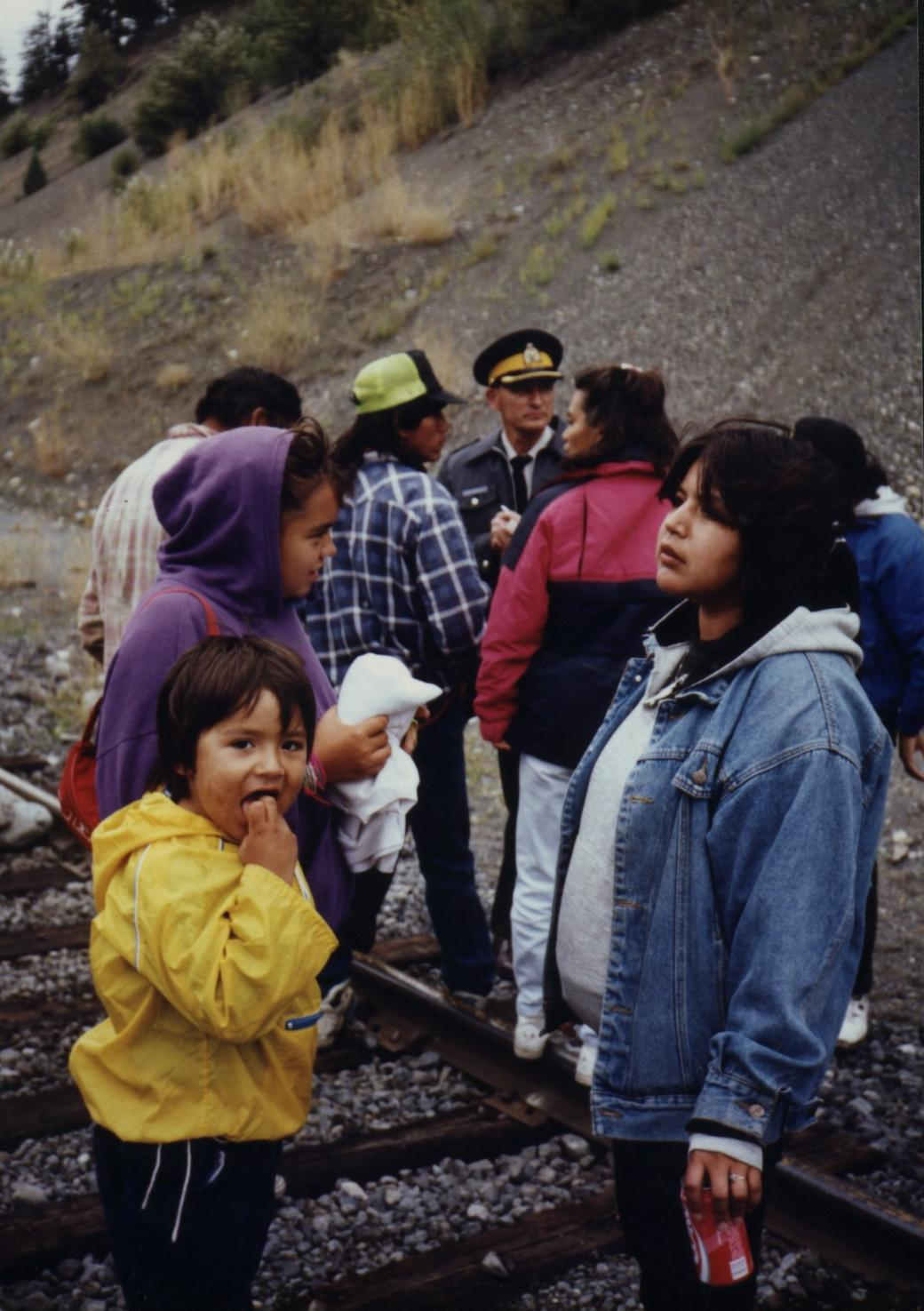
Blockade the BC Rail line during the Oka Crisis

The railway line at Seton Portage was blockaded in August 1990 by members of the Seton Lake Indian Band (population: over 500), a branch of the St'at'imc Nation, who were demonstrating in support of the Mohawks during the Oka Crisis. A day or two after a visit by then-Premier William Vander Zalm, the blockade was suppressed by the Royal Canadian Mounted Police. The event was covered by provincial and national television news media and led to province-wide protests in support of native land claims. Shortly afterward, the main railway bridge in Seton Portage was destroyed by an arsonist.

== Access ==
Access to "The Portage" is via a 1,100-metre-high (3,500 ft) pass from the Bridge River known as the Mission Mountain Road, or a 25 km (16 mi) powerline road from D'Arcy at the farther end of Anderson Lake known as the High Line and in recent times dubbed the Douglas Trail, in reference to the old Douglas Road route from Harrison Lake to Lillooet. There is no road connection along Seton Lake, but that route is used by the British Columbia Railway (now CN); the Seton Lake First Nation operates a railbus, the Kaoham Shuttle, between the Seton communities, beginning at the Seton Portage railway station to and from Lillooet, which is at the farther end of the lake. The service sometimes goes to D'Arcy by prior arrangement.

| Preceding station | Tsal'alh Seton Train | Following station |
Current services at Seton Portage
| Terminus | Tsal'alh Seton Train | South Shalalth toward Lillooet |
Former services
| Preceding station | Canadian National Railway | Following station |
| Terminus | Kaoham Shuttle | Shalalth toward Lillooet |
| D'Arcy Limited service Terminus | Kaoham Shuttle | Shalalth toward Lillooet |
Pre-2002
| Preceding station | BC Rail | Following station |
| Marne toward North Vancouver | Main line | Shalalth toward Prince George |
| Curries toward North Vancouver | Cariboo Prospector | Shalalth toward Lillooet or Prince George |
