= Samahquam First Nation =

Samahquam First Nation, a.k.a. the Semahquam First Nation are a band of the In-SHUCK-ch Nation, a subgroup of the larger Stʼatʼimc people (the In-SHUCK-ch are also referred to as Lower Stlʼatlʼimx). The Douglas, Skatin and Samahquam communities are related through familial ties as well as culturally and linguistically. They are the southernmost of the four divisions making up the Lillooet ethnographic group.

== British Columbia Treaty Process ==
Please see In-SHUCK-ch Nation#British Columbia Treaty Process.

== Demographics ==
Number of Band Members: 303.

== See also ==
- St'át'timc Chiefs Council
