= North Vancouver station =

Railway station in British Columbia, Canada

General information
- Location: 107 Carrie Cates Court, North Vancouver, BC; Canada
- Coordinates: 49.310434°N 123.082778°W

History
- Closed: 2002

Former services
Preceding station	BC Rail	Following station
Terminus	Main line	Ambleside toward Prince George
Terminus	Cariboo Prospector	Sunset Beach toward Lillooet or Prince George
Location
- Location within British Columbia Location within Canada

North Vancouver station was a railway station located in the city of North Vancouver, British Columbia, Canada. It was previously the terminus for BC Rail's Cariboo Prospector service.

== History ==
North Vancouver station was established for the Pacific Great Eastern Railway, later called BC Rail. It was constructed between 1913 and 1914 in Lower Lonsdale. Harold Cullerne designed the structure. It was built on 107 Carrie Cates Court. It was served by the Cariboo Prospector until it ceased operations on 31 October 2002. The station was used by the North Vancouver Museum of Archives and as a launching point for historical walking tours of the Lonsdale shipyards. In a report prepared for the council in 2013, Colliers International proposed that the station be repurposed as an ice cream or coffee shop as part of a proposed waterfront redevelopment project. In 2014, the station was temporarily moved to 449 Alder St. Polygon Gallery is located on the station's former location.
