= Devine, British Columbia =

Devine
- Location of Devine in British Columbia
- Coordinates: 50°31′00″N 122°29′00″W
- Country: Canada
- Province: British Columbia
- Time zone: UTC−07:00 (PT)
- Area code: 604

Devine is a rural locality located in the Gates Valley of the Lillooet Country in the southwestern Interior of British Columbia, Canada, about 3 km (2 mi) from D'Arcy, at the head of Anderson Lake.

== History ==
Devine gets its name from being the location of a lumber mill run by Andy Devine which employed Japanese-Canadians who had been Japanese Canadian internment relocated to McGillivray Falls (now McGillivray) which was just inside the 100-mile "quarantine zone" from the British Columbia Coast. Devine was able to hire the Japanese, who were experienced loggers and millworkers from the Coast, as the area was inaccessible from the Coast, other than by the rail line as no road to the Coast was open until the 1960s.

The post office at Devine opened in 1951 and closed in 1964. Remains of the old mill can still be found in the woods around Devine and until recently the old burner from Andy Devine's mill was the tallest manmade structure around.

== Modern era ==
Devine today is a recreational community with a few year-round residents. The nearest services are at D'Arcy, a few miles north and Birken, a few miles farther southwest along the road and rail line to Mount Currie and Pemberton.
