= D'Arcy, British Columbia =

Nequatque
- Location of Nequatque in British Columbia
- Coordinates: 50°33′00″N 122°29′00″W
- Country: Canada
- Province: British Columbia
- Time zone: UTC−07:00 (PT)

D'Arcy is an unincorporated community in the Canadian province of British Columbia, approximately 150 kilometres northeast of the city of Vancouver. Located at the head of Anderson Lake, D'Arcy, also known as Nequatque or N'Quatqua in the St'at'imcets (Lillooet) language, is partly a recreational and resource community and also the territory and residential area of the N'Quatqua First Nation.

== History ==
=== The Lakes Route ===
D'Arcy was founded as a non-native community named Port Anderson during the Fraser Canyon Gold Rush of 1858-1859, when it became one of the major ports of the Douglas Road, a.k.a. the "Lakes Route", which connected to the upper Fraser Canyon from the lower Fraser via a series of portages and lake transport. Steamers and other watercraft ran Anderson Lake from D'Arcy to the foot of the lake at Seton Portage (then known as Short Portage) a short 3 kilometre portage to Seton Lake, and from the foot of that lake another 5 kilometres to the trail's destination, the boomtown of Cayoosh Flat, which is today's town of Lillooet. The name D'Arcy was conferred on the settlement, which after the gold rush reverted to near-entirely First Nations population only, at the time of the construction of the Pacific Great Eastern Railway, when non-native settlers once again took up land in the area, including a general store and a set of cabins by the lakeshore. The name D'Arcy comes from D'Arcy Tate, vice president of the Pacific Great Eastern Railway, 1912-1918. The longtime proprietress of the store at D'Arcy, Irene Edwards, wrote a history of the entire region surrounding D'Arcy, as well as the town and its native people, in her self-published Short Portage to Lillooet.

=== Japanese relocatees and Devine ===
Nearby McGillivray Falls, a small resort a few miles down Anderson Lake via the railway, became one of the handful of relocation centres for Japanese expelled from the coast during the Second World War. D'Arcy at that time was just inside the 100-mile (160 km) "quarantine" zone from the Coast beyond which all Japanese had to be evacuated, but because the D'Arcy-Birken valley (known as the Gates Valley or Birken Valley) and the Pemberton Valley in those times had no road access to the Coast, its physical isolation made regulations placed on the Japanese somewhat lax in comparison to the internment camps in the Kootenays. Because of this situation, D'Arcy local Frank Devine was able to hire the relocated Japanese men, and brought them to work at a logging camp and mill two miles (3 km) up the Gates River from D'Arcy, which has ever since been known as Devine.

== Facilities ==
There is a public beach with a boat ramp. The N'Quatqua First Nation government offices also feature a gas station, store and post office boxes, community hall, school and other community services. The community was once irregularly served by the Kaoham Shuttle service from Seton Portage.

Former services
Preceding station	Canadian National Railway	Following station
Terminus	Kaoham Shuttle	Seton Portage toward Lillooet
Preceding station	BC Rail	Following station
Pre-2002
Devine toward North Vancouver	Main line	Marne toward Prince George
Devine toward North Vancouver	Cariboo Prospector	Ponderosa toward Lillooet or Prince George

== See also ==
- N'Quatqua
- N'Quatqua First Nation
