= Anderson Lake (British Columbia) =

Lake in British Columbia, Canada

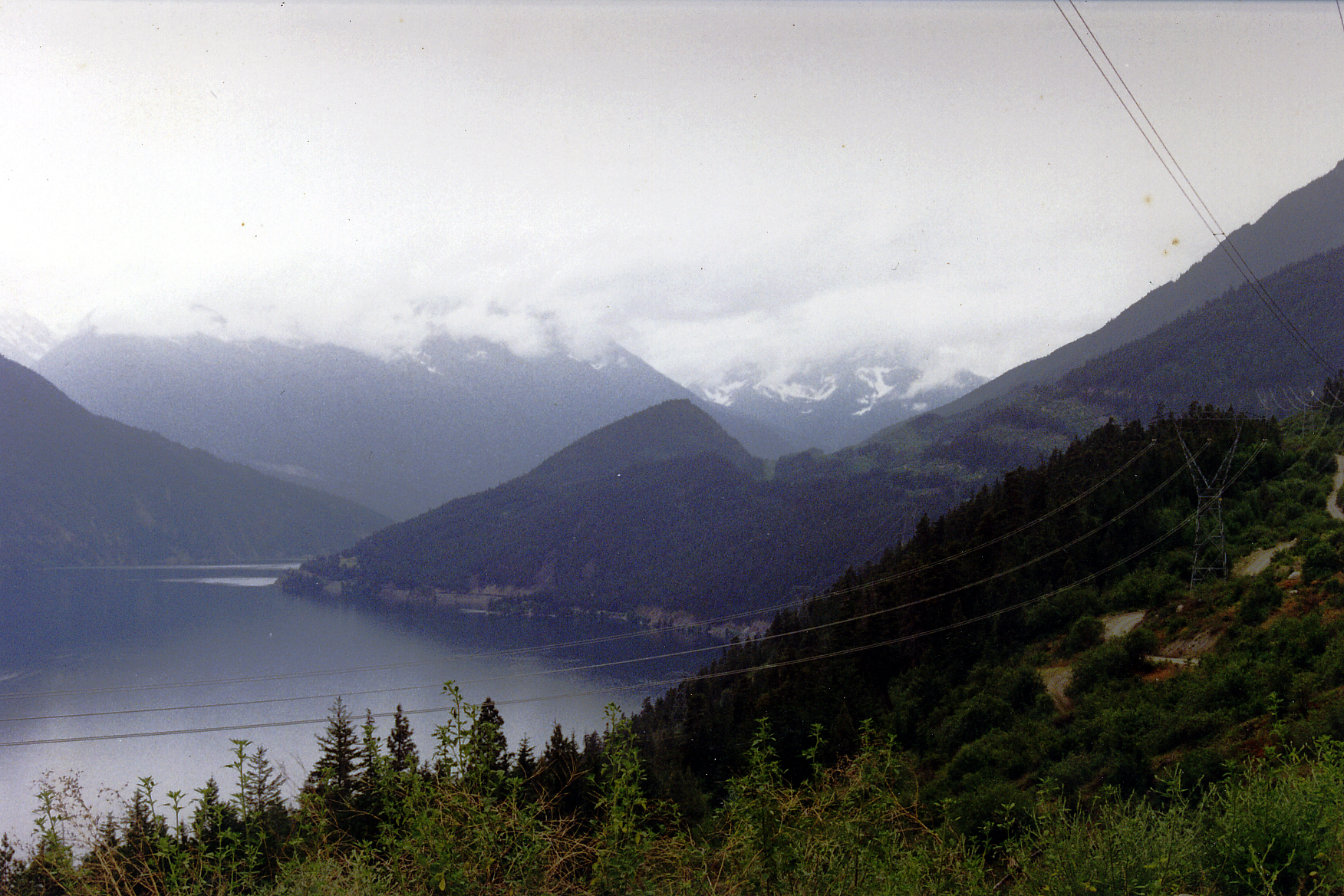
- Anderson Lake

- Location within British Columbia
- Location: Lillooet Country, British Columbia
- Coordinates: 50°37′59″N 122°24′35″W
- Primary inflows: Gates River
- Primary outflows: Seton River
- Basin countries: Canada
- Max. length: 21.3 km (13.2 mi)
- Max. width: 1.4 km (0.87 mi)
- Surface area: 28.6 km^{2} (11.0 sq mi)
- Average depth: 140 m (460 ft)
- Max. depth: 215 m (705 ft)
- Water volume: 4.004 km^{3} (0.961 cu mi)
- Surface elevation: 260 m (850 ft)

Anderson Lake is a deep lake in the Squamish-Lillooet region of southwestern British Columbia. On the northwest side are the Bendor Range and Cadwallader Range. On the southeast is the Cayoosh Range. By road, the southern end is about 47 km (29 mi) northeast of Pemberton.

== Name origin ==
In 1827, Francis Ermatinger of the Hudson's Bay Company (HBC), the first European explorer, referred to the Seton and Anderson lakes as the first and second Peseline Lake (various spellings). In 1846, Alexander Caulfield Anderson ventured along the lakes when seeking a new HBC fur brigade route from Fort Alexandria. In 1858, Governor James Douglas commissioned Anderson to establish a route to the goldfields during the Fraser Canyon Gold Rush. Encouraged by the governor, he named the first lake after himself.

== Dimensions and tributaries ==
The lake is 21.3 kilometres (13.2 mi) long and averages 1.4 kilometres (0.9 mi) wide. The surface area is 28.6 square kilometres (11.0 sq mi). The mean depth is 140 metres (460 ft) and maximum depth is 215 metres (705 ft). The size and depth help trap glacial silt entering from tributaries which would cloud the water. The lake has not completely frozen in recent centuries but has in the past. The water is a few degrees warmer than Seton Lake.

At the north end, the outflow is the Seton River. Anticlockwise, the main tributaries are Sundquist Creek, Six Mile Creek, Connel Creek, Xusum Creek, McGillivray Creek, Mellott Creek, Scutt Creek, D'Arcy Creek, Gates River, Pinney Creek, McDonnell Creek, Wade Creek, and Lost Valley Creek. The rapid Gates River at the south end (formerly called Anderson Creek) is the primary inflow.

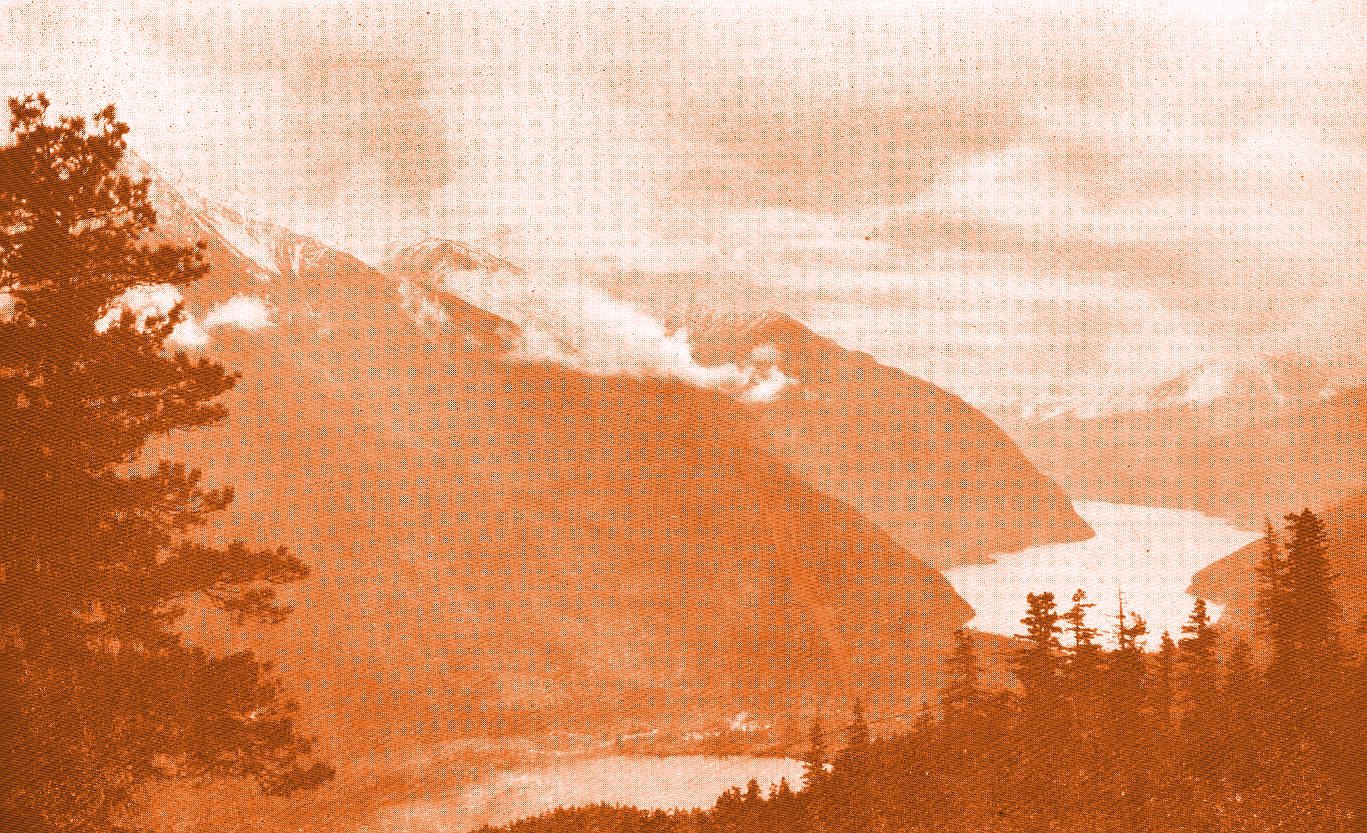
View from the Bridge River trail of Seton Lake and the higher Anderson Lake

== Geology and topography ==
The region comprises a mix of volcanic and sedimentary rocks. At the end of the Last Glacial Period (LGP), Seton and Anderson were a single continuous lake, with a level about 100 metres (330 ft) higher than present. At the Seton Portage area, erosion and landslides of weak rocks susceptible to rapid weathering tumbled into the lake, and tributaries deposited sediment. Over tens of thousands of years, the accumulation created separate lakes, and a river formed from Anderson to Seton, which by 1910 was about 18 metres (60 ft) lower (currently 15 metres (50 ft)). Minimal agricultural land exists along the mountainous shores of the lake beyond a limited area at the portage. Here, a noticeable gap in the mountains indicates a large landslide on the east side.

== Climate ==
During 1964–2016, the mean annual winter temperature was −1 °C (30 °F) and summer was 21 °C (70 °F). The area falls within the rain-shadow of the Coast Mountains, experiencing a semi-arid low mean annual precipitation of 300 to 400 millimetres (12 to 16 in) and forest primarily of Ponderosa Pine. Over the 210-metre (700 ft) descent of the Gates River, the climate changes. Emerging from the valley, the south end of the lake marks the boundary of the Dry Belt.

== Ferries ==
=== 1858–c.1864 ===
Although a trail existed along the north shore, this section of the Douglas Road was mostly travelled via the lake, initially by canoe. Built on the lake for Chapman & Co, the 22-metre (72 ft) paddle steamer Lady of the Lake was launched in early summer 1860. Assumedly, this was the vessel that qualified for the $150 government grant. However, competition for freight and passengers from small sail boats allegedly made the steamer operation unprofitable. Before year end, the steamer schedule connected with the Seton Lake one. In 1862, the Port Anderson–Short Portage steamer fare was $1.

=== Intermediate years ===
First Nations provided an informal canoe service.

=== 1911–1915 ===
In 1911, the Bluebird was built to move workers and supplies during the railway construction, but was destroyed in a violent storm. In late June 1912, the 9.1-metre (30 ft) gasoline-powered Dolly Varden made its first trip up the lake. The service connected with the regular Seton Lake boat and the stage from Pemberton. That year, the railway construction contractor was building a tug and scow for launching in the new year.

The public ferry was subsidised 1912–1915. Refloated after sinking in October 1915, the 50-passenger motorboat was moved to Seton Lake in summer 1916 to operate as a pleasure craft.

== Railway ==
In November 1912, the railway contractor erected a headquarters at the southwestern end of the lake.

The northward advance of the Pacific Great Eastern Railway (PGE) rail head reached this point in early December 1914, and a mixed train service began mid-month. The rail head reached the western end of Seton Lake late in the following month.

The stations along the west side of the lake have been as follows:

Train Timetables (Regular stop or Flag stop)
	Mile	1923	1936	1943	1950	1959	1969	1978	1986	1996	2002
Seton Portage	139.3							Flag	Flag	Flag	Flag
Seton	138.0		Regular	Regular	Regular	Flag	Flag				
Curries	133.9							Flag	Flag	Flag	Flag
Marne ^{a}	130.4	Flag	Flag	Flag	Flag	Flag	Flag	Flag	Flag	Flag	Flag
McGillivray	128.9		Regular	Regular	Regular						
McGillivray Falls	128.9						Flag	Flag	Flag	Flag	Flag
Ponderosa	127.8						Flag	Flag	Flag	Flag	Flag
D'Arcy ^{b}	122.8	Flag	Regular	Regular	Regular	Flag	Flag	Flag	Flag	Flag	Flag

^a. The station existed by 1916
^b. The station existed by 1915.

In August 1944, a northbound passenger train struck a landslide. The engineer and fireman drowned when the locomotive and tender plunged into the lake. A car derailed, but crew and passengers escaped injury. The locomotive was never recovered.

In November 1954, six cars of a freight train derailed.

In December 2000, when 17 cars of a southbound freight train derailed, three plunged to the bottom of the lake.

Canadian National Railways have operated the BC Rail line since 2004.

Although riding the Kaoham Shuttle beyond the regular Seton Lake route to include the Anderson west shore has been advertised as available by advance appointment in the past, whether the arrangement of such an excursion is still possible is unclear.

== Recreation and roads ==
Boating, fishing, water skiing, windsurfing, canoeing, mountain biking, off roading, and snowmobiling are popular. Boat launches exist at the two ends. At D’Arcy, the southern tip, a campground operates and the paving ends. A 33-kilometre (21 mi) seasonal gravel road over high rocky bluffs, known as the High Line Road, traverses the western side of the lake.

== Maps ==
- "BC map". www.davidrumsey.com. 1925.
- "Shell BC map". www.davidrumsey.com. 1956.

== See also ==
- List of lakes of British Columbia
- Vessels of the Lakes Route
