= List of tributaries of the Fraser River =

This is a partial listing of tributaries of the Fraser River. Tributaries and sub-tributaries are hierarchically listed in upstream order from the mouth of the Fraser River. The list may also include streams known as creeks and sloughs. Lakes are noted in italics.

All of these streams are in British Columbia, Canada, except the upper Vedder River (Chilliwack River) and some of its tributaries, which are in Washington, United States.

== Mouth to Harrison River ==
- Brunette River
  - Burnaby Lake
    - Still Creek
- Coquitlam River
  - Coquitlam Lake
- Pitt River
  - Alouette River
    - Alouette Lake
      - Gold Creek
  - Widgeon Creek
  - Pitt Lake
    - Pitt River
- Kanaka Creek
  - McNutt Creek
- Whonnock Creek
- Stave River
  - Silvermere Lake
  - Hayward Lake
  - Hairsine Creek
    - Steelhead Creek
      - Stave River
        - Stave Lake
          - Cascade Creek
          - Terepocki Creek
          - Tingle Creek
          - Stave River
            - Piluk Creek
- Silver Creek
- D'Herbomez Creek
- Hatzic Slough
  - Hatzic Lake
    - Durieu Creek
- Norrish Creek

== Harrison River system ==
- Harrison River
  - Chehalis River
    - Chehalis Lake
  - Harrison Lake
    - Silver River
    - Tretheway Creek
    - Tipella Creek
    - Lillooet River
      - Sloquet Creek
      - Fire Creek
      - Snowcap Creek
      - Lillooet Lake
        - Joffre Creek
        - Birkenhead River
          - Birkenhead Lake
            - Taillefer Creek
        - Green River
          - Rutherford Creek
          - Soo River
          - Green Lake
              - Rainbow Creek
            - River of Golden Dreams (Alta Creek)
              - Alta Lake
                - Brio Creek
            - Fitzsimmons Creek
        - Ryan River
        - Meager Creek
        - Salal Creek

== Harrison to Thompson River ==
- Sumas River
  - Vedder River (also called Chilliwack River)
    - Sweltzer River
    - Slesse Creek
    - Depot Creek
    - Little Chilliwack River
- Ruby Creek
- Coquihalla River
  - Nicolum River
- Anderson River
- Nahatlatch River
- Ainslie Creek (formerly Nine Mile Creek)

== Thompson River system ==
- Thompson River
  - Botanie Creek
  - Nicoamen River
  - Skoonka Creek
  - Murray Creek
  - Nicola River
    - Spius Creek
    - Coldwater River
    - Nicola Lake
      - Quilchena Creek
  - Oregon Jack Creek
  - Bonaparte River
    - Cache Creek
    - Hat Creek
    - Rayfield River
  - Deadman River
  - Kamloops Lake
    - Tranquille River
  - South Thompson River
    - Monte Creek
    - Chase Creek
    - Little Shuswap Lake
      - Little River
        - Shuswap Lake
          - Adams River
          - Seymour River
          - Anstey River
          - Eagle River
            - Perry River
          - Sicamous Narrows
            - Mara Lake
              - Shuswap River
                - Mabel Lake
                  - Wap Creek
                - Shuswap River
                  - Bessette Creek
                    - Duteau Creek
                      - Haddo Lake
                        - Duteau Creek
                          - Grizzly Lake
                        - Heart Creek
                          - Aberdeen Lake
                    - Creighton Creek
                    - Harris Creek
                  - Sugar Lake
                    - Shuswap River
                      - Tsuius Creek
                      - Joss Creek
          - Salmon River
  - North Thompson River
    - Barrière River
    - Clearwater River
      - Mahood River
        - Mahood Lake
          - Canim River
            - Canim Lake
              - Bridge Creek
      - Murtle River
      - Clearwater Lake
      - Azure River
        - Azure Lake
          - Angus Horne Lake
    - Raft River
    - Mad River
    - Blue River
    - Mud Creek
    - Thunder River
    - Moonbeam Creek
    - Albreda River
    - Lempriere Creek

== Thompson to Chilcotin River ==
- Stein River
- Seton River (Seton Creek)
  - Cayoosh Creek
    - Duffey Lake
  - Seton Lake
    - Seton River (Seton Portage River)
    - Anderson Lake
      - McGillivray Creek
      - Haylmore Creek
      - Gates River
- Bridge River
  - Yalakom River
  - Carpenter Lake
    - Marshall Creek
      - Marshall Lake
    - Tyaughton Creek
        - Liza Creek
          - Liza Lake
      - Tyaughton Lake
        - Tyaughton Creek
          - Relay Creek
          - Noaxe Creek
    - Gun Creek
      - Lajoie Creek
        - Gun Lake
          - Lajoie Creek
            - Lajoie Lake
      - Leckie Creek
      - Slim Creek
  - Bridge River
    - Hurley River
      - Cadwallader Creek
    - Downton Lake
      - Bridge River
        - Nichols Creek
- Churn Creek

== Chilcotin River system ==
- Chilcotin River
  - Chilko River
    - Taseko River
      - Taseko Lake
        - Lord River
        - Tchaikazan River
    - Chilko Lake
      - Edmond River
    - Chilanko River

== Chilcotin to Quesnel River ==
- Williams Lake River
  - Williams Lake
    - San Jose River
- West Road River (also called Blackwater River)
  - Euchiniko River
  - Nazko River
    - Snaking River
    - Clisbako River
  - Baezaeko River
    - Coglistiko River
  - Kushya River

== Quesnel River system ==
- Quesnel River
  - Cariboo River
    - Cariboo Lake
      - Cariboo River
        - Little River
        - Matthew River
        - Lanezi Lake
          - Cariboo River
            - Isaac River
              - Isaac Lake
                - Wolverine River
  - Quesnel Lake
    - Roaring River
    - Mitchell River
      - Mitchel Lake
    - Niagara Creek
    - Horsefly River
      - Horsefly Lake

== Quesnel to Nechako River ==
- Cottonwood River
  - Swift River
    - John Boyd Creek
      - Mary Creek

== Nechako River system ==
- Nechako River
  - Stuart River
    - Stuart Lake
      - Necoslie River
      - Pinchi Creek
        - Pinchi Lake
          - Tsilcoh River
          - Ocock River
      - Tachie River
        - Kuzkwa River
          - Tezzeron Lake
        - Trembleur Lake
          - Middle River
            - Takla Lake
              - Sakeniche River
                - Natowite Lake
              - Driftwood River
                - Kotsine River
  - Endako River
    - Tchesinkut River
      - Tchesinkut Lake
    - Burns Lake
  - Nautley River
    - Fraser Lake
      - Stellako River
        - François Lake
          - Nadina River
  - Cheslatta River
    - Murray Lake
      - Bird Creek
    - Cheslatta Lake
        - Knapp Creek
      - Cheslatta River
        - Dog Creek
        - Moxley Creek
        - Skins Lake Spillway
  - Nechako Canyon
  - Nechako Reservoir (Kenney Dam)
    - Knewstubb Lake (part of Nechako Reservoir)
      - Natalkuz Lake (Nechako Reservoir)
        - Euchu Reach (Nechako Reservoir)
          - Entiako River
          - Chelaslie Arm (Nechako Reservoir)
            - Chelaslie River
              - Blanchet River
              - Chief Louis Lake
                - Chelaslie River
          - Tetachuck River
            - Tetachuck Lake (Nechako Reservoir)
              - Tetachuck River
                - Eutsuk Lake
                  - Chezko River
                  - Pondosy Lake
        - Intata Reach (Nechako Reservoir)
          - Ootsa Lake (Nechako Reservoir)
            - Tahtsa Reach (Nechako Reservoir)
              - Kasalka Creek
                - Troitsa Lake
              - Tahtsa Lake (Nechako Reservoir)
            - Whitesail Reach (Nechako Reservoir)
              - Whitesail Lake (Nechako Reservoir)
                - Little Whitesail Lake (Nechako Reservoir)

== Nechako River to source ==
- Salmon River
- Willow River
- McGregor River
  - Seebach Creek
  - Herrick Creek
    - Bad River (James Creek)
  - Wishaw Lake
- Bowron River
- Torpy River
- Morkill River
- Goat River
  - Milk River
- East Twin Creek
- West Twin Creek
- McKale River
- Doré River
- Castle Creek
- Holmes River
- Raush River
- Kiwa Creek
- Tete Creek
- McLennan River
- Swiftcurrent Creek
- Robson River
- Moose Lake
- Moose River

== See also ==
- List of rivers of British Columbia
- List of rivers of Washington (state)
- List of rivers of the Americas
