= Seton Canal =

Coordinates: 50°40′07″N 121°57′09″W

The Seton Canal is a diversion of the flow of the Seton River from Seton Dam, just below the flow of Seton Lake, to the Seton Powerhouse on the Fraser River at the town of Lillooet, British Columbia, Canada. The canal bridges Cayoosh Creek 300m below its commencement and is about 3.5 km in length, ending just under a bridge used by the Texas Creek Road (aka the West Side Road), where the canal's waterflow is fed into tunnels which feed the Seton Powerhouse on the further side of a small rocky hill. Most of the water carried by the canal is the volume of the diverted Bridge River, which is fed into Seton Lake via BC Hydro's Bridge River generating stations at Shalalth, 16 km to the west, that are supplied by diversion tunnels through Mission Ridge from Carpenter Lake, the reservoir created by Terzaghi Dam.
