= Tyaughton Lake =

Lake in British Columbia, Canada

- Location within British Columbia Location within Canada
- Location: Bridge River Country, West-Central Interior of British Columbia
- Coordinates: 50°57′N 122°46′W
- Basin countries: Canada
- Surface elevation: 1,010 m (3,310 ft)
- Settlements: Tyax Mountain Lake Resort

Tyaughton Lake, also known as Tyax Lake, is a lake in the Bridge River Country of the West-Central Interior of British Columbia, Canada, located to the north of Carpenter Lake, a reservoir along the Bridge River formed by Terzaghi Dam of the Bridge River Power Project. Among the largest of a number of well-known fishing lakes located in valleys flanking the Bridge River, its name is an adaptation of a Chilcotin word meaning "jumping fish". Around its shores is a community of recreational homes, and near its southern end had been an older fishing lodge, the Tyaughton Lake Lodge, while on its northwestern shore is Tyax Lodge (formerly known as Tyax Mountain Lake Resort, as well as Tyax Wilderness Resort & Spa), built in the 1980s, which at the time of construction was the largest log structure built in British Columbia in the 20th Century. Despite the shared name, it is not directly on the course of Tyaughton Creek, but is linked to the lower canyon of that creek by a short intermediary stream. The main road access is from the Gun Creek Forest Service Road from a junction on BC Highway 40 (the Gold Bridge-Lillooet Road midway between the outlets into Carpenter Lake of Tyaughton Creek (E) and Gun Creek (W).

== See also ==
- List of lakes of British Columbia
