= Seton Dam =

Coordinates: 50°40′08″N 121°59′19″W

Seton Dam is a dam on the Seton River, 350m below the outlet of Seton Lake 5 km west of the town of Lillooet, British Columbia, Canada, and with the related Seton Canal is part of the lowest and last stage of BC Hydro's Bridge River Power Project. The 18-meter-high (59 ft) concrete dam, completed in 1956, raised the height of Seton Lake only 10 feet in order to maximize the elevation differential between that lake and the Fraser River in order to extract the maximal potential output of power generation at the Seton Powerhouse, which is located on the Fraser just south of the confluence of the Seton River proper.
