= Mission Pass =

Mountain pass in British Columbia, Canada

- Location within British Columbia

Third Approach
- Location: British Columbia, Canada
- Coordinates: 50°45′00″N 122°14′00″W
- Topo map: NTS 92J16 Bridge River

Mission Pass is a historic mountain pass in the Bridge River-Lillooet Country of the Interior of British Columbia, Canada, around 20 km (12 mi) west of Lillooet, towards the west end of Seton Lake. The summit is 1,187 metres (3,894 ft) above sea level.
