= Seton Powerhouse =

Hydroelectric power station in British Columbia, Canada

Coordinates: 50°40′22″N 121°55′27″W

The Seton Powerhouse is a hydroelectric generating station on the Fraser River just below the confluence of the Seton River at the town of Lillooet, British Columbia, Canada. The powerhouse is fed by the Seton Canal, a 5 km diversion of the flow of the Seton River which begins at Seton Dam, just below the foot of Seton Lake to the west. The powerhouse is the last in sequence, and smallest, of the generating stations of BC Hydro's Bridge River Power Project, which diverts the flow of the Bridge River into Seton Lake. The powerhouse uses only 50 feet of head between Seton Lake and the Fraser to produce a maximum generating capacity of 42 MW and an average capacity of 330 GWh per year.
