= Lajoie Dam =

Dam in British Columbia, Canada

- Location within British Columbia
- Country: Canada
- Location: Near Gold Bridge, BC
- Coordinates: 50.835°N 122.859°W
- Purpose: Hydroelectricity, Storage
- Status: Active
- Opening date: 1948 (raised 1955)
- Owner: BC Hydro

Dam and spillways
- Type of dam: Earth-fill
- Impounds: Bridge River
- Height (foundation): 87 m

Reservoir
- Creates: Downton Lake
- Total capacity: 700,000,000 m³

Lajoie Powerhouse
- Installed capacity: 22 MW
- Annual generation: 170 GWh

Lajoie Dam is the uppermost of the storage dams of BC Hydro's Bridge River Power Project, which is located in the southwestern Interior of British Columbia. It is located just west of the small semi-ghost town of Gold Bridge. An earthfill structure, it is 87 m (287 ft) and impounds c. 570,000 acre-feet (700,000,000 m^{3}) of water in Downton Lake Reservoir. The Lajoie Powerhouse generates 22 MW with an average generating capacity of 170 GWh/year. A few miles downstream is Carpenter Lake, which is formed by Terzaghi Dam, the largest of the Bridge River Power Project's structures. Downton Reservoir is named for Geoffrey M. Downton, a pioneer surveyor who was the first to recognize the hydroelectric potential in the drop in elevation between the Bridge and Seton river systems. Lajoie Dam and Powerhouse are atop the site of Lajoie Falls, which was named after Lazack Lajoie, a local "mountain man" and entrepreneur-huckster who promoted a townsite and mining complex around Gun Lake which never came to fruition.

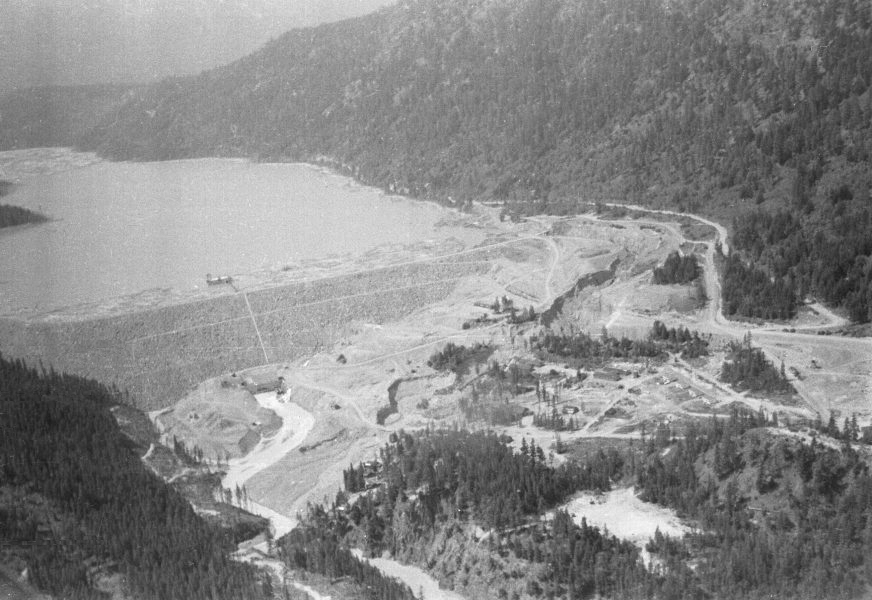
Lajoie Dam Under Construction, 1950s. E. Cleven Photo, aerial

The LaJoie Dam on Downton Lake, today
