= Marys Creek =

Marys Creek may refer to:

- Marys Creek, Queensland, a rural locality in the Gympie Region, Queensland, Australia
- Marys Creek (Haw River tributary), a 3rd order tributary to the Haw River, in Alamance County, North Carolina, United States
- Mary Creek, a creek in the Cariboo region of British Columbia, Canada
