= Mission Ridge (British Columbia) =

Ridge in British Columbia, Canada

Coordinates: 50°44′26″N 122°05′58″W

Mission Ridge, also known as Mission Mountain, is a ridge in the Bridge River-Lillooet Country of the South-Central Interior of British Columbia, Canada, extending westward from the town of Lillooet along the north side of Seton Lake to Mission Pass, which is immediately above and to the north of the lakeside community of Shalalth. The road over the pass is also known as Mission Mountain, which is short for "Mission Mountain Road". Mission Creek lies on the north side of the pass, and is a tributary of the Bridge River, the lower reaches of which lie on the north side of the ridge, and which was the only road access into the upper Bridge River Country before the construction of a road through the Bridge River Canyon in the mid-1950s opened that region up to road access from the lower Bridge River valley and the town of Lillooet via the community of Moha. Most, or virtually all, of the ridge, is Indian Reserves, notably Slosh 1, under the administration of the Seton Lake Indian Band, and Bridge River 1, which is under the administration of the Bridge River Indian Band. Parts of the ridge's eastern end are in reserves controlled by the Lillooet Indian Band, including its final spires above Lillooet, which were dubbed St. Mary's Mount by the Reverend Lundin Brown in the 1860s, though that name never stuck and is ungazetted.

== Name origin ==
The name derives from the former Oblate Mission at Shalalth. Originally the ridge, which is about 20 km in length, was referred to as Mission Mountain but as another Mission Mountain was already recorded in British Columbia (on the Tsimpsean Peninsula near Prince Rupert) and the term refers really more to a small mountain range than to any one specific summit, the term Mission Ridge was coined in 1931 for official purposes. The British Columbia Geographic Names Information System places the coordinates of the ridge on Mission Peak, which is the westerly of the ridge's three main summits and is labelled on the provincial basemap as such. The other two summits are conjointly referred to as Mount McLean, with the actually-highest of the pair being officially unnamed because it is invisible from the lake and other viewpoints for the ridge (the highest summit is only visible from the Fountain-Pavilion stretch of BC Highway 99), and from Moha. Mount McLean is named for Donald McLean of the Hudson's Bay Company and a casualty of the Chilcotin War.

== Features and access ==
At the western end of the ridge, on a knoll immediately above Shalalth and just east of the summit of the pass, a microwave station is located, with road access from the pass. A powerline road continues along the ridge, running along its north side from Mission Peak eastwards, but is blocked to through traffic by a landslide in that area. A network of roads extending up from a bridge-crossing of the lower Bridge River between Applespring Creek and Moha ranges up the basin of Camoo Creek, which forms the main north-facing basin of the ridge, which includes lower benchlands near Moha, and connects to a steep descent of the powerline through the basin of Ama Creek to the confluence of the Bridge River with the Fraser at the Bridge River Rapids (the summit viewable from that point is the lower of the two Mount McLeans). There are numerous small ponds on the ridge, including Moon Lake which is in one of the high alpine basins of the ridge, which is mostly meadow or tundra, although its south face above Seton Lake is extremely steep and includes extremely high bluffs and debris chutes towering over the eastern end of the lake. The ridge's northwestern side forms the southeast rim of the Bridge River Canyon, which extends from the area of Terzaghi Dam (originally known as Mission Dam) to Moha. The ridge's very far eastern end forms the north wall of the short canyon connecting the foot of Seton Lake and merging with the canyon of Cayoosh Creek known historically as Nkoomptch, or the Nkoomptch ("water crossing over"). An extension of the ridge west of the pass ends at Nosebag Mountain. To the west of Nosebag and Whitecap Creek, which runs south of it to join the Seton River in Seton Portage, is the Bendor Range.

== Classification ==
In some references the ridge is referred to as being part of the "Chilcotin Mountains", but these end at the Bridge River, despite a common geological alignment with the Shulaps Range, which is the most easterly of the Chilcotin Ranges. The ridge is properly part of the Pacific Ranges.

== See also ==
- Mission Mountains (Montana)
- Fountain Ridge
- Cayoosh Range
