= Mount McLean =

Mountain summit in British Columbia, Canada

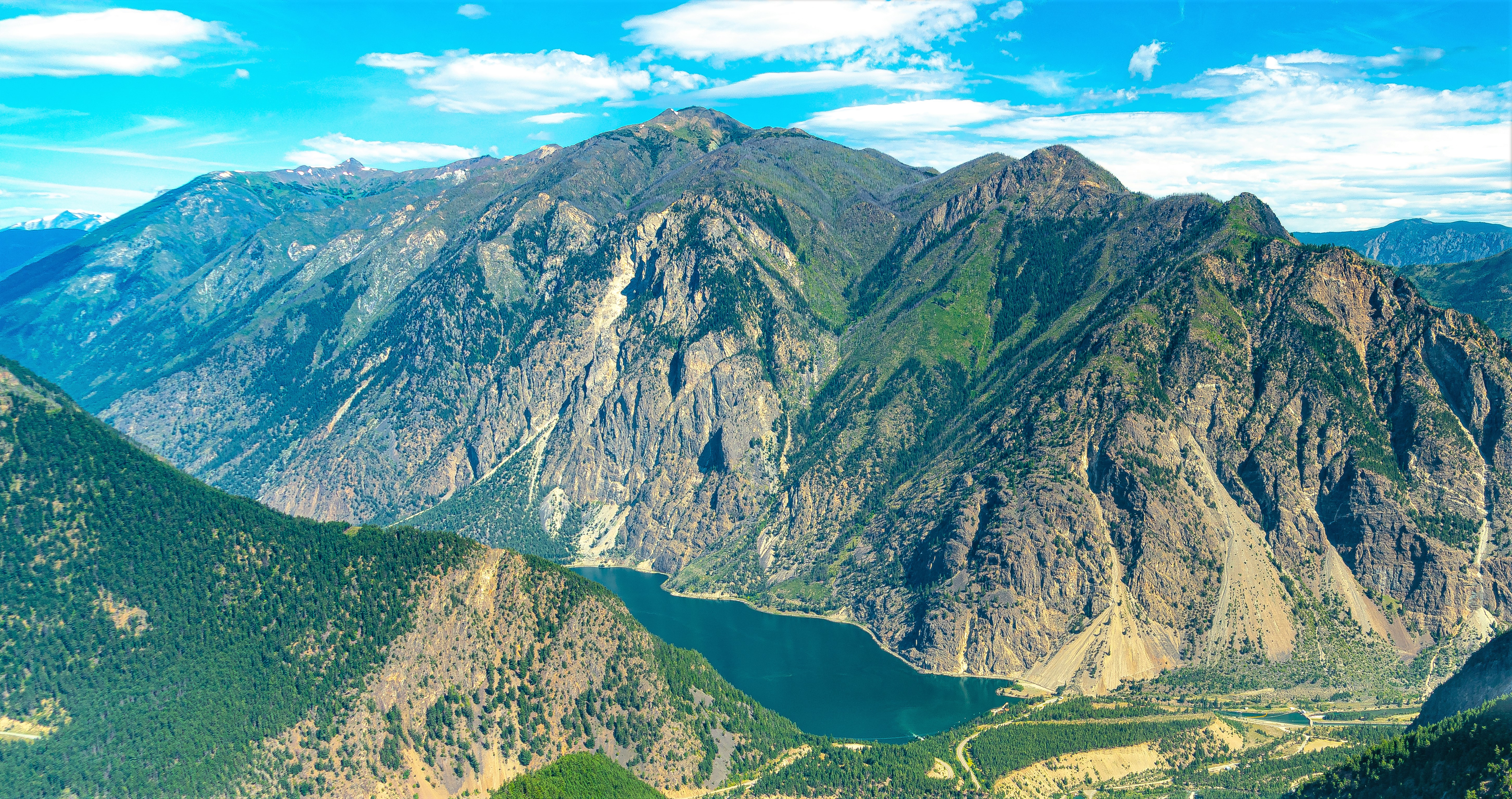
- South aspect, aerial view

Highest point
- Elevation: 2,427 m (7,963 ft)
- Prominence: 1,254 m (4,114 ft)
- Parent peak: Mount Queen Bess (3,298 m)
- Isolation: 15.3 km (9.5 mi)
- Listing: Mountains of British Columbia
- Coordinates: 50°43′52″N 122°03′52″W

Naming
- Etymology: Donald McLean

Geography
- Location within British Columbia Location within Canada
- Interactive map of Mount McLean
- Country: Canada
- Province: British Columbia
- District: Lillooet Land District
- Parent range: Mission Ridge; Coast Mountains
- Topo map: NTS 92J9 Shalalth

Mount McLean is a 2,427-metre (7,963-foot) mountain summit located in British Columbia, Canada.

== Description ==
Mount McLean is the highest peak of Mission Ridge, which is a subrange of the Coast Mountains. The prominent mountain is situated 8 km (5 mi) west of Lillooet and immediately north of Seton Lake. Precipitation runoff from the peak drains to Seton Lake and tributaries of the Fraser River. Mount McLean is more notable for its steep rise above local terrain than for its absolute elevation as topographic relief is significant with the summit rising 2,184 meters (7,165 ft) above Seton Lake in 4 km (2.5 mi). There are radio repeater towers on the summit.

== Etymology ==
The mountain was named "McLean Mountain" in publications dating back to at least 1895. The toponym was officially adopted as Mount McLean on January 17, 1957, by the Geographical Names Board of Canada. The mountain is named after Donald McLean (1805–1864), a Scottish fur trader and explorer for the Hudson's Bay Company who later became a cattle rancher near Cache Creek.

== Climate ==
Based on the Köppen climate classification, Mount McLean is located in a subarctic climate zone of western North America. Most weather fronts originate in the Pacific Ocean, and travel east toward the Coast Mountains where they are forced upward by the range (Orographic lift), causing them to drop their moisture in the form of rain or snowfall. As a result, the Coast Mountains experience high precipitation, especially during the winter months in the form of snowfall. Winter temperatures can drop below −20 °C with wind chill factors below −30 °C.

== Gallery ==
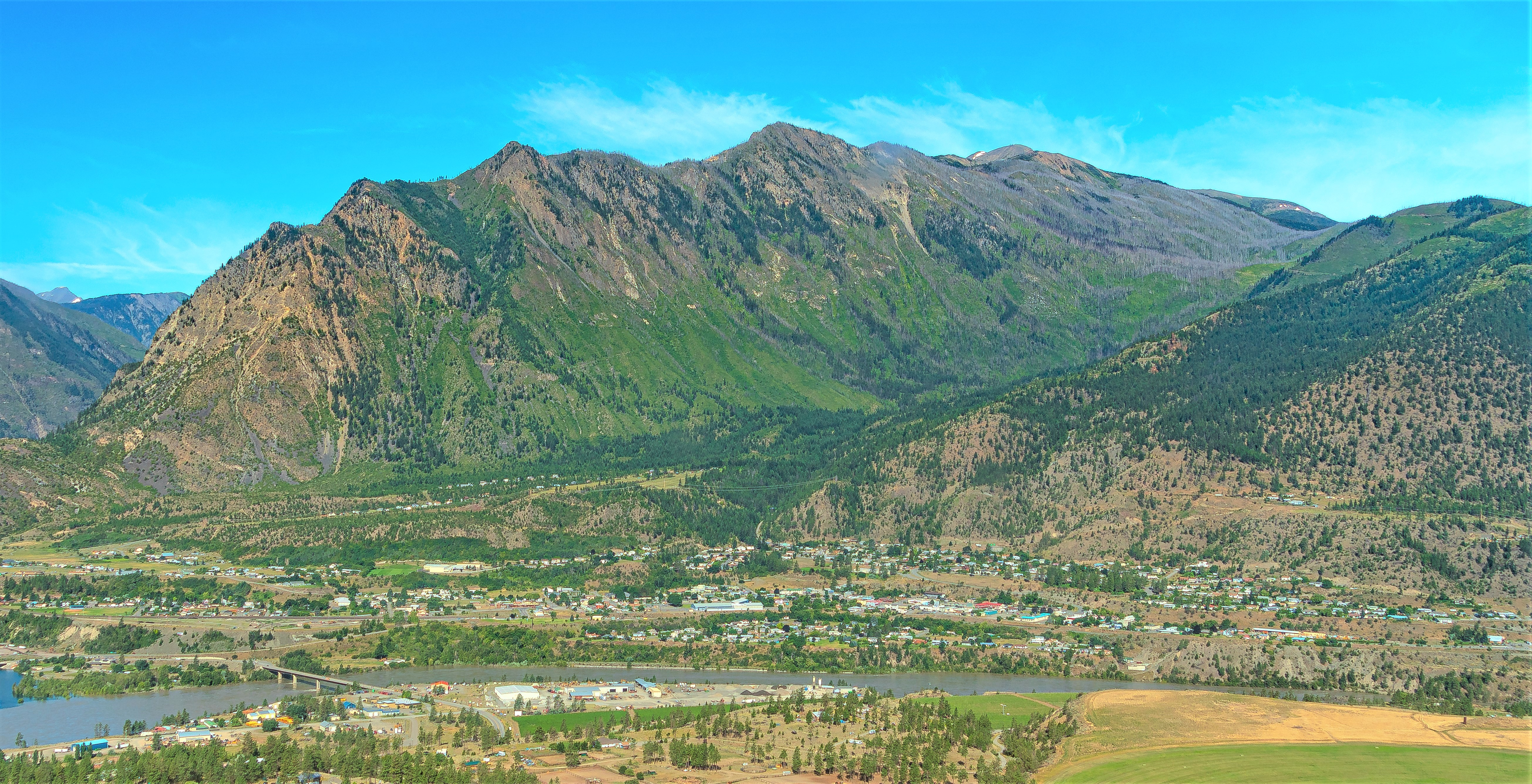
East aspect of Mount McLean rises behind Lillooet

== See also ==
- Geography of British Columbia
