= Cayoosh Creek =

River in Canada

Cayoosh Creek Cayoose Creek
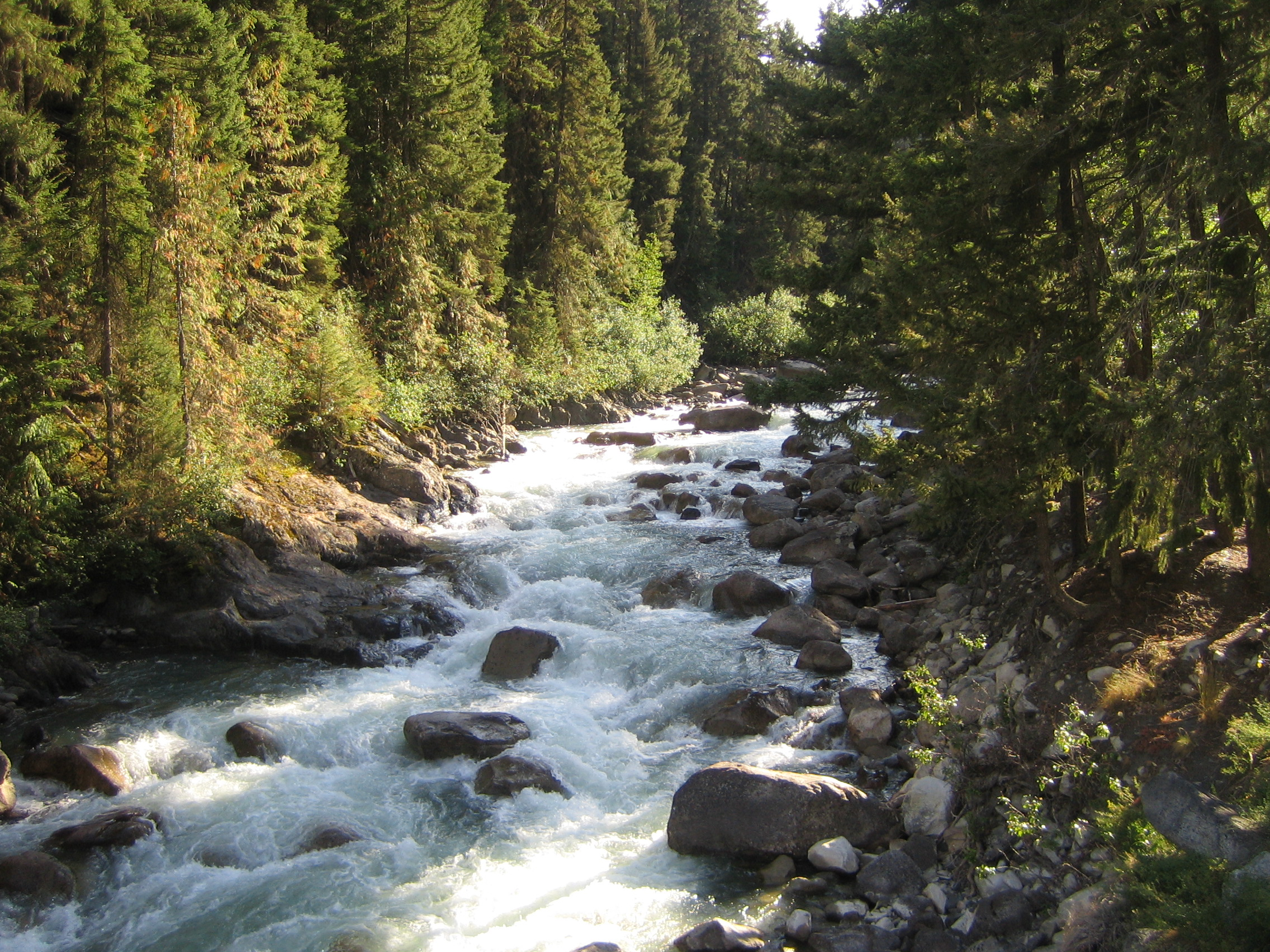
- Cayoosh Creek
- Etymology: wild ponylocal variant of "cayoose", which ultimately is from Spanish caballo, referring to a certain mountain breed of horse

Location
- Country: Canada
- Province: British Columbia
- District: Lillooet Land District

Physical characteristics
- Source: Cayoosh Range
  - location: Coast Mountains
- Mouth: Seton River
  - location: Lillooet
  - coordinates: 50°40′7″N 121°58′21″W
  - elevation: 229 m (751 ft)
- Basin size: 885 km^{2} (342 sq mi)
- Discharge
  - location: mouth
  - average: 13.9 m^{3}/s (490 cu ft/s)
  - minimum: 0.377 m^{3}/s (13.3 cu ft/s)
  - maximum: 211 m^{3}/s (7,500 cu ft/s)

Cayoosh Creek is a northeast-flowing tributary of the Seton River in the Canadian province of British Columbia. The name Cayoosh Creek remains on the bridge-sign crossing the stream on BC Highway 99 and continues in use locally to refer to the final reaches of the Seton River, formerly Seton Creek, which prior to the renaming ending at the confluence with Cayoosh Creek. The creek is the namesake of Cayoosh Creek Indian Reserve No. 1, one of the main Indian reserves of the Cayoose Creek Indian Band (a.k.a. the Sekwelwas First Nation), which lies adjacent to what was renamed the Seton River without local consultation.

== Course ==
Cayoosh Creek flows generally northeast from sources in the eponymous Cayoosh Range north of Cayoosh Pass to join the Seton River at Lillooet, British Columbia. In local parlance, the 4 kilometre length of the Seton River to its confluence with the Fraser River at the town of Lillooet is referred to as Cayoosh Creek, as is indicated by a Department of Highways sign on the BC Highway 99 bridge crossing it just before the Bridge of the Twenty-Three Camels over the Fraser, which lies immediately upstream of the river's mouth.

=== Cayoosh Canyon ===
Although already 10 km long when it enters Duffey Lake, a 20-kilometre (12 mi) long lake which is the focus of its upper basin, at the lake's outflow it begins a rapid descent, carving deeply between the Cayoosh Range and the main Lillooet Ranges to the south. Duffey Lake is named for "Sapper Duffy", a Lieut. Patrick Duffey (or "Duffy") or the Royal Engineers, who was assigned to investigate the route of the Cayoosh valley as a possible wagon road from the head of Lillooet Lake to Lillooet, which because of the steep descent westwards from Cayoosh Pass was not gone forward with. The creek's final descent to the confluence with the Seton is a deeper and deeper canyon, narrow and twisting, with the last ridges of the Cayoosh Range forming a rock wall thousands of feet in height, immediately opposite the highway across a very narrow gorge below. The north wall of the canyon was the location of the Golden Cache Mine, which started a small regional rush in 1897-1901 and whose former mill buildings were in the depths of the canyon below the highway and whose workings were reached by ramparts beneath overhangs on the highest part of the canyon wall. Opposite it was the Ample Mine, also a gold mine in the same period. This stretch of the canyon was the site of the hunt for First World War hero-turned-outlaw Frank Gott, who is commemorated by Gott Peak which is on the southern rim of the Cayoosh basin, on the divide separating it from the basin of the Stein River, which parallels it roughly to the south, and which is one of Cayoosh Creek's several large southern tributaries.

At the bottom of the canyon, as the highway clings to a mountain face some three thousand feet high, ranging from one to two thousand feet to the creek, steep below, there is a small private reservoir formed by a dam where Cayoosh Falls had once been known as Walden North. Walden North was a private estate and scientific research facility and manufacturing installation built by American uranium prospector Vernon Pick. From Cayoosh Falls to the Fraser was the scene of the Cayoosh Gold Rush of the 1880s, in which 300 Chinese gold miners were estimated by the local Government Agent to have taken out around $6 million in gold. The creek's riverbed throughout this stretch was literally turned upside down and remains of Chinese gold-mills and gold-furnaces can be found near the Hydro campsite, as well as piles of washed rocks which are byproducts of Chinese mining methods.

=== "Nkoomptch" ===
Towering over the lower reaches of the canyon and Walden North as a large BC Hydro-run campground on the creek's final bottomlands near the Seton River, is Mount Brew. Brew is the highest in the northern Lillooet Ranges at 9970'; the elevation of the confluence is about 700', the edge of Brew's summit above, less than a mile to the south, is around 8800'. A buttress of Mount Brew lies to the southeast of the confluence, even closer and overhanging the lower Seton River, and features an 8000' near-sheer wall, while on the north across the Seton River are the last ramparts of Mission Ridge, reaching up to 6000' in this area, which is also the terminus of the Cayoosh Range. The combined gorge-walls of Seton Lake, the Cayoosh Range, Cayoosh Canyon, Mount Brew and its northward buttress, and the last buttress of Mission Ridge, form a large canyon complex ranging from 5000' to 7000' which also is a zone of extreme aridity and high summer temperatures, featuring lizards, cactus, and sagebrush. "Nkoomptch" is the historical name for this locality historically and means "water crossing over" in the St'at'imcets language. In this locality, Governor Seymour commissioned one of the Interior's three first flour mills in 1862, the others being at Big Bar 60 km up the Fraser, in times when the Lillooet District produced mostly grain, as a measure to secure food supplies for the Cariboo Gold Rush. A store was also located in this area, operated by Dan Hurley, a Lillooet rancher and hotelier, as this was the route of the wagon road from the foot of Seton Lake, the last water leg of the Douglas Road, into Lillooet.

Cayoosh Creek's last reaches are unusual in that they are bridged by a canal, the Seton Canal, which is part of the last phase of the Bridge River Power Project and feeds a powerhouse on the Fraser just south of the Seton River's confluence.

== Name ==
There are differing accounts over how the stream acquired its name.

"Cayoosh" is the local form of "cayuse", and in the Lillooet and Chilcotin regions refers to a particular strain of Indian mountain pony

The traditional indigenous name of the stream is said to be Tsammuk and/or Tsho-ha-mous.

== See also ==
- List of tributaries of the Fraser River
- List of rivers of British Columbia
