= Bridge River Power Project =

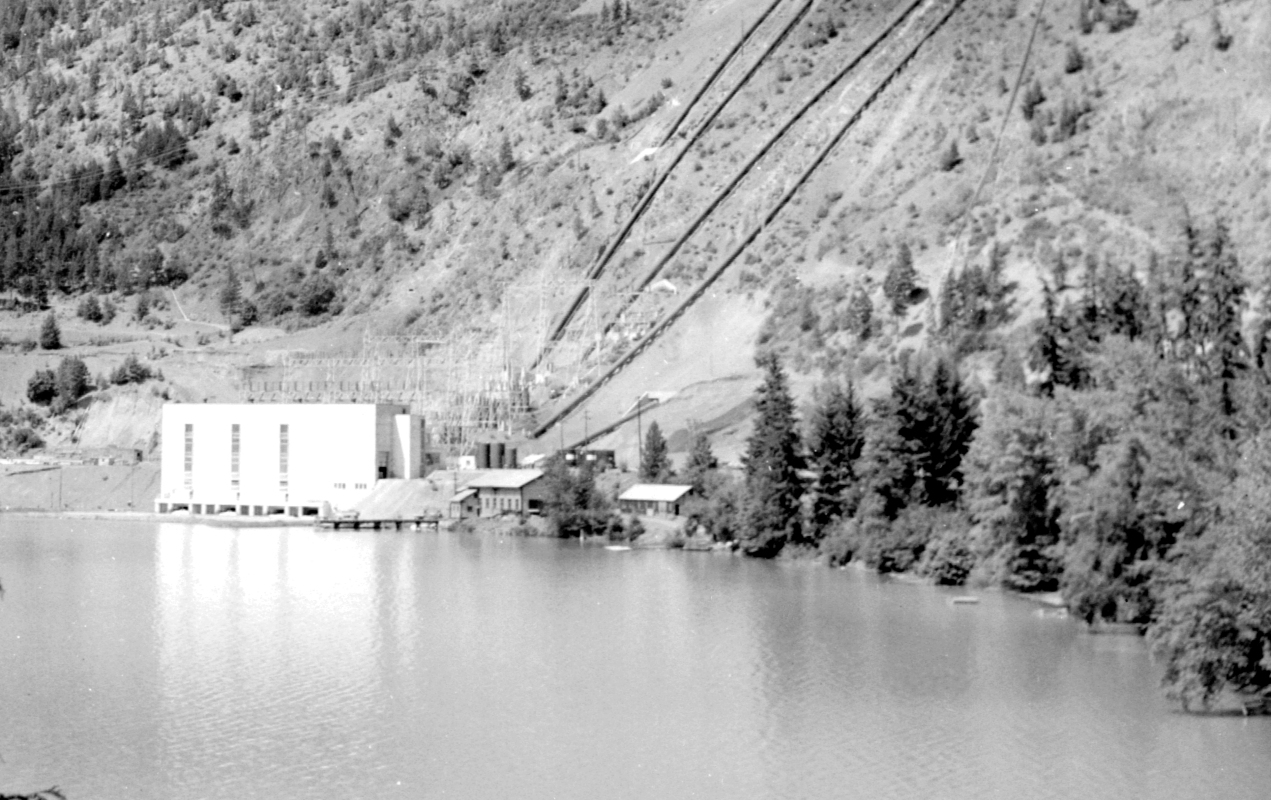
Bridge River No. 1 Powerhouse on Seton Lake, 1950s, looking west. The townsite is immediately out of frame to the left

The Bridge River Power Project is a hydroelectric power development in the Canadian province of British Columbia, located in the Lillooet Country between Whistler and Lillooet. It harnesses the power of the Bridge River, a tributary of the Fraser, by diverting it through a mountainside to the separate drainage basin of Seton Lake, utilizing a system of three dams, four powerhouses and a canal.

== Discovery and original development ==
The potential for the project was first observed in 1912 by Geoffrey Downton, a land surveyor, who noticed the short horizontal distance between the flow of the Bridge River, just above its impressive canyon, and the much-lower Seton Lake. It was fifteen years before this observation was put to task, and not until 1927 that a private company first bored a tunnel through Mission Ridge (also known as Mission Mountain), which separates the basins of the Bridge and Seton systems. This tunnel was completed in 1931, but work on the project was suspended due to the Great Depression and the Second World War. Construction of a powerhouse to utilize the diversion did not begin until 1946.

== Bridge River Townsite ==
A townsite, or employees village, was built in the 1920s adjacent to the construction site. It was developed as a model community, with a community hall, a combined rink and tennis court, lavish guest houses for visiting executives, parks, a school, a private beach and a full-service hotel which served the busy travel trade over the mountain to the goldfields towns of Bralorne, Pioneer and Minto. Mostly abandoned during the 1930s, the townsite - known as "Bridge River" (although not actually on that river) - was used during the war as a relocation centre for Japanese-Canadians exiled from the Coast in the wake of the Japanese attack on Pearl Harbor. Its most notable resident during that period was Masajiro Miyazaki, an osteopath who was engaged by the provincial police in Lillooet to serve as coroner despite wartime restrictions, and stayed on as the town doctor for years after. Miyazaki was conferred an Order of Canada award for his service to that community.

== Post-war completion ==
Following the war, growing power requirements led to a fast-tracking of the project, which was the largest at the time and one of the most staggering ever undertaken because of the terrain and spectacular setting of the project. Materials for the diversion dams in the Bridge River and all equipment for the powerhouse to be built at Lajoie, near Gold Bridge, had to be trucked over the 3,500-foot (1,100 m) climb and dozens of switchbacks of the tortuous Mission Mountain Road, which was also shared with industrial and passenger traffic to and from the busy mine towns. The only access to the railhead for that road, at Shalalth, was via the rail line itself from Lillooet and, to get there, via the old pre-Trans-Canada "Cariboo Highway" from Hope to Lytton that had not been upgraded much since it was built in the 1920s.

The first generator was installed at what would become Bridge River Powerhouse No. 1 in 1948, with three more generators added by 1954, giving the plant a total output of 180,000 kilowatts - easily the largest in the province at that time. A second tunnel, with two large penstocks, was built to supply a second powerhouse on the far side of the townsite. Work on this powerhouse (called No. 2) was carried out while the tunnel that would supply it was being bored, and it would have four generators, officially opening in 1960 with a generating capacity of 248,000 kilowatts. Geoffrey Downton, the "discoverer" of the project, was invited to push the "start" button to fire up the No. 2 generators.

== Dams, powerhouses and reservoirs ==
The No. 1 Powerhouse is fed by four penstocks, the No. 2 Powerhouse by two much larger ones, which supply the water from Carpenter Lake, created by Terzaghi Dam, from the tunnels bored through Mission Mountain. Terzaghi Dam was immediately above the pass, just below the tunnel intakes and Mission Creek, which is the valley on the north side of the pass. It was often known as Mission Dam before being officially named Terzaghi Dam, after Karl Terzaghi, the "father of modern soil mechanics" who was the chief consultant. Another dam, Lajoie Dam, three kilometres above the gold-mining district's supply town of Gold Bridge, was built at Lajoie, 60 kilometres above the diversion dam. Construction of Lajoie Dam began in 1949 as a simple storage dam to regulate reservoir levels for the Bridge River plants, but in 1955 it was raised to its full height of 287 feet (87 m), creating Downton Lake, 534,300 acree-feet of water, elev. 2,460 feet (750 m). A one-generator powerhouse was completed in 1957 with a capacity of 22,000 kilowatts, much of that destined to feed the power demands of the Bralorne and Pioneer Mines and their associated towns, only ten miles away, as well as other residents and towns elsewhere in the upper Bridge River valley.

Terzaghi Dam, lower in crest than Lajoie Dam at 180 feet (55 m) but also the most important structure in the project, was completed in 1960, creating Carpenter Lake. It replaced an earlier structure, a cofferdam, which had been built across the Bridge River to force its flow into the Powerhouse No. 1 diversion tunnel, which was open and operating in 1948. The rising lake waters flooded out several large ranches and homesteads in the valley, some of which dated back to the 1890s, and also the short-lived company town of Minto City, which lay at the confluence of Gun Creek with the former Bridge River, despite a long holdout by Wally O'Keeffe; owner of the Rexmount Ranch and his attempts to rally the people of Minto against the project.

Seton Lake existed before the project, but a small diversion dam at its outlet raised the level of the lake by about 10 feet (3.0 m). From the lake's outlet, a specially built canal carries the diverted flow of the Bridge River to the last possible bit of "head" before the Fraser River, a differential of only 140' but enough to generate 42,000 kilowatts. The canal, known as Seton Canal, is highly unusual in that it bridges both Seton and Cayoosh Creeks before being briefly tunneled through a low rock bluff to the Seton Powerhouse, which is right on the Fraser River just below the town of Lillooet.

== BC Hydro assumes control ==
The British Columbia Electric Company, successor to the Bridge River Power Company on this project and the main electrical utility in the province, was taken over and nationalized by the British Columbia government in 1961 and became the larger part of BC Hydro and Power Authority, a Crown Corporation.

== Structures ==
- Lajoie Dam and Powerhouse
- Terzaghi Dam
- Bridge River Powerhouses No. 1 and No. 2
- Seton Dam and Canal
- Seton Powerhouse (aka Lillooet Powerhouse)

== Environmental impact ==
A full official assessment of this project's impact on the local and provincial environment has never been completed, and was not required at the time of its construction. Seton Lake, once pristine and renowned for its crystalline sky-blue colour, was turned cold and opaque by the diverted waters of the Bridge River, which are glacial and milky-green in colour.

Damage to the fishery on both river systems involved was incalculable. Although a fish ladder was built at the Seton diversion, it is generally conceded that the project virtually wiped out the entire Bridge River salmon runs, once one of the river's largest and most important and, in so doing, caused a local famine among the area's populous fishery-dependent native bands. It was hoped that the returning Bridge River salmon would follow the smell of Bridge River water up the Seton-Cayoosh system, where a fish ladder and also a set of hatchery channels were constructed, but the fish attempted to swim directly into the tailrace of the Lillooet Powerhouse. To ameliorate this, a tunnel was bored through the moraine at the foot of Seton Lake to feed water from Cayoosh Creek into the lake near the diversion, so that the mix of waters coming out of Cayoosh Creek's confluence with the Fraser would confuse the fish and some of them would choose the creek instead, thereby finding the hatchery. This was of mixed success, and as far as many locals concerned only served to make the water at the public beach at the foot of Seton Lake colder than it already was.

Unscheduled releases of water from Terzaghi Dam during spawning seasons in the 1990s caused a furor amongst local residents and First Nations, with a major investigation launched and Hydro now operating under strict rules for releasing water.

The most immediate and visible environmental impact of the project, however, was the inundation of the upper Bridge River Valley. Formerly a serpentine flat-bottomed valley framed by its tributary canyons and ranges, the valley had been home to a number of prospectors, settlers, lodges and others who were forced from their homes by the rising waters of Carpenter Lake, which also drowned what was left of Minto City (there were no residents in the area of what is now Downton Lake). Acrimony over the evictions continued for many years, and feelings from old-timers about the fate of their valley remain strong among their offspring. Much of Carpenter Lake today is mudflat when reservoir levels are low, and for many years it was a stark reminder of older environmental standards, with vast forests of dead trees sticking out of the frigid, milky-blue glacial waters. Some feel that the shift in temperature regimes in the two river basins affected local climate patterns, with the upper valley now more moderate in climate and the Seton valley considerably cooler.

Programs in the 1980s to engage prisoners and others in the removal of these trees were launched during low-water levels, and the lake today is largely safe for boating, and while stocked for fishing it is still inadvisable for swimming due to its icy-cold water.

== See also ==
- Shalalth
- Seton Portage
- Lillooet
- Minto City
- List of generating stations in BC
