= Cadwallader Creek =

Tributary of the Hurley River in Canada

Coordinates: 50.767°N 122.8008°W

Cadwallader Creek is an important tributary of the Hurley River in the Bridge River Country of the British Columbia Interior, Canada, most notable for its role as the home of the Bralorne and Pioneer Mines and associated gold claims and workings. Less than twenty miles in length, the creek is joined by Noel Creek within the area of the town of Bralorne, and just below Bralorne joins the Hurley River just above Hurley Falls and that river's ten-mile canyon prior to its own confluence with the Bridge River near the town Gold Bridge. Standard Creek, a short tributary of Cadwallader Creek near its upper end, connects via McGillvray Pass to the creek of the same name and, on Anderson Lake far below, the resort townlet of McGillivray Falls. One-time plans to build a cog railway to the mines from the Pacific Great Eastern at McGillivray Falls were never fulfilled.

Cadwallader Creek forms the southwestern boundary of the Bendor Range and delimits it from the Noel Range and Birkenhead Ranges to its west.

The Creek was named after a Welshman Evan Cadwallader. His surname ultimately derives from a medieval Welsh king Cadwaladr c.655 – 682 AD. He built a sawmill in Lillooet in 1862 and guided a company of Italian miners through the valley in 1865.

== See also ==
- List of rivers of British Columbia
