= Terzaghi Dam =

Dam across the Bridge River Valley in British Columbia, Canada

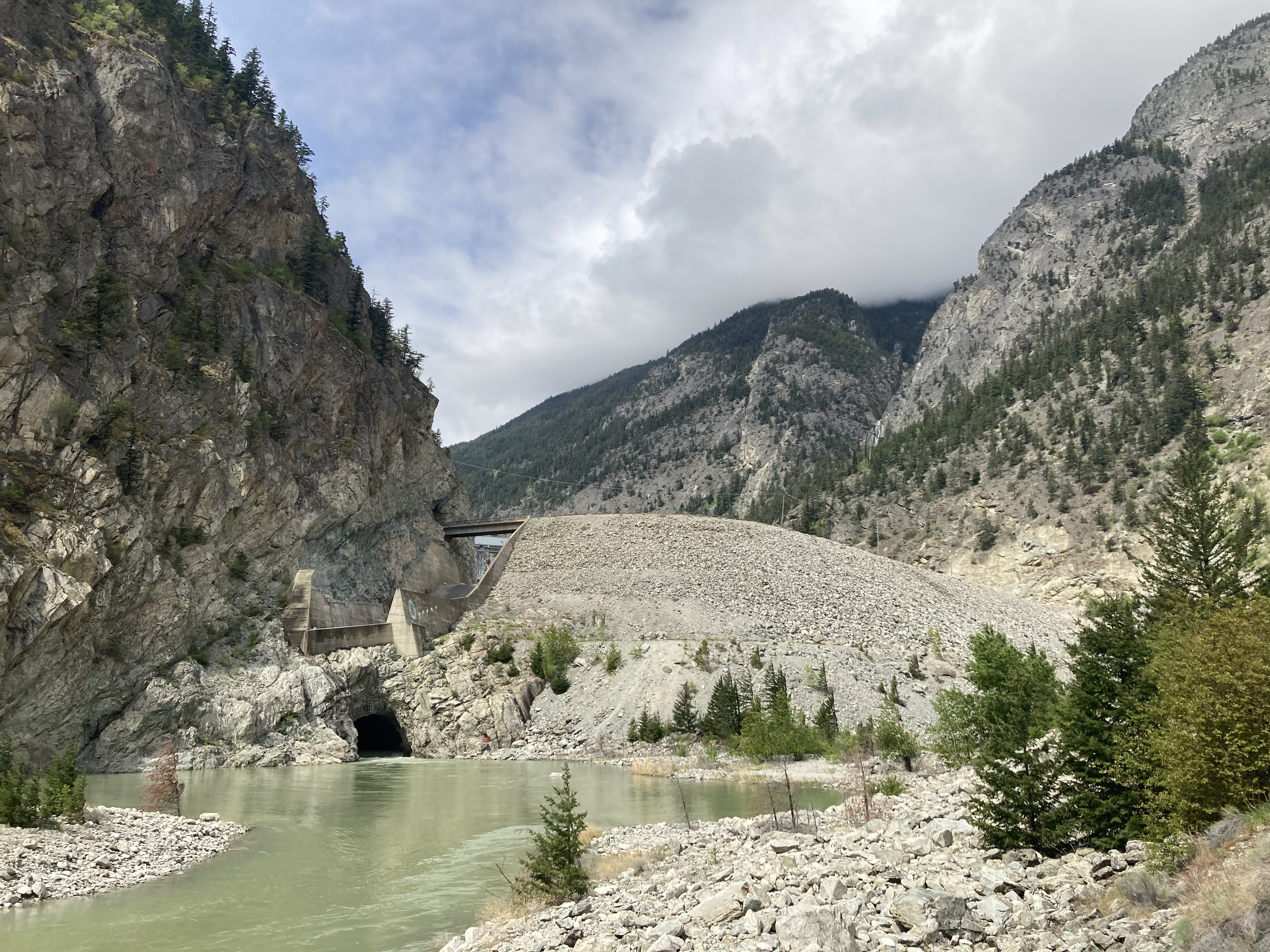
- Country: Canada
- Purpose: Power
- Owner: BC Hydro

Dam and spillways
- Impounds: Bridge River
- Height (foundation): 55 meters

Reservoir
- Creates: Carpenter Lake

Terzaghi Dam is the key diversion dam in BC Hydro's Bridge River Power Project. It forms the project's largest reservoir, Carpenter Lake west of Lillooet. Originally known as the Mission Dam, it was renamed Terzaghi Dam in 1965 to honor Karl von Terzaghi, the civil engineer who founded the science of soil mechanics. It is located about 30 km up the Bridge River from its confluence with the Fraser.

It stands at the head of the Big Canyon of the Bridge River, completely blocking the river, which is diverted through two tunnels through Mission Mountain to a pair of powerhouses on Seton Lake. The difference in elevation between Carpenter Lake, the reservoir formed by Terzaghi Dam, and the two powerhouses on Seton Lake is c. 410 m, which in combination with the flow of the entire Bridge River generates 480 megawatts in electrical power.

Completed in the 1950s, it was the expansion of a concept first launched in the 1920s by the Bridge River Power Development Co. but abandoned due to rising costs and collapsed investments as a result of the Great Depression. It was later resumed by BC Electric during the post-war boom after World War II and a first diversion and powerhouse completed in 1948 (180MW), the second in 1960 (300MW).

Projects organizing timed releases of water through Terzaghi Dam to enable fish-spawning ecology in the nearly-dry Bridge River below the dam are underway.

== See also ==
- Minto City, British Columbia
- Shalalth, British Columbia
