= Downton Lake =

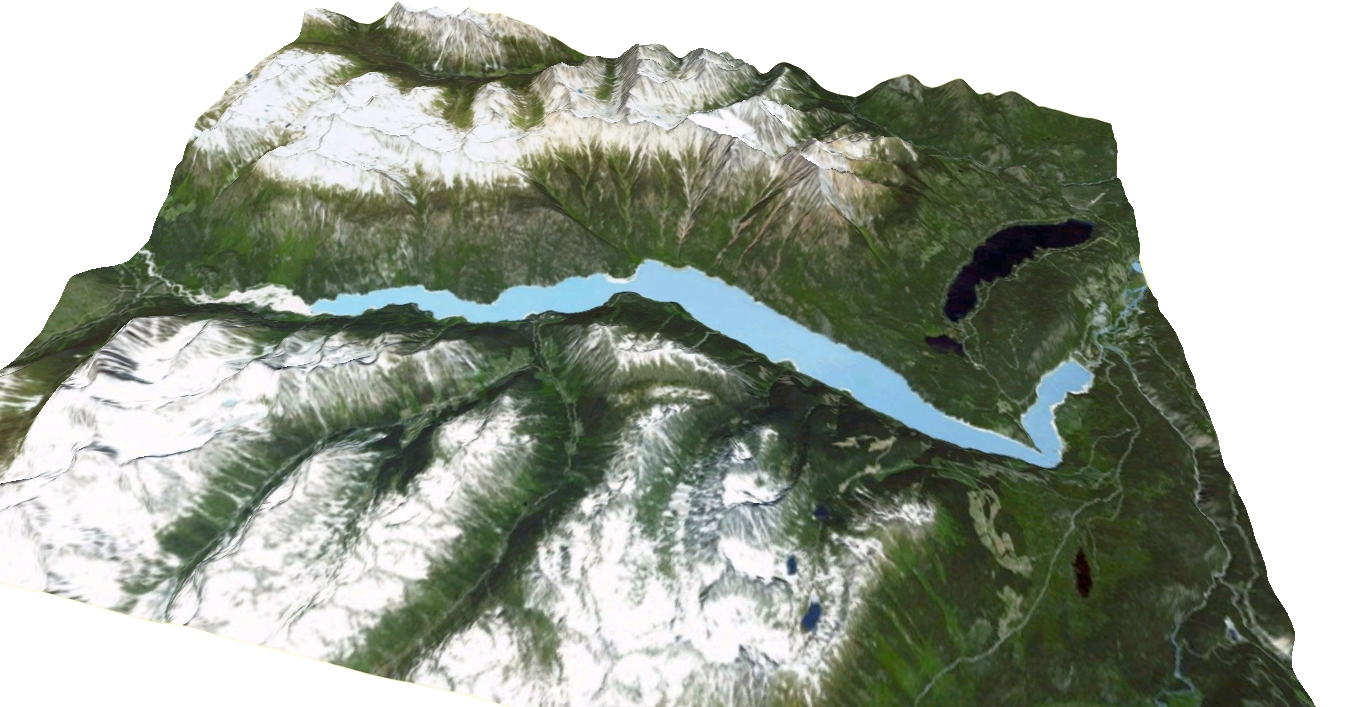
- Downton Lake 3d

- Location within British Columbia
- Location: Bridge River Country, British Columbia
- Coordinates: 50°50′41″N 123°00′31″W
- Type: reservoir
- Basin countries: Canada

Downton Lake, originally Downton Reservoir, and also known as Downton Lake Reservoir, is a reservoir in the Bridge River Country of the Interior of British Columbia, Canada, formed by Lajoie Dam, the uppermost of the series of dams and diversions of the Bridge River Power Project.

It was named for Geoffrey M. Downton, BCLS (British Columbia Land Surveyor), credited with first noting the hydroelectric potential inherent in the elevation differential between the Bridge River and Seton Lake on opposing sides of Mission Ridge above Shalalth in 1912. Mount Downton in the Chilcotin District is also named for him.

As of 2013, a new power plant is being built at Jamie Creek, about 17 km from the eastern end of the Lake.

== See also ==
- List of lakes of British Columbia
