= Grace Eiko Thomson =

Japanese-Canadian internment camp survivor (1933–2024)

- Born: Eiko Nishikihama; October 15, 1933; Richmond, British Columbia, Canada
- Died: July 11, 2024 (aged 90); Winnipeg, Manitoba, Canada
- Education: University of Manitoba (BFA); University of Leeds (Masters)
- Occupations: Curator, memoirist

Grace Eiko Thomson (born Eiko Nishikihama; October 15, 1933 – July 11, 2024) was a Japanese-Canadian World War II internee. She was the founder of the Nikkei National Museum and Cultural Centre in British Columbia and a memoirist.

== Early life ==
Eiko Nishikihama was born at the Japanese Fishermen's Hospital in the Steveston neighbourhood of Richmond, British Columbia, Canada, on October 15, 1933. Her father, Taguchi Torasaburo, and mother, Sawae, were both naturalized Canadian citizens, having emigrated from Japan, and she was one of five children the couple raised in Vancouver's Japantown, or Paueru-gai. In 1942, the family was upended when they were forcibly relocated to an internment site in Minto City, in accordance with the War Measures Act. The family was not allowed to return to their coastal home after the war, moving to Middlechurch, Manitoba, and eventually settling in Winnipeg in 1949 when restrictions on the movement of Japanese Canadians were finally lifted. In 1959, she married Alistair MacDonald Thomson, and the couple would have two children of their own.

== Career ==
Thomson always had a keen interest in the arts and earned a Bachelor of Fine Arts degree from the University of Manitoba in 1977 as a mature student and later a master's degree from the University of Leeds. She has worked as a curator at art galleries in Manitoba, Saskatchewan, and British Columbia, and as an advisor to the Sanavik Inuit Cooperative in Nunavut. In the 1990s, she returned to Vancouver to help care for her mother, accepting a position at the Burnaby Art Gallery.

In 1995, Thomson was asked to coordinate an event for artists of Japanese heritage from across Canada, sparking a renewed interest in the history of her community. In 2000, she became the inaugural curator and director of the new Japanese Canadian National Museum (now the Nikkei National Museum and Cultural Centre). She resigned from that position in 2002, but continued to collaborate with the museum as a guest curator. From 2005 until her 2010 retirement, she was president of the National Association of Japanese Canadians.

== Chiru Sakura: Falling Cherry Blossoms ==
In 2021, Thomson published a memoir based on her family's experience, Chiru Sakura: Falling Cherry Blossoms, published by Caitlin Press. At 84, Thomson's mother began keeping a journal in Japanese, recording her memories and family history. The memoir weaves together Thomson's translations of passages from her mother's diary along with her own stories of identity, trauma and racism and her efforts to find social justice for herself and others.

Chiru Sakura was shortlisted for the 2022 City of Vancouver Book Award.

== Death ==
Thomson died at her Winnipeg home on July 11, 2024, at the age of 90.
