= Tsal'alh Seton Train =

Railway service in British Columbia, Canada

Overview
- Locale: Lillooet Country
- Predecessor: Kaoham Shuttle

Technical
- Track gauge: 4 ft 8 1/2 in (1,435 mm) standard gauge

Kaoham Shuttle
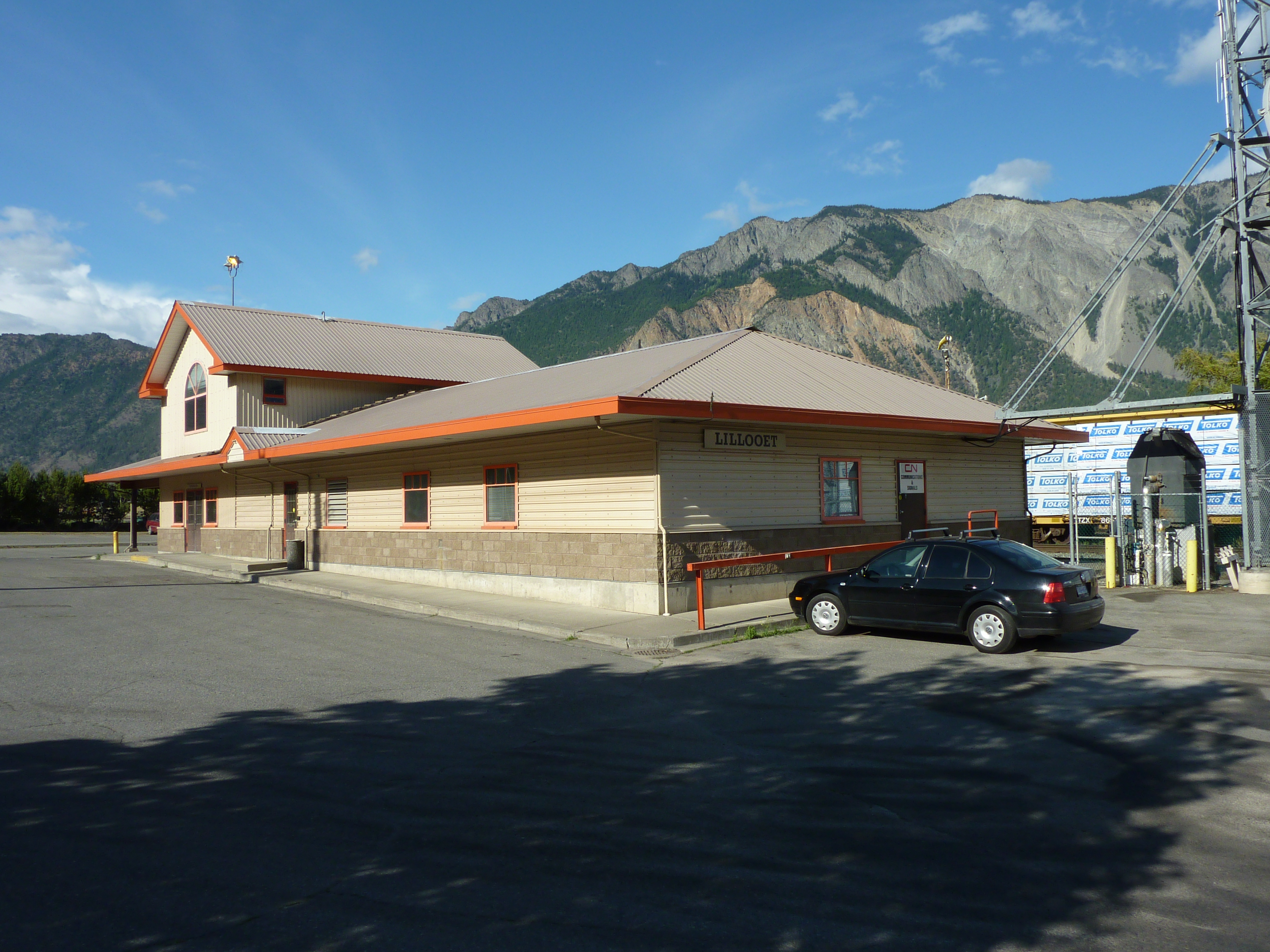
- Lillooet train station, 2011

The Tsal'alh Seton Train is a Lillooet–Seton Portage passenger bus and rail service along the northern shore of Seton Lake in the Squamish-Lillooet region of southwestern British Columbia. By BC Highway 99, the eastern terminus is about 252 kilometres (157 mi) northeast of Vancouver.

== Earlier railway shuttles ==
In 1934, a Lillooet–Shalalth shuttle was established, and a 23-metre (75 ft) diameter turntable was installed 2.3 kilometres (1.4 mi) east of Seton Portage, because the initial gasoline-powered cars could only be operated from one end. This was not the case for gas car no. 107, bought in 1949, but built in 1926. In 1958, the western terminus moved to Seton Portage. The railbus hauled one or two trailers loaded with automobiles and trucks on a twice daily return service. The completion of access roads and the introduction of new Budd Rail Diesel Cars on the BC Rail daily intercity service in the late 1950s prompted the end of this shuttle in 1961.

In 1979, a Seton Portage–Lillooet morning school shuttle commenced. The cost was shared equally between the Lillooet School District, Seton Lake First Nation, and BC Hydro (which operates the Shalalth powerhouses). The high school pupils named the single passenger car behind the locomotive as the "Budd Wiser". Students returned home on the southbound intercity passenger train.

In November 2002, BC Rail ended all passenger service between North Vancouver and Prince George. It was replaced by the service of a train known as the "Kaoham Shuttle". In 2001, the railway purchased a pair of gasoline-powered railbus units from Jim Busby Services in California, who had rebuilt the Fairmont A8 speeders. West Coach International of California carried out further modifications, with the work completed by BC Rail upon arrival in Lillooet. After the inaugural run on October 31, 2002, regular operation started the next day. "Budd-Lites" was soon their nickname. These units were initially numbered TU-108 and TU-109 by BC Rail to maintain the gas car numbering sequence but later renumbered to 10800 and 10900 by Canadian National Railway (CN) after acquiring BC Rail.

The Kaoham Shuttle operated between 2001 and 2021. It was replaced with a rail-road bus and renamed the Tsal'alh Seton Train in 2022.

== Historical operation ==
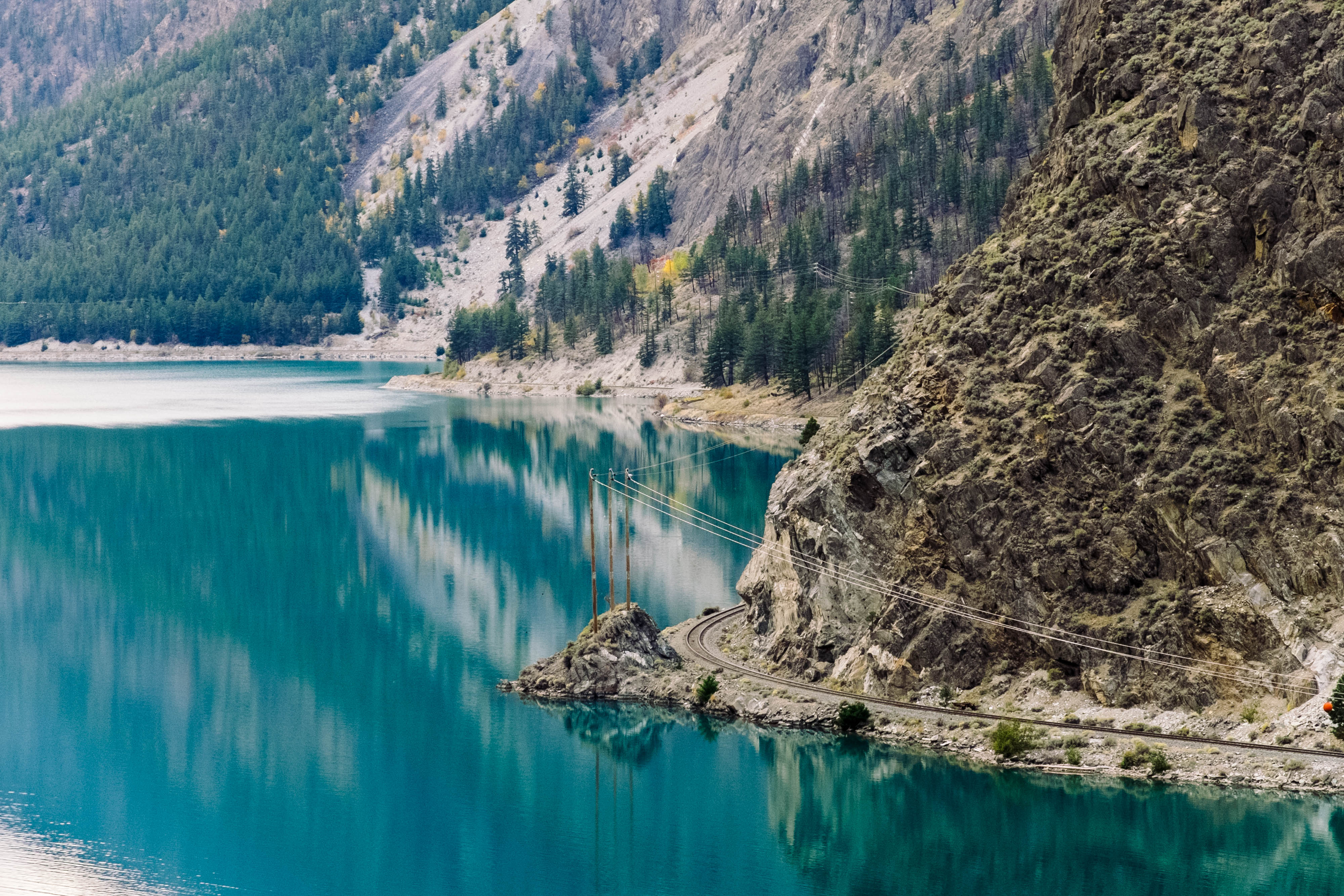
View westward of the railway track beside Seton Lake, 2017.

This enterprise on the CN Squamish Subdivision is a partnership between CN and the Seton Lake First Nation. The former provided the driver and train. The latter handled bookings and ticketing. The service primarily exists for the isolated residents (mainly First Nations) of Seton Portage and Shalalth to reach Lillooet for school, shopping, or medical needs. Consequently, most days, the train departed Seton Portage in the morning and returned in the afternoon. On Fridays, two round trips occurred. When the train arrived, the crew briefly opened the Lillooet station waiting area. With an intermediate stop at Shalalth, the trip lasted just over an hour each way.

The BBC described the picturesque journey beside the lake and through the tunnel as "Canada's greatest hidden rail trip".

Service farther west to D'Arcy was advertised as available by advance appointment; however, since at least 2024, service to D'Arcy is not available.

== Shalalth Tunnel ==
The tunnel lies immediately west of Shalalth. The initial 130-metre (427 ft) tunnel was timber lined and opened in 1915. The second 320-metre (1,060 ft) tunnel, built in 1957, resulted from a line relocation to accommodate the hydro building construction. The third 1,200-metre (3,940 ft) tunnel was opened in 1989.

== Operation ==
The vehicle is a modified IC Bus CE Series, using the pre-existing railway between Lillooet and Seton Portage. Service runs 7 days a week, with a modified school schedule. The journey takes approximately an hour and 40 minutes to complete one way.
