= Moonbeam Creek (British Columbia) =

- Location of the mouth of the creek in British Columbia

Location
- Country: Canada
- Province: British Columbia
- Region: British Columbia Interior
- Regional District: Thompson-Nicola
- Land District: Kamloops Division Yale

Physical characteristics
- Source: unnamed slope
  - coordinates: 52°24′57″N 118°58′11″W
  - elevation: 2,460 m (8,070 ft)
- Mouth: North Thompson River
  - coordinates: 52°27′39″N 119°08′16″W
  - elevation: 730 m (2,400 ft)

Basin features
- River system: Pacific Ocean drainage basin

Moonbeam Creek is a stream in Thompson-Nicola Regional District in the Interior region of British Columbia, Canada. It is in the Pacific Ocean drainage basin and is a left tributary of the North Thompson River. The nearest communities to the mouth of the creek on British Columbia Highway 5 are Blue River 40 kilometres (25 mi) south and Valemount 50 kilometres (31 mi) north; the mouth of the creek is just downstream of confluence of the North Thompson River and the Albreda River, where the North Thompson River turns 90° right and heads south.

== Course ==
The creek begins at an unnamed slope to the southwest of the peak of Dominion Mountain, part of the Monashee Mountains. It flows west, passes under the Canadian National Railway transcontinental main line (used by freight traffic and the Via Rail Canadian train) and British Columbia Highway 5, and reaches its mouth at the North Thompson River, between the railway points of Lempriere downstream and Goswell upstream, dropping from 2,460 metres (8,070 ft) to 730 metres (2,400 ft) in elevation along the route. The North Thompson River flows via the Thompson River and the Fraser River to the Pacific Ocean.
