= Carpenter Lake =

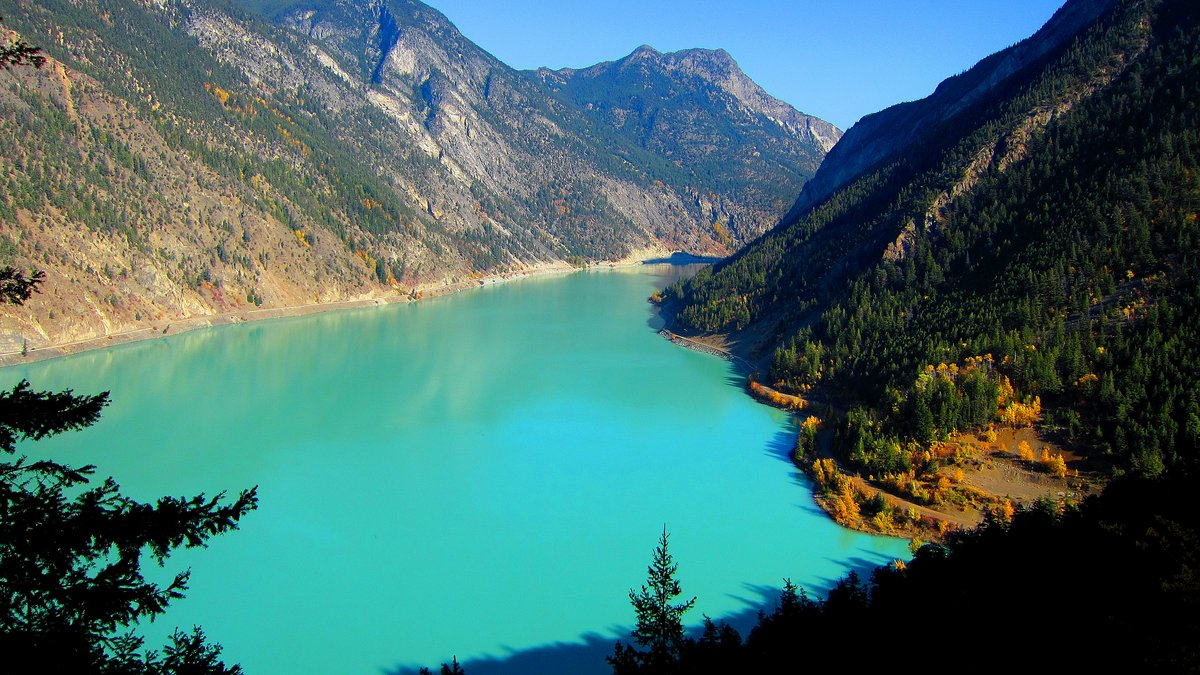
- Carpenter Lake

- Location within British Columbia
- Location: British Columbia
- Coordinates: 50°51′N 122°30′W
- Type: reservoir
- Primary inflows: Bridge River
- Primary outflows: Tunnel/penstock to Seton Lake, Bridge River
- Basin countries: Canada
- Max. length: 50 km (31 mi)
- Surface area: 50 km^{2} (19 sq mi)

Carpenter Lake, officially Carpenter Lake Reservoir, is the largest of the three reservoirs of the Bridge River Power Project, which is located in the mountains west of Lillooet, British Columbia. The lake is about 185 kilometres north of the province's major city of Vancouver and is formed by the 1951 diversion of the Bridge River by Terzaghi Dam into Seton Lake via a tunnel through Mission Mountain, which separates the Seton and Bridge drainages. Several ranches and homesteads in the broad serpentine of the upper Bridge River basin were flooded out by the hydro project, which changed the character of the upper valley forever.

Carpenter Lake is about 50 kilometres in length, although its upper reaches beyond the flooded gold mining town of Minto City are usually mudflat due to fluctuations in the level of the reservoir. Its total area approaches 50 square kilometres.

== Name ==
The lake is named after a Mr. Carpenter, an engineer who first moved to Canada in 1909 and performed much of the early design work on the power project for the firm of Sanderson and Porter, and supervised construction of the first tunnels through Mission Ridge from 1927 to 1931. He retired in 1944.

== See also ==
- List of lakes of British Columbia
- Downton Lake
- Lajoie Dam
