= Minto City =

Minto City Minto, Minto Mine, Minto Mines
- Company town
- Location of Minto City in British Columbia
- Coordinates: 50°53′27″N 122°46′40″W
- Country: Canada
- Province: British Columbia

Minto City, often called just Minto, sometimes Minto Mines_{,} Minto Mine, Skumakum, or "land of plenty", was a gold mining town in the Bridge River Valley of British Columbia from 1930 to 1936, located at the confluence of that river with Gun Creek, one of its larger tributaries. The mine prospect was never much successful although a model townsite was built by promoter "Big Bill" Davidson, who imported soil to build a specially-built rodeo ground and baseball diamond on the rocky site. The larger mine of Bralorne was nearby. The mine shut down in 1936 due to productivity issues, but restarted in 1940. The valley has since been significantly altered when most of the vestiges of the town were inundated by the waters of the Carpenter Lake reservoir following completion of the Bridge River Power Project. In 1941, around two dozens of Japanese Canadian families were relocated to Minto Mine, and ordered to live in the empty miners' houses due to the impacts of the war.

The community was originally known as Mento's Landing, after C.R. Mento, who had the sternwheel ferry Minto built in 1900. The name gradually changed to Minto Landing and then Minto.

== Minto Mine ==
The Minto Mine operated from 1934 to 1940 during which over 2130 metres of underground work was done, and a total of 80,650 tonnes (88,900 tons) of ore grading 6.8 grams of gold and 19.9 grams of silver per tonne was produced, totalling 546 kilograms (19,300 ounces) of gold and 1,573 kilograms (55,500 ounces) of silver, 9,673 kilograms (341,200 ounces) of copper and 56,435 kilograms (1,990,700 ounces) of lead.

By the opening of World War II, the combination of poor mineral showings and most men going away to war brought the Minto mine to a standstill.

== Japanese Canadian Internment History ==
Since Canada declared war on Japan, all Japanese Canadians over the age of 16 were forced to register with the B.C. Security Commission (BCSC), despite the fact that majority of them were naturalized Canadians. As of 1941, Minto was one of five locations in the Bridge River-Lillooet area which were used for Japanese-Canadian relocation centres. At Minto, the population of Japanese Canadian reached a trim 325. The internment of Japanese Canadians was initiated from fears of Japanese forces after the attack on Pearl Harbor in 1941. In December 1941, Canada created the security zone, which entailed the removal of all Japanese Canadians within 100 miles of the west coast. Men between the ages of 18 and 45 were the first ones to relocate in order to build road camps in the interior of the province. By September 30, 1942, all Japanese Canadian were forced out of homes, and the government took away all properties previously owned by families, aside from goods they brought to the internment sites such as food, canned goods, tea, dishes, pots, and pans. Family groups who had wealth were allowed to leave the Protected Area before the deadline of April 1, 1942, to become part of the self-supporting families that could live and work in these selected internment sites. Families who moved to Minto had the opportunity to stay together by relocating. By paying for the self-supporting site, the internees could avoid restriction and punitive practices, and they could work, operate shops and businesses, and place their children in school within the camp.

During the war, approximately 25 families moved into some empty houses, while others were sold off at a low price by the government. Most families in Minto were sent from Japantown of the Downtown Eastside in Vancouver. Families lived off pre-war savings and worked in trucking, logging, and the sawmill industry. The residents' hard work and resiliency built Minto into one of the self-supporting internment locations with electricity and indoor plumbing. At this time, the Japanese-Canadian presence transformed the town, which soon had vegetable and flower gardens, with the town's crops becoming a source of produce for the larger mining towns nearby.

== Life in Minto ==
The self-supporting sites had wealthier aspects in their daily lives compared to a non self-supporting site, but they still struggled in the cold winters. Everyday, people would brush their teeth with salt, and during holidays, parents could not afford to get their kids expensive gifts so they compensated with books or dolls. Although there were some establishments like hotels, post offices, and apartment buildings, there was no clinics or hospitals. During the war, when a family member got sick, doctors had to be contacted by police to travel from a neighbour town, Bralorne, and many people had no contact with the police so they would pay cash to get hold of someone with police contact.

Children went to a schools taught by university graduates and they also learned Japanese from their parents at home. At school, students would enjoy field days, where they would participate in various activities like tug-of-war, games, and prizes. Families maintained their cultures by making food from rice, miso, shoyu, and tofu. Ofuro, Japanese baths were built in some homes Grace Eiko Thomson recalls from her book Chiru Sakura. Many gold mines in BC were idled in the 1942-45 period as they were deemed non-essential to the war effort, and the miners were moved to strategic metal copper, tungsten, mercury, lead and zinc production. Several of the mines, including Minto did not survive the enforced shutdown.

== Postwar History ==
Japanese Canadians were not allowed to relocate freely until 1949, and after the relocation to the west coast or elsewhere, the town of Minto was abandoned again.

The town was mostly abandoned and derelict in the wake of a disastrous flash flood in 1949, although the town's hotel and bar remained open until the end. The Minto Hotel was moved before the 1951 inundation by Carpenter Lake to Gold Bridge, where it operated as the Gold Bridge Hotel until burning down (a newer modern building stands on the site). At the site of Minto, there is a public campground and picnic site on the alluvial fan of Gun Creek, which is on higher ground than the old townsite. At low water, Minto's old street grid and some building foundations can still be seen, as well as the roadbed of the original Bridge River Road.

Finally, in 1958, the damming of the Bridge River by BC Hydro to create Carpenter Lake wiped out the town of Minto and erased all physical history of the internment site.

== "Cascadia Burn" ==
In recent years, the Gun Creek Campground has been the site of an art and performance festival modelled on the famous Burning Man event in Nevada. The 2013 incarnation of the event drew 60 participants, began on June 16 and ran through until the summer solstice, where the central art installation "Baboon Robot" was burned as the event's finale.

== Notable people ==
Grace Eiko Thomson - Japanese Canadian curator and author
