= Gun Creek (British Columbia) =

Creek in British Columbia

Location
- Country: Canada
- Province: British Columbia
- Regional district: Lillooet Land District

Physical characteristics
- Source: Chilcotin Ranges, Coast Mountains
- Mouth: Carpenter Lake

Basin features
- River system: Fraser River

Gun Creek is a river in the Interior of British Columbia, Canada. Gun Lake is part of the creek's basin but is not on the creek itself, but connected to it by a short stream from its northeastern end.

Located at its mouth into today's Carpenter Lake was Minto City, a gold mining town established in the 1930s and destroyed by a flood in the later 1940s.

== See also ==
- List of rivers of British Columbia
