= Mary Creek =

Coordinates: 53°4′N 122°6′W

Mary Creek is a creek in the Cariboo region of British Columbia. The creek is located in Cottonwood Country which is between Quesnel and Barkerville. Mary Creek is small tributary of John Boyd Creek which flows into the Cottonwood River. Terry Toop discovered gold on Mary Creek in the fall of 1972. The nuggets found were $150 in value, and $2,200 in gold could be found in a single yard of gravel. Bullion in 15 and 20 pound lots was shipped to a refinery in Richmond. Photographs of the nuggets were published in newspapers along the coast. Other miners moved in and staked claims around the area, but the gold was depleted in 1975.

== See also ==
- List of rivers of British Columbia
