= Seton River =

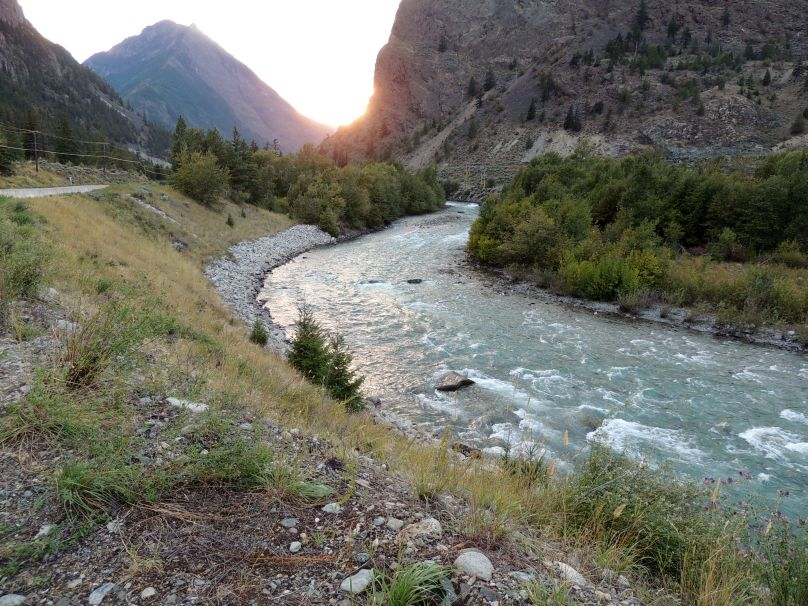

Location
- Country: Canada
- Province: British Columbia
- District: Lillooet Land District; Cariboo Land District

Physical characteristics
- Source: Anderson Lake
  - coordinates: 50°42′10″N 122°18′10″W
  - elevation: 251 m (823 ft)
- Mouth: Fraser River
  - location: Lillooet
  - coordinates: 50°40′51″N 121°55′43″W
  - elevation: 188 m (617 ft)
- Basin size: 1,020 km^{2} (390 sq mi)
- Discharge
  - location: mouth
  - average: 22.7 m^{3}/s (800 cu ft/s)
  - minimum: 2.86 m^{3}/s (101 cu ft/s)
  - maximum: 177 m^{3}/s (6,300 cu ft/s)

The Seton River is a tributary of the Fraser River in the Canadian province of British Columbia. The name is relatively new, and encompasses what had formerly been the Seton Portage River or Portage Creek (aka Portage River) and Seton Creek (which shows up on some topos as "Section Creek" due to a mis-read of old hand-written maps).

== Course ==
The Seton River originates at the foot of Anderson Lake and runs initially for only 3 km to the head of Seton Lake. From the foot of Seton Lake to the Fraser its remaining course is 5 km in length, with much of its flow diverted via the Seton Canal to the Seton Powerhouse (also known because of its location as the Lillooet Powerhouse). The river's course is generally eastward to join the Fraser River at the town of Lillooet. The upper section between the lakes was historically known as the Portage River or Seton Portage River; its flow is augmented by Whitecap Creek, from the northwest midway along its length, and by Spider Creek nearer Seton Lake. The lower section was formerly named Seton Creek and commonly mislabelled on some maps as "Section Creek", apparently a misrendering of the archaic spelling Seaton Creek. Just below the foot of Seton Lake its flow is considerably augmented by the addition of the waters of Cayoosh Creek, a name which originally applied all the way to the Fraser until the name "Seton River" was coined by the Canadian Geographic Names Board in 1950. "Cayoosh Creek" is still generally applied to the river below that point by local residents, often with the spelling "Cayoose Creek", which is also the old name of the Sekw’el’wás First Nation (i.e. "Cayoose Creek Indian Band").

Above Anderson Lake, the main watercourse of the Seton drainage is named the Gates River; numerous creeks along Anderson lake contribute substantially to the volume supplied by the Gates; these include McGillivray Creek, Haylmore Creek, and Lost Valley Creek.

== See also ==
- List of tributaries of the Fraser River
- List of rivers of British Columbia
