= Bridge River =

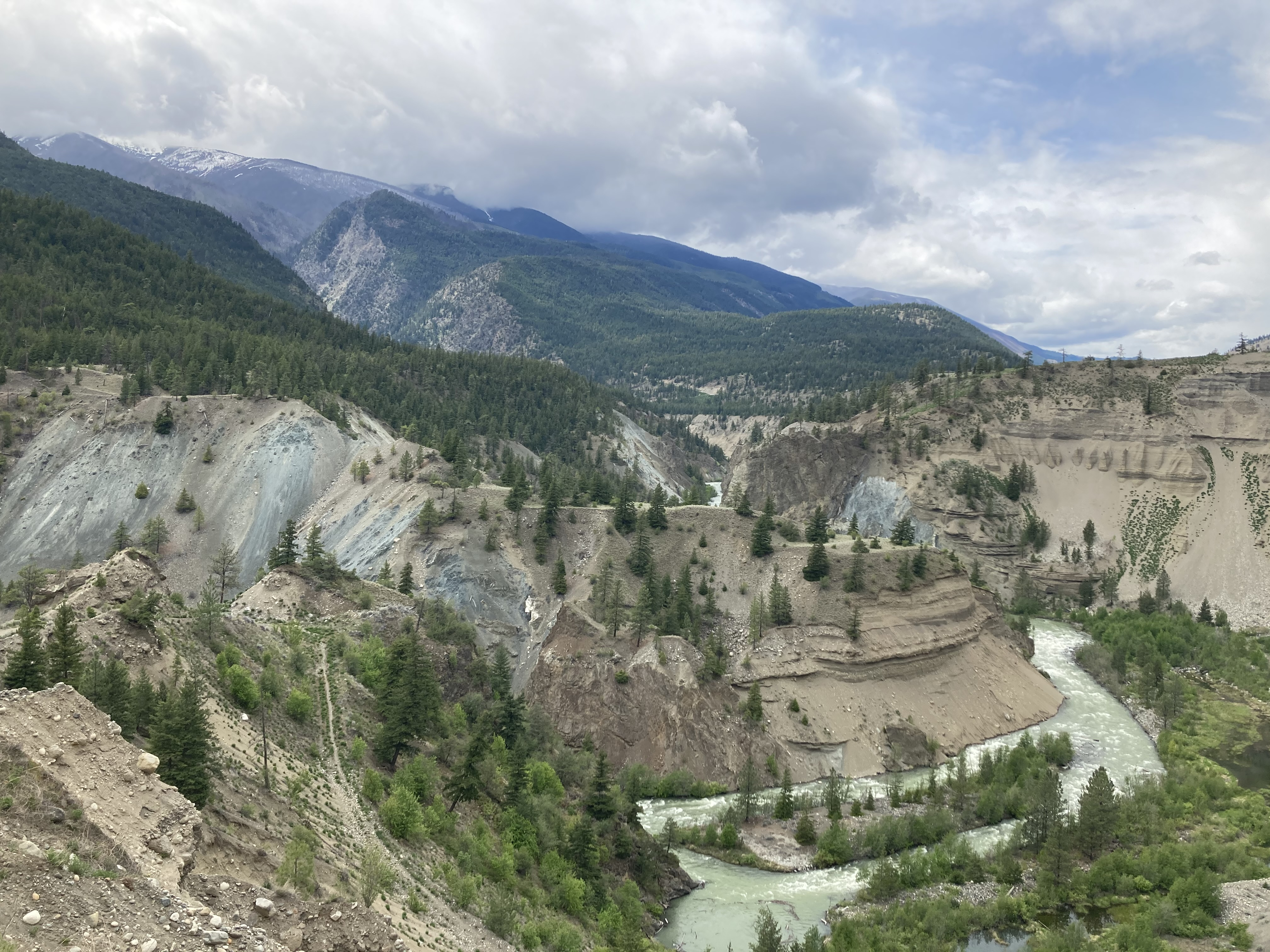
- The Bridge River in Horseshoe Canyon, near Moha
- Native name: Xwisten

Location
- Country: Canada
- Province: British Columbia
- District: Lillooet Land District

Physical characteristics
- Source: Coast Mountains
  - location: Bridge Glacier
  - coordinates: 50°51′N 123°28′W
- Mouth: Fraser River
  - coordinates: 50°45′N 121°56′W
- Length: 120 km (75 mi)
- Basin size: 4,660 km^{2} (1,800 sq mi)

The Bridge River in southern British Columbia, Canada, flows southeast from the Coast Mountains. Until 1961, it was a major tributary of the Fraser River, entering that stream about six miles upstream from the town of Lillooet; its flow, however, was near-completely diverted into Seton Lake with the completion of the Bridge River Power Project, with most of the river's water now entering the Fraser just south of Lillooet as a result. The Bridge River hydroelectric complex, operated by BC Hydro, consists of three successive dams, providing water for four hydro power plants with the total rated power of total 492 megawatts.

== Name ==
Its name in the Lillooet language is Xwisten (pronounced Hwist'n, sometimes spelled Nxwisten or Nxo-isten). Dubbed rivière du Font by Simon Fraser's exploring party in 1808, it was for a while known by the English version of that name, Fountain River, and some old maps show it as Shaw's River, after the name of one of Fraser's men. The river came to be called the Bridge River due to the location of a bridge across the Fraser at this point, originally a pole-structure built by the Stʼatʼimc people but replaced at the time of the Fraser Canyon Gold Rush in 1858 by a settler-run tollbridge. The Bridge River Ocean, an ancient ocean, takes its name from the Bridge River.

== Course ==
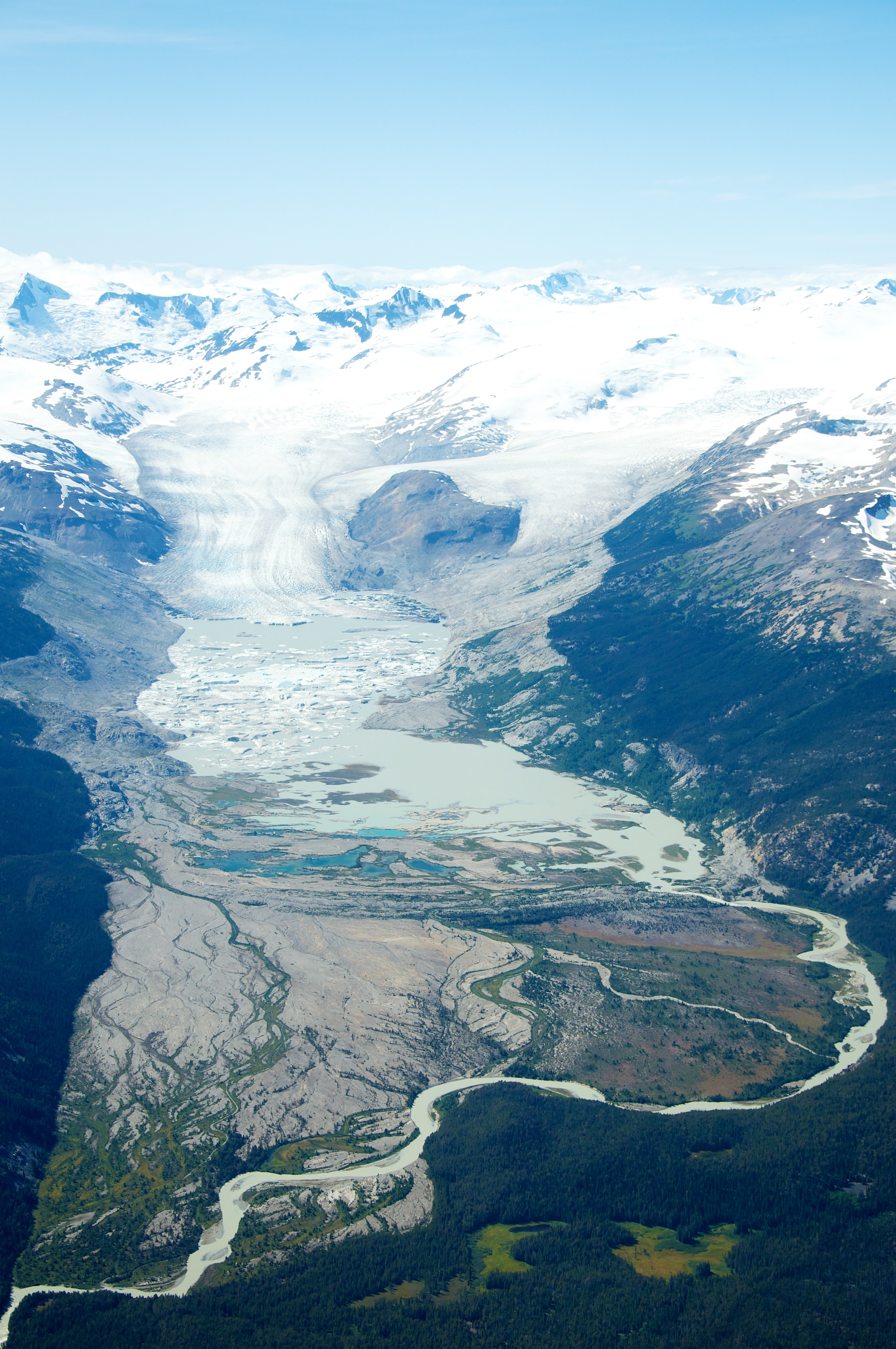
The Bridge Glacier, source of the river

The 142-kilometre-long (88 mi) river drains a region of 4,660 square kilometres (1,800 sq mi) in the Pacific Range, a sub-range of the Coast Mountains of southeastern British Columbia. Its source is the Bridge Glacier, which is part of the larger Lillooet Icefield. The Upper Bridge River, which flows from the Bridge Glacier to Downton Lake, is the only free-flowing section of the river. Downton Lake is a reservoir formed from the Lajoie Dam, the first of three dams in the Bridge River Power Project. A short outflow after the dam meets the Hurley River, and then flows into another reservoir, Carpenter Lake. This 40-kilometre-long lake is impounded by Terzaghi Dam. Near the dam, tunnels through Mission Mountain divert much of the river's waters underground to Seton Lake to facilitate power generation.

=== Canyon ===
Below Terzaghi Dam, the mostly dry riverbed runs through the immense gorge of the Bridge River Canyon. The river is joined by the Yalakom River near Horseshoe Canyon and the community of Moha.

Its confluence with the Fraser occurs at a double gorge formed by the two rivers, which are forced through narrow banks at this point and reminiscent of a fountain, near today's community of Fountain.

=== Tributaries ===
The Yalakom, whose name means 'the ewe of the mountain sheep' in the Chilcotin language, was formerly known as the North Fork of the Bridge and now provides much of the flow for the river below the diversion at Carpenter Lake. The South Fork of the Bridge River is many miles upstream, at the community of Gold Bridge, and is today known as the Hurley River (originally Hamilton's River). Several other large feeder streams contribute to the diverted flow of the Bridge, including Gun Creek, Tyaughton Creek, Marshall Creek, and Cadwallader Creek; the last-named is a tributary of the Hurley, about 15 kilometres upstream from its confluence with the Bridge.

=== Flow ===
From 1961 until 2000, the Lower Bridge River between Terzaghi Dam and the confluence with the Yalakom was almost completely dry due to water diversion. Before the dam was constructed, the mean streamflow in this stretch was 100 square metres (1,100 sq ft) per second. In 2000, BC Hydro began restoring a small, regular flow, with seasonal adjustments to mimic natural fluctuations. The mean flow of the lower Bridge below the dam is now 3 square metres (32 sq ft) per second, and riparian vegetation has recovered somewhat in that section.

== History ==
=== Fishery ===
Due to the force of the rivers at the Bridge's original confluence into the Fraser, the area has been for millennia the most important inland salmon-fishing site on the Fraser. The flow of the Bridge River, however, was near-completely diverted into Seton Lake with the completion of the Bridge River Power Project in 1961, with the water now entering the Fraser River just south of Lillooet as a result. The salmon fishery of the Bridge River was near-entirely destroyed by this diversion.

=== Gold mining ===
It is along Cadwallader Creek that the major mines of the Bridge River goldfields are located, at Bralorne and Pioneer Mine. Other mining towns and camps built around mines in the Bridge River goldfields were Minto City, Wayside, Congress, Lajoie, Haylmore and Brexton (a.k.a. Fish Lake). Around Bralorne other localities such as Ogden grew up along road right-of-ways and slips of land between the mineral claims which dominate the northwestern flank of the Bendor Range in this area, providing services not approved of by company towns, including "sporting houses", some of which were also in Gold Bridge until forced to move to Minto as Gold Bridge became larger. Other gold-mining activity is found throughout the river's basin. During the 19th century, large hydraulic mining operations lined the banks of the river for the thirty kilometres between the community of Moha, at the confluence of the Yalakom and the Bridge.

=== Hydroelectricity ===
The Bridge River Power Project harnesses the power of the Bridge River, by diverting it through a mountainside to the separate drainage basin of Seton Lake, utilizing a system of three dams, four powerhouses and a canal. Development of the system began in 1927 and was completed in 1960. The powerhouses have a maximum generating capacity of 492 MW and an average annual production of 2670 GWh. This represents 6-8 percent of the province's total hydroelectric power generation. The waters initially pass through the Lajoie Dam and powerhouse and are then diverted through tunnels and penstocks from Carpenter Reservoir to the two powerhouses on Seton Lake Reservoir.

== Environment ==
=== Spruce Lake Protected Area ===
Gun Creek and Tyaughton Creek jointly drain the south flank of the protected wilderness area known as the Spruce Lake Protected Area, popularly known as the South Chilcotin although the area is not actually in the Chilcotin, which lies north of it, but in the Chilcotin Ranges. The official designation for the area has changed since it was first proposed for a park in the 1930s, due to the efforts of the prospecting and mining community in the goldfield towns. The protectionist vs. resource extraction battle over that area has raged since that time, and names used in debates for the area have included the Charlie Cunningham Wilderness, the Spruce Lake-Eldorado Study Area, the Spruce Lake-Eldorado Management Planning Unit (SLRMP), Southern Chilcotin Mountains Provincial Park, and South Chilcotin Provincial Park. In 2007 the name was changed again to the Spruce Lake Protected Area, reflective of the government's downgrading of the area from park to mixed-use in certain areas.

== See also ==
- Bridge River Country
- Bridge River, British Columbia
- Bridge River Ocean
- Bridge River Indian Band
- Bridge River Cones
- Bridge River Ash
- Chief Hunter Jack
