= Lillooet =

- District municipality
- District of Lillooet
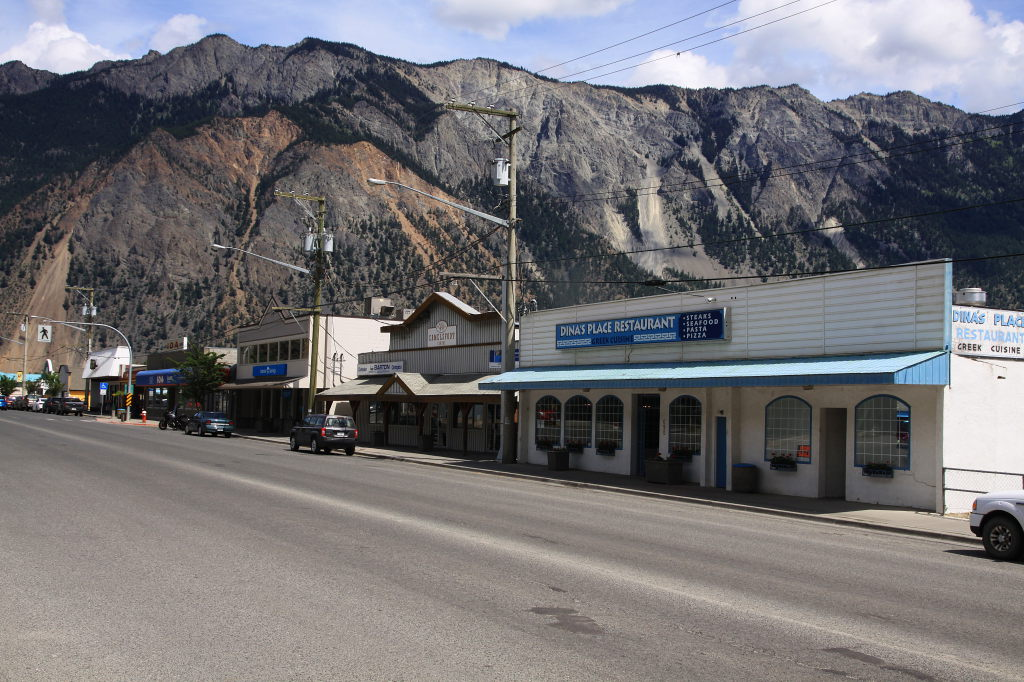
- Main Street in Downtown Lillooet

- Location of Lillooet Lillooet (Canada)
- Coordinates: 50°41′37″N 121°56′01″W
- Country: Canada
- Province: British Columbia
- Region: Lillooet-Fraser Canyon
- Regional District: Squamish-Lillooet
- Incorporated: 1946 (as village), 1996 (as district municipality)

Government
  - Mayor: Laurie Hopfl
  - Governing body: District of Lillooet
  - MLA: Tony Luck (BC Conservative)
  - MP: Brad Vis (Conservative)

Area
  - Total: 27.63 km^{2} (10.67 sq mi)
- Elevation: 250 m (820 ft)

Population (2021)
  - Total: 2,302
  - Density: 83.3/km^{2} (216/sq mi)
- Time zone: UTC−07:00 (PT)
- Postal code span: V0K 1V0
- Area codes: 250, 778, 236, & 672
- Highways: Highway 99; Highway 12
- Waterways: Fraser River, Seton River, Cayoosh Creek,
- Website: Official website

Lillooet (English: /ˈlɪləwɛt/) is a district municipality in the Squamish-Lillooet region of southwestern British Columbia. The town is on the west shore of the Fraser River immediately north of the Seton River mouth. On BC Highway 99, the locality is by road about 100 kilometres (62 mi) northeast of Pemberton, 64 kilometres (40 mi) northwest of Lytton, and 172 kilometres (107 mi) west of Kamloops.

== First Nations ==
The town is a main population centre of the Stʼatʼimc (Lillooet Nation), who comprise just over 50 per cent of the Lillooet area residents. First Nations communities assert the land is traditional territory, having been continuously inhabited for thousands of years. The confluence of several main streams with the Fraser attracted large seasonal and permanent indigenous populations. Situated in the Lower Fountain, the Bridge River Rapids (Sat' or Setl), which blocked migrating salmon, has remained a popular fishing and fish drying site for centuries. Keatley Creek Archaeological Site, one of the largest ancient pit-house communities in the Pacific Northwest, is one of the many archaeological and heritage sites in the vicinity. Several petroglyph sites have been documented along the Fraser in the vicinity of Lillooet.

== Name origin ==
The Lillooet language name Pap-shil-KWA-KA-meen translates as the 'place where the three rivers meet'. The former European name of Cayoosh Flat alluded to a dead or dying cayuse horse (namely a decrepit specimen) at the river. In 1859, Governor Douglas granted a petition to change the name to Lillooet. The Lil'wat people lived on the Douglas Road, a.k.a. the Lakes Route, which was the main trail from the south. Lillooet, which means 'wild onion', appears on Anderson's 1849 map.

== Roads, ferries and bridges ==
For the fortune seekers of the Fraser Canyon Gold Rush (upper canyon) and the Cariboo Gold Rush, the portage-intensive Douglas Road from the south terminated at Lillooet. Across the Fraser, Parsonville was "Mile 0" of the Old Cariboo Road, which stretched about 339 kilometres (211 mi) northward to Alexandria. Built as a toll road by Gustavus Blin Wright, the first 20 to 30 kilometres of tortuous canyon-brink grade remained little changed until the 1970s. In 1864, the shorter Cariboo Road, which connected Yale to Barkerville via Ashcroft, bypassed Lillooet.

The Fraser was crossed by ferry at Lillooet. Parsonville had faded into obscurity by 1889, when the first bridge at Lillooet opened. Consequently, Lillooet became "Mile 0". The numbered roadhouse names of the Cariboo district became measured from the bend in Main Street commemorated by a cairn erected in 1939. However, when the present bridge was constructed south of the town, these old travel measurements became understated by about two miles.

In 1994, fire destroyed the station bridge over the Seton River. In 2020, a two-lane structure replaced the temporary single lane bridge installed in 1994.

== Mining ==
The section of Main Street north from the cairn was called "the Golden Mile" allegedly to reflect gold dust scattered on the ground but indisputably as a supply hub fueled by the goldrush traffic.

West of Lillooet, the Golden Cache Mine on Cayoosh Creek, was staked in 1895. However, promising expectations proved illusive, which ended further investment. The associated prospecting boom ceased by 1900, when mining activity relocated to the Klondike.

Other gold prospecting in the area included underground hard-rock mining in the Bridge River Country, which began in the 1880s and 1890s, but peaked from the 1930s to the 1950s. Gold Bridge and Bralorne were mining centres. Prospecting for gold continues and to a lesser extent for copper, silver and nephrite jade. Until the discovery of larger jade deposits near Cassiar, the Lillooet area was the world's largest source of the nephrite form.

In the 1950s, local farmer and teacher Ron Purvis adapted the skil-saw concept to create a diamond rotary blade. The blade could safely cut the immovable jade boulders which line the banks and beds of the Fraser and Bridge rivers, whereas blasting would have shattered the rock. Although local stores sell polished jade souvenirs, major commercial jade operations no longer exist in the Lillooet area.

== Railway ==
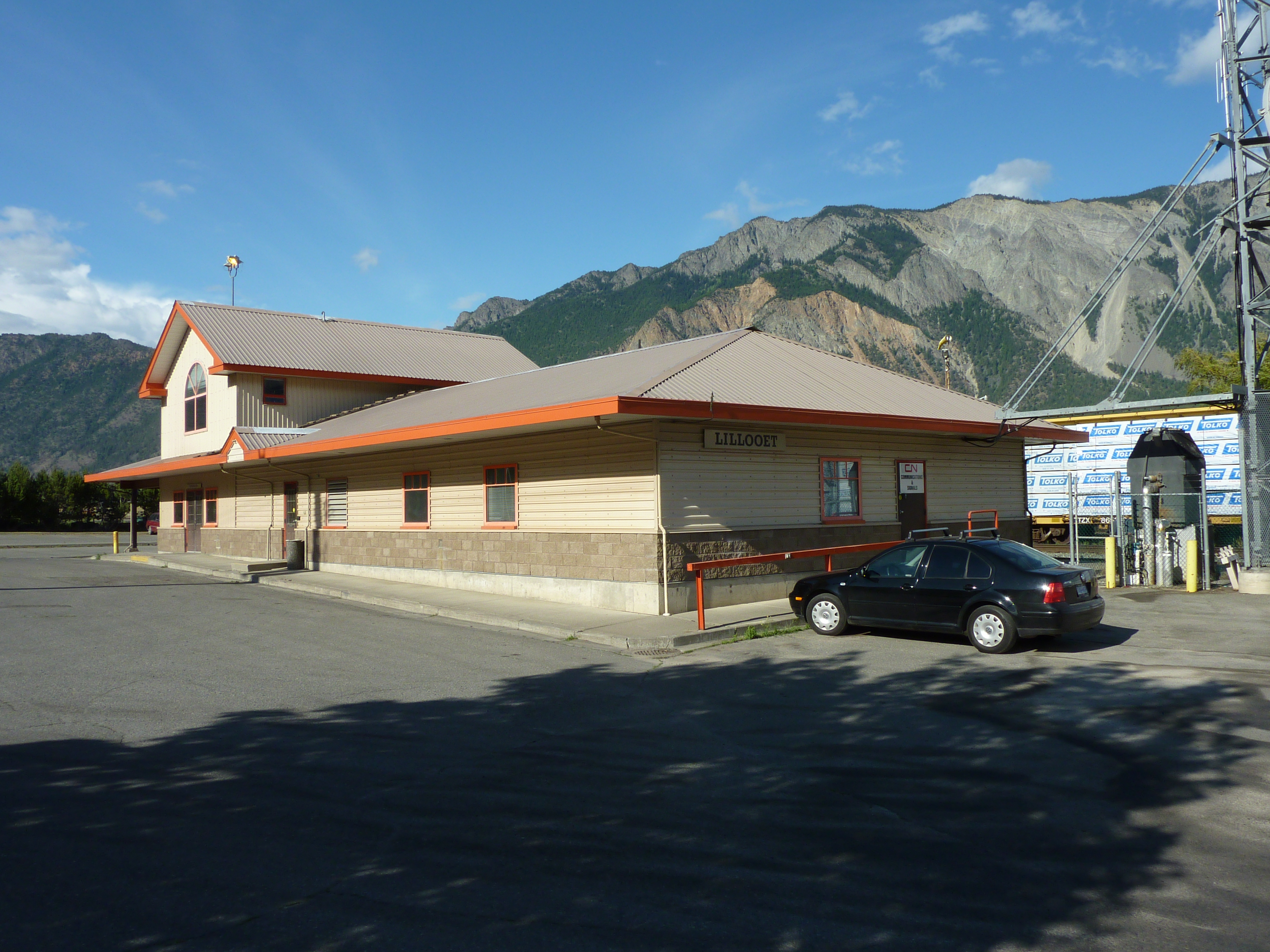
Lillooet railway station, 2011

The northward advance of the Pacific Great Eastern Railway (PGE) rail head reached the head of Seton Lake in January 1915 and the Lillooet locality the following month. PGE built a depot between the Seton River and Cayoosh Creek. That month, the first passenger train arrived, triggering a revival for the isolated town, since a railway could ship agricultural produce. By year end, the track reached Clinton, an additional 72 kilometres (45 mi).

To benefit the railway rather than land speculators, PGE had bypassed the downtown by crossing the Fraser south of the Seton River on the Lillooet railway bridge. PGE erected a station and four-stall roundhouse at East Lillooet, which was a divisional point. The initial depot, called Lillooet station, was 2.4-kilometre (1.5 mi) westward across the Fraser.

In 1930, PGE built the 8.9-kilometre (5.5 mi) Lillooet Diversion from the head of Seton Lake, through the downtown, and north to the Polley bridge. In 1931, PGE completed the bridge, built a new two-storey station downtown, and dismantled and reassembled the roundhouse nearby. The latter was demolished during the early 1970s. The Lillooet station building, which was replaced in 1986, was 4.8 kilometres (3.0 mi) east of Craig (14.3 kilometres (8.9 mi) east of Retakit after Craig closed) and 4.3 kilometres (2.7 mi) south of Polley (12.4 kilometres (7.7 mi) south of Fountain after Polley closed).

The withdrawal of the Cariboo Prospector passenger train in October 2002 ended through service. Canadian National Railway freight trains on break and the Kaoham Shuttle still use the station.

Current services at Lillooet
Preceding station	Tsal'alh Seton Train	Following station
Ohin toward Seton Portage	Tsal'alh Seton Train	Terminus
Ohin toward Seton Portage	Tsal'alh Seton Train via roadway	Lillooet Secondary School School days only Terminus
Ohin toward Seton Portage	Tsal'alh Seton Train Terminus	Save-On-Foods PM trip only toward Lillooet
Former services
Preceding station	Canadian National Railway	Following station
Shalalth toward Seton Portage	Kaoham Shuttle	Terminus
Preceding station	BC Rail	Following station
Craig Lodge toward North Vancouver	Main line	Glen Fraser toward Prince George
Shalalth toward North Vancouver	Cariboo Prospector	Terminus
Shalalth toward North Vancouver	Cariboo Prospector (limited service)	Fountain toward Prince George

== Early community ==
The town began as a goldrush centre in the late 1850s, booming during the progression of discoveries on the Fraser and in the Cariboo in the early 1860s. The title of "the largest town west of Chicago and north of San Francisco" moved in rapid succession from Yale to Lillooet, and then to Barkerville. Just after this gold rush, the town's layout was surveyed by the Royal Engineers.

In 1860, the population was 4,000–5,000. About that time, Richard Hoey was granted 16 hectares (40 acres) on the Texas Creek Road. St. Mary the Virgin Anglican church was built in 1861 and a school established in 1863. That year, the hotels and shops served a population of about 1,600. The Stage Hotel (1860) was considered first class. The Pioneer Hotel (1862) became the Excelsior in the early 1900s. Further lodgings were the International Hotel (1866) and Victoria Hotel (1892).

In 1864, Joseph Watkinson, Thomas Harris, F.W. Foster, and Richard Hoey built the first flour mill. In 1896, St. Andrews Presbyterian church was erected. In 1904, the town was surveyed.

The 1930 fire destroyed the Excelsior, Hurley's Grocery, a movie theatre and the government liquor store. In 1946, the settlement incorporated as a village municipality. In 1948, fire destroyed the Log Cabin Theatre, an 1860s livery barn that had been remodelled into theatre in 1934.

Booms occurred during local gold mining activity, and in the 1940s and 50s during the construction of the Bridge River Power Project. In 1996, the town re-incorporated as a district municipality.

== Forestry and agriculture ==
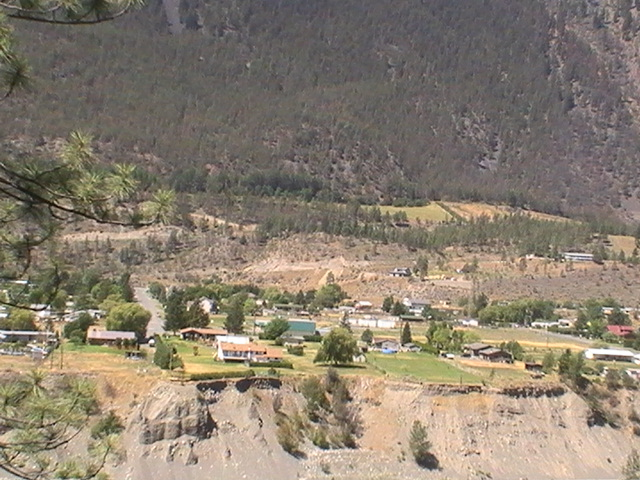
The Hop Farm neighbourhood.

The economy was historically based upon logging, the railway, ranching, farming, and government services. The long growing season has favoured orchards, and in recent times, ginseng. Once, hop and tobacco crops supported the former local beer, cigar and chewing tobacco industries. The town has relied upon forestry since the mid-1970s.

In the 1940s, an Italian named Savona planted vines in the Fountain area. Established in 2009, the Fort Berens Winery in East Lillooet was the first attempt at commercial viticulture. Visitors can taste the award-winning wines. The Cliff & George Vineyards, about 20 kilometres (12 mi) south on the west side of the Fraser, offers a similar opportunity as well as picnic areas on the historic Texas Creek Ranch near Texas Creek.

== Japanese internment camps ==
Four internment camps existed in the Lillooet area during World War II, following the removal of Japanese Canadians from the British Columbia Coast in 1942. Each were "self-support" sites, where family groups who had the financial means could remain together, but the locations were more isolated than the camps in the Kootenays. Since internees were not permitted to return to the coast until 1949, many families permanently settled in Lillooet. The largest camp was East Lillooet, housing 309 people. The other nearby camps were at Shalalth, Minto Mine, and McGillvray Falls.

== Later community ==
Census population: Lillooet
Year	Pop.	±%
1951	469	—
1956	1,083	+130.9%
1961	1,304	+20.4%
1966	1,379	+5.8%
1971	1,514	+9.8%
1976	2,218	+46.5%
1981	1,725	−22.2%
1986	1,758	+1.9%
1991	1,782	+1.4%
1996*	1,988	+11.6%
2001	2,741	+37.9%
2006	2,324	−15.2%
2011	2,322	−0.1%
2016	2,275	−2.0%
2021	2,302	+1.2%
Source: Statistics Canada * Boundary change for 2001 would have adjusted 1996 to 2,886

The town includes infrastructure typical for its size.

In 2009, the district developed a community plan. In 2013, the water treatment plant received a $5.6 million upgrade. In 2019, Tourism Lillooet released a strategic plan. In 2022, an electric vehicle fast charging station opened.

Police, fire, and ambulance, respectively operate emergency service bases. The Lillooet Hospital & Health Centre is a Level 1 Community Hospital which includes 24-hour emergency services. The district owns and operates the Lillooet Airport.

== Demographics ==
In the 2021 Census of Population conducted by Statistics Canada, Lillooet had a population of 2,302 living in 1,111 of its 1,214 total private dwellings, a change of 1.2% from its 2016 population of 2,275. With a land area of 27.63 km^{2} (10.67 sq mi), it had a population density of 83.3/km^{2} (215.8/sq mi) in 2021.

Lillooet's larger regional population includes that of the three large bands of the St'at'imc or Lillooet Nation whose reserves abut the town on all sides, and another three large reserves within 20 miles (32 km); 430 of the District of Lillooet's population are aboriginal. Historical populations have included large numbers of Americans and Chinese, although there are few of either today (although many longtime local families, First Nations and non-First Nations, have some bloodlines from both). The town's non-native population has been historically multi-ethnic in extraction, with a relatively high-rate of intermarriage between all groups.

=== Religion ===
According to the 2021 census, religious groups in Lillooet included:

- Irreligion (1,490 persons or 65.5%)
- Christianity (735 persons or 32.3%)
- Other (25 persons or 1.1%)

Religious groups in Lillooet (1991−2021)
Religious group	2021		2011		2001		1991	
Religious group	Pop.	%	Pop.	%	Pop.	%	Pop.	%
Christian	735	32.31%	770	33.92%	1,340	49.26%	1,035	59.14%
Indigenous spirituality	0	0%	30	1.32%	N/A	N/A	N/A	N/A
Sikh	0	0%	0	0%	65	2.39%	105	6%
Muslim	0	0%	0	0%	45	1.65%	25	1.43%
Buddhist	0	0%	0	0%	20	0.74%	10	0.57%
Jewish	0	0%	0	0%	0	0%	10	0.57%
Hindu	0	0%	0	0%	0	0%	0	0%
Other religion	25	1.1%	0	0%	15	0.55%	20	1.14%
Irreligious	1,490	65.49%	1,440	63.44%	1,235	45.4%	540	30.86%
Total responses	2,275	98.83%	2,270	97.76%	2,720	99.23%	1,750	98.2%

== Education ==
Lillooet has one high school, Lillooet Secondary, which also serves students from neighbouring rural localities such as Shalalth, Seton Portage, Gold Bridge and Bralorne, although those communities do offer students a secondary school program. Cayoosh Elementary School is in the Cayoosh Heights subdivision and George M. Murray Elementary serves North Lillooet. The Upper St'at'imc Culture, Language and Education Society (USCLES) operates education programs, but most St'at'imc children attend the public school system. Post-secondary programs are offered at a Thompson Rivers University campus. The Fountainview Academy, about 24 kilometres (15 mi) south, is an international private school, which offers work-study experience that includes organic farming.

== Notable people ==
- Johnder Basran, first Indo-Canadian mayor in Canada
- Alexander E.B. Davie, member of the Legislative Assembly for Lillooet and 8th Premier of British Columbia
- Don Dickinson, Canadian writer and teacher
- A.C. Elliott, magistrate in Lillooet and 4th Premier of British Columbia
- George Leach, actor and Juno award-winning songwriter/guitarist
- Bertha Hosang Mah, first Chinese woman to graduate from a Canadian university (McGill, 1917); born in Lillooet
- Masajiro Miyazaki, Japanese-Canadian internee and town coroner during WWII, founder of the local ambulance and hospital, Order of Canada awardee
- George Murray, MLA and publisher of the 'Bridge River-Lillooet News'
- Margaret Lally "Ma" Murray, editor of the Bridge River-Lillooet News, Order of Canada awardee
- Caspar Phair, Lillooet pioneer, Gold Commissioner and first Government Agent
- Vernon Pick, prospector; built his fortune in uranium mines and his 'doomsday' mansion just outside of Lillooet

== Climate ==
Lillooet experiences a humid continental/oceanic climate, but it borders on a semi-arid climate (Köppen Cfb/Dfb/BSk).

Situated at an intersection of deep gorges in the lee of the Coast Mountains, it has a dry climate with an average of 349.5 mm (13.76 in) of precipitation being recorded annually. The locality often vies with Lytton and Osoyoos for the title of "Canada's Hot Spot" on a daily basis in summer.

Lillooet holds the record for the fourth-hottest temperature recorded in British Columbia and Canada (behind Lytton, Ashcroft and Kamloops). On 29 June 2021, during the 2021 Western North America heat wave which brought unprecedented heat to the Pacific Northwest, the temperature reached 46.8 °C (116.2 °F). Lillooet also holds the record for the hottest temperature recorded in the province during the months of April (36.1 °C [97.0 °F]) and May (41.7 °C [107.1 °F]). The coldest temperature recorded was measured at the airport during a November cold snap in 1985.

With an average annual snowfall of 26.5 cm (10.4 in), Lillooet is the least snowy place in the BC Interior.

Climate data for Lillooet (1981–2010)
Month	Jan	Feb	Mar	Apr	May	Jun	Jul	Aug	Sep	Oct	Nov	Dec	Year
Record high °C (°F)	18.5 (65.3)	17.8 (64.0)	25.6 (78.1)	36.1 (97.0)	41.7 (107.1)	46.8 (116.2)	44.4 (111.9)	40.5 (104.9)	38.8 (101.8)	30.0 (86.0)	23.3 (73.9)	22.2 (72.0)	46.8 (116.2)
Mean daily maximum °C (°F)	0.6 (33.1)	4.4 (39.9)	10.9 (51.6)	16.2 (61.2)	21.2 (70.2)	24.9 (76.8)	28.3 (82.9)	28.2 (82.8)	22.3 (72.1)	13.5 (56.3)	5.0 (41.0)	0.0 (32.0)	14.6 (58.3)
Daily mean °C (°F)	−2.4 (27.7)	0.4 (32.7)	5.2 (41.4)	9.9 (49.8)	14.8 (58.6)	18.6 (65.5)	21.6 (70.9)	21.3 (70.3)	15.9 (60.6)	8.8 (47.8)	2.1 (35.8)	−2.4 (27.7)	9.5 (49.1)
Mean daily minimum °C (°F)	−5.2 (22.6)	−3.7 (25.3)	−0.4 (31.3)	3.6 (38.5)	8.3 (46.9)	12.3 (54.1)	14.6 (58.3)	14.2 (57.6)	9.4 (48.9)	4.1 (39.4)	−0.9 (30.4)	−4.9 (23.2)	4.3 (39.7)
Record low °C (°F)	−31.1 (−24.0)	−27.0 (−16.6)	−18.3 (−0.9)	−11.1 (12.0)	−3.9 (25.0)	2.8 (37.0)	4.4 (39.9)	4.4 (39.9)	−2.8 (27.0)	−17.0 (1.4)	−32.0 (−25.6)	−31.1 (−24.0)	−32.0 (−25.6)
Average precipitation mm (inches)	38.3 (1.51)	20.3 (0.80)	16.8 (0.66)	19.0 (0.75)	26.1 (1.03)	23.7 (0.93)	35.5 (1.40)	25.7 (1.01)	23.7 (0.93)	33.8 (1.33)	44.6 (1.76)	41.7 (1.64)	349.0 (13.74)
Average rainfall mm (inches)	30.9 (1.22)	17.1 (0.67)	15.2 (0.60)	19.0 (0.75)	26.1 (1.03)	23.7 (0.93)	35.5 (1.40)	25.7 (1.01)	23.7 (0.93)	33.2 (1.31)	40.6 (1.60)	31.9 (1.26)	322.5 (12.70)
Average snowfall cm (inches)	7.5 (3.0)	3.3 (1.3)	1.6 (0.6)	0.05 (0.02)	0.0 (0.0)	0.0 (0.0)	0.0 (0.0)	0.0 (0.0)	0.0 (0.0)	0.7 (0.3)	3.8 (1.5)	9.7 (3.8)	26.5 (10.4)
Average precipitation days (≥ 0.2 mm)	9.7	7.7	9.1	8.0	8.5	7.5	7.9	6.7	6.5	10.7	13.0	10.2	105.1
Average rainy days (≥ 0.2 mm)	7.4	6.5	8.1	8.0	8.5	7.5	7.9	6.7	6.5	10.6	12.0	7.2	97.3
Average snowy days (≥ 0.2 cm)	3.4	1.5	0.5	0.05	0.0	0.0	0.0	0.0	0.0	0.2	1.7	3.6	10.9
Source: Environment Canada
