= Seton Lake =

Lake in British Columbia, Canada

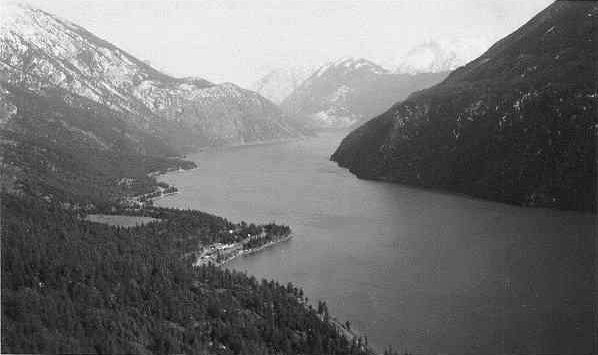
- Seton Lake from Mission Mountain, c. 1950 Shalalth and Ohin on points at left. Looking west toward Mount Brew and Lillooet

- Location within British Columbia

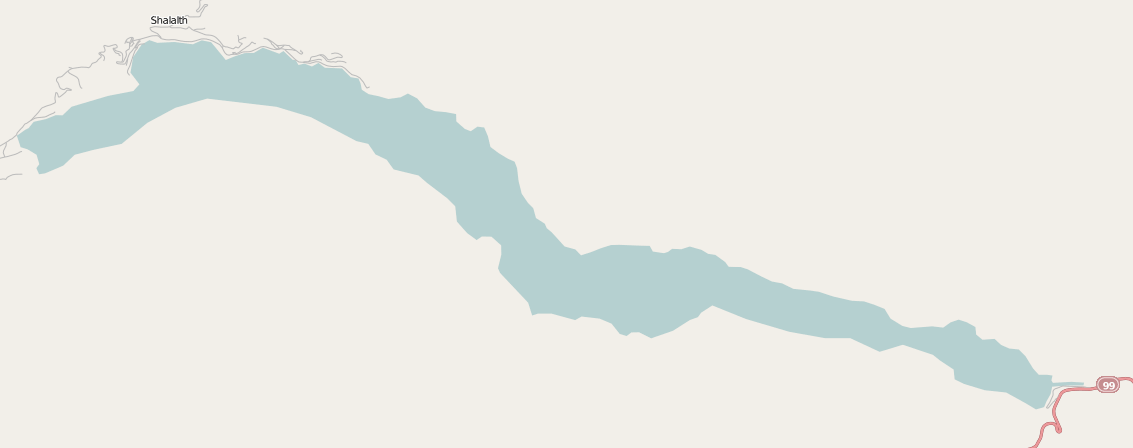
- Location: British Columbia
- Coordinates: 50°41′16″N 122°07′35″W
- Type: natural lake
- Primary inflows: glacial feed and Cayoosh Creek from hydro overflow and Carpenter Lake Reservoir.
- Primary outflows: Seton River
- Basin countries: Canada
- Max. length: 21.9 km (13.6 mi)
- Max. width: 1.1 km (0.68 mi)
- Surface area: 24.6 km^{2} (9.5 sq mi)
- Average depth: 85 m (279 ft)
- Max. depth: 151 m (495 ft)
- Water volume: 2.091 km^{3} (0.502 cu mi)
- Surface elevation: 243 m (797 ft)

Seton Lake is a lake in the Squamish-Lillooet region of southwestern British Columbia. On the northeast side is Mission Ridge. On the southwest is the Cayoosh Range. By road, the eastern end is about 7 kilometres (4.3 mi) southwest of Lillooet.

== Name origin ==
In 1827, Francis Ermatinger of the Hudson's Bay Company (HBC), the first European explorer, referred to the Seton and Anderson lakes as the first and second Peseline Lake (various spellings). In 1846, Alexander Caulfield Anderson paddled along the lakes when seeking a new HBC fur brigade route from Fort Alexandria. In 1858, Governor James Douglas commissioned Anderson to establish a route to the goldfields during the Fraser Canyon Gold Rush. The governor encouraged Anderson to name the lakes after his family. Anderson's cousin Colonel Alexander Seton of the 74th Regiment, who was in command of the troops on board HMS Birkenhead, which sank in 1852, was noted for his exemplary conduct in the moment and was among those who drowned.

The misspelling as "Seaton Lake" on Jorgensen's 1895 map was commonly repeated for decades in both newspaper accounts and government reports.

== Dimensions and tributaries ==
The lake is 21.9 kilometres (13.6 mi) long and averages 1.1 kilometres (0.7 mi) wide. The surface area is 24.6 square kilometres (9.5 sq mi). The mean depth is 85 metres (279 ft) and maximum depth is 151 metres (495 ft). The lake has not completely frozen in recent decades but has in the past. The water is a few degrees colder than Anderson Lake.

The primary inflow (western end) and outflow (eastern end) are the Seton River. Clockwise, the main tributaries are Omin Brook, Carpenter Lake (via Mission Ridge tunnels), Tsee Creek, Ohin Creek, Olin Creek, Ptilla Creek, Puck Creek, Duguid Creek, Madelina Creek, and Audrey Creek, on the northern shore, and Machute Creek on the southern shore.

In 1979, a creek was partially diverted to mix creek water with powerhouse water, so that sockeye salmon would not lose their bearings, but instead proceed upstream to their traditional spawning grounds.

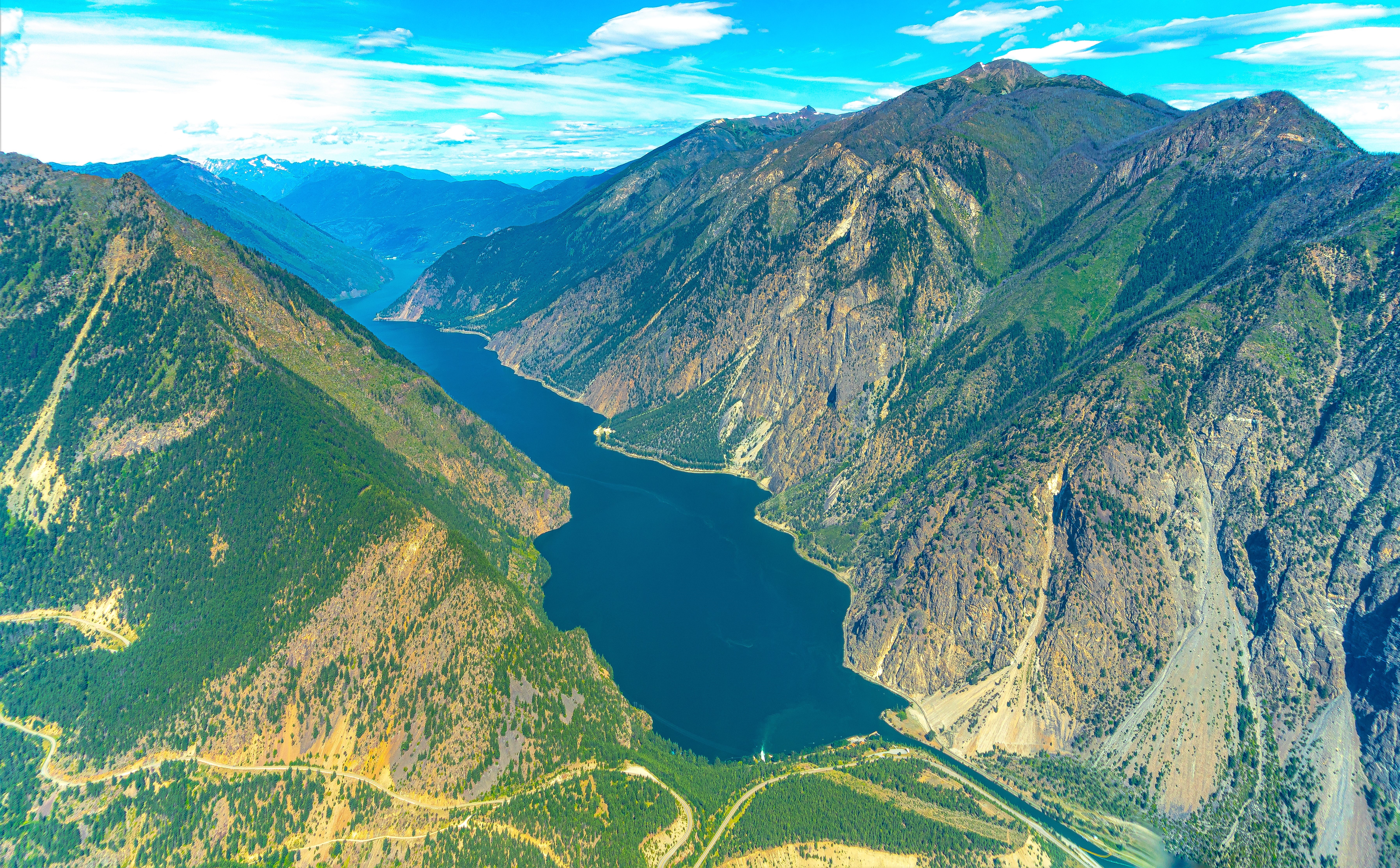
View westward of Seton Lake with Mount McLean (right)

== Environment ==
The lake is bounded by snow-capped mountains that descend abruptly to the shores. Environmental conditions largely mirror the Anderson Lake geology, topography, and climate. However, glacial silt from Cayoosh Creek, entering via the power station tunnel, makes the lake water much cloudier than Anderson.

== Ferries ==
=== 1858–c.1864 ===
Although a trail existed along the north shore, this section of the Douglas Road was mostly travelled via the lake, initially by canoe. Despite repairs and upgrades to this rudimentary trail over the years, the condition remained as unsuitable for livestock passage.

Built on the lake for Taylor & Co, the 34-metre (110 ft) paddle steamer Champion entered service in June 1860. Assumedly, this was the vessel that qualified for the $150 government grant. However, John Colbraith and John Taylor focussed on their hotel at the end of lake, leaving the day-to-day operations of the ferry to Flynn and Kelly.

In 1862, the Short Portage–Lillooet steamer fare was $1. The next year, Taylor & Co, introduced faster paddle steamers, which were the 30-metre (100 ft) Seaton and the 34-metre (110 ft) Prince Alfred.

The fate of these vessels is unclear, but the remains of the Seaton were still visible on the lakeshore in 1901.

=== Intermediate years ===
First Nations provided an informal canoe service.

=== c.1898–1934 ===
An influx of gold prospectors, which overwhelmed the private boats and barges, highlighted the need for regular lake transportation. In February 1899, the 12-metre (40 ft) steamboat Minnehaha entered service but was destroyed in a violent storm in 1902.

A new steamer was completed in September 1900. The owners built wharves at the foot of the lake and Shalalth. The vessel was likely the 15-metre (50 ft) Britannia, which dominated the lake service after 1902. Its final year on the run to Mission (Shalalth) and Short Portage (Seton Portage) was 1914. In May 1912, the 9.1-metre (30 ft) gasoline engine Durban was launched for the same route. That year, the railway contractor made a daily round trip with its gasoline tug and scow. In total, one steamer and two or three gasoline launches carried freight and passengers on the lake that year. The Seton Lake Steamboat Co operated at least until November 1916, apparently with gasoline boats in later years. That summer, Capt. E.W. Cox, who operated a launch on the lake and was about to receive an operating subsidy, drowned while repairing a wharf.

Ernie Marshall and his brother operated a Lillooet–Shalalth ferry until 1934.

== Railway ==
By late 1912, seven construction camps had been established along Seton and Anderson Lakes. The next summer, a falling rock killed a worker.

The northward advance of the Pacific Great Eastern Railway (PGE) rail head reached the western end of Seton Lake in late January 1915 and the Lillooet vicinity in mid-February.

In 1916, high water extensively damaged the track.

The stations along the north side of the lake have been as follows:

Train Timetables (Regular stop or Flag stop)
	Mile	1923	1936	1943	1950	1959	1969	1978	1986	1996	2002
Seton	138.0		Regular	Regular	Regular	Flag	Flag				
Seton Portage	139.3							Flag	Flag	Flag	Flag
Bridge River	141.4		Regular								
Shalalth ^{a}	142.3	Flag	Regular	Regular	Regular	Regular	Flag	Flag	Flag	Flag	Flag
Retaskit	149.2	Flag	Flag	Flag	Flag	Flag	Flag	Flag			
Craig Lodge ^{b}	154.6		Flag		Flag						

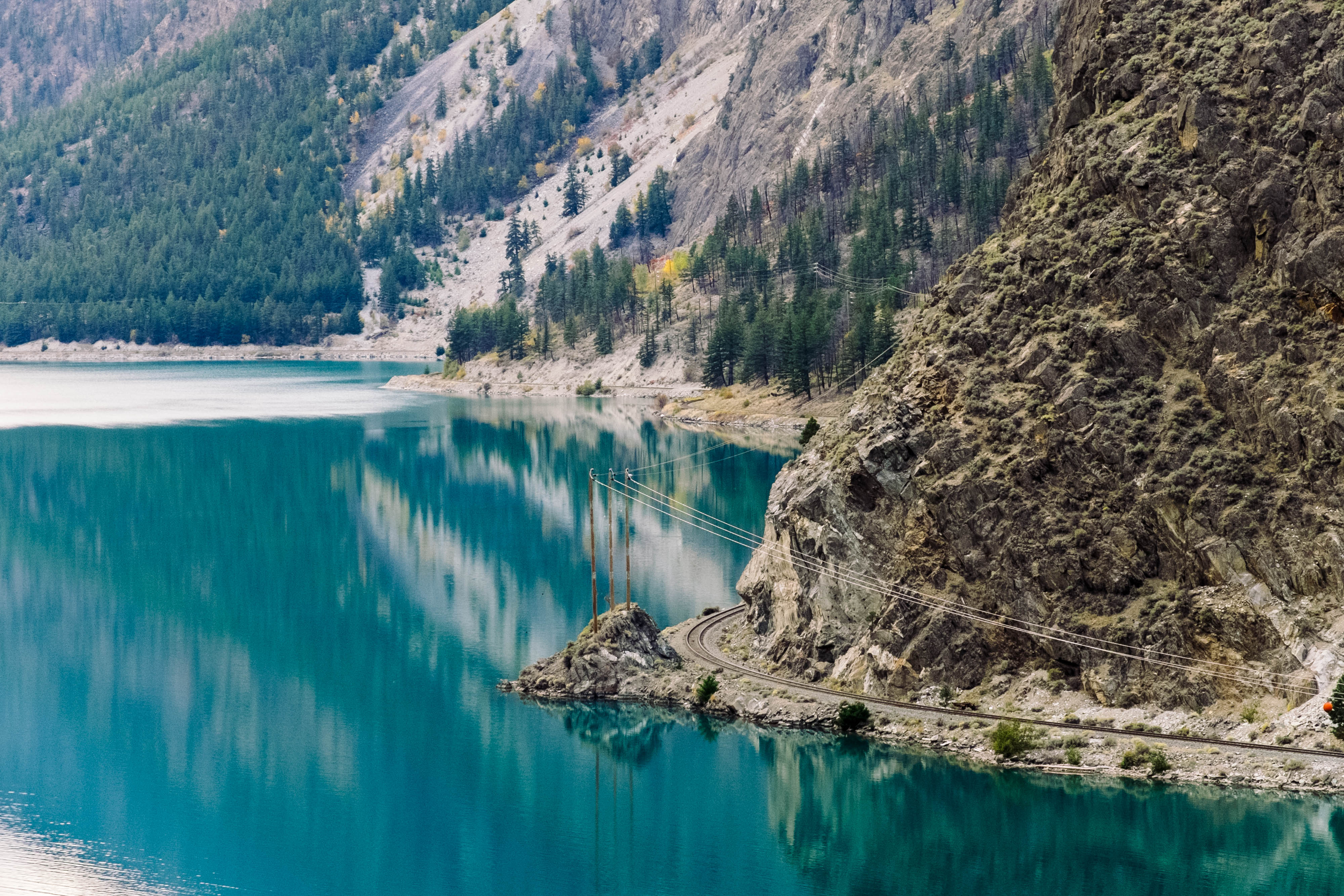
View westward of the railway beside Seton Lake, 2017.

^a. Formerly known as the Mission, an unofficial flag stop existed by 1918.
^b. The station may have been an unofficial flag stop by 1916 but was definitely one by 1921.

The shuttle along the lake, which commenced as Lillooet–Shalalth in 1934 and became Lillooet–Seton Portage in 1958, would stop most anywhere on request. The service became the Kaoham Shuttle in 2002.

In 1949, the construction of concrete walls eliminated five bridges along the lake.

In January 1950, an avalanche rushing down the mountainside forced a locomotive and tender into the icy lake. The engineer and fireman drowned inside the locomotive, which came to rest 27 metres (90 ft) below the surface.

In December 1964, a diesel locomotive hauling a freight train struck a rockslide on the track, derailed, and plunged into the icy lake. The engineer drowned, but two other crew swam to safety. The locomotive, which rested on a ledge 43 metres (140 ft) underwater, was secured a month later to prevent it from slipping to the bottom of the lake. The PGE implemented a coroner's jury recommendation that a speeder precede all trains along the lake to check for track obstructions. In June 1965, the 120-ton locomotive was raised.

In December 1969, two locomotives and 13 cars of a 77-car freight train derailed. One car rolled into the lake and another caught fire.

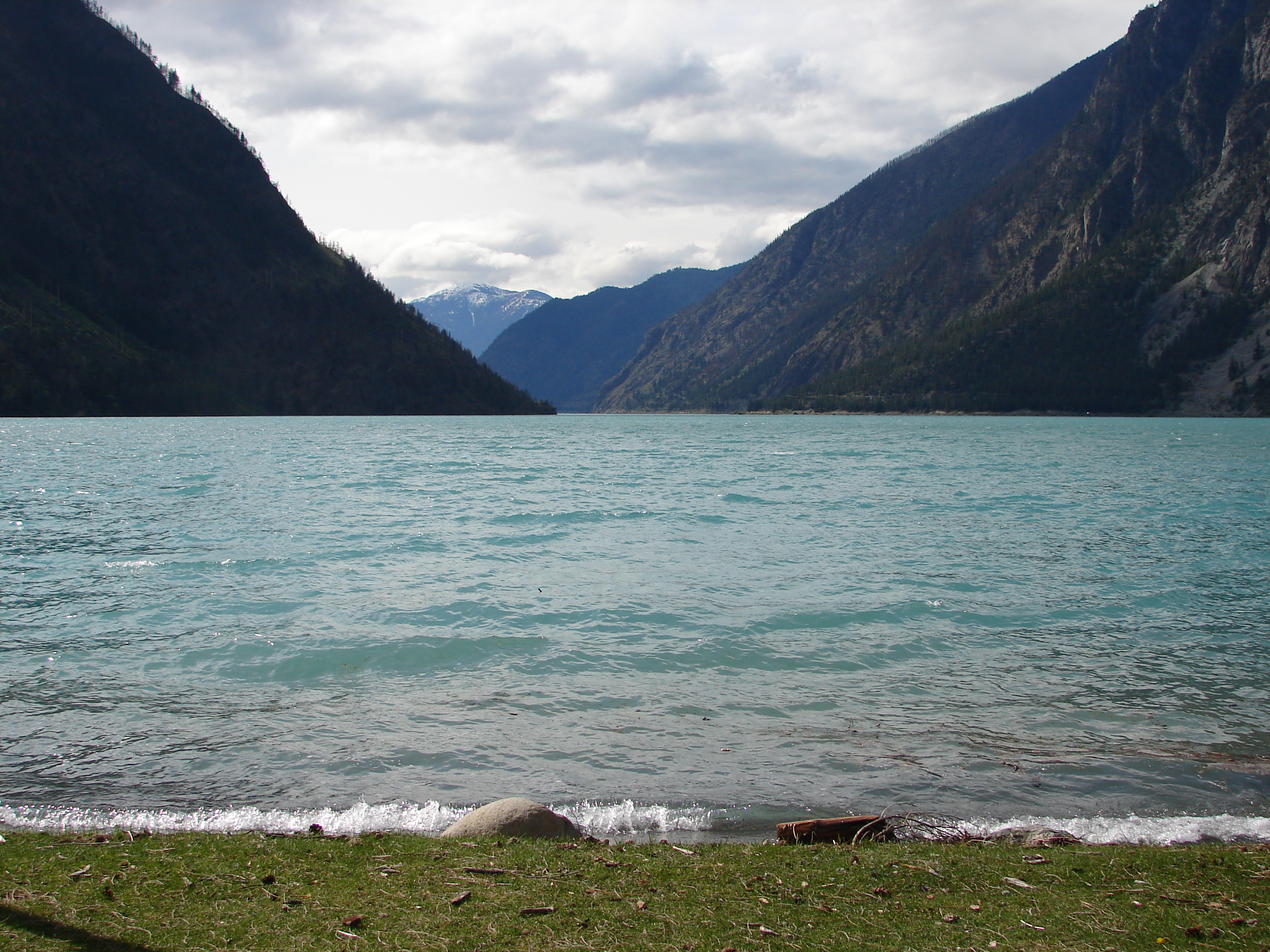
View westward from Seton Lake beach, 2011.

In February 1980, a large rock fell upon the track after the speeder passed. On rounding a bend, a southbound 59-car freight train struck the rock, derailing the two lead locomotives and two cars. The locomotives tumbled into the lake, where one crew member swam free but one drowned. In May 1981, BC Rail raised and restored one locomotive. In April 1989, a private citizen raised the second locomotive, but BC Rail expressed no interest in it.

Canadian National Railways have operated the BC Rail line since 2004.

== Recreation ==
The one-kilometre return Seton Lake Viewpoint hike offers the lake and mountains as a background and the switchback highway as a foreground. The Upper Bench Loop Trail provides views of Cayoosh Creek, the valley, and Seton Powerhouse. The short trail down to the lake offers lake views. The stoney Seton Lake beach has a boat launch, dock, and several picnic tables. Fishing is better in the creeks and river than the lake.

== Maps ==
- "BC map". www.davidrumsey.com. 1925.
- "Shell BC map". www.davidrumsey.com. 1956.

== See also ==
- List of lakes of British Columbia
- Vessels of the Lakes Route
