= Churn Creek =

Watercourse in British Columbia, Canada

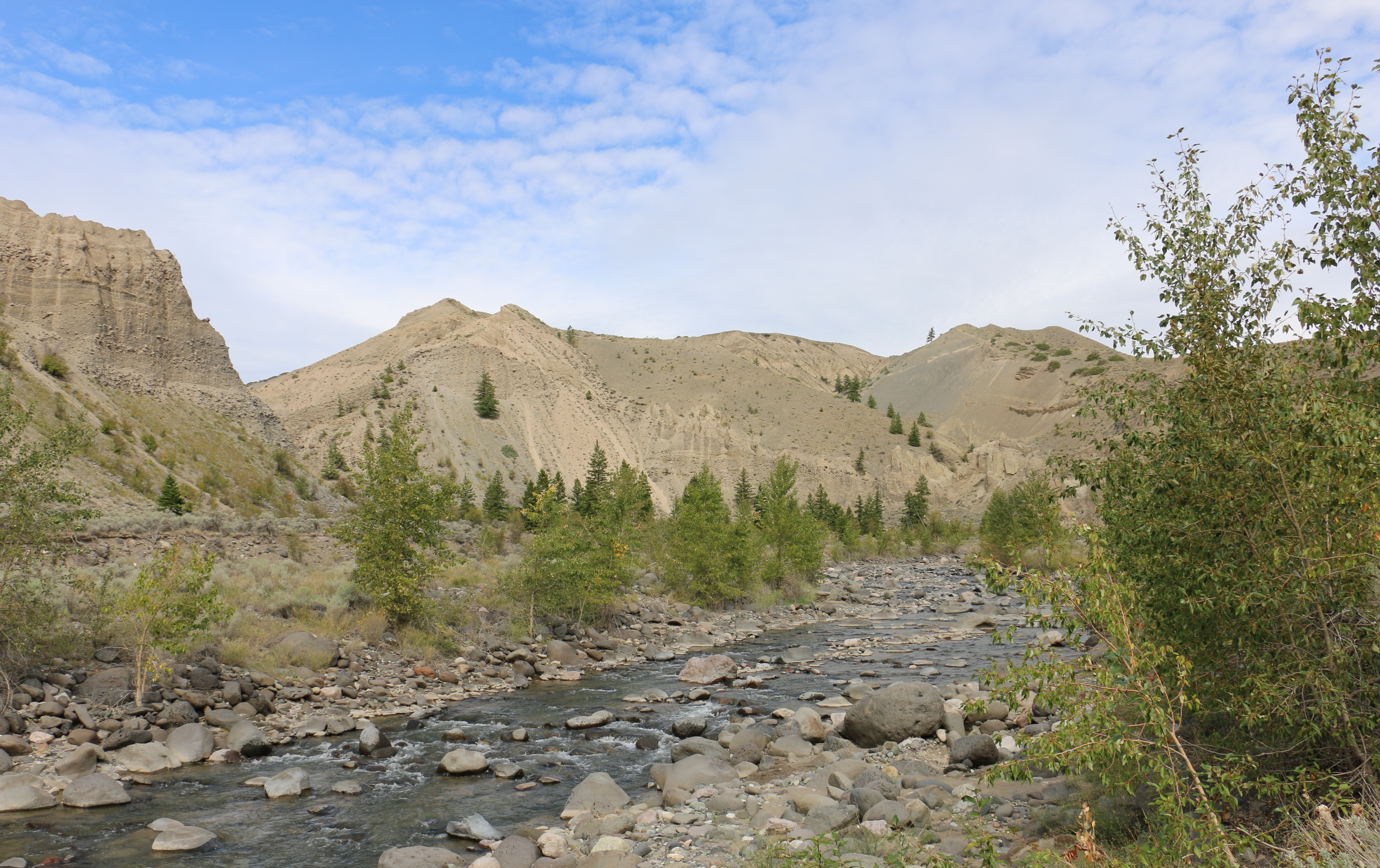
Churn Creek, near its mouth on the Fraser River

Churn Creek is a tributary of the Fraser River in the Canadian province of British Columbia.

== Course ==
Churn Creek flows generally north before turning northeast on its final leg through grasslands, joining the Fraser River just south of the headquarters of the Gang Ranch and opposite the community of Dog Creek and associated creek. Most of its lower course is a heavily-eroded canyon lined by benchlands, and is protected in Churn Creek Protected Area, which also includes the ecological preserve of the Empire Valley Ranch.

Its source at approximately 51°05.7′N 122°36.3′W is at two subalpine lakes (one of which is called Horse Lake) on the northeastern shoulder of Big Dog Mountain, the northernmost major summit of the Shulaps Range, and flowing north and northwesterly until reaching the southern skirt of Poison Mountain, a northeastern outpost of the Camelsfoot Range, where it continues northwesterly, forming a divide with a small upper tributary of the Yalakom River, the main north fork of the Bridge River which divides those two ranges. From there it proceeds northwest, falling steeply from the high plateau between those two ranges, joining at the bottom of that grade with an unnamed creek from Swartz (Fish) Lake, one a chain of lakes in the area of the Mud Lakes Pass, at the divide with the basin of Tyaughton Creek, also a tributary of the Bridge River. From there it turns north in its main trajectory, forming the northwestern flank of the northern Camelsfoot Range. It is joined in its upper reaches by its two main left tributaries, Lone Valley Creek and Dash Creek, which drain the southernmost Chilcotin Plateau just north of the edge of the Chilcotin Ranges and the Spruce Lake Protected Area (now known as the South Chilcotin Mountain Park, created in 2010, which consists of a smaller area than the original Protected Area).

== See also ==
- Dash Creek
- Lone Valley Creek
- Big Creek Provincial Park
- Hungry Valley Creek
- List of rivers of British Columbia
