= Haylmore =

Coordinates: 50°51′00″N 122°51′00″W

Haylmore is a location in the Bridge River Country of the southwestern Interior of British Columbia, Canada, located near the town of Gold Bridge just below the confluence of the Bridge River and its south fork, the Hurley River.

== Name ==
Haylmore gets its name from Will Haylmore, the local mining sub-recorder whose office and residence were built on that land, which is a placer claim which he also worked.

== Description ==
The historic place is a 2.6-hectare (6.4-acre) triangle-shaped placer lease, upon which there are two buildings built around 1922–1924, Will Haylmore's grave (1964), extensive terraced rock walls, with two buildings built 1922–1924, a gravesite, and mine workings constructed between 1924 and 1956. The placer lease, called "Haylmore Placer" or "Hurley River" in BC MINFILE records, is recorded to have produced "over 1000 ounces" (over 31,000 grams) of coarse gold. The largest nugget found weighed in at 404 grams, but more common were 31 to 150 gram nuggets.

== Heritage site proposal ==
A 2014 study commissioned by the Bridge River Valley Community Association towards a hoped-for designation as a provincial heritage site says:

[The site] has historical value for its associations with the early settlement, growth and gold mining history in the upper Bridge River Valley, the richest mining district in British Columbia during the 1930s-1950s. While there are many historic mining related sites in the area the majority of the structures have been reclaimed by the elements, this historic place remains largely intact with a good level of integrity due to previous stewardship efforts by the Bridge River Valley community.

== See also ==
- Haylmore Creek
