= Wolverine Pass =

Mountain pass in British Columbia, Canada

- Location within British Columbia
- Elevation: 2,218 m (7,277 ft)

Third Approach
- Location: British Columbia, Canada
- Range: Chilcotin Ranges
- Coordinates: 50°58′00″N 123°15′00″W
- Topo map: NTS 92J14 Dickson Range

Wolverine Pass, 2,218 m (7,277 ft), is a mountain pass in the Chilcotin Ranges of the Pacific Ranges, the southernmost major subdivision of the Coast Mountains of British Columbia, Canada. It is located between the headwaters of Gun Creek, a major north tributary of the Bridge River, and those of Slim Creek, which is a tributary of Gun Creek, and is part of the trail system within the Spruce Lake Protected Area (a.k.a. "Southern Chilcotins").

== See also ==
- List of mountain passes
- Tyoax Pass
- Griswold Pass
- Warner Pass
- Elbow Pass
