= Shulaps Range =

Subrange of the Chilcotin Ranges

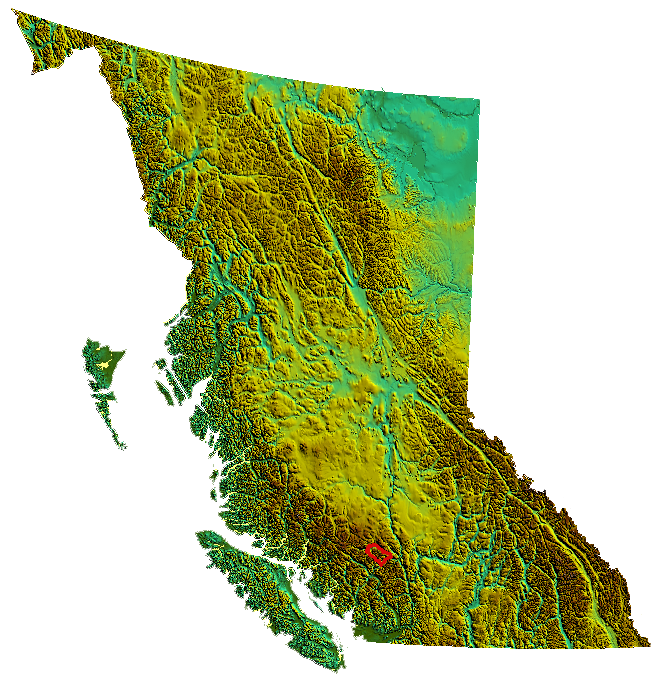
- Location of Shulaps Range

Highest point
- Peak: Shulaps Peak
- Elevation: 2,880 m (9,450 ft)
- Coordinates: 50°56′56.0″N 122°31′01.9″W

Dimensions
- Area: 723 km^{2} (279 mi^{2})

Geography
- Country: Canada
- Region: British Columbia
- Range coordinates: 50°55′N 122°25′W
- Parent range: Chilcotin Ranges

The Shulaps Range is a subrange of the Chilcotin Ranges subset of the Pacific Ranges of the Coast Mountains in southwest-central British Columbia. The range is 55 km NW–SE and 15 km SW–NE and 2,970 km^{2} (1,150 sq mi) in area.

The range is fairly high in elevation, with dryland-type summits with some very small icefields. Its highest summits are Shulaps Peak 2,880 m (9,450 ft) and Big Dog Mountain 2,862 m (9,390 ft). Another prominent summit is Rex Peak 2,684 m (8,806 ft), a conical mass dominating the southern end of the range, which is delimited by the buttress-wall of the Bridge River Canyon.

== Terrain and location ==
The Shulaps' northeast flank is a series of high basins. Many contain alpine lakes and which allow for road access to high up in various parts of the range. There is an active gold claim on the south flank of Big Dog Mountain in the basin of Blue Creek in the northwestern part of the range and, at the far southeast end high in the basin of Hell Creek, there was once a working jade mine.

Its southeast edge is the west rim of the Big Canyon of the Bridge River, just below which (to the NE) is the confluence of the Bridge and Yalakom Rivers, which is the range's northeastern boundary. West across Tyaughton Creek and upper Churn Creek is the South Chilcotin which is not part of the Chilcotin, but of the Bridge River Country (see Spruce Lake Protected Area (a.k.a. the "South Chilcotin") and Big Creek Provincial Park). To the east, across the Yalakom, is the Camelsfoot Range, to the south the Bendor. Southeast is the town of Lillooet, near the southern tip of the Camelsfoot.

The best view of the Shulaps Range to be had, other than from one of the neighbouring ranges, is from the former site of Minto City at the confluence of Gun Creek and the Bridge River (now Carpenter Lake Reservoir). From there, and along the upper end of Carpenter Lake, the range's west face is a familiar sight to travellers on BC Hwy 40 from Bralorne and Gold Bridge to Lillooet.

== Origin of name ==
The Shulaps name is an anglicized version of the St'̓át'̓imcets word for the ram of the mountain sheep. The Yalakom River is similarly named for ̓the ewe. This was once extremely rich big game country, and the names suggest the good hunting in this range (the Yalakom valley and the Shulaps Range were shared hunting territory between the St'át'imc and the Tsilhqot'in).
