= Griswold Pass =

Mountain pass in British Columbia, Canada

- Location within British Columbia

Location
- Location: British Columbia, Canada
- Range: Pacific Ranges
- Coordinates: 50°59′00″N 123°23′00″W
- Topo map: NTS 92J14 Dickson Range

Griswold Pass is a mountain pass in the Pacific Ranges of the Coast Mountains of British Columbia, located at the head of Nichols Creek, a tributary of the upper Bridge River (S), and the head of Griswold Creek, a tributary of the Lord River (N), which feeds the Taseko Lakes and is effectively a tributary of the Taseko River (which enters those lakes separately). The Nichols Creek area is part of the volcanic formation known as the Bridge River Cones, while to the north of the pass the Taseko Lakes basin is part of Tsy'los Provincial Park.

== See also ==
- List of mountain passes
- Lord Pass
- Warner Pass
- Elbow Pass
- Tyoax Pass
- Grizzly Pass
- Wolverine Pass
- Spruce Lake Protected Area (begins just east of Griswold Pass)
