= Brexton =

Defunct town in British Columbia, Canada

Coordinates: 50°50′08″N 122°49′27″W

Brexton, formerly known as Fish Lake, is a ghost town located in the Bridge River Country region of British Columbia. Although the provincial Gazetteer still lists the "settlement" of Brexton, which was situated between the southeast end of Gun Lake and Gold Bridge, and three and a half miles north of Bralorne, this once busy town has mostly vanished though a few buildings remain. The old town site now sits mainly on private property.

== Access ==
Brexton can be accessed via Highway 40 from Lillooet, or via an upgraded backroad from Pemberton and Whistler known as the Hurley Main, which uses a pass at the head of the Hurley River to access the valley of the upper Lillooet River north of Pemberton.

== History ==
Like most of the communities which developed in this region, Brexton got its start, and its name, from gold mining. In June 1931 the Bridge River Exploration Company was incorporated. Its holdings consisted of 38 claims and fractions on the northeast side of the Hurley River, a tributary of the main branch of the Bridge River.

"This is a showing with considerable possibilities," noted a Department of Mines inspector; "there is every indication of a very large tonnage of ore, and with sufficient values for milling it would develop into a major operation."

Two years later the company reorganized as B. R. X.Gold Mines Limited, E.R. Shepherd managing director. In 1934 camp facilities at the California minesite were enlarged but, by the following year, were insufficient for the 26-man work force, most of whom found private accommodation in the tiny settlement of Fish Lake. In honor of the B.R.X. mines, it was named Brexton and first appeared as such on the maps in 1938. The usual small business establishments catered to the miners and, according to one account, Brexton was a lively town at its peak.

For almost 20 years the B.R.X. Company explored its claims by diamond-drill and tunnel. In 1937 it had converted to electricity; the following year it had built a 100-ton mill. In that year the BRX/ARIZONA claim commenced and but quickly ended, with 425 grams of gold and 28 grams of silver from 4342 tonnes of ore in total coming out before the mine shut down. Another claim, known as "Gloria Kitty", produced 467 grams of gold and 311 grams of silver from 4343 tonnes of ore in the same year.

Initial interest in these and adjoining properties dated back to 1897; operations were suspended in 1946. For all of the investment and unlimited patience, B.R.X. never entered full-scale production. As late as 1951 Brexton had a population of 21.
