= Warner Pass (Chilcotin Ranges) =

Mountain pass in Canada

- Location within British Columbia

Third Approach
- Location: British Columbia, Canada
- Range: Chilcotin Ranges
- Coordinates: 51°03′45″N 123°13′30″W
- Topo map: NTS 92O3 Warner Pass

Warner Pass is a mountain pass in the Chilcotin Ranges subdivision of the Pacific Ranges, the southernmost division of the Coast Mountains of British Columbia, Canada. Located southeast of the Taseko Lakes, it is on the divide between Warner and Denain Creeks, which are in the Bridge River and Taseko River drainage respectively. Therefore it is on the boundary between the Spruce Lake Protected Area and Tsy'los Provincial Park.

== See also ==
- List of mountain passes
- Griswold Pass
- Tyoax Pass
- Wolverine Pass
