= Dog Creek =

Dog Creek may refer to:

Canada

- Dog Creek (Fraser River), a tributary of the Fraser River
  - Dog Creek, British Columbia, a ranching settlement on the Fraser River
  - Canoe Creek Band/Dog Creek Indian Band, a.k.a. the Dog Creek First Nation, a band government in the Dog Creek and Canoe Creek areas of the Cariboo Plateau and Fraser Canyon
      - Dog Creek Indian Reserve No. 1, an Indian Reserve of the Canoe Creek Band/Dog Creek Indian Band to the east of the settlement
      - Dog Creek Indian Reserve No. 2, an Indian Reserve of the Canoe Creek Band/Dog Creek Indian Band to the east of the settlement
      - Dog Creek Indian Reserve No. 3, an Indian Reserve of the Canoe Creek Band/Dog Creek Indian Band to the east of the settlement
      - Dog Creek Indian Reserve No. 4, an Indian Reserve of the Canoe Creek Band/Dog Creek Indian Band to the east of the settlement
  - Dog Creek Dome, a mountain near the settlement
- Dog Creek, Wiliams Lake, a community just south of and part of the City of Williams Lake, British Columbia
- Dog Creek, Fort St. James, a community on the west side of the Stuart River, just south of Fort St. James, British Columbia

United States

- Dog Creek (Osage River), a river in Missouri
- Dog Creek (Missouri River), a creek in Montana in the Judith Landing Historic District
- Dog Creek (Lick Creek), a river in Tennessee
- Dog Creek, Shasta County, California stream flows in to Sacramento River and former town, near Delta
