= Mount Bishop (Camelsfoot Range) =

Mountain in British Columbia, Canada

- Location within British Columbia
- Interactive map of Mount Bishop

Highest point
- Elevation: 1,721 m (5,646 ft)
- Prominence: 231 m (758 ft)
- Coordinates: 50°54′13″N 122°11′26″W

Geography
- Location: British Columbia, Canada
- District: Lillooet Land District
- Topo map: NTS 92J16 Bridge River

Mount Bishop is a mountain in the Camelsfoot Range in the Lillooet Country of the Central Interior of British Columbia. Named for an old settler, it is located four km north of the settlement of Moha, which is at the confluence of the Bridge and Yalakom Rivers.
