= Chilcotin Ranges =

Mountain ranges in British Columbia, Canada

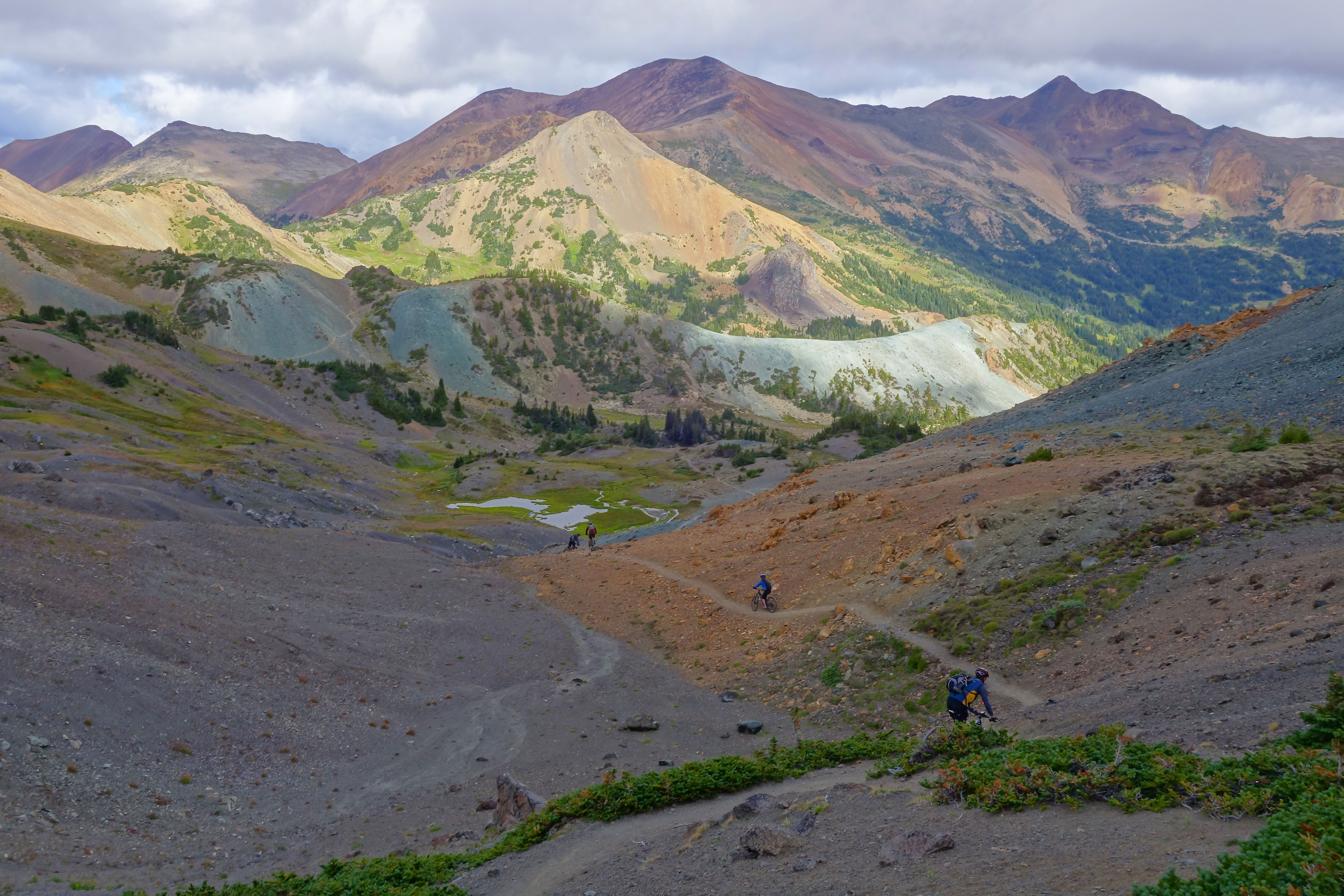
- The Chilcotin Ranges exhibit vibrant colours from heavy mineralization.

Dimensions
- Area: 9,616 km^{2} (3,713 mi^{2})

Geography
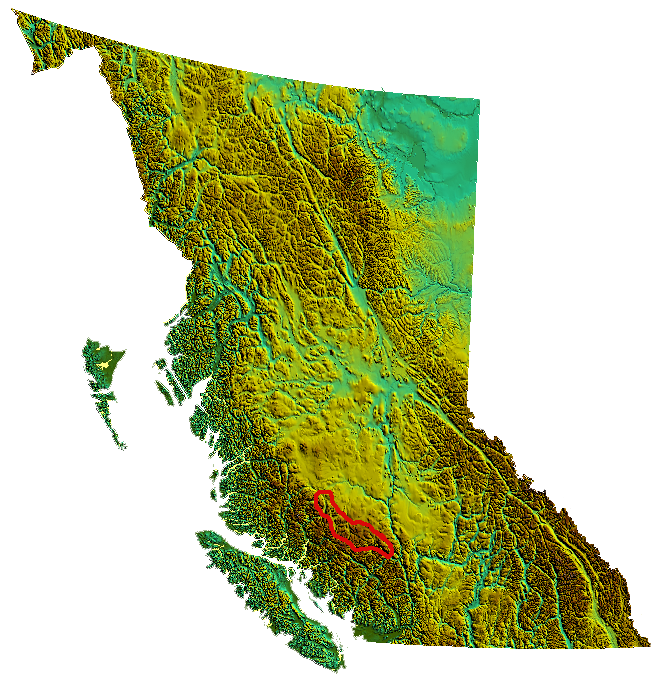
- Chilcotin Ranges as defined in S. Holland Landforms of British Columbia
- Country: Canada
- Province: British Columbia
- Range coordinates: 51°10′0″N 123°15′0″W
- Parent range: Pacific Ranges
- Borders on: Chilcotin Plateau, Waddington Range

The Chilcotin Ranges are a subdivision of the Pacific Ranges of the Coast Mountains (in some classifications they are a separate subdivision). They lie on the inland lea of the Pacific Ranges, abutting the Interior Plateau of British Columbia. Their northwestern end is near the head of the Klinaklini River and their southeast end is the Fraser River just north of Lillooet; their northern flank is the edge of the Plateau while their southern is the north bank of the Bridge River. In some reckonings they do not go all the way to the Fraser but end at the Yalakom River, which is the North Fork of the Bridge.

They are not one range but a collection of ranges, often very distinct from each other. There are three major named subranges:

- Dickson Range
- Shulaps Range
- Camelsfoot Range (assigned to the Interior Plateau in some definitions)

To the west of the western end of the Chilcotin Ranges, and considered by some to be part of the group, are:

- Pantheon Range
- Niut Range

South of which are the Waddington Range and the Homathko Icefield.

== Provincial Parks ==
In recent years major provincial parks and protected areas have been created in the central-eastern part of the Chilcotin Ranges. These are the Big Creek Provincial Park, the Tsʼilʔos Provincial Park (where the '?' is a glottal stop) and Big Creek Provincial Park, and the Spruce Lake Protected Area and Churn Creek Protected Area.

== History of the Spruce Lake Protected Area ==
This region is commonly (but incorrectly) known as the "South Chilcotin" and is the object of a protracted quarrel between preservationist movements and resource extraction proposals since the 1930s. A provincial park was established in the 1990s but was downgraded in 2007 to the Spruce Lake Protected Area. The political status of the area is uncertain and the area preserved is greatly reduced from the original proposals to protect it, which began in the 1930s during the heyday of the Bridge River goldfield towns just to the south.

Historically this region was the hunting territory of Chief Hunter Jack of the Lakes Lillooet, whose big-game hunting business shared the region with hunters of the Tsilhqot'in people. The shared use of the area north of the Bridge River and Gun Creek was part of the settlement of an early-19th-century peace which had ended a long and bloody war between Hunter Jack's people and the Tsilhqot'in. Trails from the Bridge River Country led over the many ranges of the region to Taseko Lake and Chilko Lake in the Chilcotin Country, and also east across the Camelsfoot Range to the Fraser River near Big Bar.

Though no mines have ever been found in the proposed protected area, other than a few marginal ones in the vicinity of Eldorado Mountain, the south flank of Big Dog Mountain at the northwest end of the Shulaps Range was the site of a major gold excitement in 1941, connected with the interests who then owned the Bralorne-Pioneer Mine mines nearby. Physically daunting efforts to reach the alpine-elevation mine site over the Shulaps Range in order to preserve rights to the claim in the allotted time period almost destroyed the large pack-train, but the papers got filed. Those claims were shuffled aside during World War II but remained on the map and are currently under exploitation as the Blue Creek Mine. Other large mine prospects in the area include copper diggings covering the slopes of Red Mountain, the highest in the Camelsfoot Range just north of the Blue Creek Mine.

The neighbouring Dickson, Shulaps and Bendor Ranges are all unprotected and have been or are being heavily logged, except for special preserves in alpine areas of the Shulaps and in its neighbour to the east, the Camelsfoot Range.

Many on the environmentalist side hope that the creation of Tsʼilʔos and Big Creek Provincial Park will help shore up the protection of the Spruce Lake Protected Area. Hunting guide Ted (Chilco) Choate of Gaspard Lake, on the Chilcotin Plateau just northeast of the Spruce Lake Protected Area has joined in the call to combine all these three parks, plus the Churn Creek Protected Area to their northeast, plus some of the surrounding country and the deep, much higher heart of the Pacific Ranges into a National Park. Industry and government remain committed to shared use and sustainable planning.

== Resource Interests ==
Mining interests in the area are few, although the area is rich in copper and there are rumours of pitchblende (which contains uranium), but in over 100 years of exploration no profitable deposits of anything have been found and no major mines established. In recent years, however, clearcut logging has penetrated the flanks of the area and pushed the boundaries of the park from south and east, feeding mills at Lillooet, British Columbia, and beyond in the Thompson-Okanagan. This has generated protests on both sides of the environment vs. resource quarrel, but also instigated a stakeholder committee known as an Integrated Resource Management Process Unit which has had varying degrees of success at resolving disputes and planning land-use in the region.
