= Red Mountain (British Columbia) =

Mountain in Cariboo Regional District, British Columbia, Canada

Coordinates: 51°12′13″N 122°32′55″W

Red Mountain, 2445 m (8022 ft) prominence: 740 m, is the highest summit of the Camelsfoot Range, part of the Chilcotin Plateau located on the west bank of the Fraser River to the north of Lillooet, British Columbia, Canada. Located at the headwaters of the Yalakom River, which is the main north fork of the Bridge River, it has been the site of copper prospects but no major mining activity has so far taken place.

== See also ==
- Red Mountain (disambiguation)
