= British Columbia Interior =

Interior region of British Columbia, Canada

British Columbia Interior French: Intérieur de la Colombie-Britannique
- Region of British Columbia
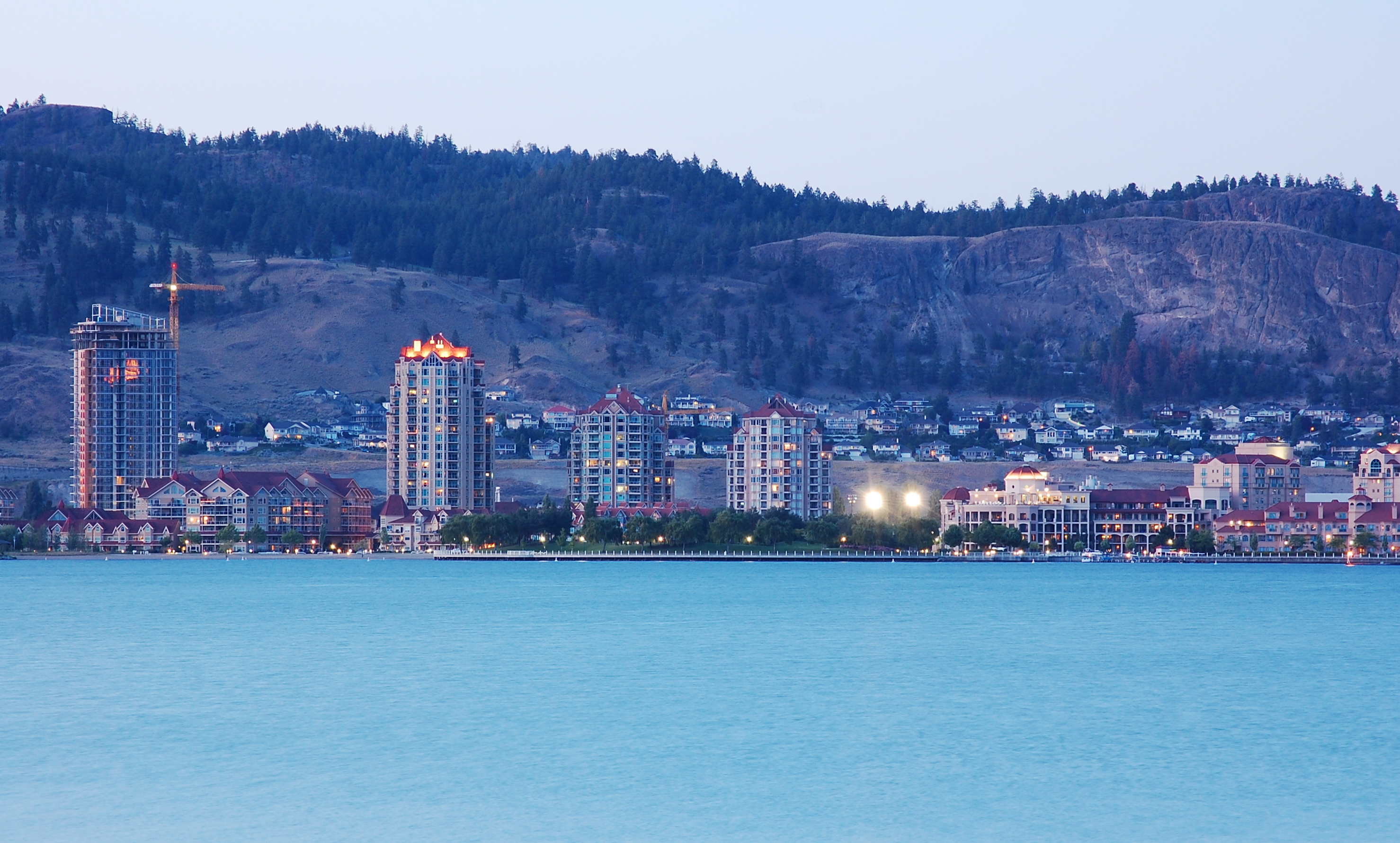
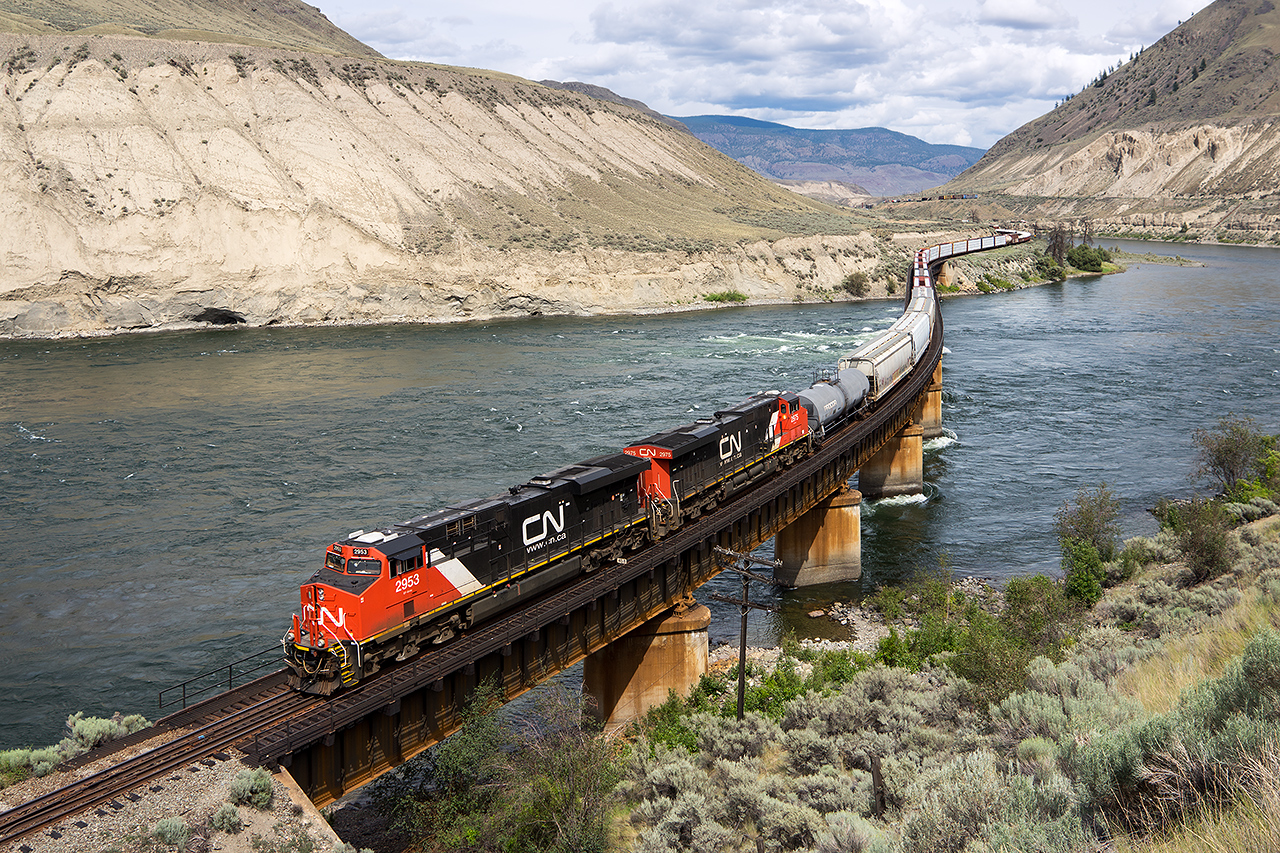
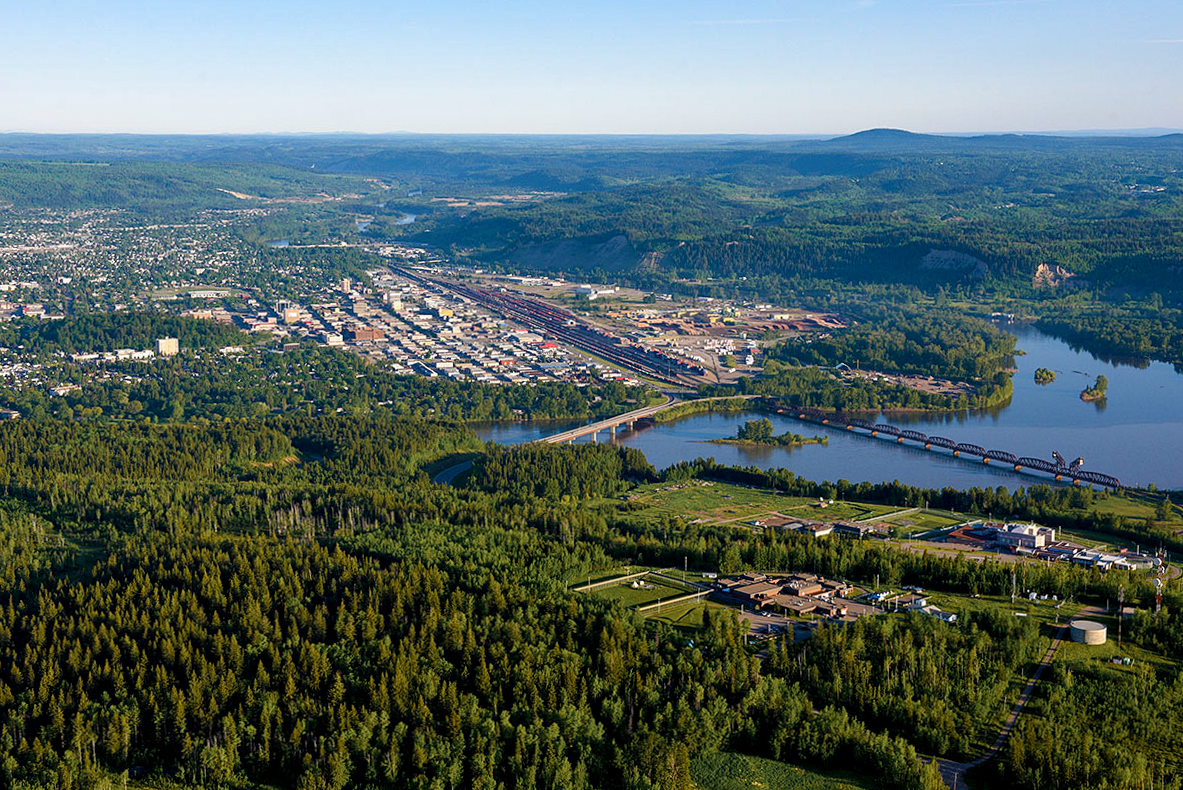
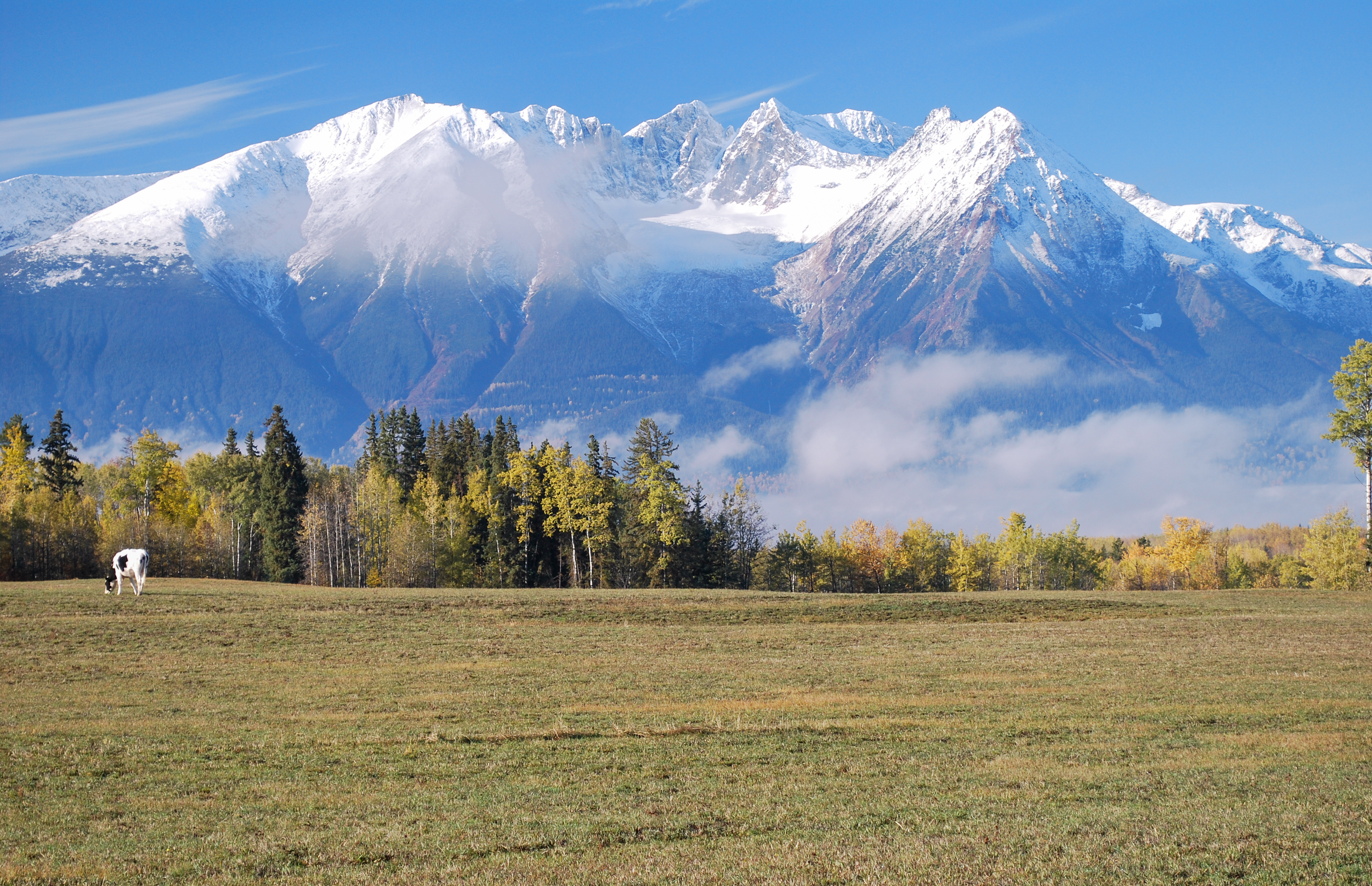
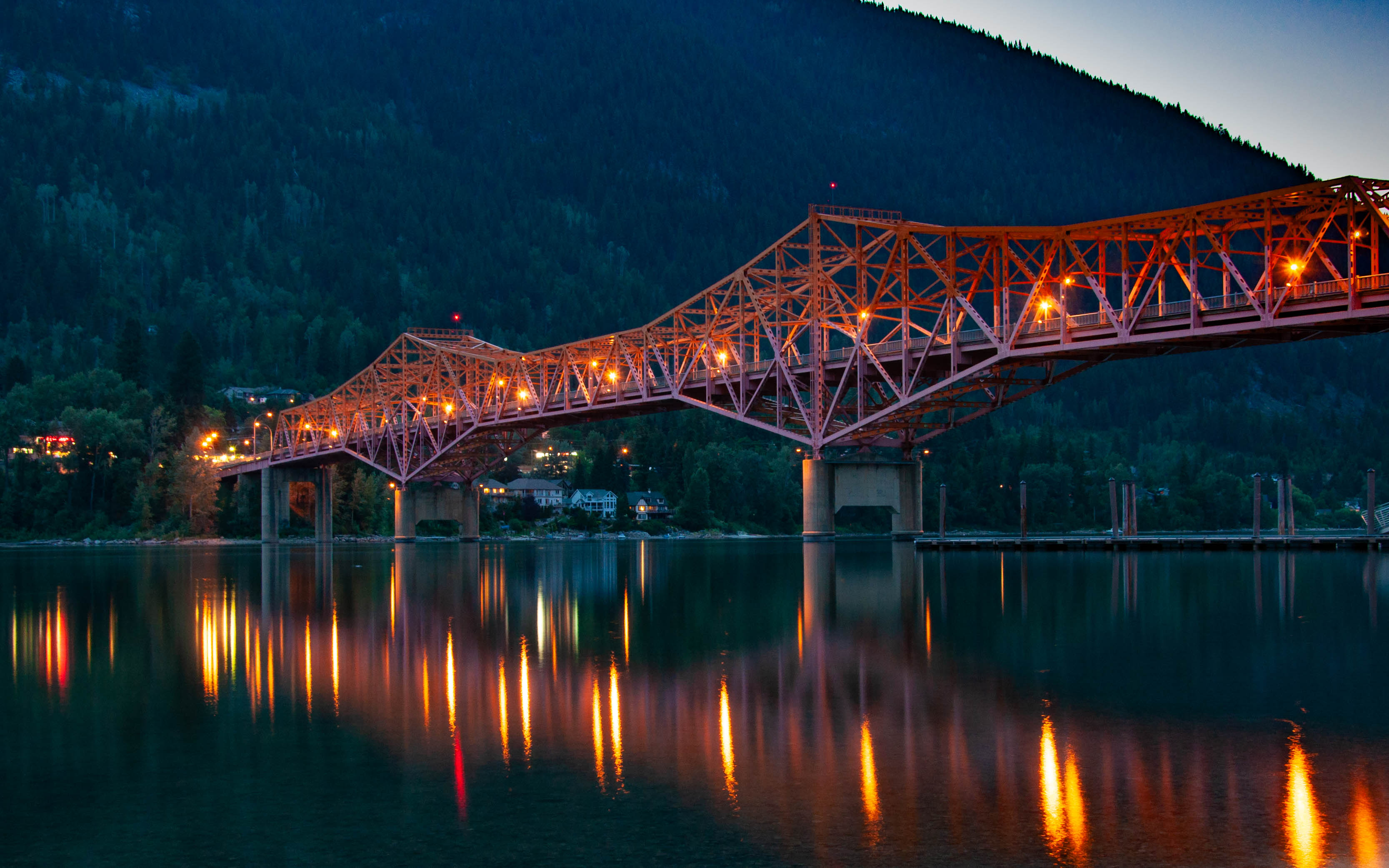
- From top, left to right: Kelowna, CN train traversing Fraser Canyon near Ashcroft, Prince George, Hudson Bay Mountain, Nelson Bridge in Central Kootenay
- Nickname: "The Interior"
- Country: Canada
- Province: British Columbia
- Principal cities: List: Kelowna; Kamloops; Prince George; Vernon; Penticton; West Kelowna; Fort St. John; Cranbrook

Area
  - 14 Districts: 669,648 km^{2} (258,553 sq mi)
- Highest elevation Mt. Fairweather: 4,671 m (15,325 ft)
- Lowest elevation Fraser River: 127 m (417 ft)

Population (2016)
  - Total: 961,155
  - Density: 7.41/km^{2} (19.2/sq mi)
- Time zones: UTC−08:00 (PST)
  - Summer (DST): UTC−07:00 (PDT)
- UTC−07:00 (MST)
  - Summer (DST): UTC−06:00 (MDT)
- Postal code prefixes: V
- Area codes: 236, 250, 672, 778

The British Columbia Interior, popularly referred to as the BC Interior or simply the Interior, is a geographic region of the Canadian province of British Columbia. While the exact boundaries are variously defined, the British Columbia Interior is generally defined to include the 14 regional districts that do not have coastline along the Pacific Ocean or Salish Sea, and are not part of the Lower Mainland. Other boundaries may exclude parts of or even entire regional districts, or expand the definition to include the regional districts of Fraser Valley, Squamish–Lillooet, and Kitimat–Stikine.

Home to just under 1 million people, the British Columbia Interior's 14 regional districts contain many cities, towns, airports, and associated regional, provincial, and national parks connected by the province's highway and railway network. The region is known for the complexity of its landforms, the result of millions of years of tectonic plate movements. The ecology of the region is dominated by temperate coniferous forest with patches of alpine tundra found atop its numerous mountain ranges.

== Definitions ==
The region, which includes the Interior Plateau as well as various mountain ranges and the valleys between them, comprises everything inland from the Coast Mountains and reaching east to the Rocky Mountains and, in the northeast, British Columbia's sector of the Prairies, the Peace River Block."Interior" is usually and properly capitalized but turns up in lower-case in various books and magazines. The non-coastal areas of the province are considered to be "in the Interior", although the sparsely populated regions of its northern half are usually referred to only as "the North".

The town of Hope, at the eastern end of the Fraser Valley and at the foot of the Fraser Canyon, is often considered the "Gateway to the Interior" and bears an entrance arch to that effect, though in practical terms the Interior does not begin until somewhere between Yale and Boston Bar, in the Fraser Canyon, or until the summits of the Coquihalla and Allison Passes. The boundary between "the Coast" and "the Interior" along the Highway 99 corridor is nominally between Whistler and Pemberton, as Pemberton is often described as being in the Interior, but from the inland perspective it is often seen as part of the Coast because of its wetter climate and close ties to the Lower Mainland.

There are many subregions within the Interior, some regions in their own right, and although there are no precise definitions, it is often broken up informally as the Northern Interior, the Central Interior, the Southern Interior, the Northeast Interior and Southeast Interior, and these names often appear in non-governmental organizations and company names as well as in government administrative districts and ministerial regions, and in weather reports.

== Regional Districts ==
Below are the 14 regional districts of British Columbia defined as being in the Interior region:

Regional Districts	Population (2016)	Area (km^{2})	Density (/km^{2})	Head office location
Bulkley-Nechako	37,896	73,361	0.52	Burns Lake
Cariboo	61,988	80,609	0.77	Williams Lake
Central Kootenay	59,517	22,095	2.7	Nelson
Central Okanagan	194,882	2,905	67.1	Kelowna
Columbia-Shuswap	51,366	28,929	1.8	Salmon Arm
East Kootenay	60,439	27,543	2.2	Cranbrook
Fraser-Fort George	94,506	50,676	1.9	Prince George
Kootenay Boundary	31,447	8,082	3.9	Trail
North Okanagan	84,354	7,503	11.2	Coldstream
Northern Rockies	5,393	85,111	0.06	Fort Nelson
Okanagan-Similkameen	83,022	10,414	8.0	Penticton
Peace River	62,942	117,391	0.54	Dawson Creek
Stikine Region	740	118,663	0.01	(n/a)*
Thompson-Nicola	132,663	44,448	3.0	Kamloops

== Major subregions and nomenclature ==
=== Northern Interior Cordillera ===
The Northern Interior begins somewhere between the Cariboo and the city of Prince George, which lies just south of the big bend in the upper Fraser. The city of Quesnel may be considered to be part of the Northern Interior, but it is usually conceived of as primarily being in the Cariboo, which is normally termed the Central Interior, or North-Central Interior. The Northern Interior includes Robson Valley (the upper reaches of the Fraser basin) to the southeast of Prince George as well as the Omineca District and the Bulkley and Nechako basins. The communities of the upper Skeena are sometimes referred to as being in the Northern Interior, though in cultural terms and usual usage they are part of the North Coast, which is associated in regional terms usually with the South and Central Coast and Vancouver Island.

The northern reaches of the Northern Interior beyond the Omineca and Skeena-Bulkley regions is usually just referred to as "the North", although it also is considered part of the Northern Interior. "The North" may also refer to Prince George, one of the largest cities in the Interior and also the only major city in the Northern Interior (although that term can also apply to Prince George), which bears the sobriquet "Queen City of the North".

=== Northern Interior Plain ===
The Northern Interior Plain is a continuation of the interior plain that takes in nearly all of Alberta and southern Saskatchewan and Manitoba. It extends from Monkman Provincial Park and Tumbler Ridge in the south, to Hudson's Hope and the Williston Lake in the west, to Fort St. John and Charlie Lake in the north. The term is used to mean the whole of the Northeastern Interior east of the Rockies, including Fort Nelson and other parts of the Liard drainage, and before W.A.C. Bennett Dam included the upper Peace River through its canyon between Finlay Forks and Hudson's Hope.

=== Central Interior Cordillera ===
The Central Interior is composed, roughly, of the Chilcotin, Cariboo, Bridge River-Lillooet, Fraser Canyon, Nicola, Thompson and Kamloops-Shuswap Countries. Some usages may refer to the Okanagan cities south of the Shuswap as being in the Central Interior, but these are usually referred to as being in the Southern Interior or South-Central Interior. The Nicola, Fraser Canyon, Thompson and Bridge River -Lillooet Country are sometimes also referred to as being in the Southern Interior, with the Bridge River-Lillooet Country sometimes referred to, along with the Chilcotin, as the West-Central Interior, and the Lillooet Country is historically considered to be part of the Cariboo, though distinct in its own right. The Bridge River Country has also been referred to as the West Cariboo, but is not considered to be in the Cariboo by its residents. Many urban residents are under the impression that the Bridge River Country is part of the Chilcotin because of the "South Chilcotin" name for the Spruce Lake Protected Area, but this is incorrect.

=== Southern Interior Cordillera ===
The Southern Interior roughly falls south of the Thompson River and Shuswap Country (corresponding mostly to the post-Oregon Treaty remainder of the old, original, Hudson's Bay Company Columbia District). When used directly, it generally means the Okanagan and adjoining areas, particularly the Similkameen, southern Monashees and Boundary Country. Due to a new federal political riding of the same name (see Southern Interior) the usage has now come to apply to the cities of the West Kootenay, along with the rest of the Kootenays, although the West Kootenay has usually been referred to in the past, and is today, as the Southeast Interior.

=== Exceptions ===
The Big Bend of the Columbia and the Rocky Mountain Trench are in the Interior, but are not usually included in mentions of either the Central Interior or Southern Interior.

=== Historical geographic regions ===
The Interior comprises over 70% of the province and well over 80% of its mainland. As it consists of a series of interlocking valleys and plateaus, geographic effects relating to isolation, physical remoteness, local indigenous culture, the background of various groups of settlers, and more, have contributed to an identifiable patchwork of regional identities, referred to as "districts" or "countries" (e.g., the Omineca Country, the Boundary Country). Usage such as "Lillooet District" are also common but in a few cases that is also a phrase referring to the land district of the same name, which is a system of legal survey blocks rather than descriptive of the actual geocultural landscape which evolved on top of them. In most cases, the "Country" and "District" are often dropped, and these regions are referred to as, for example, "the Kootenay" or "the Omineca". In some cases, notably the Kootenay, the Chilcotin and the Cariboo, they can be are often referred to as simply Kootenay, Chilcotin and Cariboo.. Some are referred to only without the "Country" or "District" attached, such as "the Tulameen" and "the Similkameen", and in other cases this is more common than the longer form though both occur ("the Stikine" is more common than "the Stikine Country". Combination forms are common, such as Cariboo-Chilcotin, and Thompson-Okanagan, and these often turn up in names of governmental administrative districts, electoral districts and private or public organizations. All often correspond to linguistic and cultural-political divisions of the First Nations as aboriginal history was also shaped by the landscape's isolating and defining characteristics as settler culture.

The main historical subregions, with their own subregions an irrespective of very common overlaps between some areas, and in their most common forms, are as follows:

- The Cariboo
  - South Cariboo – (Clinton-100 Mile House-Bridge Lake, sometimes including the Thompson as far south as Lytton.
    - Bonaparte Country – sometimes considered the northern end of "Thompson Country" as these areas share climatic and regional links.
  - North Cariboo
  - Central Cariboo
  - West Cariboo – was once used for the Bridge River Country.
- The Chilcotin
  - West Chilcotin – Chilko and Taseko Lakes area.
  - North Chilcotin – Anahim Lake, Alexis Creek, Nimpo Lake.
  - South Chilcotin – sometimes used for part of the Bridge River Country (see Spruce Lake Protected Area).
- Fraser Canyon – a.k.a. "The Canyon". This term is often used to include the canyon of the Thompson River between Ashcroft and Lytton, partly because the highway route is usually referred to as both the Canyon and the Fraser Canyon.
  - Lillooet Country – considered part of both the Fraser Canyon and the Cariboo, although distinct within both, and also historically including areas not in either.
    - Bridge River Country – an important subarea of the Lillooet Country, often combined as Bridge River-Lillooet and at one time dubbed the West Cariboo. Now sometimes confused with the Chilcotin because of the coining of the term South Chilcotin in the 1950s for the area on its northern flank.
- Thompson Country
  - Thompson Plateau
  - South Thompson – the area around Kamloops, from Chase to Ashcroft.
  - Bonaparte Country (usually considered part of the Cariboo but shares more links geographically to the Thompson)
- Nicola Country – sometimes considered part of the Thompson, and comprising much of the Thompson Plateau, where it is drained by the Nicola River.
- The Okanagan
  - South Okanagan
  - Central Okanagan – the area around Kelowna.
  - North Okanagan (also Northern Okanagan)
- Shuswap Country – the area around Shuswap Lake, but not including the upper Shuswap River drainage east of the Okanagan, which is usually considered part of the North Okanagan or the Monashees.
- Boundary Country – often included with the West Kootenay, or with the Okanagan.
- The Monashees – sometimes considered a separate area, often included in others; the Southern Monashees are tied to or part of the Boundary Country.
- Similkameen Country – frequently included with the southern Okanagan.
  - The Tulameen
- The Kootenays a.k.a. "the Kootenay"
  - West Kootenay
    - Slocan
    - Arrow Lakes
  - East Kootenay
    - Elk Valley
- The Columbia – the valley of the Upper Columbia south of Golden is often included in the East Kootenay, while the Arrow Lakes region south of Revelstoke is usually considered part the West Kootenay.
  - Big Bend Country
- Robson Valley
- Omineca Country
- Cassiar District
- Peace River Country – extends into northern Alberta.
  - Peace River Block
- The Bulkley – often combined with the sub-coastal Skeena Country as Skeena-Bulkley, along the route of the Yellowhead Highway.
- The Nechako
- Stikine Country (not the same as Stikine Region, which is part of the regional district system, though not a regional district itself, and includes the Atlin District (also known as the Atlin Country) and the Cassiar Country, and only a part of the Stikine Country, most of which is in the Regional District of Kitimat–Stikine and includes some of the Liard Country, which refers to areas immediately adjoining the Liard River.
- the northern Rocky Mountain Trench and adjoining areas of the Northern Rockies, north of Lake Williston, do not belong to any of the appellations adjoining them. In usual usage, they are referred to directly or in reference to rivers within them e.g. the Finlay Country.

== Demographics ==
As of 2016 the population is 961,155.

== Society and culture ==
The British Columbia Interior's society and culture is affected by the populations of First Nations Canadians and French-Canadians people and residents living close to the US - Canada border.

== Transportation ==
The Trans-Canada Highway (TCH) is the major roadway through the region. The TCH enters the region from the south after 186 km (116 mi) through the Fraser Canyon in the Lower Mainland toward Cache Creek. As a mostly high mobility highway with only occasional mandatory stops, it heads east for 79 km (49 mi) through to Kamloops where it becomes a short freeway. Then it continues 496 km (308 mi) east through Salmon Arm, Revelstoke, Rogers Pass, Golden, and Kicking Horse Pass (the highest point on the highway, at 1,627 metres), to Banff, Alberta.

== See also ==
- British Columbia Coast
- Interior Health
