= Mount Bishop =

Mount Bishop may refer to:

- Mount Bishop (Elk Range) on the Continental Divide and the boundary between the provinces of British Columbia and Alberta, Canada
- Mount Bishop (Fannin Range) in the North Shore Mountains of British Columbia, Canada
- Mount Bishop (Camelsfoot Range), a mountain near Lillooet, British Columbia, Canada
- Mount Bishop (Antarctica) in Antarctica

== See also ==
- Bishop Peak (disambiguation)
