= Tyaughton Creek =

50 kilometre tributary of British Columbia's Bridge River

Coordinates: 50°54′00″N 122°37′00″W

Tyaughton Creek, formerly gazetted as the Tyaughton River, also historically known as Tyoax Creek, is a 50 kilometre tributary of British Columbia's Bridge River, flowing generally southeast to enter the main flow of that river about mid-way along the length of Carpenter Lake, a reservoir formed by Terzaghi Dam of the Bridge River Power Project.

== Course ==
The creek begins at Tyoax Pass, at the divide between the basins of the Bridge River and that of Big Creek, which is a tributary of the Chilcotin River. Its upper course flows east, then turns south and then southeast, entering a progressively deeper canyon until just northeast of Tyaughton Lake, which is connected to it by a short creek, and then turns east-southeast between Pearson Ridge (SW) and Marshall Ridge (NE) in a continuation of its canyon until it emerges as a side-inlet of Carpenter Lake which was formed by the creation of Carpenter Lake. That inlet is bridged at the mouth of that inlet by BC Highway 40, also known as the Lillooet-Gold Bridge Road or the Carpenter Lake Road. Before the lake's creation its outlet was at the lower side of the road, and it was bridged by the predecessor route, then known as the Bridge River Road.

Access to Tyaughton Creek is available from a series of secondary roads that run parallel to the creek upstream from where it passes Tyaughton Lake. Between Tyaughton Lake and its outlet into Carpenter Lake, however, the steep-sided gorges make for difficult and sometimes treacherous access on foot.

== Tributaries ==
Tyaughton Creek's main tributaries are Liza Creek, Eldorado Creek, Noaxe Creek, Mud Creek and Relay Creek. Tyaughton, Eldorado and Relay Creeks all have their sources at passes along the northwestern boundary of the area known as the Spruce Lake Protected Area. The protected area has seen various park proposal names, including the Charlie Cunningham Wilderness and the Spruce Lake-Eldorado Mountain park, and most recently as the "South Chilcotin Provincial Park" but this status was downgraded from park to protected area in 2006.

== History ==
The name Tyaughton is an adaptation of the Chilcotin word for "jumping fish", and has also appeared on the map in the form Tyoax or Tyax, the latter being the simplified form used by the Tyax Mountain Lake Resort, a five-star resort on Tyaughton Lake, which is a tributary to the creek. The name appears to have been conferred by Chief Hunter Jack, chief of the Lakes Lillooet (a subdivision of the St'at'imc, today's Nequatque and Seton Lake First Nations) during the later 19th Century and a legendary hunting guide who held claim to the title of Hyas Tyee (king) of the Bridge River Country.

Hunter Jack's gold wealth was also legendary and is believed to be based on a mysterious placer find, believed to be somewhere in the uppermost reaches of Tyaughton Creek (he is known to have chased off parties of Italian and Chinese miners who were getting too close). His adoption of a Chilcotin name for a lake in his territory conforms to other Chilcotin names in use in St'at'imc territory, notably that of the adjacent Shulaps Range (just east of Tyaughton Creek) and the Yalakom River, just east of that range, and also Noaxe Lake, high on the side of the Shulaps Range above the Tyaughton basin.

Hunter Jack was one of the few Lillooet natives who spoke Chilcotin, and is said to have learned it in order to end a bloody war which had raged over the rich hunting and food-gathering grounds of the area of the upper Bridge River, including the basin of Tyauughton Creek. The end of the war is said to have come about at a place now called Graveyard Valley, which lies over a narrow defile from the head of Relay Creek, Tyaughton's northernmost tributary, which is in the upper basin of Big Creek, a tributary of the Chilcotin River.

The polychromatic mineralization of the Tyaughton basin's geology caught the eye of early explorers, but despite extensive exploration no viable mines have ever operated in its boundaries. In the 1930s, times when the Bridge River Country was as much known for big-game hunting as for gold mining, Charlie Cunningham, a guide and multi-faceted entrepreneur in the goldfield hub of Gold Bridge first promoted the idea of protecting the region north of Gun Creek and west of Tyaughton and south of Relay, as a wildlife preserve and scenic wilderness treasure, and in the process became a pioneering wildlife cinematographer. In the years since the region has been a hot-point in the mining industry's complaints about protectionist restrictions, and mining interests have been the primary factor in blocking full park status for the area. Although some of the area has been established as a provincial protected area and the adjacent basins to the north and northwest are now provincial park, controversy over its eventual boundaries continues.

== See also ==
- List of rivers of British Columbia
- Gun Creek
