= Tyoax Pass =

Mountain pass in British Columbia, Canada

- Location within British Columbia

Third Approach
- Location: British Columbia, Canada
- Range: Chilcotin Ranges
- Coordinates: 51°08′00″N 123°04′00″W
- Topo map: NTS 92O3 Warner Pass

Tyoax Pass is a mountain pass in the Chilcotin Ranges of the Pacific Ranges, the southernmost main subdivision of the Coast Mountains of British Columbia, Canada. Located at the head of Tyaughton Creek, a north tributary of the Bridge River, it connects the basin of the Bridge River with that of Big Creek in the southern Chilcotin District, and is therefore at the boundary between the Spruce Lake Protected Area and Big Creek Provincial Park.

== Name ==
"Tyoax", pronounced "TIE-ax" in English, is a variant of "Tyaughton", which is from a Chilcotin language word meaning "jumping fish" and is also the name of Tyaughton Lake.

== See also ==
- List of mountain passes
