= Dash Creek =

Coordinates: 51°15′13″N 122°42′19″W

Dash Creek is a river in the Canadian province of British Columbia which flows easterly to join Churn Creek, a tributary of the Fraser River. Dash Creek rises on the northern slopes of the Dash Plateau and Dash Hill in the South Chilcotin Mountains as well as taking in several tributaries draining the south slopes of the Hungry Mountains.
