= Dickson Range =

Mountain range in British Columbia, Canada

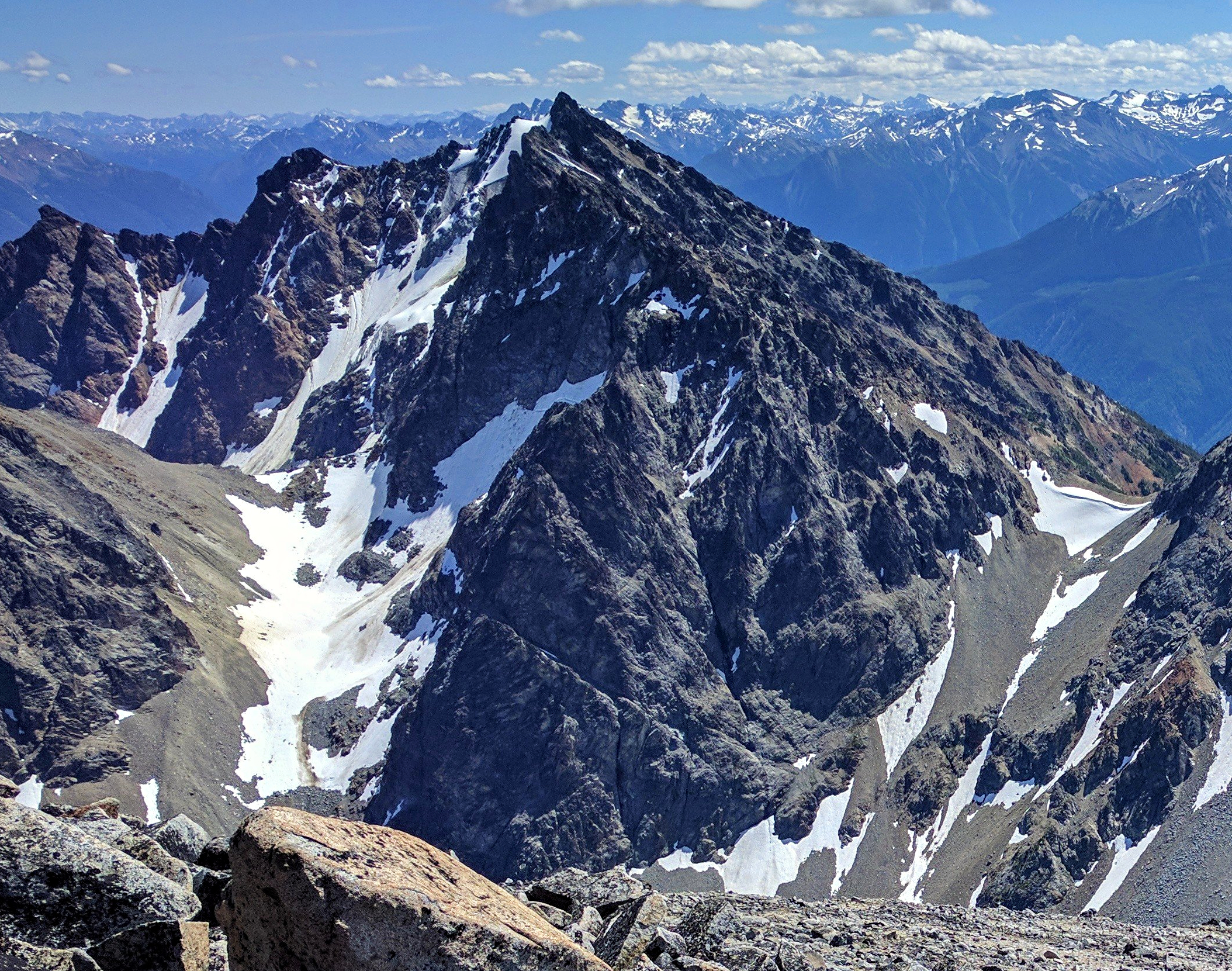
- Mt. Penrose as seen from Dickson Peak

Highest point
- Peak: Dickson Peak
- Elevation: 2,814 m (9,232 ft)
- Coordinates: 50°53′37″N 122°59′19″W

Dimensions
- Area: 302 km^{2} (117 mi^{2})

Geography
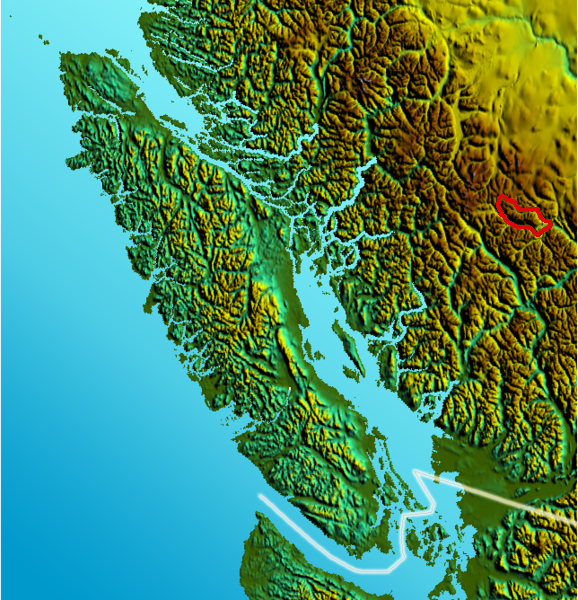
- Location of Dickson Range
- Country: Canada
- Province: British Columbia
- Range coordinates: 50°51′59″N 123°06′00″W
- Parent range: Chilcotin Ranges

The Dickson Range is a subrange of the Chilcotin Ranges subset of the Pacific Ranges of the Coast Mountains in southwest-central British Columbia. It is located just west of the town of Gold Bridge between the valley of Slim Creek to the north (a tributary of Gun Creek) and Downton Lake Reservoir to the south. At its eastern foot is Gun Lake; its western limit is at a pass between Slim Creek and Nichols Creek (which feeds the upper Bridge River just before it enters Downton Lake) near the pass which separates the Bridge River basin from that of the Lord River, which feeds the Taseko Lakes.

The range is approximately 3,500 km^{2} (1,400 sq mi) in area and about 35 km in length. Its highest Peak, Dickson Peak (also known as Mount Dickson) is a stunning pyramidal peak towards the eastern end of the range, overlooking the middle Bridge River Valley to the east and also visible on the canyon road between Gold Bridge and Bralorne. The drop from Dickson's summit to Downton Lake is c.2075m (6775') in only 5 km (3.1 mi).

Just southeast of Dickson Peak is Mount Penrose 2,634 m (8,642 ft), which a cockscomb-like summit which stands immediately above Gun Lake and its resort community. Penrose was named for Republican Senator Boies Penrose (November 1, 1860 – December 31, 1921) who climbed it in the 1920s while hunting with famed local big-game outfitter W.G. (Bill) Manson. Penrose was an avid outdoorsman and another mountain in the Flathead area of Montana also bears his name.

Penrose is the best-known summit in the Dickson after Dickson Peak, but farther east along the range are Scherle Peak 2,677 m (8,783 ft) and Tillworth Mountain 2,631 m (8,632 ft). A peak named Sorcerer 2,602 m (8,537 ft) occupies a separate ridge on the northwest end of the range, adjacent to the Leckie Range just north across Slim Creek.

To the north and northeast of the Dickson Range is the Spruce Lake Protected Area a.k.a. the "South Chilcotin", while to the northwest is Ts'ilʔos Provincial Park.
