= Black Dome Mountain =

Northernmost summit of the Camelsfoot Range

- Location within British Columbia
- Interactive map of Black Dome Mountain

Highest point
- Elevation: 2,252 m (7,388 ft)
- Prominence: 662 m (2,172 ft)
- Coordinates: 51°19′55″N 122°29′06″W

Naming
- Native name: Dẑelh Lhet’es (Chilcotin)

Geography
- Location: British Columbia, Canada
- District: Yale Division Yale Land District
- Parent range: Camelsfoot Range, Interior Plateau
- Topo map: NTS 92O8 Empire Valley

Geology
- Rock age: Eocene
- Mountain type: Butte
- Last eruption: Pliocene

Black Dome Mountain is the northernmost summit of the Camelsfoot Range, which lies along the west side of the Fraser River, north of Lillooet, British Columbia, Canada. It is an ancient butte-like volcano located in the formation known as the Chilcotin Group, which lie between the Pacific Ranges of the Coast Mountains and the mid-Fraser River in British Columbia, Canada.

== Location and terrain ==
Black Dome is located in the angle of Churn Creek and the Fraser Canyon, 27 km (17 mi) southwest of Dog Creek Bridge at Gang Ranch. It is the northernmost summit of the Camelsfoot Range, which lines the west bank of the Fraser north of Lillooet. The Churn Creek Protected Area adjoins the north and western flanks of the mountain, while the Fraser Canyon runs southward along its eastern flank.

== Geology ==
Like other volcanic landforms in British Columbia, Black Dome Mountain is part of the Pacific Ring of Fire which includes over 160 active volcanoes. There are obsidian deposits and other deposits around the volcano. It has produced olivine basalt dykes, lavas, and agglomerate. Black Dome Mountain is thought to have formed as a result of extension of the crust behind the Cascadia subduction zone and last erupted during the Pliocene.

== History ==
During the early 1950s, Black Dome Mountain was the site of gold mining prospects by Bralorne Mines Inc. and produced a bit of an excitement for people that lived near the mountain.

== See also ==
- Anahim Volcanic Belt
- Garibaldi Volcanic Belt
- List of volcanoes in Canada
- Volcanism of Canada
- Volcanism of Western Canada
