= Hunter Jack =

Hunter Jack (d. 1905) was a Stʼatʼimc (Lillooet) chief from Shalalth who inhabited the Bridge River Country region of southwestern British Columbia.

He is remembered by the Lillooet as a prolific hunter, trapper, and the one who negotiated peace between the Lillooet and the Chilcotin peoples.

== Life ==
His English name was Jack Tashpola or Tash Poli. He was born at 22-Mile post.

=== Hunting and trapping ===
Jack was described as a first-class big game hunter, who trapped and hunted in the Bridge River Country. Renowned for storytelling, he would boast of hand-to-hand combat with wild animals. He assisted guides who led trophy hunters to the Lillooet area. In the 1880s, he met visiting hunter Captain (later Admiral) Seymour, who was so impressed by Jack that he subsequently sent him a flag and naval uniform as gifts. Jack raised the flag in front of his cabin and wore the uniform on occasions. His colleagues did not question this self-titled status. He exerted significant control over the meat sale business in the area.

=== Murder charges ===
In 1882, Hunter Jack was charged but not tried for the murder of the Poole family. Evidence pointed to other perpetrators.

In 1900, when Jack found his daughter Julia Ann hanged, the official verdict was murder, but many suspected suicide, according to a contemporary newspaper. The girl, who had been missing for several days, had been drinking heavily for some time.

=== Mining career ===
He was one of the most successful placer miners in the district. He never lived on the reserve but had a cabin near the confluence of the Hurley River. He held potlatches at which he presented gold nuggets to his guests. Pointing his rifle to intimidate, he drove the Chinese miners from Marshall Creek and Tyaughton Creek. Many believed Jack found most of his gold around the head of Tyax (Tyaughton) creek.

In 1913, it was claimed that old and decayed sluice boxes were discovered at a site which was possibly where Jack once found impressive gold nuggets. Other reports claim searches for the location were unsuccessful.

== Death ==
In 1905, Jack and his son William were drinking gin while paddling a boat on Seton Lake. In rough water close to shore, each time Jack attempted to stand, he fell, striking his head on a section of the boat. William dragged his father to shore. On dry land, Jack continued to drink while William built a fire. After warming himself at a residence about two miles away, William returned to find his father dead. Jack was about 70 years of age. The official verdict was death from excessive drinking and exposure. A contemporary newspaper account describes him as commonly intoxicated, allegedly threatening with violence anyone who crossed his path. He was buried at D’Arcy and his son, Thomas Jack, succeeded him as hereditary chief. In 1907, William would die of exposure while out trapping with his brother Johnnie.

== Bridge River ferry ==
In the late 1800s, Jack operated the first ferry across the upper Bridge River for a period. For this toll operation, he used a canoe to carry passengers and supplies, but horses swam.

In August 1898, Charles Mowson was awarded the ferry charter for a year. During the first 10 days, four horses drowned and several had narrow escapes. One horse being towed tried to board the boat, almost capsizing it. Brother Thomas Mowson, who assisted in the venture, took over when Charles died in a hunting accident the following February. The charter renewed for a further five years, a larger ferry was installed, which could also carry livestock.

In April 1900, G.A. Ward purchased the T.R. Mowson ferry operation. Two months later when the cable broke, Ward jumped from the drifting ferry. The scow was destroyed by the raging torrent downriver. After a month, a new scow was in operation. The ferry received a government subsidy from 1905 almost until service ended, which occurred in 1910, when the Ward's Ferry bridge was built. Sebring Creek flowed into Bridge River about a mile above that bridge.

When the Carpenter Lake reservoir for the Mission Dam filled in the 1950s, the remnants of the then Hanson's bridge floated away after a few years.
