= Bishop Peak =

Bishop Peak may refer to:

- Bishop Peak (Antarctica)
- Bishop Peak (California)

== See also ==
- Mount Bishop (disambiguation)
