= Dog Creek, British Columbia =

Dog Creek
- Location of Dog Creek in British Columbia
- Coordinates: 51°34′53″N 122°14′08″W
- Country: Canada
- Province: British Columbia
- Time zone: UTC−07:00 (PT)
- Area codes: 250, 778

Dog Creek is an unincorporated ranching settlement, located on the Fraser River, in the Cariboo region of British Columbia, Canada. Located on the northeast side of the Fraser's confluence with Dog Creek, it is opposite Gang Ranch on the west side of the river, which is connected by an old suspension bridge serving local ranch roads. Dog Creek's first post office opened in 1873. The Dog Creek reserves of the Canoe Creek/Dog Creek Indian Band are located east of the settlement. The ranches at Dog Creek, along with the Gang Ranch, mostly hire First Nations cowboys, most of them coming from the Canoe Creek/Dog Creek Band.

== Dog Creek Station of the Royal Canadian Air Force ==
The Dog Creek Station of the Royal Canadian Air Force opened during World War II as an RCAF supplementary aerodrome.

In approximately 1942 the aerodrome was listed as RCAF Aerodrome - Dog Creek, British Columbia at 51°38′N 122°16′W with a variation of 26 degrees 16' E and elevation of 3,250 feet (991 m). The aerodrome was listed as "Under construction - Servicable" with three runways as follows:

Runway name	Length	Width	Surface
5/23	6,900 feet (2,103 m)	500 feet (152 m)	Turf
18/36	5,700 feet (1,737 m)	500 feet (152 m)	Turf
9/27	6,000 feet (1,829 m)	500 feet (152 m)	Turf

The airfield was in the standard triangle-pattern, with double, side-by-side runways. The aerodrome was taken over by Department of Transport in 1946.

Activities at the Dog Creek Airport were drastically reduced when the Williams Lake Airport opened in 1960. Most of the staff and facilities were moved to Williams Lake.

The aerodrome was purchased by Circle "S" Cattle Company in 1962 and one runway remained in use by hunters and fishermen.

Today, the aerodrome is abandoned. Other than the rapidly crumbling runways, nothing remains from the RCAF days.

== See also ==
- Dog Creek (disambiguation)
- List of crossings of the Fraser River
- List of historic ranches in British Columbia
