= Liard Country =

Coordinates: 59°40′00″N 127°09′00″W

The Liard Country, also known as The Liard, is a region in northern British Columbia. It generally describes the immediate region surrounding the Liard River along the Alaska Highway and west of the line of the Rockies.

There are few settlements in the region, and most are long the Alaska Highway. Notable places include Toad River, Liard River, Fireside, and Lower Post.

The eastern part of the region is within the Northern Rockies Regional Municipality.
