= Dog Creek (Osage River tributary) =

Stream in the U.S. state of Missouri

Coordinates: 38°14′58″N 92°26′00″W

Dog Creek is a stream in Miller County in the U.S. state of Missouri. It is a tributary of the Osage River.

The stream headwaters are at and the confluence with the Osage is at .

Tradition states a man was bitten by a dog near Dog Creek, causing its name to be selected.

== See also ==
- List of rivers of Missouri
