= Dog Creek (Lick Creek tributary) =

Stream in Hickman and Maury County, Tennessee, U.S.

Coordinates: 35.819789°N 87.274732°W

Dog Creek is a stream in Hickman and Maury counties, Tennessee, in the United States. It is a tributary of Lick Creek.

Dog Creek was so named from an incident when an early settler killed a wolf (he called it a "dog wolf") that was preying on his farm animals.

== See also ==
- List of rivers of Tennessee
