= Moha, British Columbia =

Rural locality in British Columbia

Moha
- Location of Moha in British Columbia
- Coordinates: 50°52′20″N 122°10′10″W
- Country: Canada
- Province: British Columbia
- Area codes: 250, 778

Moha is a rural locality located at the confluence of the Bridge and Yalakom Rivers, 30 km northwest of Lillooet, British Columbia, Canada. The name derives from that of a rock formation on the north (right) bank of the Yalakom River overlooking the confluence, meaning "land of plenty" and which was adopted as the name of the Moha Ranch, one of several small ranches and farms in the area, which is located on the benchland above the rock formation.

The surrounding rural neighbourhood, which includes land-holdings up the Yalakom River, and along the Bridge River from Michelmoon Creek in the Bridge River Canyon downstream to Antoine Creek, is known locally in the Lillooet Country region as Yalakom (as opposed to "the Yalakom", which refers to the basin and terrain of the Yalakom River and includes uninhabited areas far upstream from Moha/Yalakom).
