= Gold Bridge =

Unincorporated community in the Bridge River Country of British Columbia, Canada

Coordinates: 50°51′N 122°51′W

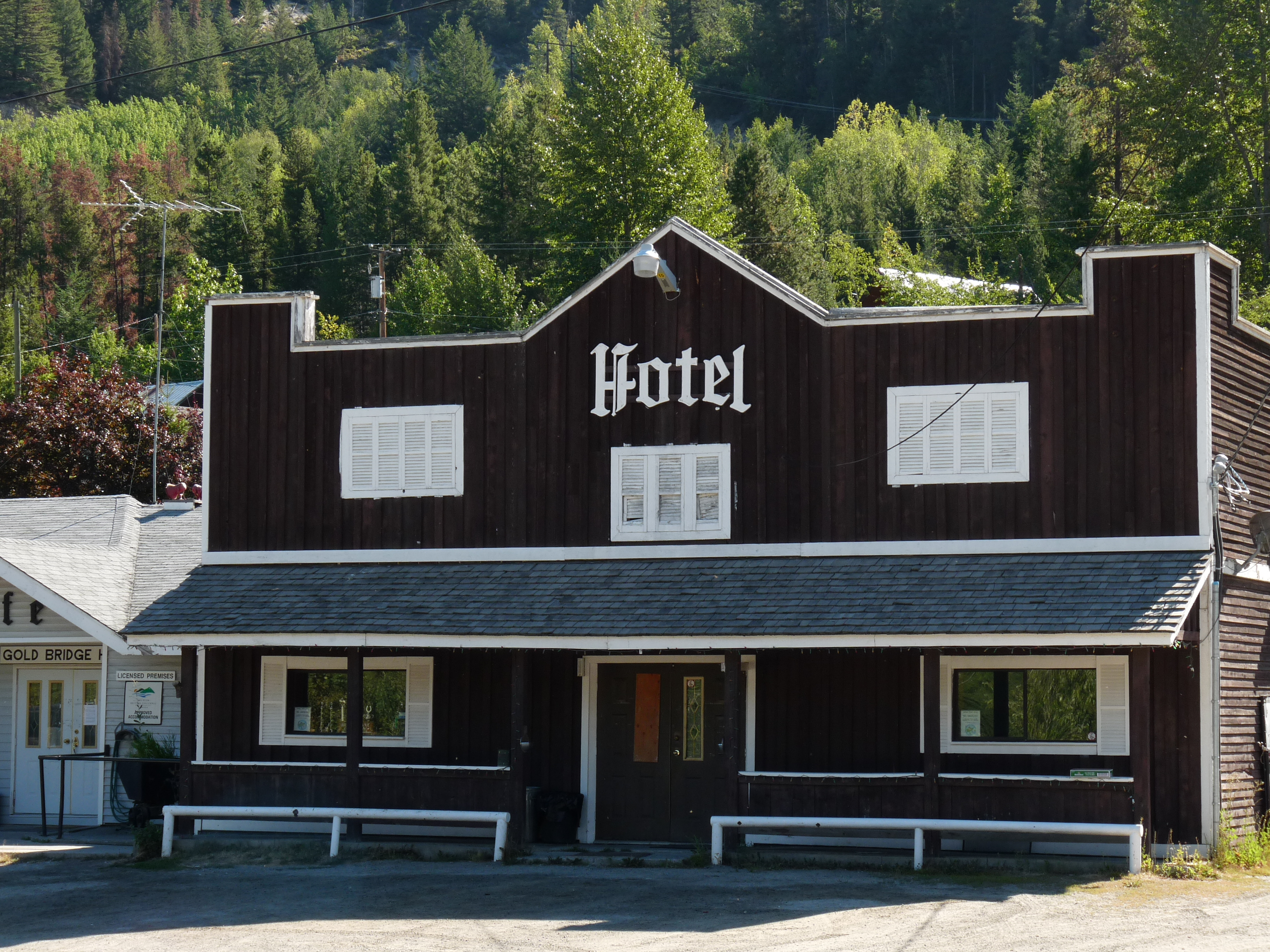
The Gold Bridge Hotel and pub

Gold Bridge is an unincorporated community in the Bridge River Country of British Columbia, Canada. Although numbering only around 40 inhabitants, Gold Bridge is the service and supply centre for the upper basin of the Bridge River Valley, which includes recreation-residential areas at the Gun Lakes, Tyaughton Lake, Marshall Creek, and Bralorne; and the nearby ghost towns of Brexton and Pioneer Mine.

Located at the confluence of the Bridge River with its south fork, the Hurley River, Gold Bridge began as a freewheeling merchandising and services center supplementary to the company-run gold mining towns, and in its heyday had a large commercial roster ranging from insurance through to bootleggers and "sporting houses".

Gold Bridge can be accessed via Highway 40 from Lillooet, or via an upgraded backroad from Pemberton and Whistler known as the Hurley Main, which uses a pass at the head of the Hurley River to access the valley of the upper Lillooet River north of Pemberton.

== Climate and terrain ==
Gold Bridge enjoys relatively dry, sunny, and snowy winters (up to 3 feet) and fairly hot, dry summers in an almost semi-arid subalpine Pine Forest environment. Its 610 m+ altitude is compensated by open exposure in the broad basin of the upper Bridge River.

== Tourism and recreation ==
Nearby Gun Lake, three kilometers away, has been a recreation retreat since the "glory days" of the Bridge River mines in the 1930s. Nearby Little Gun Lake is home to a private lodge of the same name, built by promoters of the Bralorne Mine to house dignitaries visiting the valley, which previously operated as a boutique hotel. Both Gun Lakes are known for fishing, as are Tyaughton (Tyax) and Marshall Lakes and the Spruce Lake. The South Chilcotin Mountains Provincial Park lies immediately north of Gold Bridge beyond Gun Creek, north of Gun Lake. The Downton Lake and Carpenter Lake reservoirs are not suitable for general recreation, other than campsites and power boating, and they have been stocked, but the best fishing in all areas is at the many smaller lakes in the Bridge River basin. Hunting is fairly active in certain areas at different times of the year.

The biggest tourism attraction near Gold Bridge, other than the area's scenery and lakes, is the vintage 1930s gold mining ghost town of Bralorne-Pioneer Mine. This is located about 10 km south-southeast up Cadwallader Creek, beyond the 5 km canyon of the Hurley River. At one time not only the largest town in the regional district and one of the few places in British Columbia to prosper during the Great Depression of the 1930s, Bralorne was also the richest gold mine in Canada's history, and had the third-deepest shaft in the world. Often proposed for a ski area, a number of proposals to develop Bralorne have not progressed.

Hiking, mountain biking, 4x4'ing and backcountry exploration and camping are common throughout the region surrounding Gold Bridge. The Southern Chilcotin Mountains Provincial Park has been known for its unusual semiarid alpine scenery and wildlife for over a hundred years, while the Bendor Range, which Gold Bridge is at the foot of, is a favourite with alpinists and outdoor expeditionists. A trail connects via a tributary of Cadwallader Creek to McGillivray Pass, which connects into the deep valley of Anderson Lake near D'Arcy, but this route like the Hurley has never been developed though proposed both for a highway and a cog railway connecting to the PGE line at the foot of the pass. The cluster of ranges between that pass and Pemberton, 77 km southwest, is also accessible from Gold Bridge and is popular with hikers, although access from the Gold Bridge side has not been promoted.

== Education ==
Gold Bridge school had an attendance of 5 pupils in the 2015-2016 school year. It is the only school in the Bridge River Valley.
