= Bralorne =

Historic Canadian gold mining community

Coordinates: 50.783°N 122.817°W

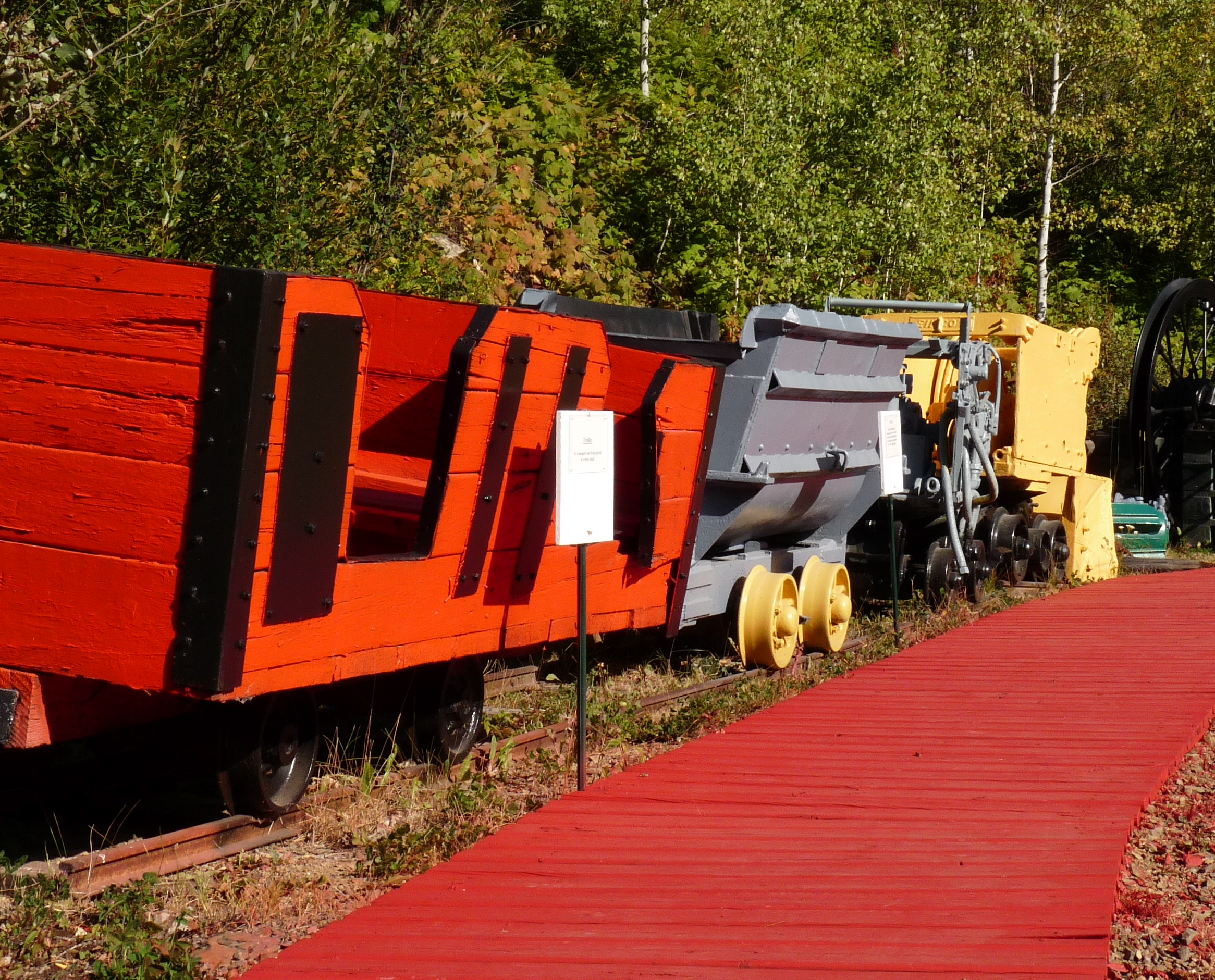
Old mining equipment displayed at the Bralorne-Pioneer Museum

Bralorne (/ˈbreɪlɔːrn/ BRAY-lorn) is a historic Canadian gold mining community in the Bridge River District of British Columbia, some 130 km on dirt roads west of the town of Lillooet.

== Background ==
Gold has been the central element in the area's history going back to the 1858-1860 Fraser River Gold Rush. Miners rushed to the Cayoosh and Bridge River areas looking for placer deposits, One named Cadwallader looked for the outcroppings on the creek that is now named for him and turned out later to be the site of the richest hard-rock veins in the region. Early exploratory parties of Chinese and Italians in the upper Bridge River basin were driven out by Chief Hunter Jack, who himself had a secret placer mine somewhere in the region, believed to be in upper Tyaughton Creek. and whose big-game hunting territory this also was. During the 1870s Hunter Jack began to invite chosen prospectors into the valley, and ran a ferry across the Bridge River that virtually all entering the region had to cross. Among these were those who would eventually discover the hard rock lodes on Cadwallader Creek. Though styled the Bridge River Gold Rush, in this early period there were so few who had made it into the district that there were only forty residents during the 1890 Census, prompting the naming of one of the claims "Forty Thieves".

== Bralorne today ==
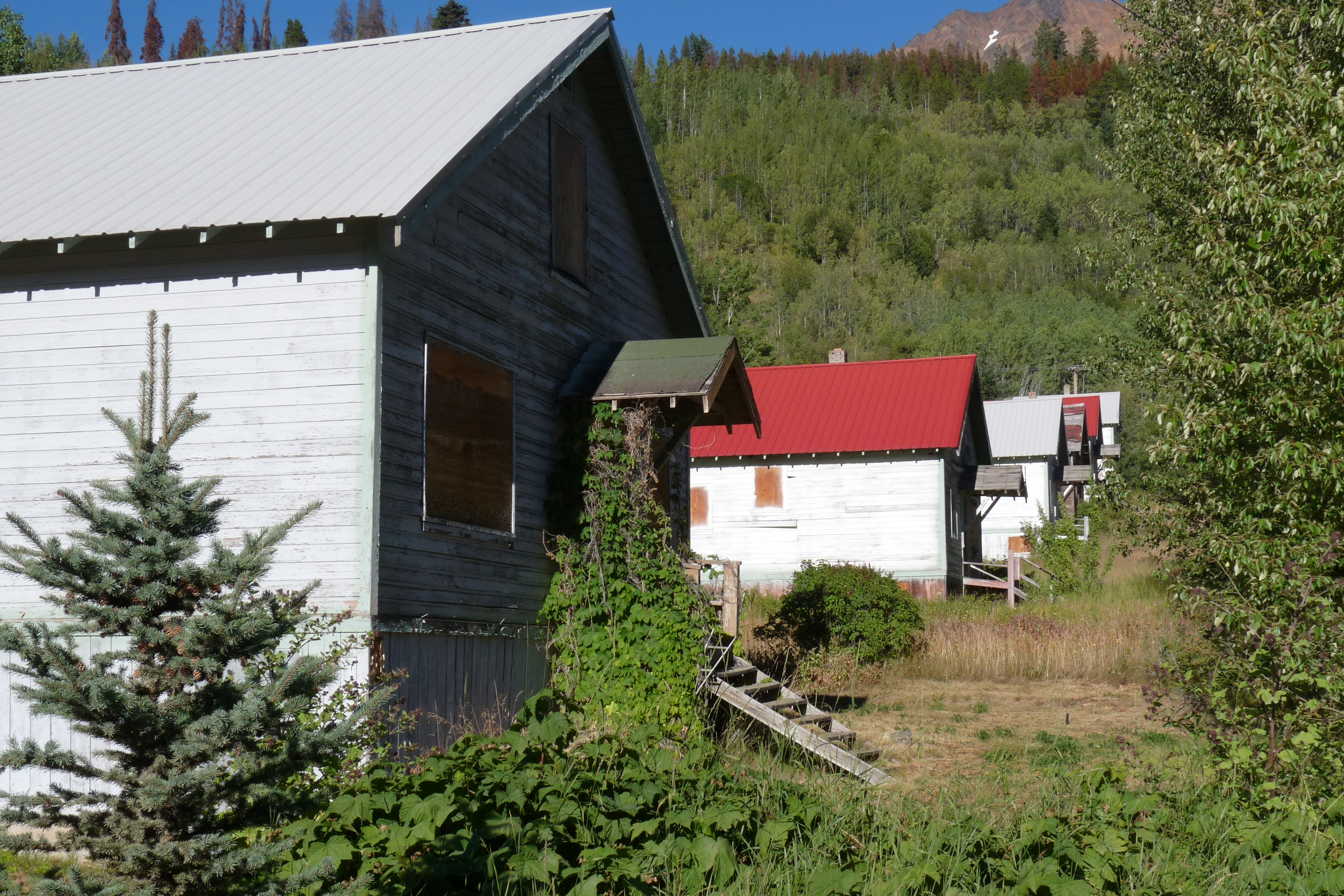
Bradian is an unoccupied neighbourhood of Bralorne, aka "Third Townsite".

Since 2002, rising gold prices have led to new exploration in the area and plans for re-opening the Bralorne Mine, and nearby Pioneer Mine. In 2014, a realtor put the Bralorne's "third townsite", Bradian, on sale for $1 million. Around 2016, the entire town was sold for just over one million dollars. It is a ghost town consisting of some 20 dwellings last occupied in the 1970s.

== Climate ==
Climate data for Bralorne
Month	Jan	Feb	Mar	Apr	May	Jun	Jul	Aug	Sep	Oct	Nov	Dec	Year
Record high °C (°F)	11.0 (51.8)	14.4 (57.9)	20.0 (68.0)	30.6 (87.1)	35.6 (96.1)	33.9 (93.0)	37.8 (100.0)	36.1 (97.0)	35.6 (96.1)	30.6 (87.1)	15.6 (60.1)	11.1 (52.0)	37.8 (100.0)
Mean daily maximum °C (°F)	−5.0 (23.0)	1.8 (35.2)	5.0 (41.0)	10.1 (50.2)	15.7 (60.3)	18.9 (66.0)	22.7 (72.9)	21.9 (71.4)	17.8 (64.0)	10.0 (50.0)	1.3 (34.3)	−2.6 (27.3)	9.8 (49.6)
Daily mean °C (°F)	−8.5 (16.7)	−2.9 (26.8)	−0.4 (31.3)	4.3 (39.7)	8.6 (47.5)	11.7 (53.1)	14.7 (58.5)	14.2 (57.6)	10.7 (51.3)	5.0 (41.0)	−2.0 (28.4)	−5.9 (21.4)	4.1 (39.4)
Mean daily minimum °C (°F)	−12.0 (10.4)	−7.6 (18.3)	−5.8 (21.6)	−1.6 (29.1)	1.3 (34.3)	4.5 (40.1)	6.6 (43.9)	6.5 (43.7)	3.4 (38.1)	−0.1 (31.8)	−5.3 (22.5)	−9.1 (15.6)	−1.6 (29.1)
Record low °C (°F)	−36.1 (−33.0)	−31.7 (−25.1)	−28.3 (−18.9)	−17.2 (1.0)	−8.9 (16.0)	−2.2 (28.0)	−1.7 (28.9)	−1.1 (30.0)	−5.6 (21.9)	−18.9 (−2.0)	−28.9 (−20.0)	−29.4 (−20.9)	−36.1 (−33.0)
Average precipitation mm (inches)	91.2 (3.59)	51.6 (2.03)	40.3 (1.59)	29.2 (1.15)	26.3 (1.04)	33.3 (1.31)	27.9 (1.10)	30.2 (1.19)	38.9 (1.53)	78.7 (3.10)	89.7 (3.53)	101.0 (3.98)	638.3 (25.14)
Average snowfall cm (inches)	80.8 (31.8)	34.1 (13.4)	25.3 (10.0)	10.4 (4.1)	2.7 (1.1)	0.0 (0.0)	0.0 (0.0)	0.0 (0.0)	7.3 (2.9)	9.8 (3.9)	45.7 (18.0)	55.2 (21.7)	271.3 (106.9)
Average precipitation days	11	7	7	6	6	7	5	7	7	10	11	11	95
Average snowy days	9	5	5	2	0	0	0	0	0	2	6	8	37
Source: Environment and Climate Change Canada

== See also ==
- Black Dome Mountain
- Ogden, British Columbia
- Railroad Pass (British Columbia)
