= Camelsfoot Range =

Mountain sub-range in British Columbia, Canada

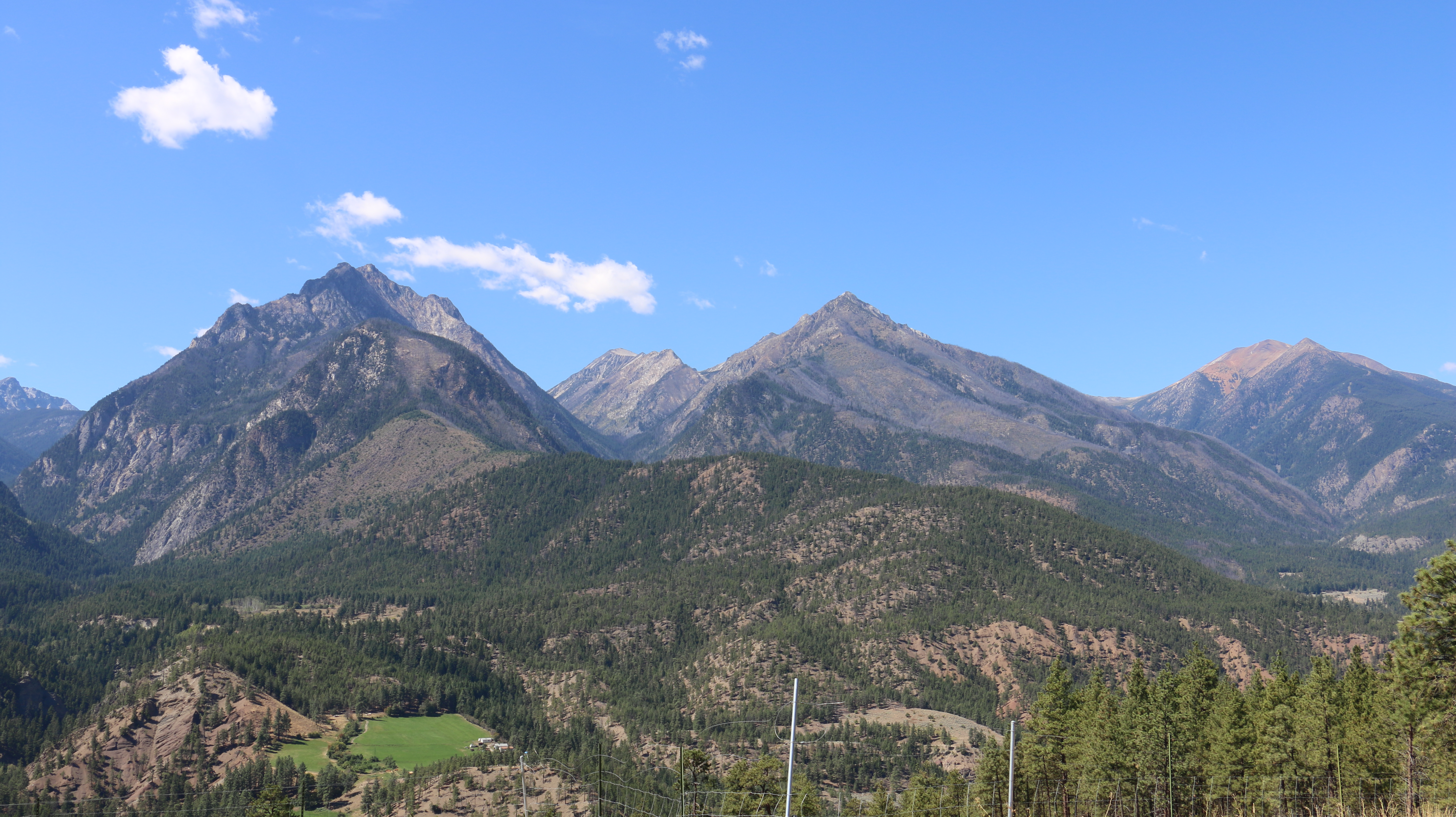
- Southern ridges in the Camelsfoot Range near the Fraser River

Highest point
- Peak: Red Mountain
- Elevation: 2,445 m (8,022 ft)
- Coordinates: 51°12′13″N 122°32′55″W

Dimensions
- Area: 2,390 km^{2} (920 mi^{2})

Geography
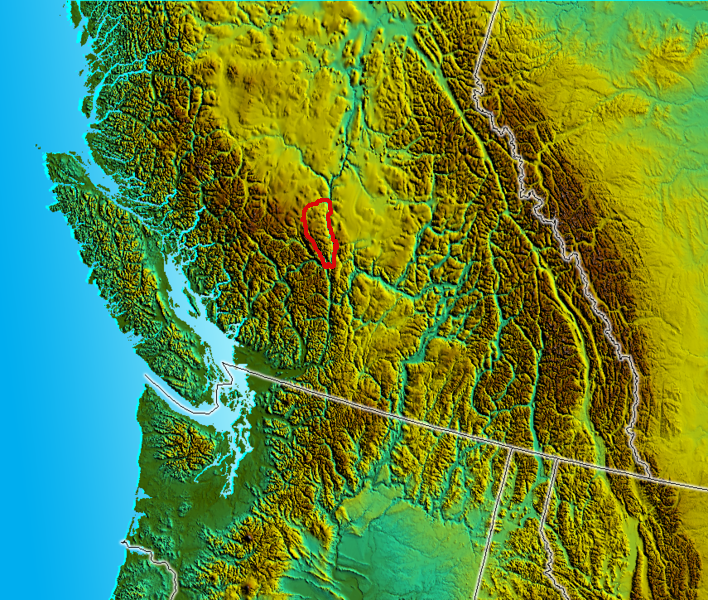
- Location map of Camelsfoot Range
- Country: Canada
- Province: British Columbia
- Parent range: Chilcotin Ranges and Fraser Plateau

The Camelsfoot Range is a sub-range of the Chilcotin Ranges subdivision of the Pacific Ranges of the Coast Mountains in British Columbia. The Fraser River forms its eastern boundary. The range is approximately 90 km at its maximum length and less than 30 km wide at its widest.

== Terrain and location ==
The far southeast end of the Camelsfoot is extremely rugged, and dropping to one last point at 7000'-plus before plunging into the gorge of the Fraser Canyon at Fountain, near Lillooet. For 45 km NW from there, the range is rocky and lightly forested with lodgepole pine, breaking into high benchlands and large creek basins draining through benchland country via small canyons.

Beyond that the range's terrain is much more gentle, with high, meadowed ridges running east towards the Fraser Canyon between treed plateaus and small canyons, and a few large, barren domes running further north along the Fraser. The range is bounded on the north and west by a large and impressive benchland-and-hoodoo sand canyon similar to those along the range's east flank - that of Churn Creek, which is a provincial protected area. The historic Empire Valley Ranch is near the mouth of Churn Creek and is provincially protected for heritage and environmental reasons. It is on a high side-valley above the Fraser Canyon; north of it beyond Churn Creek is the historically significant Gang Ranch.

== Camels in the Cariboo ==
Camelsfoot Peak and the range itself take their name from an odd episode in the story of the Fraser and Cariboo Gold Rushes. Frank Laumeister, a United States veteran of the Camel Corps, bought 23 camels from the US military, which was ending their use. He used the animals to carry freight on the Douglas Road and the Old Cariboo Road from Lillooet to Fort Alexandria, and later on the new Cariboo Wagon Road from Yale. After this, he finally discontinued using the camels. Horses could not stand their smell, the camels' soft feet were hurt by the rocky soils of the BC Interior and the canyon trails, and handlers found them difficult. Many escaped retirement into the wilds.

The last confirmed sighting was in the Ashcroft area in 1905, possibly 1910 by some claims. Barroom stories recount sightings elsewhere in the southern Interior into the 1930s, but these are taken with the same amount of stock as the Sasquatch or the Cariboo Alligator.

The original Log Cabin Theatre in Lillooet, still exists today, originally was used by Laumeister for a camel barn. No one knows if the camels roamed the Camelsfoot. The new highway bridge in Lillooet is named the Bridge of the Twenty-Three Camels to commemorate their role in local history.

The name of the Yalakom River is a simplified version of the Chilcotin word for the ewe of the mountain sheep. Shulaps, the name of the range to the west of the Camelsfoot, is a simplified version of the Chilcotin for the ram.

== Peaks ==
There have been copper prospects operating on Red Mountain 2445 m (8022 ft), the highest in the range, and on Poison Mountain 2264 m (7428 ft), just south Red, is located where the spine of the Shulaps Range intersects with that of the Camelsfoot, at the apex of the Yalakom valley which runs SE towards Lillooet from this point. Poison Mountain's name comes from the toxic leaching of its orebodies into local streams (and rumours of mercury in the copper ore) while Red's comes from the colour of its cuprous earth. Red's flanks show ziggurat-like scars that are evidence of the scale of ore-sampling that at one time was underway.

There are projected open-pit mine and smelter plans for the Poison Mountain-Red Mountain orebody, using power from the also projected Hat Creek lignite deposits nearby on the other side of the Fraser. These have never been brought forward in the public planning process, nor are they likely to be given the scope (and overlapping) of First Nations land claims in the immediate region.

Red has a twin summit, French Mountain 2231 m (7320 ft), originally named French Bar Mountain after a rich gold-bearing bar on the Fraser just east. North of them is a remote, gentle summit known as Black Dome Mountain 2252 m (7388 ft). China Head 2125 m (6972 ft) and Nine Mile Ridge 2422 m (7946 ft) are southeast of Red and are large, wide ridges covered in meadow; Nine Mile Ridge is a protected area. China Head's name is thought by some to have to do with a conical-shaped hill atop the ridge visible from the Fraser, but the name may have to do with long-established Lillooet entrepreneur Cheng Won, who owned a hog ranch on Leon Creek, another valley south and "Wo Hing General Store" in Lillooet. The term "head" in 19th-century frontier usage was a synonym for mountain or ridge or headland, and not meant as a reference to a head.

Due south of it is the isolated massif of Yalakom Mountain 2424 m (7953 ft), which is one of the highest in the range and remains a redoubt of mountain sheep and other big game, and historically was part of a long-standing wildlife preserve. East of Yalakom Mountain is Hogback Mountain 2149 m (7051 ft), whose name is not descriptive but concerns Cheng Won's hog ranch on its shoulders from which the pigs would run wild onto the mountain.

South of Hogback and Leon Creek the range becomes much more rugged as it narrows. Mount Birch 2232 m (7323 ft), just south of Leon Creek, is named after the Lieutenant-Governor who ran the Crown Colony of British Columbia for most of the alcoholic Frederick Seymour's term as governor. Birch has a twin summit on its short, sharp ridge - Mount Duncan 2182 m (7159 ft) and a southern foreshoulder overlooking the confluence of the Yalakom and Bridge Rivers is named Mount Bishop 1,721 m (5,646 ft). From Bishop south to the Fraser the boundary of the range is the very lower stretches of the Bridge River, after its confluence with the Yalakom. A rural farming and ranching community named Moha, also called Yalakom, is located around that confluence, which also is the lower end of the Big Canyon of the Bridge River.

Southeast from Duncan there is Slok Hill (Red Hill) 2081 m (6827 ft) which is a mountain despite its name, which is St'at'imcets for "red". The upper canyon of Applespring Creek nearly bisects the range to nearly connect top Slok Creek, south of which is Camelsfoot Peak 2014 m (6608 ft). Below Applespring Creek along the lower Bridge is the rancherie of the Bridge River Indian Band, Xwisten (which is the name of the river in their language). Their combined reserves extend much further up the Bridge on its south side, almost to Moha, and comprise one of the largest Indian reserves in British Columbia.

The southeastern shoulders of Camelsfoot Peak overlook the town of Lillooet. The confluence of the Bridge and Fraser Rivers is at the range's southern foot. Just upriver from it is a final unnamed pinnacle of the range, in a locality sometimes referred to as North Fountain (Fountain is south of the Fraser at this point), that is the site of an old forestry lookout, accessed by a decommissioned side road off the "main" road up the west side of the Fraser from Lillooet.

Ranches off that west side road, known as the Slok Creek Forest Service Road or, more traditionally, the West Pavilion Road, access ranches on high benchlands atop cliffs that plunge to one of the Fraser's deepest gorges, plunging in near-desert between Fountain and Big Bar. Although road-access today, these once were accessed only by cable ferry on the river far below Pavilion, or via tortuous horse trails over the southern Camelsfoot. Some of the ranchlands and spreads in this area, which is called Blue Ridge as well as West Pavilion, were part of the Diamond S Ranch holdings at Pavilion founded by American settler Robert Carson and owned in later years by the Martley family and their descendants to this day.

== Wildlife ==
The range is home to black bear, black-tail deer, moose, mountain sheep, mountain goat, cougar, lynx and smaller creatures. Encounters with grizzlies may occur in this range, but they are not so common here as in the Shulaps Range and west from there. Contrary to media myth there are no rattlesnakes in the Lillooet region, nor west of the Fraser at all except a few near Lytton and Boston Bar. There are, however, many species of lizard and non-venomous snake.

== Access ==
All of these summits and many other high areas of the range and other nearby ranges are accessible by 4x4 (preferably with a winch) or mountain bike or horseback. The main roads encircle the range via the Yalakom and Fraser Rivers, converging via China Head and northeast via Watson Bar and Big Bar Ferry.

== Geographic classification issue ==
In some classifications, they are a parallel region to the Pacific Ranges rather than its subdivisions, and in others they are part of the Chilcotin Plateau. That is to say, part of the Interior Plateau, along with the Marble Range and Clear Range on the other side of the Fraser River from it. In such a classification system, the boundary of the Chilcotin Ranges would stop at the Yalakom River, the North Fork of the Bridge River, which is the western boundary of the Camelsfoot.

On the other hand, those ranges, classified as part of the Interior Plateau, are really part of the same geologic system as the Coast Mountains across the Fraser or the Cascade Range south of the Thompson on the near side of the Fraser, which has been riven by the gorges of the Thompson and Fraser Canyons to separate the Pacific Cordillera into different ranges.

The Camelsfoot Range is crammed into the division point of the huge Fraser and Yalakom Faults, which converge south of Lillooet at the south end of Fountain Ridge, and compositionally is more similar to the Marble and Clear Ranges than to the Shulaps Range, which is to the west across the Yalakom.
