= Dog Creek (Fraser River tributary) =

River in British Columbia, Canada

Coordinates: 51°34′56″N 122°17′37″W

Dog Creek is a tributary of the Fraser River in the Cariboo region of the Canadian province of British Columbia, entering that river south of the confluence of the Chilcotin River. The eponymous community of Dog Creek is located on the northeast side of the creek's confluence with the Fraser.

== See also ==
- List of rivers of British Columbia
