= Chilcotin Plateau =

Region of the Fraser Plateau in British Columbia, Canada

- Plateau
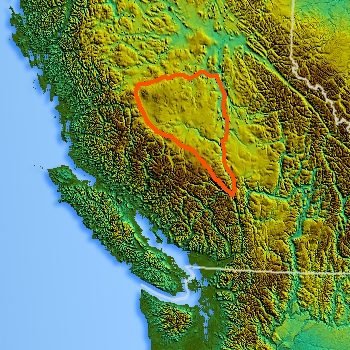
- Location of the Chilcotin Plateau
- Coordinates: 52°10′00″N 123°25′00″W
- Location: British Columbia, Canada
- Part of: Fraser Plateau
- Geology: Flood basalt

The Chilcotin Plateau is part of the Fraser Plateau, a major subdivision of the Interior Plateau of British Columbia. The Chilcotin Plateau is physically near-identical with the region of the same name, i.e. "the Chilcotin", which lies between the Fraser River and the southern Coast Mountains and is defined by the basin of the Chilcotin River and so includes montane areas beyond the plateau. East of the Chilcotin Plateau, across the Fraser River, is the Cariboo Plateau, while to the north beyond the West Road (Blackwater) River is the Nechako Plateau. West and south of the Chilcotin Plateau are various subdivisions of the Coast Mountains, including the Chilcotin Ranges which lie along the plateau's southwest.

Included within the definition of the Chilcotin Plateau are the Rainbow Range, near Bella Coola and the similarly volcanic Ilgachuz Range and Itcha Range both of which are major shield volcanoes. The Camelsfoot Range, north of Lillooet, is included in the Chilcotin Plateau by some systems of classification.

The plateau is nearly entirely drained by the Chilcotin River and its tributaries, the largest of which are the Chilanko and Chilko Rivers. Also draining the plateau on its eastern edge is Churn Creek, which forms the east flank of the Camelsfoot Range and enters the Fraser directly. On the west side of the plateau, the basins of the Dean, Homathko and Atnarko Rivers penetrate the massifs of the Coast Mountains and have their beginnings, or the early part of their courses, on the Chilcotin Plateau.

The Chilcotin Plateau consists of basaltic lava of the Chilcotin Group, a group of related volcanic rocks that is nearly parallel with the Fraser Plateau. It extends along the adjacent Garibaldi Volcanic Belt in the Coast Mountains. Volcanism of the Chilcotin Plateau is considered to be related to back-arc basin crustal extension behind the coastal Cascadia subduction zone.

== See also ==
- Tsilhqot'in Nation
- British Columbia Highway 20
- Cascadia Subduction Zone
- Nechako Plateau
- Fraser River
- Chilcotin River
- Chilanko River
- Taseko River
