= Big Creek Provincial Park =

British Columbia Provincial Park

- IUCN category II (national park)
- Location within British Columbia
- Interactive map of Big Creek Provincial Park
- Location: Lillooet Land District, British Columbia, Canada
- Nearest city: Williams Lake, BC
- Coordinates: 51°10′59″N 123°06′59″W
- Area: 67,918 ha (167,830 acres)
- Established: July 13, 1995
- Governing body: BC Parks

Big Creek Provincial Park is a provincial park in British Columbia, Canada.

== Location ==
It is adjoined on the south by the Spruce Lake Protected Area (a.k.a. the South Chilcotin or Southern Chilcotins, though in the Bridge River Country) and on the west by Tsʼilʔos Provincial Park. Neighbouring on the east is the Churn Creek Protected Area.

== History ==
The park was established in 1995 and expanded in 2000, 2001, and 2004 to total approximately 67,918 hectares.
