= Hurley River =

River in British Columbia, Canada

Coordinates: 50°51′00″N 122°51′00″W

The Hurley River is a major tributary of the Bridge River of west-central British Columbia that was earlier known as the South Fork of that larger river. It was for a while known as "Hamilton's River" after Danny Hamilton, an American who was among the first to settle in the goldfields region of the upper Bridge River. By the 1920s that name was changed to the Hurley River, commemorating one of the main pioneers of the Lillooet Country, Dan Hurley.

The Hurley begins near Mount Thiassi and flows through a marshy upper valley eastwards before turning north just west of the famous gold-mining town of Bralorne. From that point the river goes over semi-hidden Hurley Falls into the Hurley Canyon, which makes up ten of the last twelve miles of the river before its confluence with the Bridge River near Gold Bridge, just below Lajoie Dam. An operating placer mine at the outlet of the canyon goes by the name South Fork, alluding to the river's older name.

The Hurley has given its name to a famous B.C. backroad between Gold Bridge and Pemberton - the Hurley Main. A "main" is a logging main, that is to say a major trunk road for a network of logging roads. The route of the Hurley Main uses a defile known as Railroad Pass near the head of that river to emerge high above the Lillooet River, to which a steep, switchbacking descent must be made. Railroad Pass gets its name from its consideration as a possible railway route between the Coast and the Interior during the initial surveys for the Canadian Pacific Railway in the 1870s, and again during the heyday of railway speculation in British Columbia in the 1890s-1910s.

== See also ==
- List of rivers of British Columbia
