= Churn Creek Protected Area =

Provincial park in British Columbia, Canada

- IUCN category VI (protected area with sustainable use of natural resources)
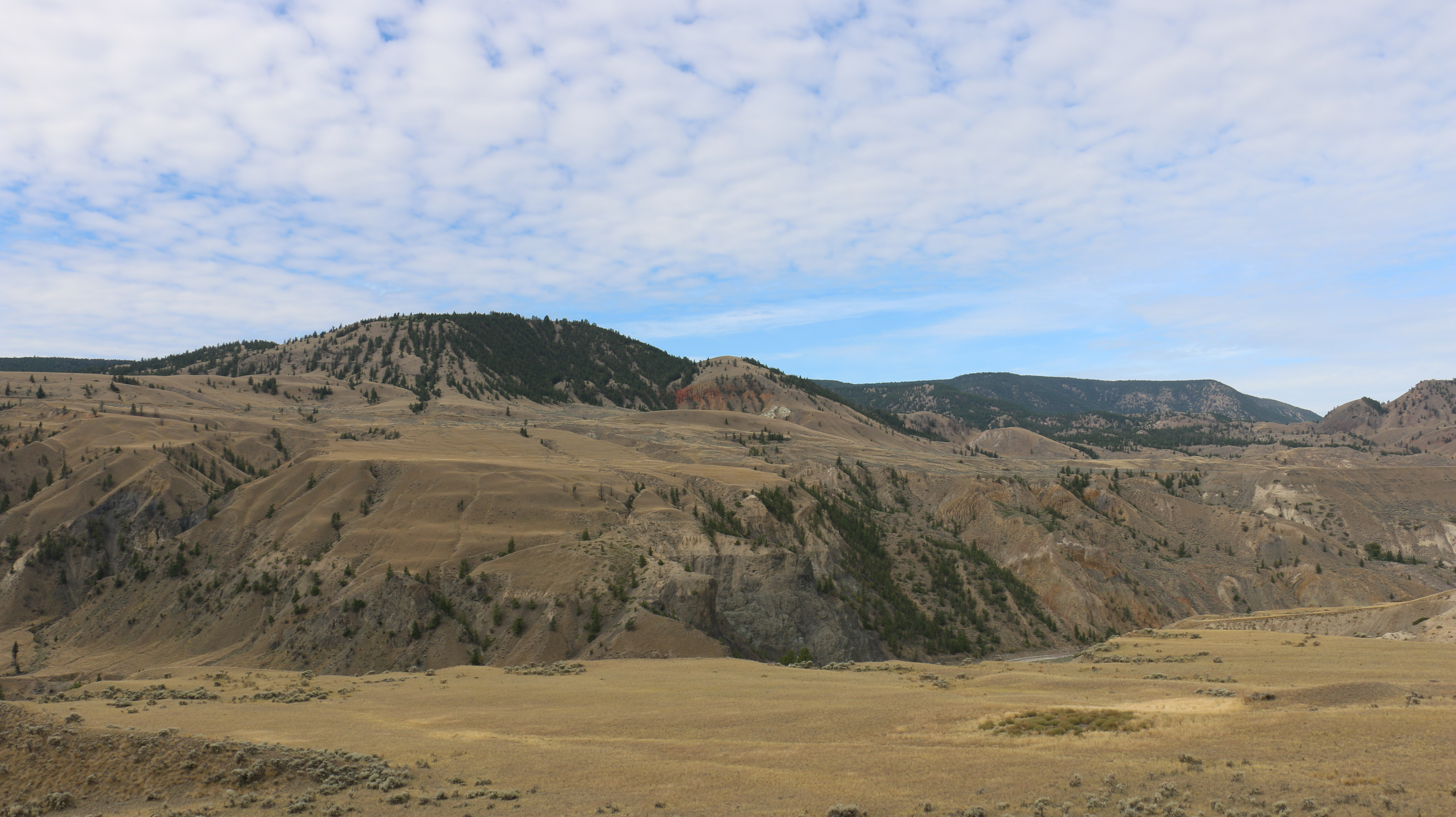

- Location within British Columbia
- Interactive map of Churn Creek Protected Area
- Location: British Columbia, Canada
- Coordinates: 51°29′45″N 122°30′27″W
- Area: 36,747 ha (90,800 acres)
- Established: 1995
- Governing body: BC Parks
- Website: BC Parks Churn

The Churn Creek Protected Area is a 36,747-hectare (90,800-acre) provincial protected area in British Columbia, Canada. It is a mix of dryland canyon and steppe and adjoining rangeland flanking the canyon of Churn Creek and that stream's confluence with the Fraser River at the northern apex of the Camelsfoot Range. The historic Gang Ranch is just north of the Churn Creek Protected Area. The Empire Valley Ranch ecological preserve was added to the Protected Area in an expansion.

== Geography ==
The protected area is located in the southwestern area of the province of British Columbia, in the Cariboo region, on the southern edge of the Chilcotin Plateau. It encompasses most of the drainage area of Churn Creek, and its eastern boundary is the Fraser River. The southern portion of the park includes a large expanse of the western bank of the Fraser, including the lower parts of the drainages of Grinder and Lone Cabin creeks. It also includes several small lakes. The terrain is deeply cut by rivers and creeks into canyons and benchlands, and the Camelsfoot Range rises to more than 1,500 meters (4,900 ft) in the western extreme of the park. The Churn Creek canyon contains erosional features, such as pillars and hoodoos.

== History ==
The Churn Creek area has been home to Tsilhqot'in and Secwepemc First Nations people for at least 7000 years. After the discovery of gold in the Cariboo region in the mid-1800s, Europeans moved into the area. They brought with them the smallpox virus to which the First Nations people had no resistance. The population of the Tcexwe'ptem band in the Empire Valley was drastically reduced by smallpox in the 1860s, with the survivors joining the Canoe and Dog Creek bands to the east. Ranching became an important industry in the region; two large ranches, the Empire Valley and the Gang were formed around Churn Creek in the latter part of the 19th century.

=== Conservation history ===
Parks Canada identified the Churn Creek area as a potential park due to its populations of bighorn sheep and other mammals, but opposition from local ranchers stopped the formation of a National Park. After the Province of British Columbia completed an assessment of environmental resources in the Cariboo region in the 1990s, the area was again looked at as a potential park. The province compromised with ranchers by designating certain areas within the park as grazing land for cattle. Churn Creek Protected Area was officially named in 1995, and expanded in 1997 with the addition of the former Empire Valley ranch to the park. It is one of five parks in the province to protect grasslands areas.

== Ecology ==
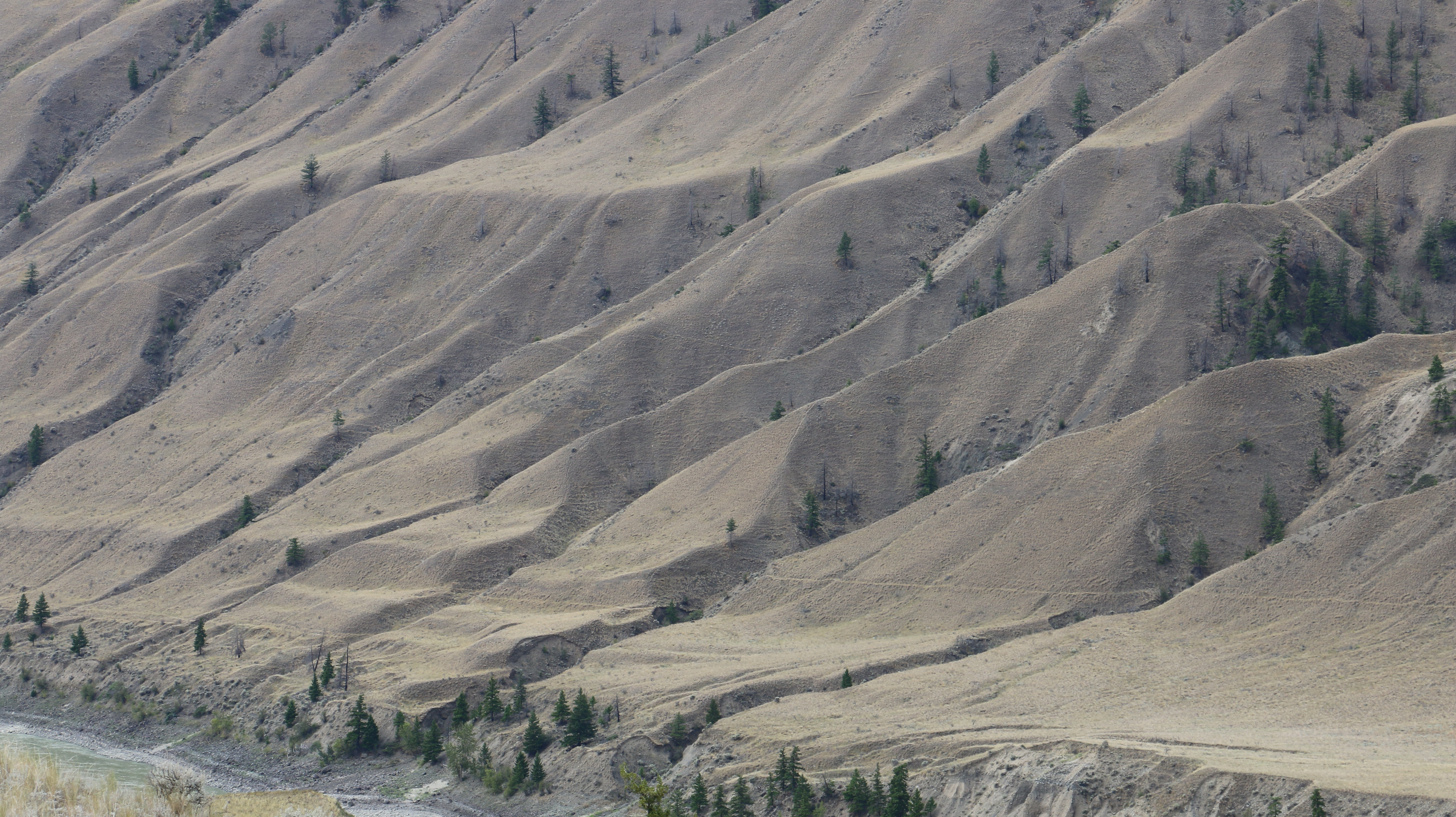
Grassland benches above the Fraser River in the park

=== Flora ===
In the lower reaches of the grasslands, bluebunch wheatgrass dominates the grass species, with big sagebrush appearing in clumps. Lichens and mosses are very common, covering up to eighty percent of the ground surface under and around the vascular plants. At higher elevations, the Interior Douglas fir begins to cover much of the land area. Deciduous trees such as aspen and poplar are present in copses and near the rivers, creeks, and lakes.

=== Fauna ===
Several herds of bighorn sheep live in the park, with some spending the whole year in the park, and some migrating into nearby alpine areas in the summer. Mule deer are also present. The grassland environment is home to birds, bats, small rodents, and reptile species. Bird species include the Brewer's sparrow, Lewis's woodpecker, long-billed curlew, gyrfalcon, short-eared owl, and prairie falcon. Bats include the Western small-footed myotis, and reptiles include the rubber boa and the gopher snake. The forests contain flammulated owl, Townsend's big-eared bat, and sharp-tailed grouse.

== See also ==
- List of historic ranches in British Columbia
