= Yalakom River =

Tributary of the Bridge River in Canada

Coordinates: 50°51′48″N 122°10′20″W

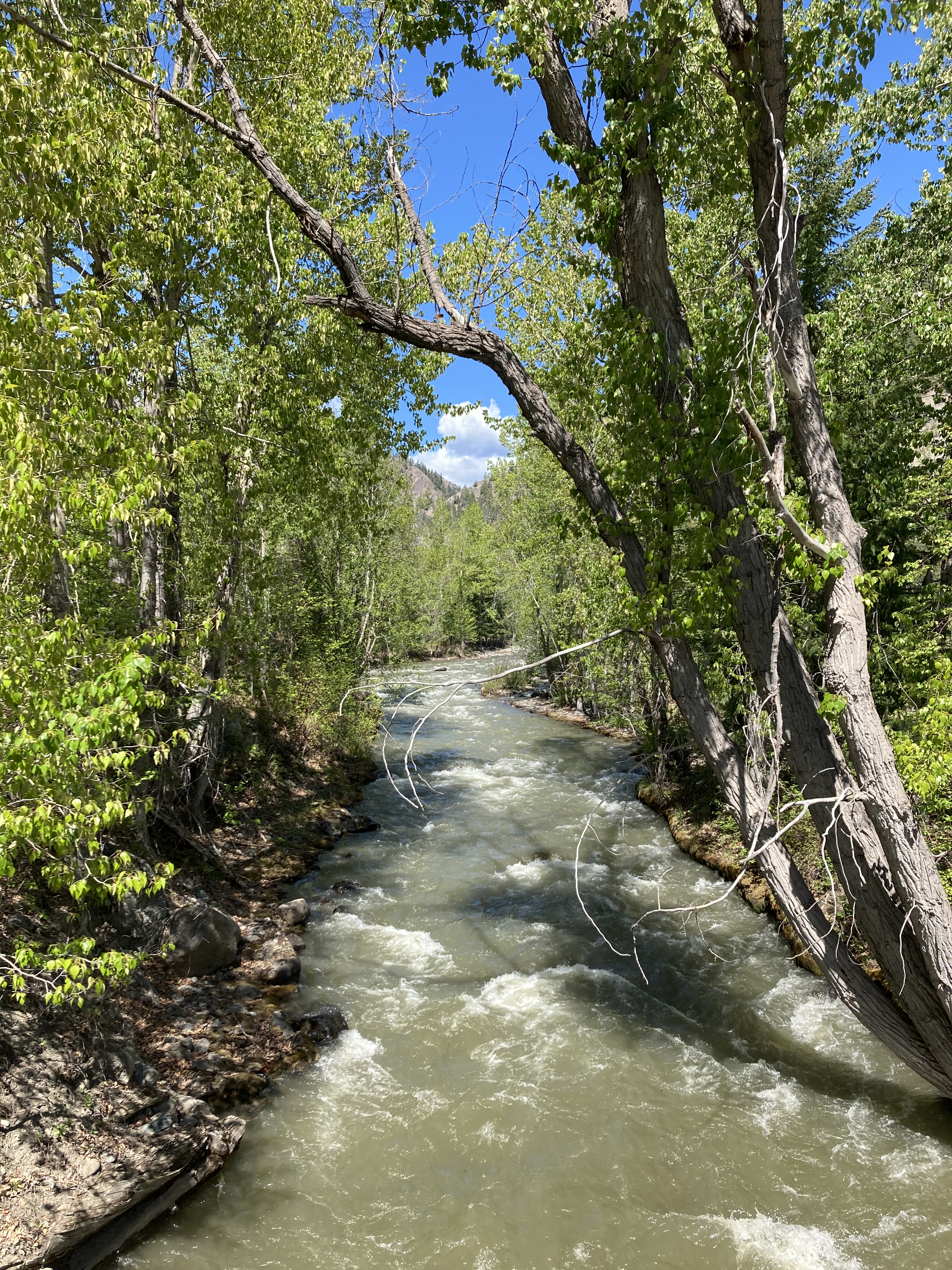

Physical characteristics
- Mouth: Bridge River
- Length: 56 km (35 mi)
- Discharge
  - maximum: 12 m^{3}/s (420 cu ft/s)

The Yalakom River is a tributary of the Bridge River, which is one of the principal tributaries of the Fraser River, entering it near the town of Lillooet, British Columbia. In frontier times it was also known as the North Fork of the Bridge River, and joins the Bridge River proper at Moha, a rural community with a history in ranching, farming and mining. The river is approximately 56 kilometres (35 mi) in length. The valley's climate is semi-arid in character and lodgepole pine predominates below treeline.

The name Yalakom comes from the Statimc language word for the ewe of the mountain sheep and is also applied to one of the major peaks of the Camelsfoot Range, which rises along the east bank of the Yalakom. West of the river is the Shulaps Range, which is similarly named for the ram of the mountain sheep in Statimc. The upper part of the valley's east bank, in the area of Yalakom Mountain, is protected within Yalakom Provincial Park.

The rural farming and ranching community of Moha is located at the confluence of the Yalakom and Bridge Rivers, at the mouth of the Big Canyon of the latter river. Copper prospects at Poison Mountain and Red Mountain at the head of the valley remain undeveloped, although there is a major reactivated gold claim on the flanks of Big Dog Mountain to their southwest at the head of the Shulaps Range.

== See also ==
- List of rivers of British Columbia
