= Spruce Lake Protected Area =

Protected natural area in British Columbia, Canada

Coordinates: 51°03′50″N 123°02′08″W

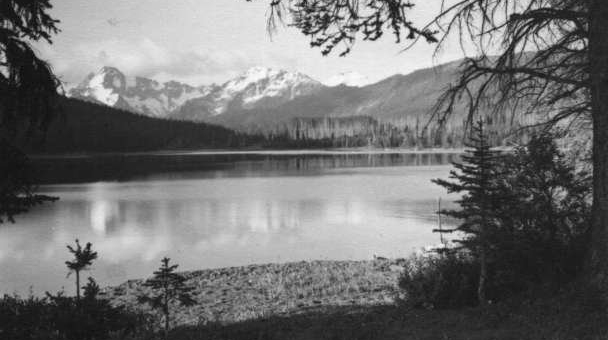
Spruce Lake in the 1950s, Dickson Range in background, E. Cleven Photo

The Spruce Lake Protected Area, formerly known variously as the Southern Chilcotin Mountains Provincial Park, Southern Chilcotins, and also as South Chilcotin Provincial Park, is a 71,347-hectare Protected Area in the British Columbia provincial parks system, approximately 200 km north of Vancouver. The area had been the subject of an ongoing preservationist controversy since the 1930s. In 2007, its status as a provincial park was downgraded to protected area.

Recreational activities in the park included hiking, cycling, swimming, fishing and hunting, and there were walk-in wilderness camping sites. Wildlife in the protected area include grizzly bear, California bighorn sheep and wolverine.

In June 2010, Bill 15 created the South Chilcotin Mountains Park, a "Class A" park of 56,796 hectares, from Spruce Lake Protected Area. The remaining approximately 14,550 hectares were set aside for tourism and mining, but commercial logging is still prohibited. The bill also confirmed the implementation of the 2004 decision for mining/tourism zones in the Lillooet Land and Resource Management Plan area.

== Background ==
The area was designated as a protected area by the British Columbia provincial government in 2001, and then established as a Provincial Park by then-Minister of Water, Land and Air Protection Joyce Murray in 2004, with the new park's boundaries including 70% of the protected area and permitting limited resource extraction in the remaining area on the protected area's periphery.

The protected area designation resulted from the Lillooet Land and Resource Management Plan (LRMP), which attempted to address local community, environmental, recreation and resource interests. Even though it is not in the Chilcotin District proper, the area has been called the "South Chilcotins" since about 1980, when a group of conservationists started to promote the area for protection as a park. The South Chilcotin name is derived from its geographic position in the Chilcotin Ranges, into the Bridge River Country where the park is located. Bert Brink, one of British Columbia's most renowned naturalists, advocated for the conservation of this area for over sixty years and lived to see it become a park before he died in 2007.

== Location and topography ==
The protected area was located on the inland lee of the Pacific Ranges of the Coast Mountains, on the north flank of the Bridge River Country and the Chilcotin Country to the north. It adjoined Big Creek Provincial Park and Tsʼilʔos Provincial Park, which bordered it on the north and northwest, respectively. Part of the larger subrange of the Pacific Ranges known as the Chilcotin Ranges, the area was partially protected in the 1990s after 60 years of debate and controversy.

== First Nations history ==
Historically this region was the hunting territory of Chief Hunter Jack of the Lakes Lillooet, whose big-game hunting business shared the region with hunters of the Tsilhqot'in people. The shared use of the area north of the Bridge River and Gun Creek was part of the settlement of an early 19th-century peace which had ended a long and bloody war between Hunter Jack's people and the Tsilhqot'in.

Trails from the Bridge River Country led over the region to Taseko Lake and Chilko Lake in the Chilcotin Country, and also east across the Camelsfoot Range to the Fraser River near Big Bar.

== Controversy ==
The area was the object of a protracted quarrel between preservationists and resource development which first began in the 1930s when prospectors and guide-outfitters dedicated to its natural beauty proposed it for preservation status. Charlie Cunningham, whose career as a wildlife filmmaker began in this area, was a driving force in the original movement for preservation. The Charlie Cunningham Wilderness proposal was revised in the 1970s as the Spruce Lake-Eldorado park proposal, and also as the Spruce Lake Management Planning Unit, but as land-use plans impinged on the proposed park area these names were abandoned.

The area's unique and distinct landscape and ecology, different from the rest of the Chilcotin Ranges or the Bridge River Country, made it stand out for protection amid a region already wild and extremely beautiful before logging and hydroelectric development transformed the valley to the south.

Many environmentalists hope that the creation of Tsʼilʔos and Big Creek Provincial Parks will help shore up the protection of the South Chilcotin Provincial Park which remained vulnerable to government review. Hunting guide Ted (Chilco) Choate of Gaspard Lake, on the Chilcotin Plateau, has joined in the call to combine all three parks, plus the Churn Creek Protected Area to the northeast, as well as some of the surrounding country and the deep, much higher heart of the Pacific Ranges, into a National Park. Industry and government remain publicly committed to shared use and sustainable planning.
