= Bridge River Country =

Region of British Columbia, Canada

Coordinates: 50.49°N 122.46°W

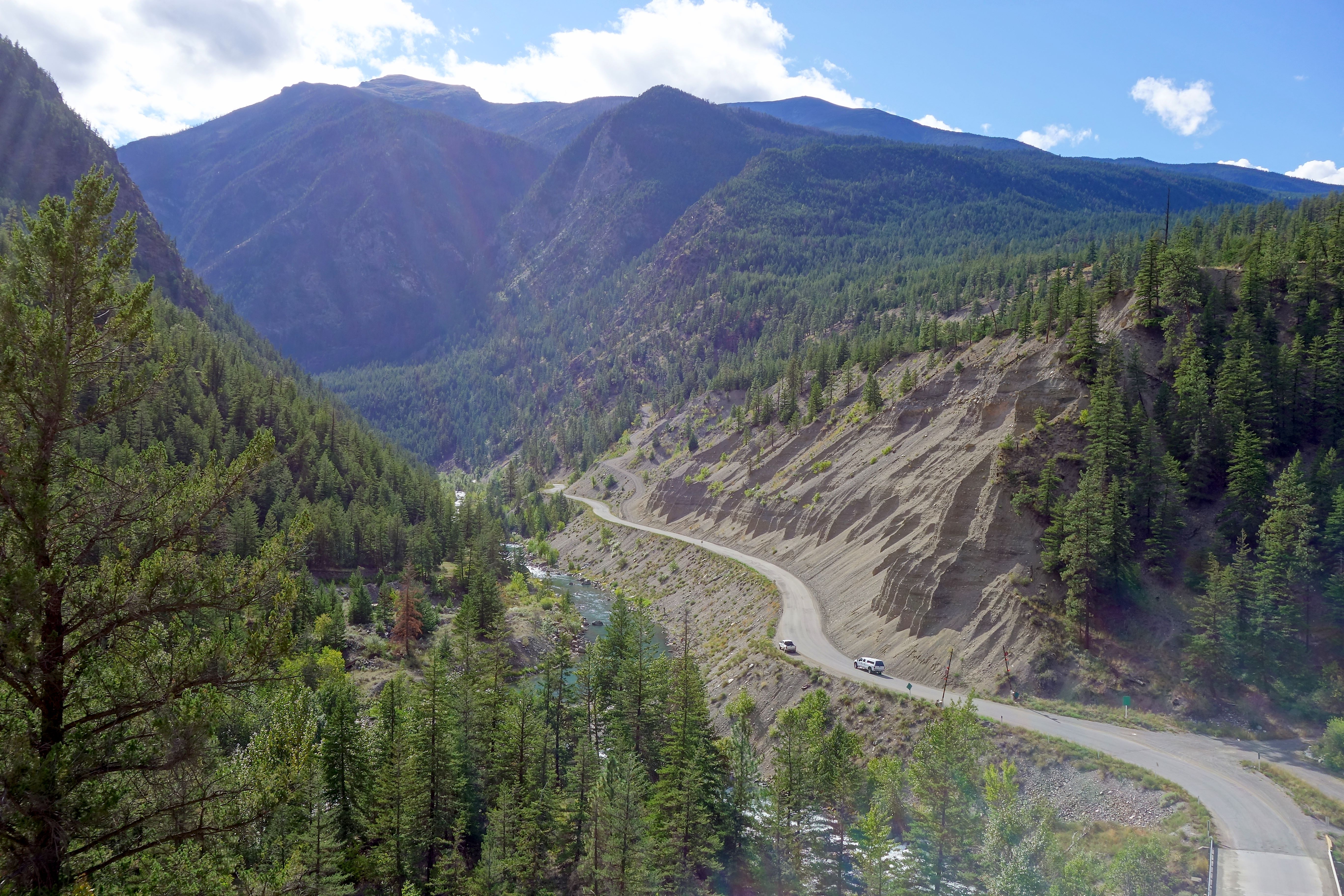
Bridge River Valley

The Bridge River Country is a historic geographic region and mining district in the Interior of British Columbia, Canada, lying between the Fraser Canyon and the valley of the Lillooet River, south of the Chilcotin Plateau and north of the Lillooet Ranges. "The Bridge River" can mean the Bridge River Country as opposed to the Bridge River itself, and is considered to be part of the Lillooet Country, but has a distinct history and identity within the larger region. As Lillooet is sometimes considered to be the southwest limit of the Cariboo, some efforts were made to refer to the Bridge River as the "West Cariboo" but this never caught on.

Though essentially consisting of the basin of the Bridge River and its tributaries, the Bridge River Country includes the communities of D'Arcy, McGillivray Falls, Seton Portage and Shalalth, which lie in the valley of Seton and Anderson Lakes and the Gates River just to the south, are also considered to be part of the Bridge River Country, and also simultaneously of the Lillooet Country. After the 1930s, the term "Bridge River-Lillooet" came into currency as a result of the chosen masthead of the fledgling Bridge River-Lillooet News, which served the town and environs of Lillooet as well as the mining towns of the upper Bridge River.

== See also ==
- Bridge River
- Bridge River, British Columbia
- Bridge River Power Project
- Lillooet Country
- Chilcotin District
- Cariboo
- Thompson Country
- Spruce Lake Protected Area
