= Keatley =

Keatley may refer to:

== People ==
- Charlotte Keatley (born 1960), English playwright
- Gina Keatley CDN, American nutritionist, media personality, and television host
- Greg Keatley (born 1953), former Major League Baseball catcher who played for one season
- Ian Keatley (born 1987), Irish rugby union player
- John H. Keatley (1838–1905), American newspaper editor, politician, and judge
- Zilpha Keatley Snyder (1927–2014), American author of books for children and young adults

== Geography ==
- Keatley, Saskatchewan, unincorporated community in Douglas Rural Municipality No. 436, Saskatchewan, Canada
- Keatley Creek, left tributary of the Fraser River in the Interior of British Columbia, Canada
- Keatley Creek Archaeological Site, in the interior of British Columbia and in the traditional territory of the St'at'imc people

== See also ==
- Keathley
- Keighley
- Ketley
