= Bin Sangyeo Nori =

"Bin Sangyeo Nori" (Korean: 빈상여놀이) refers to performances by the lead vocalist of the funeral songs called "Apsorikkun" and a group of pallbearers or "Sangdukkun". "Apsorikkun" sings the first part of the song while others sing the chorus. At the night before, it happens in order to familiarize themselves with carrying the coffin properly during the morning ceremony. The name originates from three words: "빈" meaning "empty", "상여" meaning "bier" and "놀이" meaning "entertainment.

== The Process ==
Once the coffin room is prepared and "Seongbokje" or a rite performed prior to the funeral is completed, the host family arranges a table of various types of food for the deceased person during the morning as well as night while welcoming the mourners. The funeral might continue for two or three or seven days, the most common length being three days. The day before the actual burial is referred to as "Deuneun Nal" when the mourners console the chief mourner or "Sangoo", burn incense and bow twice before the deceased- a ritual called "Bunhyangjaebae". "Bin Sangyeo Nori" is particularly significant for the "Hosang"- the funeral rites for the wealthy or elderly people who died a peaceful death. The night before the burial, during an event referred to as "Daedotum", Sangdukkuns perform the "빈 상여놀이" by carrying the empty casket and singing "Sangyeotsori". It is generally performed by the young adult males from the particular village and each of them is included in this carrying out process either in the mourning-house yard or the street in front of that house.

=== Sangdukkun ===
The "Sangdukkun" refers to a person who carries a funeral bier. In masked dance dramas they carry the funeral bier of Halmi (old woman) or of the provincial governor in traditional puppet plays. The Sangdukkun also include people who perform apsori (front singing) without actually carrying the bier. There are minor differences among dramas. In "Suyoung Yaryu", sanbaji, without a mask appear wearing a white jacket and pants, haenggeon (hood worn by the mourning family), straw shoes and a peaked hat. When Halmi collapses after being beaten by Yeonggam and cannot be revived even with acupuncture, Buddhist scriptures are read to her in a final effort. After the death of Halmi is declared, the sangdukkun are called in. They chant Buddhist sutras while they walk around carrying the bier and then exit. In "Dongnae Yaryu", the sangdukkun wear the same costume as in "Suyeong Yaryu", but without the haenggeon. After Halmi dies, six bier bearers appear, wrap her body in a white cloth and take it away. After that about ten bier bearers come back, sadly singing the funeral dirge (sangyeosori) while circling the scene once more, and then exit. The "Dongnae Yaryu", "Tongyeong Ogwangdae" and "Goseong Ogwangdae", also differ from one another.

== The song or The Bawijeol Maeul ==
The "Bawijeol Maeul Hosang Nori" is a custom where a seonsorikkun (a lead singer) and sangyeokkuns (people holding a casket) sing a song called Sangyeotsori in the night before a funeral. It is not performed at every funeral but solely for those who have lived a life of longevity and happiness. The custom is meant to strengthen the cooperation between sangyeokkuns through singing and marching. The buk (drums), janggu (double-headed drums with a narrow waist in the middle), and kkwaenggwari (small gongs) are played while they carry around an empty casket. Sangyeokkuns also perform humorous acts, such as sobbing, mimicking mourners, and pretending to hold a memorial service while making quips during the ceremony. This custom was passed down primarily among the Moon Clan, who lived in Amsa-dong of Gangdong-gu until the town was incorporated into Seoul in 1963.

== Role of Food and Drink ==
Food and drinks play a significant role in the ritual of "Bin Sangyeo Nori". Since the rite happens throughout the night, the host of the funeral set up a table filled with various kinds of food and drinks in the yard. Red bean porridge, chicken soup, "Kkojitteok" or a type of Korean rice cake, spicy beef soup or "Yukgaejang", tofu, cooked vegetables, fish dishes seasoned with vinegar, "Kodari" or steamed fish, traditional Korean cookie called "Yumilgwa", chestnut, prune are some of the most common food items in addition to wine and some other local liquor. The red colour of beef soup or porridge symbolizes the power to defeat the lurking evil spirits and "tteok" acts as a mediator between the human world and the heavenly world. Sangdukkuns attempt at lightening the grave atmosphere by making the family members of the deceased laugh. They do such through various means such as, requesting for more food, giving a ride to a son-in-law from the Sangju family.

== The Role of Singing, Dancing and Merry-making ==
"Bin Sangyeo Nori" is conducted to pay respect to the deceased person. It can be referred to as an act of respect towards the deceased who raised the family. In addition to the Sandukkuns, the host invites the elder people of the village also. Along with singing, the performers also dance while carrying the bier. Since the lyrics are sad, the act of merry-making together is supposed to redeem the sadness in an empathetic way. Apsorikkun sings on the ground first and then climb up on the bier. While singing the chorus, Sandukkuns extend their arms to their sides, raise them and fold them again. The performers are not supposed to dress as the same as the Sangju. They borrow one from the neighbours and imitate the crying. Sometimes, one of them wears a skirt made out of hemp cloth, to pretend as the wife of the chief mourner. The friends of Sangju, offers alcohol to him and drag him for a dance. Someone then takes away the bandana and cane from the Sangju, puts them on and then while walking around inside the casket room, goes on expressing his disgust at how small the room is and finally falls out from it. The entire episode of farcical humour and merry making is to reduce the sadness caused by death and celebrate the life over the dead.

== Significance of "Bin Sangyeo Nori" ==
"Bin Sangyeo Nori" is performed in order to relax the chief mourner. Participating in their activities tend to relax him and sooth the sadness. Along with carrying the bier, the ritual also teaches the people involved to be patient and prepares themselves for the entire ordeal.
