= Texas Creek (Fraser River tributary) =

Coordinates: 50°33′57″N 121°48′23″W

Texas Creek is a medium-sized right tributary of the Fraser River in the Fraser Canyon region of that river's course, located approximately 16 miles down the river from the town of Lillooet. Texas Creek is also the name of the rural neighbourhood in the area of the creek, and also that of the Texas Creek Ranch which is one of the larger holdings.

== Course ==
The creek's course is very mountainous, rising in the higher basins of the northeastern Lillooet Ranges and plunging through a steep canyon for most of its course, broken only by flanking benchlands at the bottom of the mountains, which is the location of the rural community in this area. The upper canyon is wide enough to allow road construction, and logging roads lead to the highest basins with mining roads and hunting trails leading over the range into the Stein River basin wilderness and along ridges to other high summits of the Lillooet Ranges north and south.

The community is a satellite community of Lillooet, and its residents are represented in local governance as part of Electoral Area 'B' of the Squamish-Lillooet Regional District.

== History ==
The creek is in St'at'imc territory, and some Indian reserves are in the immediate area, generally those of the T'it'q'et First Nation or, southwards, of Nlaka'pamux bands. Though no legends recounting the events remain, the site is important in St'at'imc pre-history as being the location of a massive landslide, which backed the Fraser up for a hundred miles and more. The lake created by that event sustained a large quiggly hole village near Keatley Creek, about 30 miles upstream in the Glen Fraser area and significantly higher in elevation than the town of Lillooet (the site of which would have been underwater in those times), and is believed to have expired when the natural dam causing the lake finally gave way, with the last known occupancy of that village around 1000 A.D.
