= Pit-house =

Type of earth shelter with ancient origins

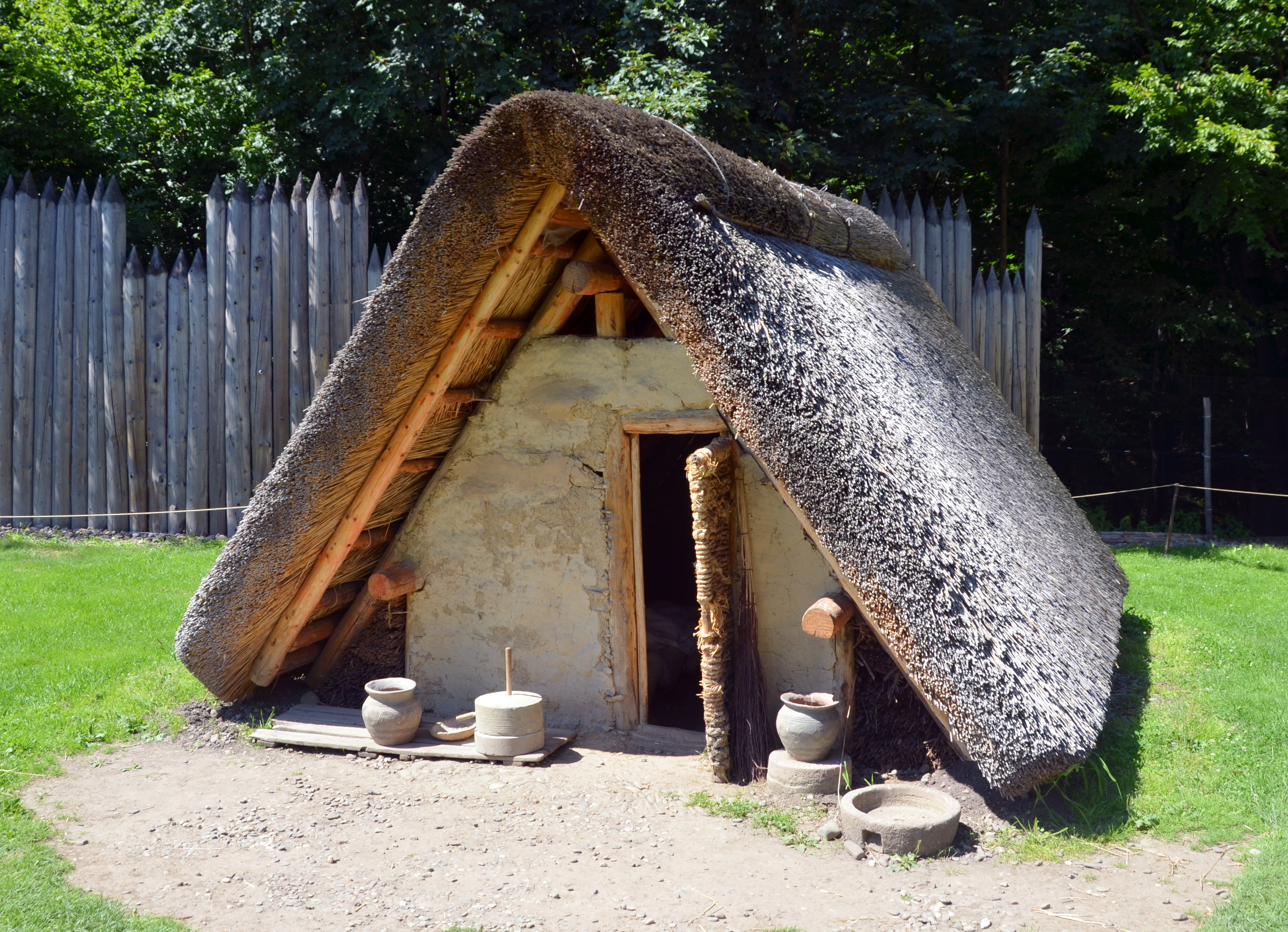
Reconstruction of a pit-house in Chotěbuz, Czechia

A pit house is a house built in the ground. Besides providing shelter from the most extreme of weather conditions, this type of earth shelter may also be used to store food (just like a pantry, a larder, or a root cellar) and for cultural activities like the telling of stories, dancing, singing and celebrations. General dictionaries also describe a pit-house as a dugout, and it has similarities to a half-dugout.

In archaeology, a pit-house is frequently called a sunken-featured building and occasionally (grub-) hut or grubhouse, after the German name Grubenhaus. They are found in numerous cultures around the world, including the people of the Southwestern United States, the ancestral Pueblo, the ancient Fremont and Mogollon cultures, the Cherokee, the Inuit, the people of the Plateau, and archaic residents of Wyoming (Smith 2003) in North America; Archaic residents of the Lake Titicaca Basin (Craig 2005) in South America; in Europe; and the Jōmon people in Japan. Some pit-houses may have not been dwellings, but served other purposes.

Usually, all that remains of the ancient pit-house is a dug-out hollow in the ground and any postholes used to support the roof. In the nineteenth century, it was believed that most prehistoric peoples lived in pit-houses, although it has since been proved that many of the features thought of as houses were in fact prehistoric food storage pits or served another purpose.

== Mammoth bone dwellings ==
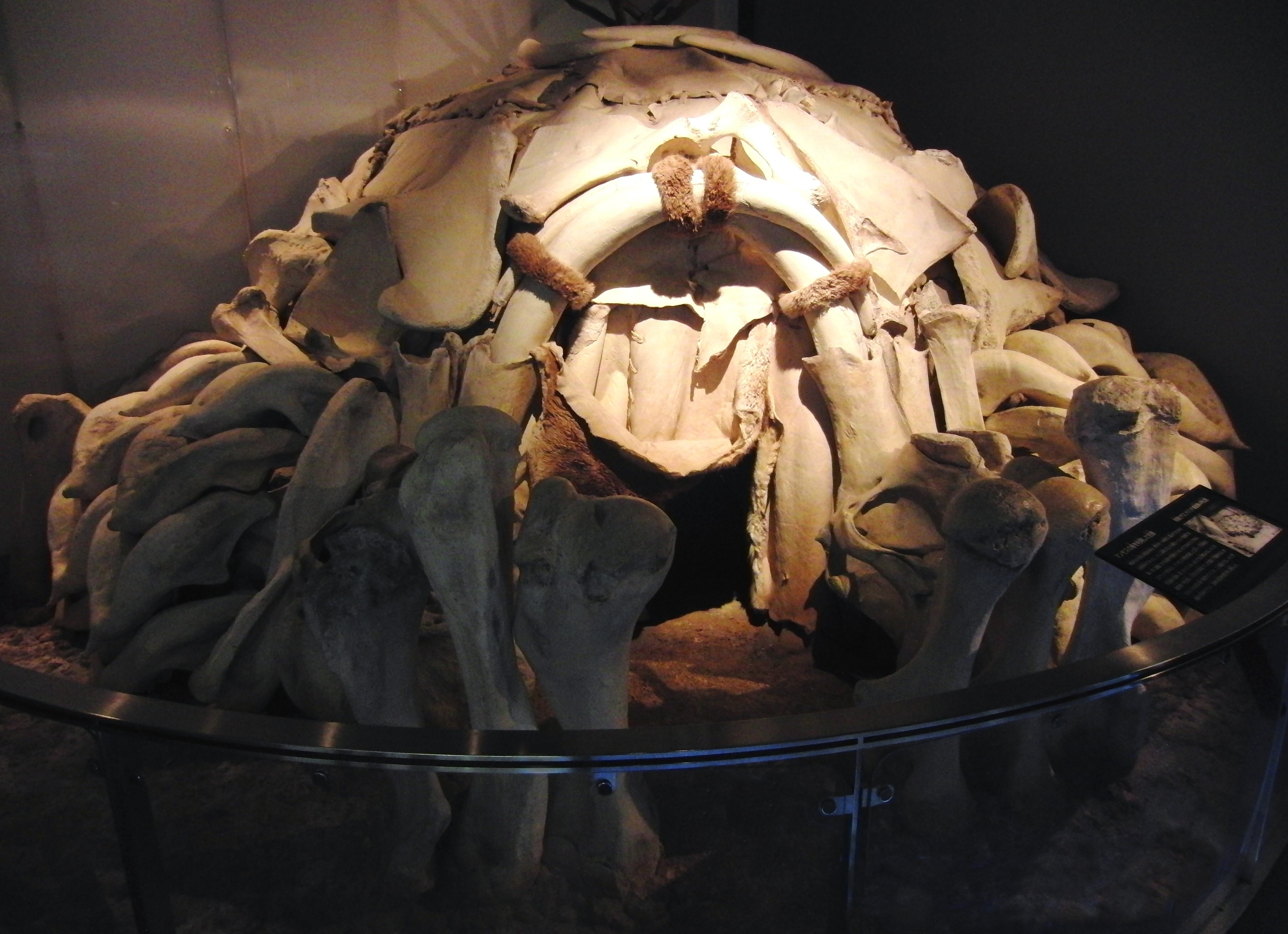
Mammoth bone dwelling

The oldest pit dwellings were discovered in Mezhyrich, Central Ukraine. Dating back 15,000 years to the Upper Paleolithic age, the houses were made of mammoth bones. The base is circular or oval in shape, 12 to 14 feet (3.7 to 4.3 metres) in diameter, with limb bones used for walls and lighter, flat bones used for the roof. Presumably, animal hide was stretched around the exterior for insulation. Each dwelling had a hearth. Groups of houses were arranged around a base camp layout, occupied by families or relatives for weeks or months.

== Early medieval Europe ==
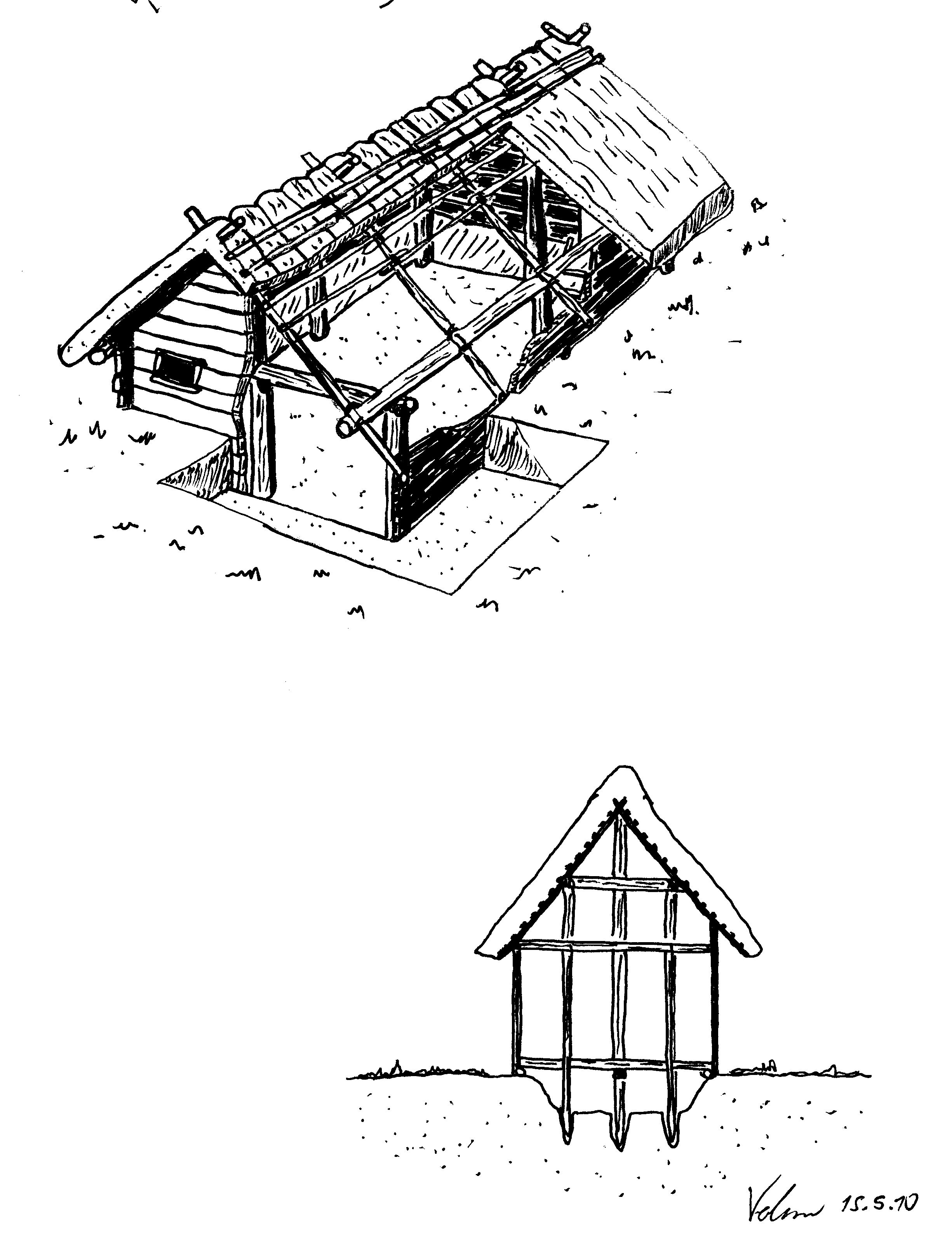

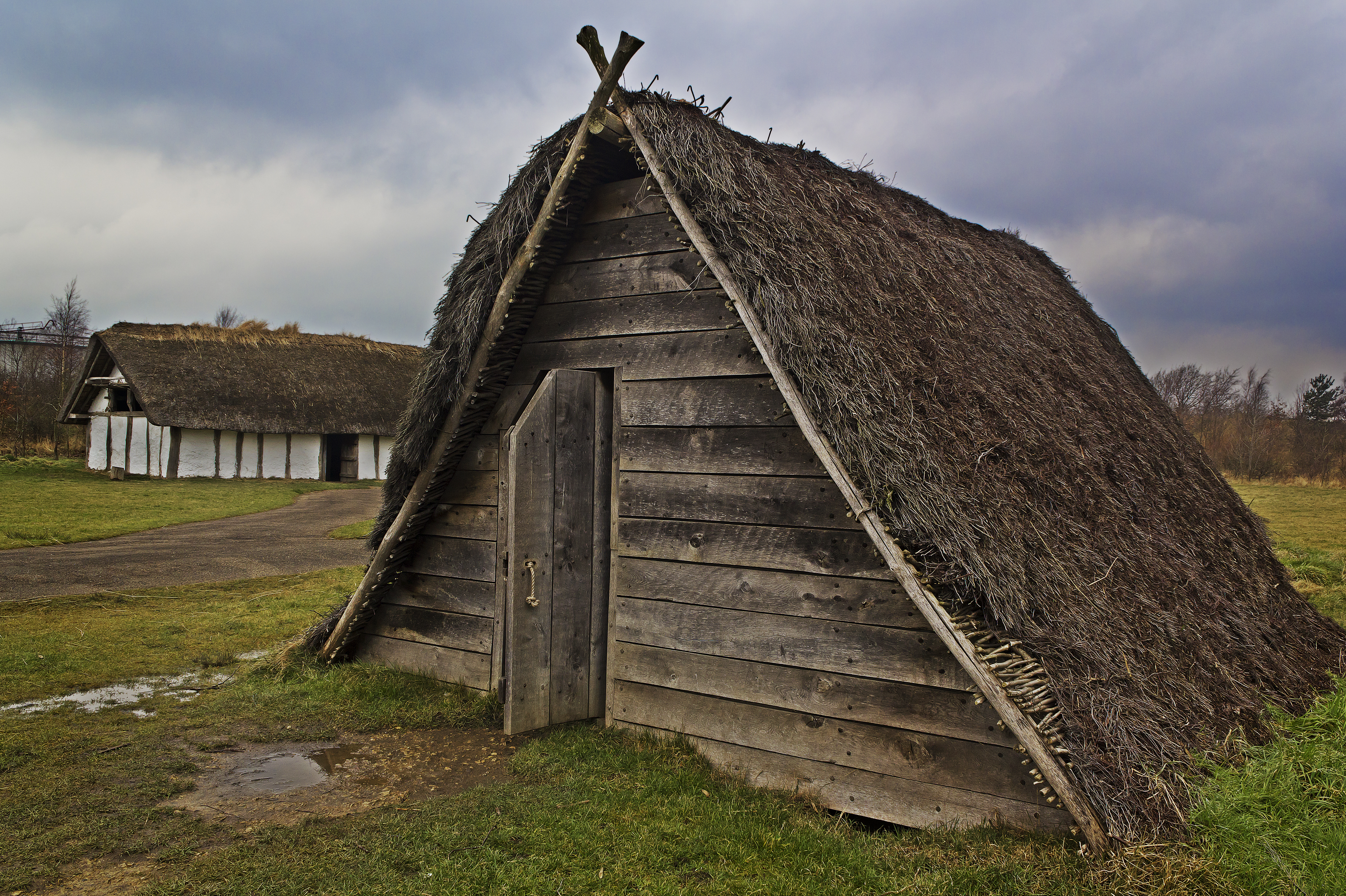
A reconstruction

Pit-houses were built in many parts of northern Europe between the 5th and 12th centuries AD. In Germany they are known as Grubenhäuser, and in the United Kingdom, they are also known as grubhuts, grubhouses or sunken featured buildings.

Archaeological evidence indicates they were built in a shallow sub-rectangular pit and vary in depth (often relating to the preservation of the site). Some may measure 0.25 metres (0.82 ft) by around 2 by 1.5 metres (6.6 by 4.9 ft), whilst examples from excavations from the 1950s onwards at West Stow in the United Kingdom are 3.7–4.44 metres (12.1–14.6 ft) long x 2.72–3.5 metres (8.9–11.5 ft) wide x 0.58–0.97 metres (1.9–3.2 ft) deep. Within this pit were placed two (but sometimes 0, 4, or 6) substantial wooden posts in postholes at either end of the long axis. Some archaeologists have suggested that a suspended wooden floor lay over the pit and that the cavity beneath was used for storage or to control dampness, although others have disputed this, suggesting that grubenhäuser did not have suspended floors at all. A gabled roof supported by the timber posts covered the hut, which likely had no windows and had a single entrance at one end. Excavations at West Stow in the 1970s found preserved evidence of charred planks, suggestive of suspended floors. Hearths were also found, which sat partially over the edge of the sunken pits and appeared to have collapsed downwards when the structure supporting their overhanging sections (possibly a suspended floor) was removed.

Grubenhäuser are often understood to have been domestic dwellings. However, their use may have varied, especially on a regional basis. In Western Europe their small size and the fact that they can be found near other buildings and associated finds of loom weights has led to theories that they had a specialised purpose such as for weaving sheds. In the Slavonic regions of Eastern Europe, Grubenhäuser are larger and often have a fireplace. In most settlements there have been no features of buildings at ground level.

There are reconstructions of pit-houses in several open-air museums, e.g. in the Hitzacker Archaeological Centre, the Kalkriese Museum and Park, the Oerlinghausen Archaeological Open Air Museum, and the Hochdorf Chieftain's Grave.

They compare with the Swedish Backstuga that were very poor people’s homes until the middle of the 20th century.

== In North America ==
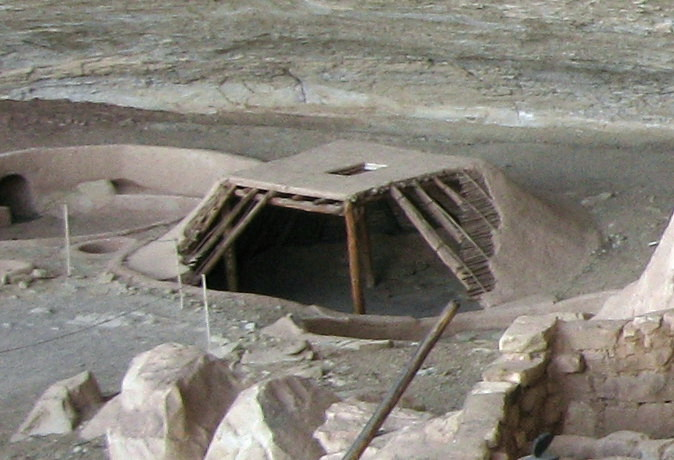
A reconstruction of a pit-house at the Step House ruins in Mesa Verde National Park, United States, shows the pit dug below grade, four supporting posts, roof structure as layers of wood and mud, and the entry through the roof.

Throughout the inland Pacific Northwest, indigenous people were generally mobile about the landscape during the warmer months, procuring resources at different locations according to the season and tradition, and moved during colder months into permanent semi-subterranean pit houses situated near major rivers and tributaries such as the Columbia and Fraser. Pit house villages provided community opportunities and assurances over the winter, as well as social gathering space through which local and regional economies, customs, and traditions were practiced and developed through time. Individual pit houses could vary in shape, but were typically round with wooden frames covered at ground level with thatch and earth, and featured an earthen bench along the circumference used for sitting, sleeping, and storage. The houses could range in size from a few to greater than twenty meters in diameter. A common design featured a central hole in the roof that provided ladder access and ventilation, including for the smoke of an interior fire, though side-entry pit houses were also used.

In the northwestern Great Plains and the Plateau region located nearby, climate changes and extreme temperature and weather conditions made it difficult to live year-round. Hot summers led to the building of simple tent-like structures that were portable and could be packed up to move. For cold winter months, pit-houses provided the warm, protected shelter necessary for survival.

== In Asia ==
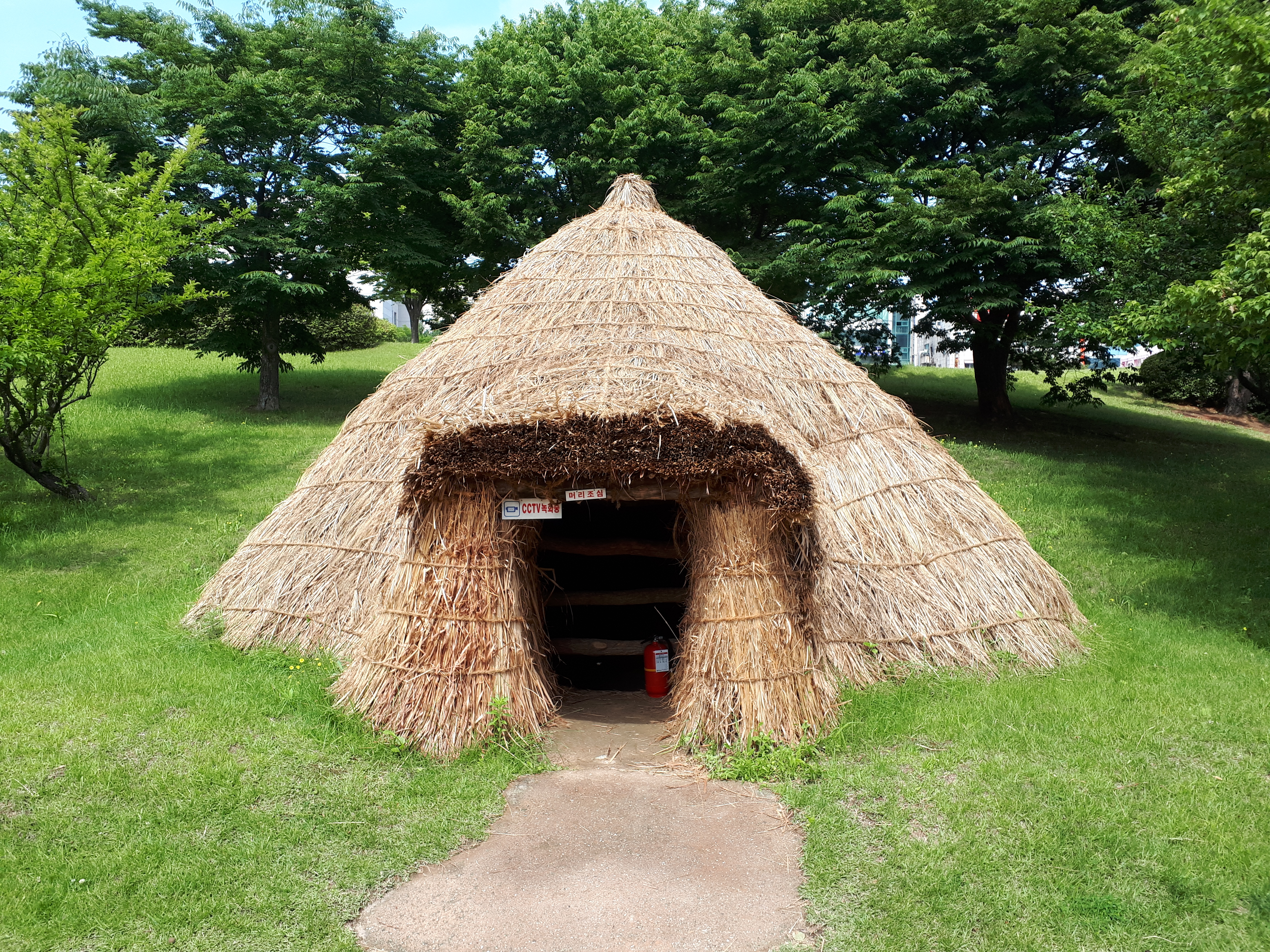
Recreation of an umjip

In Korea, umjip were widely used from the Neolithic Age until the Three Kingdoms of Korea period.

In Japan, dateana tatemono (竪穴建物) were discovered in numerous archeological sites, the earliest site could be traced to Paleolithic Times in Hokkaido and Kyushu.

In China, some Neolithic archaeological sites around the Yellow River such as Banpo and Yangshao culture have found pit-house relics. Until 20th century, diyinzi (地窨子) or diwozi (地窝子) were still built in some northern regions, they have once exclusively built for constructing industrial facilities (e.g. Karamay oil field, Daqing oil field) and during the early period of the Xinjiang Production and Construction Corps.

== Cross-cultural patterning ==
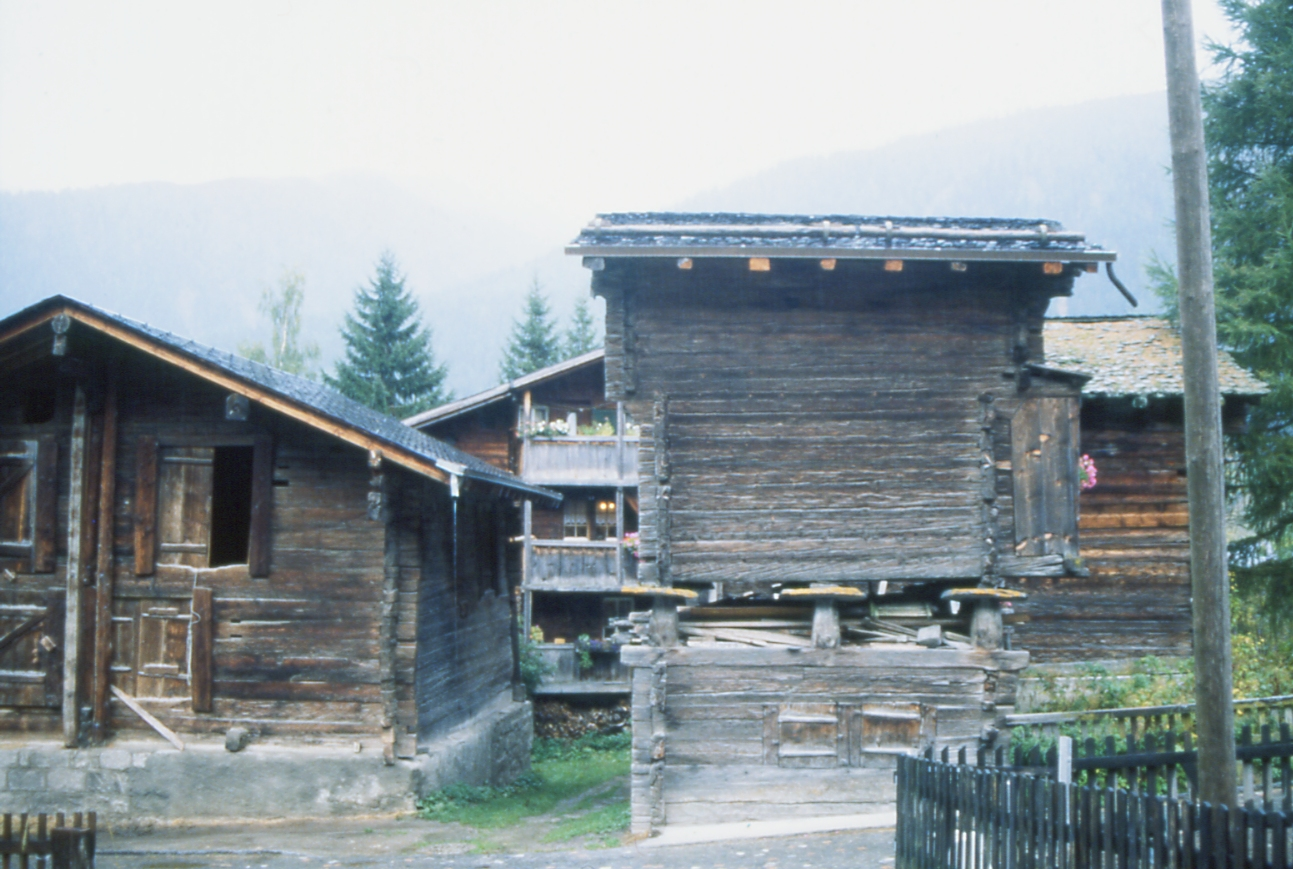
Barn on a wooden cellar in Gluringen, Valais, Switzerland. Traces in the ground would appear as a "pit-house".

A cross-cultural middle range model of pit-house architecture using George Murdock's 1967 Ethnographic Atlas found that 82 of the 862 societies in the sample occupy pit structures as either their primary or secondary dwellings.

All but six of the 82 societies live above 32° north latitude, and four of the six cases in this sample that are below 32° north latitude are from "high mountain" regions in east Africa, Paraguay, and eastern Brazil. The last example is from the Yami who occupied a small island south of Taiwan.

Three conditions were always present among groups in the sample: 1) non-tropical climate during the season of pit structure habitation; 2) minimally a biseasonal settlement pattern; 3) reliance on stored food during the period of pit structure occupation. These conditions may be related to other factors of society and the presence of any or all of these three elements in society does not pre-condition occupation of pit structures. Nonetheless, these three conditions were present in all cases of pit structure occupation present in the Ethnographic Atlas. Other cultural patterns were common, but not universal across the sample. These commonalities include: cold season of occupation, low population estimates, and simple political and economic systems.

The ethnographic sample is based almost entirely on case studies from societies located in northern latitudes. The period of pit structure occupation is generally during the cold season, probably due to their thermal efficiency. Dug into the ground, pit structures take advantage to the insulating properties of soil, as well as having a low profile, protecting them from exposure to wind-induced heat loss. Since less heat is lost by transmission than is in above ground structures, less energy is required to maintain stable temperatures inside the structure.

Out of the 82 ethnographic cases in the Ethnographic Atlas, 50 societies had population estimates. Of these, 64% had fewer than 100 people per settlement. In only 6% of cases were there more than 400 persons per settlement. The cases with the highest population densities were the Arikara and Hidatsa of the North American Great Plains and the Konso of Ethiopia. Gilman attributes high population densities among the Arikara to the availability of buffalo.

Pit structure occupations are generally associated with simple political and economic systems. For 86% of the sample, class stratification or social distinctions based on non-hereditary wealth were reported as absent. However, some pit-dwelling societies are characterized by chiefdom level complexity. In terms of economic organization, 77% of the societies who occupy pit structures had a hunting and gathering economy. This is a large fraction of the sample, but is not considered a universally consistent feature like biseasonal settlement and a reliance on stored foods during pit structure occupation.

During the part of the year when people are not living in pit structures, activities should be focused on acquiring foods to store. Based on the sample from the Ethnographic Atlas, this may be through either hunting and gathering or agricultural activity.

Many different prehistoric groups used pit houses. Although generally associated with the American southwest cultures, such as Fremont, Pueblo, Hohokam, and Mogollon, pit houses were used by a wide variety of people in a wide variety of places over the past 12,000 years. Large pit house formations have been excavated in British Columbia, Canada, such as at Keatley Creek Archaeological Site.

== See also ==
- Burdei
- Dugout (shelter)
- Earth shelter
- Earth lodge
- Kekuli
- Kiva
- Larder
- Pantry
- Quiggly hole
- Root cellar
- Sinagua
- Zemlyanka
- Timber framing
