= Bridge River Rapids =

Coordinates: 50°45′00″N 121°56′00″W

The Bridge River Rapids, also known as the Six Mile Rapids, the Lower Fountain, the Bridge River Fishing Grounds, and in the St'at'imcets language as Sat' or Setl, is a set of rapids on the Fraser River, located in the central Fraser Canyon at the mouth of the Bridge River six miles north of the confluence of Cayoosh Creek with the Fraser and on the northern outskirts of the District of Lillooet, British Columbia, Canada.

== Physical ==
The rapids are among the fiercest on the Fraser and are generally considered impassable to canoes and river-rafting expeditions and are formed by the narrowing of the Fraser's banks by rock ledges at this point. However the diversion of the Bridge River in 1958 with the Bridge River Power Project severely curtailed the flow of the Bridge River, and the combined flows of the river no longer produce the "fountain" of combined waters during spring freshet which led to the location's frontier-era name of the Lower Fountain.

(The Upper Fountain was a longer but equally difficult but not as narrow gauntlet of whitewater a few more miles upstream, below the community of Fountain, which was formerly known as the Upper Fountain; those rapids today are the Upper Fountain Rapids).

== History ==
The narrows in aboriginal legend were formed by Coyote leaping back and forth from bank to bank so as to make a barrier for salmon and places for people to fish.

The location is the most important aboriginal fishing site in the British Columbia Interior and historically it and neighbouring sites along the stretch of river between Fountain and Lillooet attracted over 15,000 people at a time to fish at the site during key salmon runs from the many different peoples of the Interior. It was here early in the 19th century, that an insult by the chief of the Lakes Lillooet to the chief of the Okanagan people, Pelkamulox, led to the death of the latter and an eventual war of revenge against the St'at'imc by his son, the famous Nicola in the late 1830s.

During the Fraser Gold Rush the site was the location of a boomtown known as Bridge River. That name came from the toll-bridge built over the river at this point in 1859 to replace a native-built pole bridge. The town only lasted a few years, as an easier crossing to the Old Cariboo Road was Miller's Ferry, closer to today's Lillooet, at the site of a 1913-built suspension bridge.

A 1950s era proposal to build a dam at Lillooet Canyon, just above the site of today's suspension bridge, which would have inundated the fishing spot and ended the Fraser salmon runs, was abandoned, along with another at Glen Fraser and an even larger dam at Moran Canyon, which would have backed the Fraser up to Williams Lake and beyond.

== Current ownership ==
Today located on an Indian reserve under the administration of the Bridge River Indian Band (Xwisten First Nation, Xwisten being the name of the Bridge River in St'at'imcets), the site is shared by the area's various Indian bands, with certain families having long-standing rights to certain rock platforms and campsites, though few come from other First Nations people in the rest of the Interior anymore. Pole-built fishing platforms jut out over the narrows of the rapids, which form a small waterfall, especially during spring run-off, and fish-drying racks are scattered around the surrounding area (wind-dried salmon is a local specialty, the area being so subject to dry winds pouring down the canyon no smoking is required). A modern pictograph created by Saul Terry, showing a sun-face with a salmon-shaped mouth, overlooks the main part of the site, which is a series of rock formations in the angle of the Bridge and Fraser Rivers. Fishing by non-natives is not permitted unless permission is granted by the Bridge River Indian Band. Historically natives used spears and dip nets to catch salmon, which are readily visible in their attempts to leap the rough waters of the gorge.

== See also ==
- Kettle Falls
- Celilo Falls
