= Amsa-dong Prehistoric Site =

Archaeological site in Seoul, South Korea

Amsa-dong Prehitoric Site
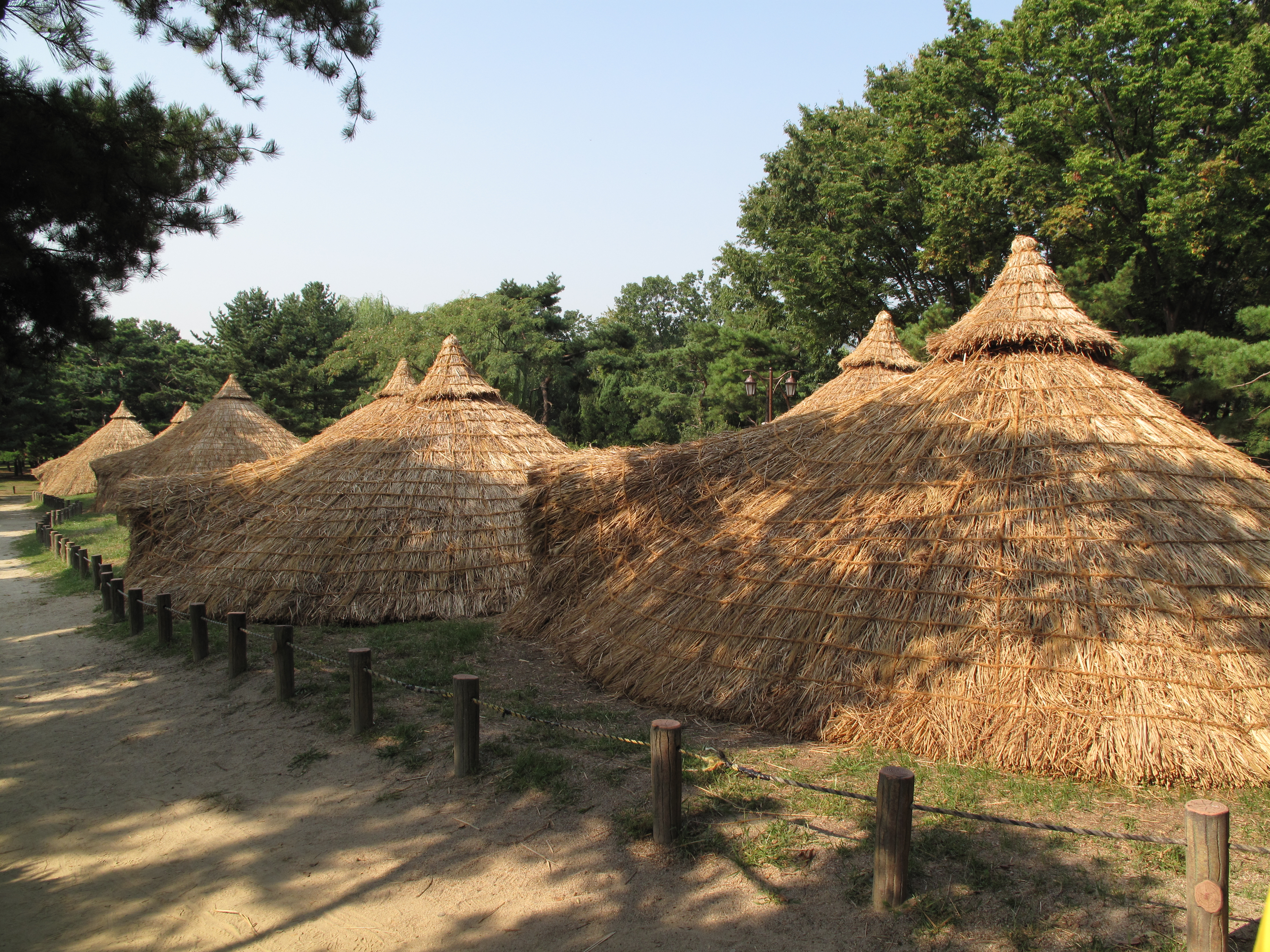
- Some recreated umjip in the site (2016)
- Interactive map of Amsa-dong Prehitoric Site
- Coordinates: 37.560°N 127.129°E

Historic Sites of South Korea
- Official name: Archaeological Site in Amsa-dong, Seoul
- Designated: 1979-07-26

Korean name
- Hangul: 암사동 유적
- Hanja: 岩寺洞 遺蹟
- RR: Amsa-dong yujeok
- MR: Amsa-dong yujŏk

The Amsa-dong Prehistoric Site (Korean: 암사동 유적), also called Amsa-dong Prehistoric Settlement Site, is an archaeological site and open-air museum in Amsa-dong, Gangdong District, Seoul, South Korea. The site contains evidence of human habitation from at 3,000 to 4,000 years before the present. On July 26, 1979, the site was made a Historic Site of South Korea.

Around 4,000 B.C., people of the area lived inside huts with lowered floors called umjip. There is evidence of the consumption of cooked grain and fish by 3,000 B.C. Around 1,500 B.C., communities began transitioning into the Bronze Age and farming at scale.

Due to modern Seoul's significant urbanization, this site is the only known major archaeological site in Seoul where Stone Age materials have been found, although such materials have also been found in minor sites throughout the city (and all around the surrounding Han River basin), often through rescue archaeology.

The site is now partially open to the public, with museum exhibits and recreations of umjip.

== See also ==
- History of Korea
  - Prehistoric Korea
  - History of Seoul
- List of museums in Seoul
