= Keatley Creek =

Coordinates: 50°47′50″N 121°51′30″W

Keatley Creek is a left tributary of the Fraser River in the Glen Valley area of the Fraser Canyon in the Interior of British Columbia, Canada. Its outlet into the Fraser is between those of Pavilion and Fountain Creeks, approximately 16 miles upstream from the town of Lillooet; the next tributary southwards is the larger Sallus Creek.

== Course ==
The creek begins high in the northwestern ramparts of the plateau-like Clear Range, and its upper course is between eroded mountainsides that are actually only the flanks of the flat summits of the range. In the midst of its course, as with most other tributaries of the Fraser in this region, it cuts through benchlands formed by old lake beds via a steep canyon. The benchlands are ranchland and have been at times irrigated for alfalfa and other crops.

== History ==
On one of those benchlands is the Keatley Creek Archaeological Site, which was once a large riverside housepit (quiggly hole or kekuli) village. Of great antiquity like X̱á:ytem in the Fraser Valley, the site is among the most important in Canada and has been exhaustively studied and documented by archaeologists. Investigations have been led by Brian Hayden of Simon Fraser University, who dubbed the largest pithouse in the site as "Coyote's Big House" in the title of one of his works, as the trickster-being Coyote is important in local legends and name-stories. What caused the demise of the village's society is as yet unknown, though a landslide blocking the Fraser near Texas Creek, south of Lillooet, may have critically destroyed the local indigenous fishery. Alternative theories put emphasis on relative over-population and resource over-exploitation in the context of climate change. The large village is one of the biggest of its kind found to date in the Mid-Fraser.
