= Umjip =

Prehistoric pit dwellings in Korea

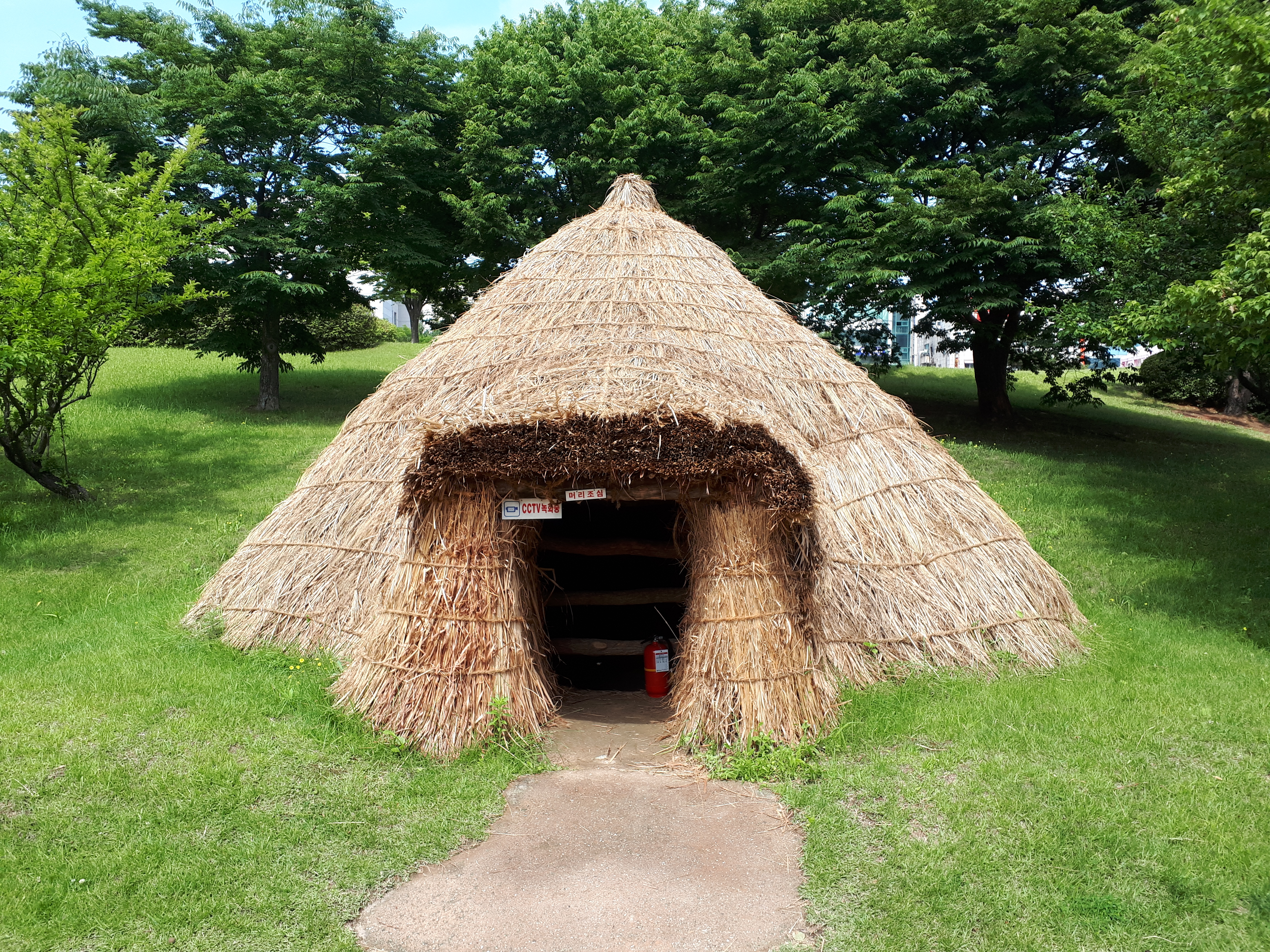
A modern recreation of an umjip

Umjip (Korean: 움집) were pit-houses that were used for housing in prehistoric Korea. These huts were widely used in Korea from the Neolithic Age until the Three Kingdoms period.

The floor of the hut would be dug below the ground level. In colder regions, the pit would be around 1 m (3.3 ft) deep, and in warmer around half that depth. The floor area would be around 20 to 30 m^{2} (220 to 320 sq ft). Hunter-gatherers tended to have round umjip, and farmers square; it is believed that there was a rough progression from round to square houses over time. The floor would be made of compacted earth and have animal skins or grass laid onto it. At least one entrance to the house would also be dug, with stairs up to ground level. Two Y-shaped pillars would be placed along the center axis of the structure to support the roof. A thatched roof would then be placed on top; this roof would be woven tight enough to be effectively waterproof. The hut's low height above the ground meant that it dealt with wind relatively well and was relatively sturdy.

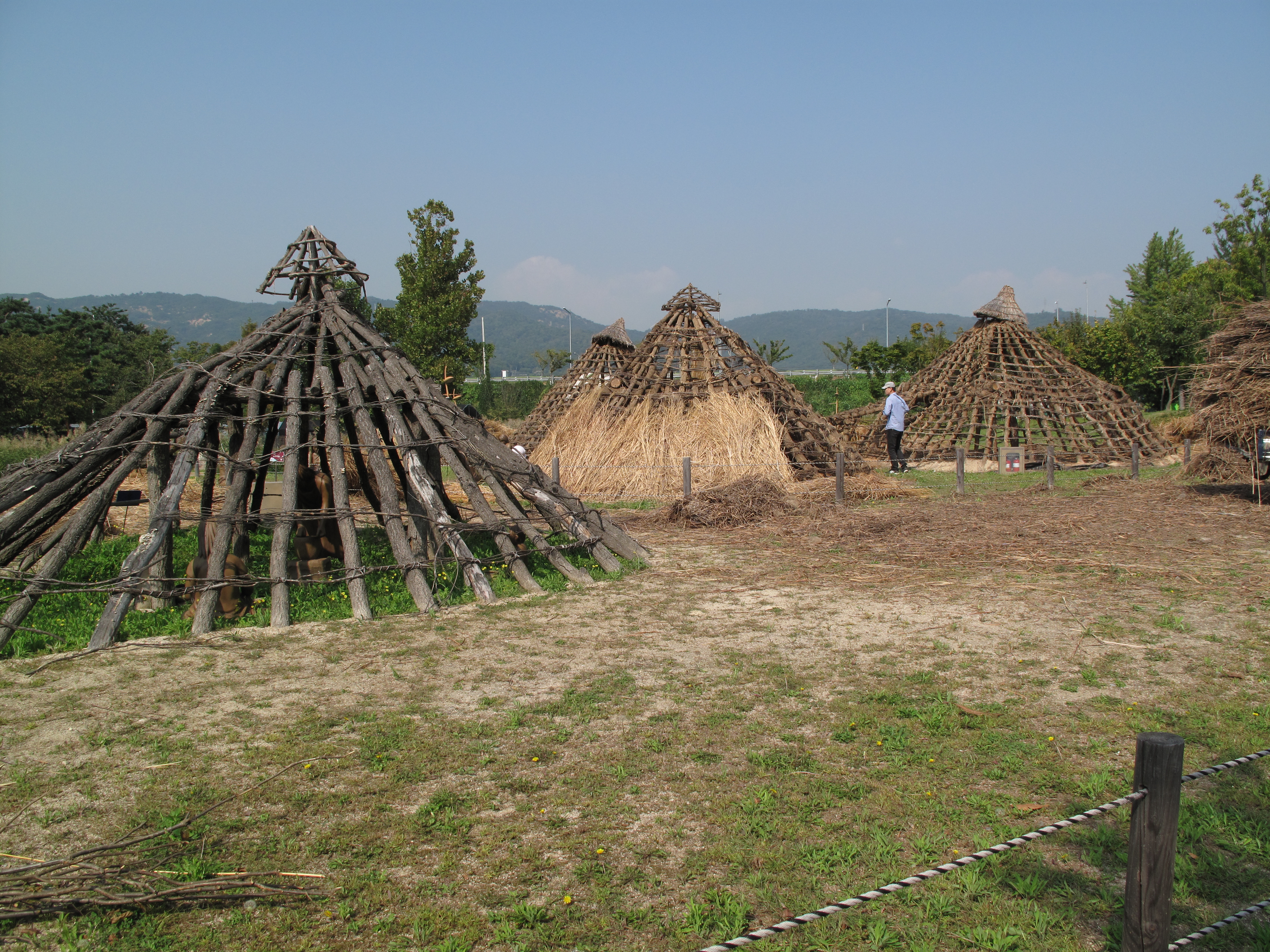
Various reconstructed umjip at various stages of completion in Amsa-dong Neolithic Site

The interior of the house was typically divided by function. Men typically left tools for their activities outside the home near the entrance of the hut, and women typically operated deeper in the interior. According to a writer for the Encyclopedia of Korean Culture, this gendered division of the home possibility later evolved into the sarangchae and anchae division.

The structures had a number of disadvantages. The floor of the structures were often cold in the winter, despite fires lit in the umjip; the later invention of ondol heated floors helped with this situation. Lighting and ventilation were poor inside the structures, as they were below ground and without windows. Due to the disadvantages of these structures, walled structures above ground became more popular.
