= Bawijeol Maeul Hosang Nori =

Funeral custom in Korea

Bawijeol Maeul Hosang Nori (Korean: 바위절마을호상놀이) is a traditional custom in Korea, performed in a person's funeral. This ritual is in respect of the person who lived a long and happy life. In this custom, the main singer performs (선소리꾼) and others (상두꾼) hold a casket. This ritual takes place on the night before the funeral.

== Origin ==
It is impossible to know the exact date or time when it had started. But according to the village elders, this had originated from the famous Moon family from Bawijeol Village (바위절마을). But it got discontinued after 1960 and was again performed in the 90s when the coffin bearers of a married couple appeared in the village.

== Description ==
Hosang nori is a ritual where people portray the good family circumstances, blessings and sing folk songs all night long for the deceased person. The thirty-six coffin bearers divided into four rows carry a huge bier. They sing songs by moving forwards and backwards to console the soul and honour his achievements in his life.

This traditional custom usually takes place at Amsa-dong of Gangdong-gu district in Seoul. The neighbourhood and people from the neighbouring villages assemble at the funeral house (상가집) the previous day. A special song (요령잡기소리) is sung while they carry the bier to enter the house. The singers and the other merchants assemble matching their feet to the rhythm of the song. Another song (향도가) is sung while leaving the house, carrying the bier. The whole performance is entertaining and a treat to the eyes.

== Process of Bawijeolmaeul Hosangnori ==
In Bawijeol village, there is a large rock situated in the entrance along with a temple. In 1963, this village had been incorporated into Seoul from Gwangju city, Gyeonggi province. The game of Bawijeolmaeul Hosangnori is played by using various props. The props that are used are in the following order:

1. Funeral banner (명정),
2. A hanging lantern (등롱),
3. A Buddhist monk (스님),
4. Yeongyeo (a tool that is used to carry human bodies to the cemetery),
5. Hemp cloth used to clean coffins when burying coffins at funerals (공포),
6. Manjang (만장)- A writing written on silk cloth or paper for the dead and carried behind the bier.
7. Drum (북),
8. Lead Singer (선소리꾼),
9. Coffin bearer (상여꾼),
10. Drummers (복잽이),
11. Mourners (조객),
12. Funeral procession (조문후객), etc.

In Bawijeol Maeul Nori, the whole funeral procession party has to cross the stream of the village. A footstool made by tying two or three logs together is connected to a single wooden bridge with a copper bridge. The coffin bearers stand in a ‘V’ formation to balance themselves while crossing the river while on the bridge. In addition to that, there is also a stepping stone bridge on which they need to step on stones to cross the stream, and it is difficult maintaining their balance. After crossing the stream, the pallbearers gather to build a house for the diseased person, where the person might live for another ten thousand years. They sing Bang-A-Taryeong (방아타령) while building the house.

== Achievements ==
In 1990, Bawijeol Maeul Hosang Nori had received the encouragement prize at the 31st folk art contest and in 1996, it was acknowledged as an intangible cultural property of the Seoul Metropolitan Government.
