= Keathley =

Keathley is a surname. The name is of English origin and mostly found in North America. Notable people with the surname include:

- George D. Keathley (1917–1944), US Army staff sergeant who received the Medal of Honor for actions in World War II
  - USNS Sgt. George D. Keathley, World War II United States cargo vessel
- Kevin Keathley, basketball coach and author
