= Anna Marie Prentiss =

American archaeologist

- Scientific career
- Workplaces: University of Montana

Anna Marie Prentiss is an American archaeologist and Regents Professor of Anthropology at the University of Montana. She is known for her works on the history of the Great Plains, Pacific Northwest, and Arctic regions of North America. She is a member of the American Academy of Arts and Sciences.
