= Keatley Creek archaeological site =

Archaeological site in British Columbia, Canada

Keatley Creek is a significant archaeological site in the interior of British Columbia and is located in the traditional territory of the St'at'imc. The site is near the town of Lillooet, on a benchland flanking Keatley Creek. The site holds the remnants of multiple prehistoric, semi-subterranean wooden dwellings (pit-houses), and is one of the largest and most-studied pit-house village sites in Canada, with some of the widest pit-house depressions (house pits) in the archaeological record. It is believed that the site was inhabited as early as 6000 BCE (8000 BP).

The site was once a large, complex community, and around 4800 BCE (6850 BP), it developed an economy centred around gathering, fishing, and hunting. The Keatley Creek site flourished around 400 BCE (2425 BP) with a maximum population of about 1000. At that time, the network of villages in the Mid-Fraser region would have been one of the largest pre-contact aboriginal communities within the modern borders of Canada. Although there is continued debate about the site's occupation and abandonment or depopulation, the community was vacated perhaps as early as the 11th century (1000 BP) or as late as the 13th century (800 BP), as were the neighbouring villages. No decisive evidence has been found of either warfare or a deadly epidemic causing this decline. It is possible that environmental catastrophe or climate change caused or contributed to the village's abandonment.

Keatley Creek is of special importance to the cultural heritage of First Nations communities. It is a provincially recognized cultural heritage area and has attracted international attention at a UNESCO research forum.

== Location ==
The Keatley Creek site (Borden Number EeRl-7) is an archaeological excavation site in southwestern British Columbia, Canada, and is located within the traditional territory of the St'at'imc First Nation. The site is situated on the British Columbia Plateau(also known as the Plateau of the Interior Pacific Northwest), about 25 km upstream on the Fraser River from Lillooet, the closest town. It lies within the Glen Fraser ranchlands in what is called the Middle Fraser Canyon or "Mid-Fraser", between the St'at'imc communities of Xaxlip (Fountain) and Ts'kwaylacw (Pavilion).

Keatley Creek is "...nestled in a small basin at the back edge of a Pleistocene river terrace, where [the terrace] meets the mountain slope, over 1200 ft. (360 m) above the Fraser River" on terrain described as "benchlands above the [...] gorge". The village was close to many other small and medium communities including the downriver villages of Seton Lake (EeRl-21), Lillooet, Bridge River (EeRl-4), Fountain, and Bell (EeRk-4), as well as the upriver villages of Pavilion, McKay Creek (EfRl-3 and EfRl-13), Chicken Gully (EfRl-5), Kelly Creek (or Pełtêqet) (EfRk-1 and EfRl-25), and Cavanaugh Creek (or Łenłan'iten) (EfRl-4). Several of these villages (including Lillooet, Fountain, and Pavilion) have now been destroyed. Of the remaining Plateau pithouse tradition village settlements in the Mid-Fraser region, only the Kelly Creek and Keatley Creek sites have more than one hundred depressions.

== Site ==
The site itself stretches over a kilometre, with the core area with the greatest concentration of house pits covering in a four hectare radius. The site supported a long period of human occupation, and was one of the largest villages in the Mid-Fraser region. Carbon dating puts initial occupation at around 8000–7000 BP. The site was more or less consistently occupied from the Shuswap horizon (4000–2400 BP) through the Plateau horizon (2400–1200 BP) and into the early Kamloops horizon (from 1200 BP).

The site features include 119 depressions, called house pits or quiggly holes. Keatley Creek is "known for the unusually large size of its semisubterranean houses", some more than 20 metres in diameter, although many are no larger than 5 metres. Preliminary investigation by Lepofsky et al. has indicated that the Keatley Creek area was occupied by "residential corporate groups of differing economic and social status."

== Village life ==
At its peak (c. 1250 BP), Keatley Creek's population numbered over 700 and probably around 1000. This so-called zenith is known as the Classic Lillooet Phase, where the villages existed in some form of network—either relatively autonomously or as multi-village communities. Tools, baskets, and hunting weapons found in excavations at Keatley Creek indicate that its ancient inhabitants had been the Stl'atl'imx, a Salish-speaking people who were gatherer-hunter-fishers living during the cold winter months in pit-houses, and engaging in a variety of forms of food storage that included both harvest and material storage, and husbandry of one domesticated animal, the dog. The house-pit village in some ways lends itself to the creation of a material history, as Anna Marie Prentiss explains:

Housepit villages such as Keatley Creek and Bridge River developed over hundreds of years. The archaeological record of many housepits formed through regular reoccupations organized around cleaning and rebuilding activities. An early researcher in this area, James Teit recorded that people constructed them by first digging a pit and then acquiring wood for upright posts and horizontal beams. The wood superstructure was then built by using strong upright posts to support the horizontal beams. Layers of timbers and matting covered the roof, and in some cases sediments sealed the construction, offering extra insulation. People dug pits indoors and lined them with birch bark to store food. They constructed hearths and made benches and storage platforms. Aside from regular cleaning, a family could live in such a house for up to 20 years without significant architectural modification.

At some point, however, wood would become dangerously old, and vermin could infest portions of the roof and floor. In these cases, good timbers would be salvaged and the old roof burned down. Families returning from late warm-season food-gathering trips would then rebuild roofs and floors before they re-inhabited the houses. Sometimes rebuilding involved removing all of the burned roof materials and scraping out the old floors. At other times, as with many Bridge River houses, the people would remove burned and collapsed roof materials but not the floors. Instead, they would import new sediments and dump them over the old floors, thereby preserving an even more detailed record of household life over multiple generations.

It is worth noting that the Keatley Creek and Bridge River sites have some differences in pit-house formation. At Keatley Creek, houses generally consist of the final inhabitant's floor; previous floors and roofs have been re-deposited on rims. Keatley Creek society was part of the spectrum of complex gatherer-hunter-fisher societies. Such sedentism is widespread in the archaeological record (such as the Middle Jōmon culture of Japan, the northern European Mesolithic, the Natufian of the Near East, and the Thule tradition of North America's Western Arctic). At the same time, the pit-house villages along the Mid-Fraser are arguably "among the largest hunter-gatherer settlements recorded anywhere in the world for any period. They are much larger than most, if not all, prehistoric villages on the adjacent Northwest Coast. The only precontact settlements of comparable size within the modern borders of Canada were the horticultural Iroquoian villages of southern Ontario."

=== Dynamic seasonal round ===
Archaeologists have argued for at least a basic level of cultural continuity in the region, noting the consistency between traditional knowledge, oral and written historical records, and archaeological evidence. This suggests that the yearly round or seasonal life movements of the inhabitants of Keatley Creek were likely in general accord with those recorded in traditional ethnography. Hayden and Spafford suggest:

In the fall, large stores of salmon would be caught and dried along the Fraser River for winter food. After the fishing ended, the major deer hunt of the year took place in the alpine meadows. When cold weather set in, everyone would retreat to winter villages on the terraces of the Fraser River, where fish, meat, and plant foods were stored. During the winter, families lived in pithouses dug partly into the ground and covered with a conical wooden roof on which soil and sediment was piled for insulation, much like the roof of historical sod-covered cabins. Entry was generally via a ladder protruding through the smoke hole of the roof; [...] and we think that people were relatively tightly bunched together in these houses for warmth during the frigid winters.

By March, the people were anxious to move into the open and began to look for the first edible plant shoots and bulbs, such as young raspberry shoots and wild onions. Spring was often a time of hunger if winter food stores had been used up, and the first signs of spring salmon were eagerly awaited. When the snows had cleared in the mountains, most groups went to dig spring beauty corms ("mountain potatoes") and mountain lilies, as well as hunt and fish in the mountain lakes [...]. In mid to late summer, people gathered saskatoon and other berries as they ripened at lower elevations. By late summer, everyone was back down at the river fishing sites preparing fish for the winter and trading with visitors.

Therefore, although a critical amount of nutrition came from gathered foods (plants, geophytes or roots and tubers, and berries), supplemented by deer, salmon was also a key source of nutrients. Trade and exchange for dried salmon also brought together goods from considerable distances away, such as ground stone bowls, obsidian, and nephrite jade. Chinook, sockeye, chum, and coho salmon were available from August to October and were caught, dried, and stored for later use throughout the winter.

Chinook and sockeye were, in the ethnographic record, preferred over chum and coho, probably because of their stronger, richer flavour, although they take longer to dry. Salmon DNA studies show that during the period Keatley Creek was inhabited, pink salmon, a fish known to be easy to catch and to dry, were absent from the region. Climatic changes would have affected salmon populations, with growth during cooler periods and reduction during warmer periods.Palynology, alluvial stratigraphy, paleo-oceanography, and studies of pre-history now show that the regional climate (and likely also the seasonal round) significantly alternated, with a dry interval (2200 to 1600 BP) followed by a cool, moist interval (1600 to 1200 BP) and then a return to drier conditions, corresponding with the Medieval Warm Period.

=== Social organization ===
The presence of somewhat unequal pit-house sizes, storage pits, and differences in the type and quality of dietary and lithic (stone tool) remains make Keatley Creek an important archaeological site in debates about the development of social inequality.

Initial research indicated that "mass harvest and storage permitted sedentism and inequality in natural abundances led to social inequalities." Winter survival relied on extensive use of food storage, which became more important as the population of Keatley Creek grew. Storage technologies in the Mid-Fraser were varied and included cache pits, above-ground facilities, baskets, and cords.

Three types of "corporate group" were reportedly identified in the Keatley Creek village: several families living in the same structure; an individual family in its own structure; and large amorphous 'neighbourhood' groups. Studies indicate an early socioeconomic strategy and signs of sociopolitical complexity suggesting domestic subgroups within households and within the community at large, especially in the final centuries of Keatley Creek's occupation. The biggest dwellings have the largest storage capacity, more prestige foods (e.g. chinook salmon) and lithics such as obsidian, steatite, and nephrite which would have been difficult to obtain. Following from this analysis, the four largest pit-houses represent the accommodations of multi-household clans or otherwise higher status social groups. Dogs were also kept by higher status dwellings for "hunting, transportation, protection and companionship, clothing (hides), weaving materials (hair), ritual, and food."

Subsequent research has reconsidered the relationship between economic stratification and salmon species distribution at Keatley Creek as "visible but clearly not as dramatic as previously assumed" due to the overall prevalence of chinook salmon. Some archaeologists have also suggested that social stratification took place not during a time of population growth, but social contraction due to internal or external contradictions facing Keatley Creek. Therefore, "the pattern of inequality was not triggered by any major technological changes or expansions in per-capita storage. Rather, it appears to have come as a consequence of households changing the rules of food sharing and consumption under stressful conditions."

== Excavation and research ==
Keatley Creek has been the site of active excavations from 1986 and ongoing from 2013. The main projects have been led by Brian Hayden and Anna Marie Prentiss.

=== Hayden projects ===
In 1986, Brian Hayden of Simon Fraser University, British Columbia, began the initial project at Keatley Creek. The study's initial aim was to "determine why this site was so large and why some of the individual semi-subterranean housepits were also unusually big." Hayden's group was also interested in the cultural continuity in the region and exploring houses where multiple families lived in what were described as "residential corporate groups" Hayden's expedition examined the botanical, faunal, and lithic remains at the site and explored the formation of different types of strata and construction, examining floors, roofs, middens, and hearths. They sought to identify activities and social habits that occurred at Keatley Creek through examining stone artifacts and debitage (waste products from manufacture). The nature of each structure was examined in order to compare the "economic and social organization" of the residences. Over the years, Hayden's excavations have expanded, and his work continued with varied hypotheses. Ongoing studies have been documented in several further publications (see Further reading).

=== Prentiss projects ===
Anna Marie Prentiss of the University of Montana has included Keatley Creek in her study of Plateau villages throughout prehistory. She has explored the evolution of variations in the Plateau villages, including the need to draw distinctions between "socioeconomically 'complex' communities and those designated as 'sociopolitically' complex." She anticipated that findings at Keatley Creek would contribute to understanding the distribution of ethnographic cultures in the region. Additionally, her work identified the possibility that the Keatley Creek community had emerged as a "complex collector socioeconomic strategy." Her study of Keatley Creek Site contributes to her exploration of the "rise and fall of human societies during that long time span we call the Archaic." Prentiss' studies have been numerous and documented in several publications (see Further reading).

=== Other projects ===
Several other subjects of study have involved Keatley Creek Site including (but not limited to):

- Keatley Creek's general contribution to the study of human evolution and life in hunter-gatherer-fisher society
- Household archaeology, the history of agriculture and evolution of agricultural economies, roots of social inequality
- The demography of early households
- Sediment characterization, activity areas identification, and the degree to which activities leave detectable chemical residues
- The concept of house societies especially among hunter-gatherer-fishers
- Mobility of household members
- Prehistoric bone assemblages
- Radiocarbon dating of Keatley Creek structures
- Distribution of ethnographic cultures
- Prehistoric socioeconomic status
- The role of "combined paleoethnobotanical and zooarchaeological analyses in studies of prehistoric social and economic organization"

== Keatley Creek housepits ==
The Keatley Creek winter village is geographically positioned near the Fraser River to "protect access to critical salmon resource." The area also provided a wide array of other natural resources (game for hunting, wood for construction, stone for tools).

=== Basic structural concept ===
The housepits of Keatley Creek are semi-subterranean structures. Their construction was labour-intensive and provided permanent structures in a generally circular shape with conical or pyramidal roof shapes. Entrance to the housepit was made possible by a log ladder that emerged through an opening located somewhat centrally in the roof protruding through the smoke hole. In general, each housepit affords only 2.5 square meters of floor space per person occupying the space. Pit houses, like other First Nations boreal forest home structures, were environmentally sustainable, leaving almost no footprint on the landscape when abandoned.

=== Small housepit ===
Hayden's group tested Housepit #12—one of the smaller housepits at the Keatley Creek site. It measured 9 meters in diameter (rim crest to rim crest) where most small housepits are 7m in diameter. Compared to other small structures, housepit 12 had a substantial roof, indicating that these residents were not the poorest in the Keatley Creek community, but they were still impoverished compared to the residents of the larger structures at the site. There was little use of the fire hearth, as foods required no cooking and were served unheated. It was essential for inhabitants to huddle for warmth. In this site, there was evidence of lower grade foods and clothing. There was very little storage space. The overall space was divided into distinct areas for butchering/eating, stonework and tools, and open or communal areas. No distinct areas were reserved for lying down or sleeping, unlike peripheral areas of the larger housepits.

=== Medium housepit ===
Hayden's excavation included Housepit #3, which measured 14 meters in diameter. It is estimated that thirty people (i.e., five or six nuclear families) occupied this structure. Deposits here indicate some elements of wealth, larger storage pits, some higher grade food products, and probable access to better fishing sites than the residents of the smaller housepits. The wood used for fuel was the same type as for the small housepit, but here was evidence of greater use of fire and of the hearths. There were bedding materials at the peripheral walls with some raised sleeping platforms signifying another difference from the residents of the smaller structures. The medium-sized housepit included separate domestic spaces with a central communal area. The overall space was divided into four sectors with a principal hearth in central area.

=== Large housepit ===
The large housepit was especially important to Hayden's study of residential corporate groups and how the artifacts and assemblages could be used to compare the life practices of people living in the larger structures with those in the smaller size housepits. Hayden's team excavated Housepit #7, which measured 19 meters in diameter from rim crest to rim crest. They estimated that at least 45 people lived in this structure at one time—perhaps eight separate families or domestic units. The deposits found here indicated that these occupants enjoyed substantial economic resources and wealth compared to the residents of small structures. Higher grade construction materials and processes were employed. There were multiple hearths used regularly, some of them unusually large. Per capita storage areas were far larger and more numerous than those of other housepits. High-quality foods were available including more meat products (such as fox, bear, and sheep) and some unexpected species (such as scallops, which would have been obtained in trade from the coast). These occupants had access to a wide array of wealth items. Overall, they were economically well-off. It is possible that they even had dogs as pets. Separate domestic units in the large housepit each contained hearths, tools, comforts, and conveniences. The structure held a central communal area with an especially large hearth. The division of the overall space indicates the possibility of sexual division of workspaces and for a "fundamental socioeconomic division" within the structure—perhaps including controlling families and tenant families or those who worked for the household. It is possible that some members of this household held high status in the community at large. Evidence indicates that the major housepits were continuously occupied over several generations, perhaps more than 1,000 years, by "a single, identifiable social group" which maintained the structure's roof, storage areas, and basic organization. The households were able to successfully replenish themselves by recruiting new members throughout their occupation.

=== Other structures ===
Of the 119 housepits noted at Keatley Creek, some were apparently used as storage facilities of varying sizes (some quite large). Also evident are communal roasting pits outside of the residential structures.

== Debate about occupation and abandonment ==
Some controversy surrounds the dates of Keatley Creek's occupation and the reason for its depopulation. The debate is impeded partly by the margin of error associated with radiocarbon dating. What is agreed by all researchers is that long before contact and colonization the large villages had disappeared—although the local area was never abandoned by indigenous peoples and, before contact and colonization, the indigenous population rose again. As the villages in the Mid-Fraser Canyon contained one of the highest population densities in the Pacific Northwest, their breakup must have had significant repercussions for social life throughout the entire region. In identifying the exact reason, or reasons, for that change there is less consensus.

To be sure, not all researchers agree the site was continuously inhabited, nor do they agree on how or why the social communities came together. Two main proposals have been formulated: Hayden emphasizes technological development, and Prentiss emphasizes environmental factors and limitations.

=== Early occupancy and catastrophe ===
Hayden places Keatley Creek's occupancy as beginning in 2600 BP and ending c. 1000 BP (650 BC – 950 AD). The villages came together at a moment which allowed for technological improvements to allow for the production of food surpluses through salmon harvest, and with the development of competitive feasting, social inequality emerged.

The villages were long-lived until a serious problem with the salmon population arose, leading to abandonment in 1000 AD. This is when a single catastrophic event—a massive rockslide below Lillooet at Texas Creek—destroyed salmon runs in the Fraser and created a crisis for Keatley Creek residents. The slide would have created a long-lasting dam for salmon, preventing their access to necessary spawning beds.

The exact date of the Texas Creek slide is unclear, as is evidence of a large backed-up lake; both problems are cited within Hayden's thesis.

=== Waves of population growth reach limits ===
Prentiss, on the other hand, estimates that occupancy was from 1700 BP to 800 BP (c. 300 – 1200 AD). Significant climatic warming was taking place during the initial period of village formation, increasing vegetation and likely decreasing the salmon population. Small village formation was driven by resource scarcity and a need to collaborate in order to conserve the salmon resources. A complex process of cultural transmission associated with population expansion took place later, when the climate shifted to be more favorable for salmon. Later, depopulation took place in two waves, around 800 BP (1200 AD) associated with climatic deterioration during the Medieval Warm Period or the "early Neoglacial period". Stress on these communities was probably exacerbated by resource exhaustion of local roots and tubers. Dietary records suggest that people searched for food further afield from the villages and had more reliance on lower-quality food such as seeds. The complexity of hunting tools indicated that more diverse species of animals also were hunted further afield. This adds up to a "Malthusian ceiling" associated with reduction in critical subsistence resources, social change, and eventual village abandonment.

=== War, plague, crisis ===
Morin, who published radiocarbon dates of material at the house pits sites, concluded that the highest population densities were between 1550 and 1150 BP (400 AD and 800 AD) with a maximum around 1200 BP (750 AD). He argues that Keatley Creek's drastic population decline began in the ninth century. By 950 BP (1000 AD) the Keatley Creek site's population was barely half that of three centuries before. Also skeptical of a single catastrophic crisis, Morin also looks at internal contradictions in Mid-Fraser society. Although little evidence exists for warfare, it may have increased with the introduction of the bow and arrow, as elsewhere in the interior plains. Morin and others have suggested as well that variability in salmon populations could have been coupled with the reality that a more densely settled population is vulnerable to disease.

=== Summary ===
Summarizing the common ground in the discussion, Morin and others have written:

Rather than a static, timeless picture of the aboriginal past, research in the Mid-Fraser offers a glimpse of the rich history of these peoples and their settlements [like Keatley Creek]. Briefly, this history included the development of many large villages with population densities along the Mid-Fraser greatly exceeding those at contact or even today and the abandonment of such settlements at least six centuries before contact. The history of these communities was undoubtedly marked by the founding of new villages; the rise and fall of powerful lineages and chiefs; the shifting of alliances between chiefs, lineages, villages, and distant trading partners; the spread of new technologies and rituals; periods of strife and peace; and others of plenty and dearth. Although archaeology can illuminate no more than an outline of this rich and varied history, researchers will continue to question current understandings of and add information about the long and extraordinary human past of this remarkable region.

== Heritage resource classification ==
The significance of Keatley Creek's cultural heritage is especially important for local First Nations peoples, who have striven to overcome over a century of colonial policies aimed at forms of cultural destruction and genocide, and to reclaim their history, language and identities, as well as sovereignty and self-determination.

Since Keatley Creek was home to a large community for an extremely long time, it is extremely important for archaeological study, representing the culmination of centuries of human experimentation with housepit living. The site contributes to the bank of knowledge regarding North American history and communities. It suggests a past that was more socioeconomically or politically complex and more culturally diverse than previously recorded. Today the site is also recognized as a special heritage resource for the province of British Columbia.

Keatley Creek has also been described as "a world heritage quality site". It earned this distinction not only because its excavation is important for understanding the development of complex hunting and gathering cultures, but also because it is well-preserved, clearly visible, and easily accessible from a nearby highway. The Keatley Creek Site includes well-defined architectural features and provides valuable evidence of complex socioeconomic organization. Recently, the site has earned attention at a UNESCO conference hosted as part of its 2013 World Heritage Thematic Programme, at Biblioteca Palafoxiana in Mexico City.

== Bibliography ==
- Butler, Virginia L.; Chatters, James C. (1994). "The Role of Bone Density in Structuring Prehistoric Salmon Bone Assemblages". Journal of Archaeological Science. 21 (3): 413. Bibcode:1994JArSc..21..413B. doi:10.1006/jasc.1994.1039. ISSN 0305-4403. Archived from the original on 2025-04-17.
- Harris, Cole (Winter 2008). "Introduction: Considering the Middle Fraser". BC Studies: The British Columbian Quarterly (160): 3–8. doi:10.14288/bcs.v0i160.566. ISSN 0005-2949. Archived from the original on 2021-10-24.
- Hayden, Brian; Spafford, Jim (Autumn 1993). "The Keatley Creek Site and Corporate Group Archaeology". BC Studies (99): 109. doi:10.14288/BCS.V0I99.1468.
- Lepofsky, Dana; Kusmer, Karla D.; Hayden, Brian; Lertzman, Kenneth P. (Summer 1996). "Reconstructing prehistoric socioeconomies from paleoethnobotanical and zooarchaeological data: an example from the British Columbia Plateau" (PDF). Journal of Ethnobiology. 16 (1): 31–62. Archived (PDF) from the original on 2025-04-15.
- Middleton, William D.; Price, T. Douglas (1996). "Identification of Activity Areas by Multi-element Characterization of Sediments from Modern and Archaeological House Floors Using Inductively Coupled Plasma-atomic Emission Spectroscopy". Journal of Archaeological Science. 23 (5): 673–687. Bibcode:1996JArSc..23..673M. doi:10.1006/jasc.1996.0064. Archived from the original on 2025-04-15.
- Prentiss, Anna Marie (November 2008). "Imagining the Archaic: A View from the Middle Fraser Canyon of British Columbia" (PDF). The SAA Archaeological Record. 8 (5): 31–35. ISSN 1532-7299. Archived (PDF) from the original on 2021-09-04.
- Prentiss, Anna Marie (2012). "The Winter Village Pattern on the Plateau of Northwestern North America". In Pauketat, Timothy R. (ed.). The Oxford handbook of North American archaeology. New York: Oxford University Press. pp. 173–184. ISBN 978-0-19-538011-8.
- Prentiss, Anna Marie; Kuijt, Ian (2012). People of the Middle Fraser Canyon : an archaeological history. Vancouver: UBC Press. ISBN 978-0-7748-2168-1.
