= Amsa-dong =

Coordinates: 37°33′37.78″N 127°7′48.77″E

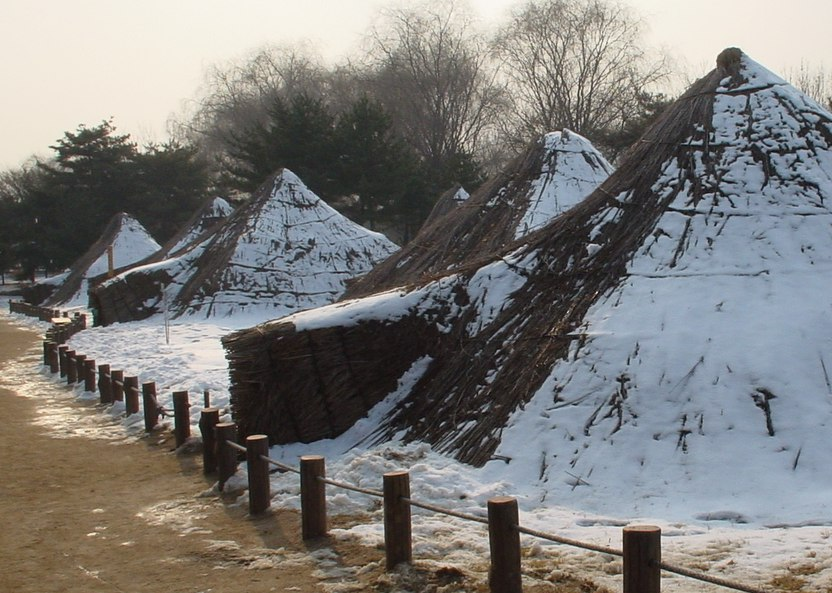
- Amsa-dong Prehistoric Settlement Site
- Interactive map of Amsa-dong
- Country: South Korea

Area
  - Total: 4.7 km^{2} (1.8 sq mi)

Population (2001)
  - Total: 73,377
  - Density: 15,612/km^{2} (40,430/sq mi)

Korean name
- Hangul: 암사동
- Hanja: 岩寺洞
- RR: Amsa-dong
- MR: Amsa-dong

Amsa-dong (Korean: 암사동) is a dong (neighbourhood) of Gangdong District, Seoul, South Korea. The dong is well known for the Amsa-dong Prehistoric Settlement Site, in which Neolithic remains were excavated after a large amount of diagonal-line patterned earthenware(빗살무늬토기) was exposed by a flood in 1925. It is thought to be a Jomonic settlement which existed prior to the spread of Songgukri-cultural sphere in Korean peninsula during the Korean bronze age. In Amsa Sam-dong, a festival named Amsa sunsa cultural festival is hold annually and parade is performed. It has a subway station of Seoul metropolitan subway 8th line, which functions as the last station of the line. There is only one high school in Amsa-dong named Sunsa highschool. The neighborhood is also known for its large traditional market. Amsa dong is divided in three, Amsa il-dong, Amsa I-dong, Amsa Sam-dong, and community centre is present in every one of these divisions.

== See also ==
- Prehistory of Korea
- Jeulmun Pottery Period
- Dolmen
- Administrative divisions of South Korea
