= Glen Fraser =

Coordinates: 50°49′00″N 121°51′00″W

Glen Fraser is a locality in the central Fraser Canyon of the Central Interior of British Columbia, Canada, located c. 18 miles north of the town of Lillooet and between the communities of Fountain (S) and Pavilion. It is a ranching area formed of benchlands on the west side of the Fraser and is the location of the Keatley Creek Archaeological Site, one of Canada's most important ongoing investigations. The name was conferred as that of a railway stop on the Pacific Great Eastern Railway, now Canadian National.
