= British Columbia Highway 99 =

Provincial highway in British Columbia, Canada

Highway 99
- Vancouver–Blaine Freeway; Granville Street; Sea to Sky Highway; Duffey Lake Road
- A map of southwestern British Columbia with Highway 99 highlighted in red

Route information
- Maintained by the Ministry of Transportation and Infrastructure
- Length: 377 km (234 mi)
- Existed: 1940–present

Major junctions
- South end: I-5 at the U.S. border in Surrey
- Highway 91 in Delta; Highway 17 in Delta; Highway 17A in Delta; Highway 91 in Richmond; Highway 7 in Vancouver; Highway 1 (TCH) in West Vancouver; Highway 12 in Lillooet
- North end: Highway 97 near Cache Creek

Location
- Country: Canada
- Province: British Columbia
- Regional districts: Metro Vancouver, Squamish-Lillooet, Thompson-Nicola
- Major cities: Delta, Surrey, Richmond, Vancouver
- Villages: Lions Bay, Pemberton

Highway system
- British Columbia provincial highways
← Highway 97D	→ Highway 101

Highway 99 is a provincial highway in British Columbia that runs 377 kilometres (234 miles) from the Canada–United States border to near Cache Creek, serving Greater Vancouver and the Squamish–Lillooet corridor. It is a major north–south artery within British Columbia's largest city, Vancouver, and connects the city with several suburbs as well as the U.S. border, where it continues south to Seattle as Interstate 5. The central section of the highway, also known as the "Sea to Sky Highway", serves the communities of Squamish, Whistler, and Pemberton. Highway 99 continues through Lillooet and ends at a junction with Highway 97 near Cache Creek.

The highway's number, assigned in 1940, was derived from former U.S. Route 99, the predecessor to Interstate 5 and a major route for the U.S. West Coast. Highway 99 originally comprised the King George Highway in Surrey, portions of Kingsway from New Westminster to Vancouver, and local streets. It was extended across the Lions Gate Bridge and to Horseshoe Bay in the 1950s along a new highway that would later be incorporated into Highway 1 (the Trans-Canada Highway), which has a concurrency with Highway 99 in West Vancouver.

Highway 99 was later moved to freeway sections in southern Surrey, Delta, and Richmond that opened beginning in the late 1950s. These sections, which included the George Massey Tunnel under the Fraser River, were numbered as Highway 499 until 1973. The highway's northern section was extended several times between 1959 and 1992 with the opening of routes beyond Whistler and Pemberton. For the 2010 Winter Olympics hosted by Vancouver and Whistler, the Sea to Sky Highway was rebuilt to increase safety and capacity—both of which had been longstanding issues with the highway as recreational and commercial traffic increased in the late 20th century. In 2006, The Guardian newspaper from the United Kingdom listed the Sea to Sky as the fifth best road trip worldwide.

== Route description ==
=== South Surrey to Richmond ===
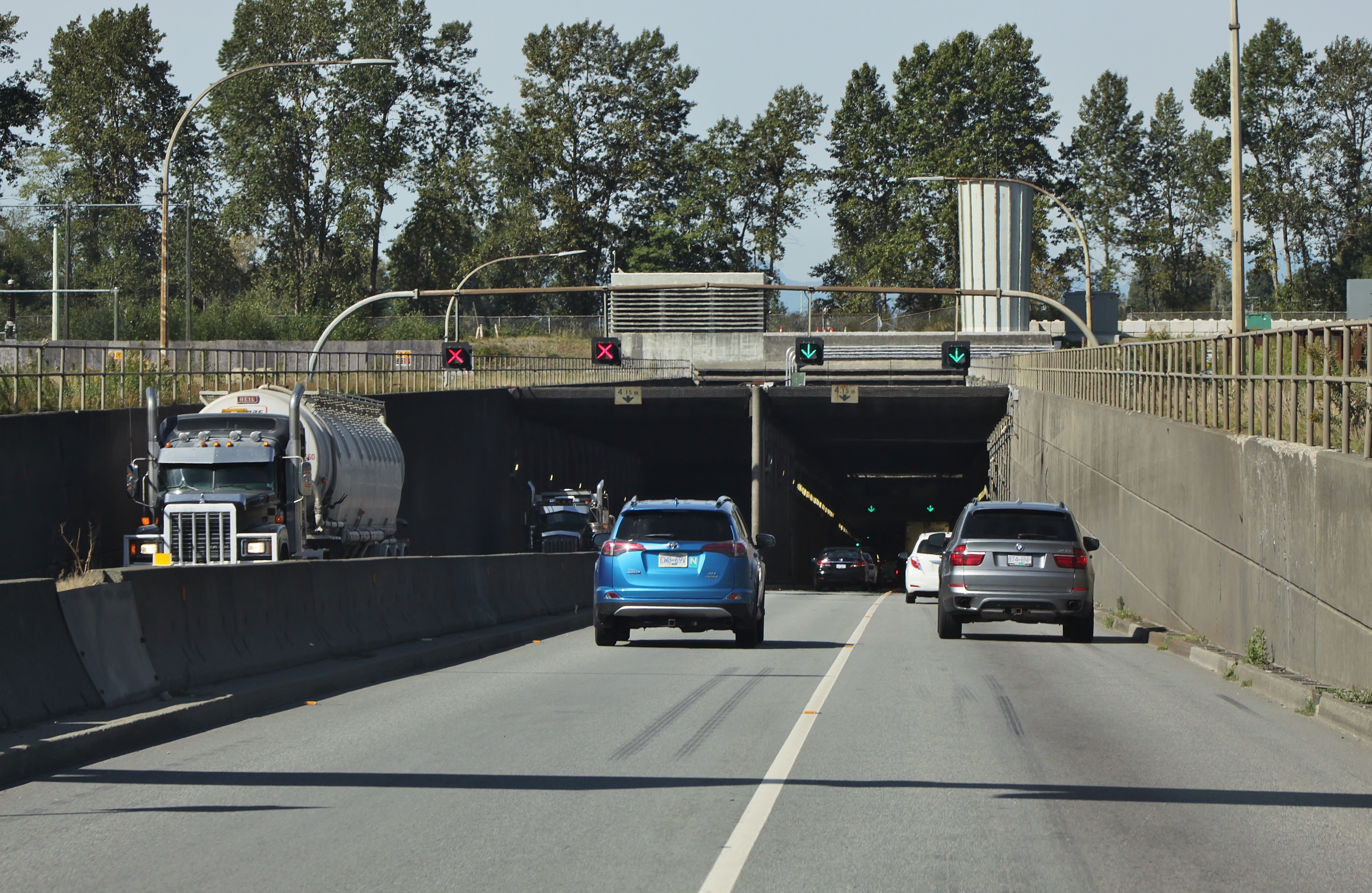
South portal of the George Massey Tunnel, which carries Highway 99 into Richmond

The southern terminus of Highway 99 is at the Peace Arch Border Crossing on the international border between the Canadian province of British Columbia and the U.S. state of Washington. It is a continuation of Interstate 5, a freeway that continues south towards Seattle, Portland, and San Diego on the West Coast of the United States, ultimately ending near Tijuana, Mexico. The highway passes the Peace Arch monument in the international park of the same name and travels north through a 24-hour customs facility operated by the Canada Border Services Agency in Douglas, part of southern Surrey on Boundary Bay. The freeway travels northwest with four lanes around the city of White Rock and through residential neighbourhoods in Surrey on the south side of the Nicomekl River. Beyond the river, Highway 99 gains a northbound bus lane on its shoulder and traverses farmland as it turns west along the shoreline of Boundary Bay.

The freeway follows Boundary Bay into the city of Delta and intersects Highway 91, which connects to New Westminster and provides an alternative route to Richmond. Highway 99 continues west through a junction with Ladner Trunk Road (formerly Highway 10) to reach an interchange with Highway 17, which travels to Tsawwassen, its major ferry terminal, and its freight hub. The freeway turns northwest and passes through a junction with Highway 17A before it enters the George Massey Tunnel, which travels under the South Arm of the Fraser River from Deas Island to Richmond. The tunnel has four lanes, of which one is able to reverse on a set schedule to provide a third lane in the peak direction of travel.

Within Richmond, Highway 99 travels north with six lanes and bus shoulders through an interchange with the Steveston Highway and a rural area. It then reaches a second junction with Highway 91 that bisects the Richmond Nature Park and includes ramps to Alderbridge Way and Knight Street. The freeway turns northwest and passes through a residential neighbourhood to reach an interchange with Sea Island Way, which provides a connection to Vancouver International Airport, Sea Island, and the Bridgeport transit hub. After crossing the Canada Line, Highway 99 crosses the Fraser River on the Oak Street Bridge, which carries four lanes into the City of Vancouver.

=== Vancouver ===
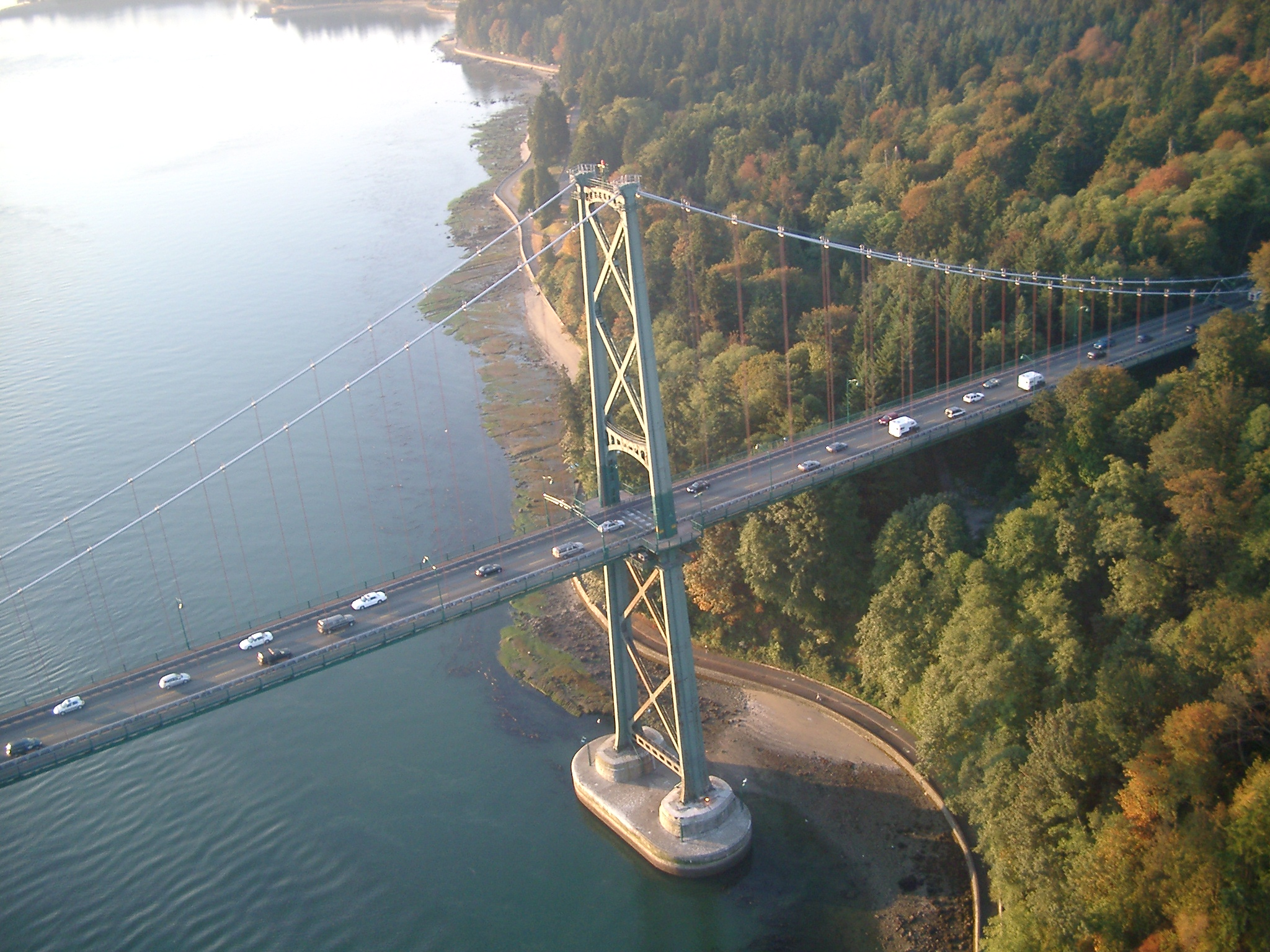
Aerial view of the Lions Gate Bridge, which carries Highway 99 between Vancouver and West Vancouver.

The freeway section of Highway 99 ends at an interchange with Marine Drive on the north end of the Oak Street Bridge in Vancouver's Marpole neighbourhood. Within Vancouver, the highway travels for 30 km (19 mi) on various city streets that are maintained by the city government and are also served by TransLink buses. The highway briefly travels north on Oak Street and turns west onto West 70th Avenue (Note: A left turn from Oak Street onto 70th Avenue is not permitted, but a right turn from 70th Avenue onto Oak Street is permitted.) through several residential blocks. Highway 99 then turns north onto Granville Street, which it follows for seven kilometres (4.3 mi) through residential neighbourhoods and a commercial district near its junction with Broadway, which carries the westernmost section of Highway 7.

The highway travels onto the Granville Bridge, which carries eight lanes of traffic over False Creek and Granville Island into Downtown Vancouver. The bridge includes ramps on its south side to West 4th Avenue and other streets, as well as an interchange on its north side with loop ramps that connect to Pacific Boulevard and Pacific Street. Highway 99 passes over the University Canada West campus and splits into a pair of one-way streets: Seymour Street for northbound traffic and Howe Street for southbound traffic; the two streets are split by Granville Street, which continues as a transit mall for TransLink buses.

Seymour and Howe streets pass through residential and commercial areas in Downtown Vancouver, which include department stores, the Vancouver Art Gallery, Robson Square, the CF Pacific Centre, and several SkyTrain stations. Highway 99 turns west onto Georgia Street and returns to bi-directional traffic as it traverses the West End near Vancouver's central waterfront. The street carries four lanes for general purpose traffic and two lanes shared by buses and bicycles during daytime hours; beyond Pender Street, it gains a center reversible lane that is controlled with traffic signals. The highway then travels through Stanley Park with three lanes–one per direction and a centre reversible lane—and crosses the Lions Gate Bridge over the First Narrows as it leaves Vancouver.

=== West Vancouver and Sea to Sky Highway ===
The Lions Gate Bridge continues into West Vancouver and bisects X̱wemelch'stn, an Indian reserve managed by the Squamish Nation. Highway 99 briefly travels west onto Marine Drive after an interchange and crosses the Capilano River to the Park Royal Shopping Centre, where it turns north onto Taylor Way. The highway then passes through a residential neighbourhood and reaches an interchange with Highway 1, part of the Trans-Canada Highway. Highway 99 joins Highway 1 on the Upper Levels Highway, a four-lane freeway that travels west through residential neighbourhoods on the south side of Cypress Mountain. The freeway makes several gradual turns as it ascends the foothills of Cypress Mountain; Highway 1 splits from the highway to serve the Horseshoe Bay ferry terminal, a major hub for BC Ferries in Horseshoe Bay, as it continues onward to Vancouver Island.

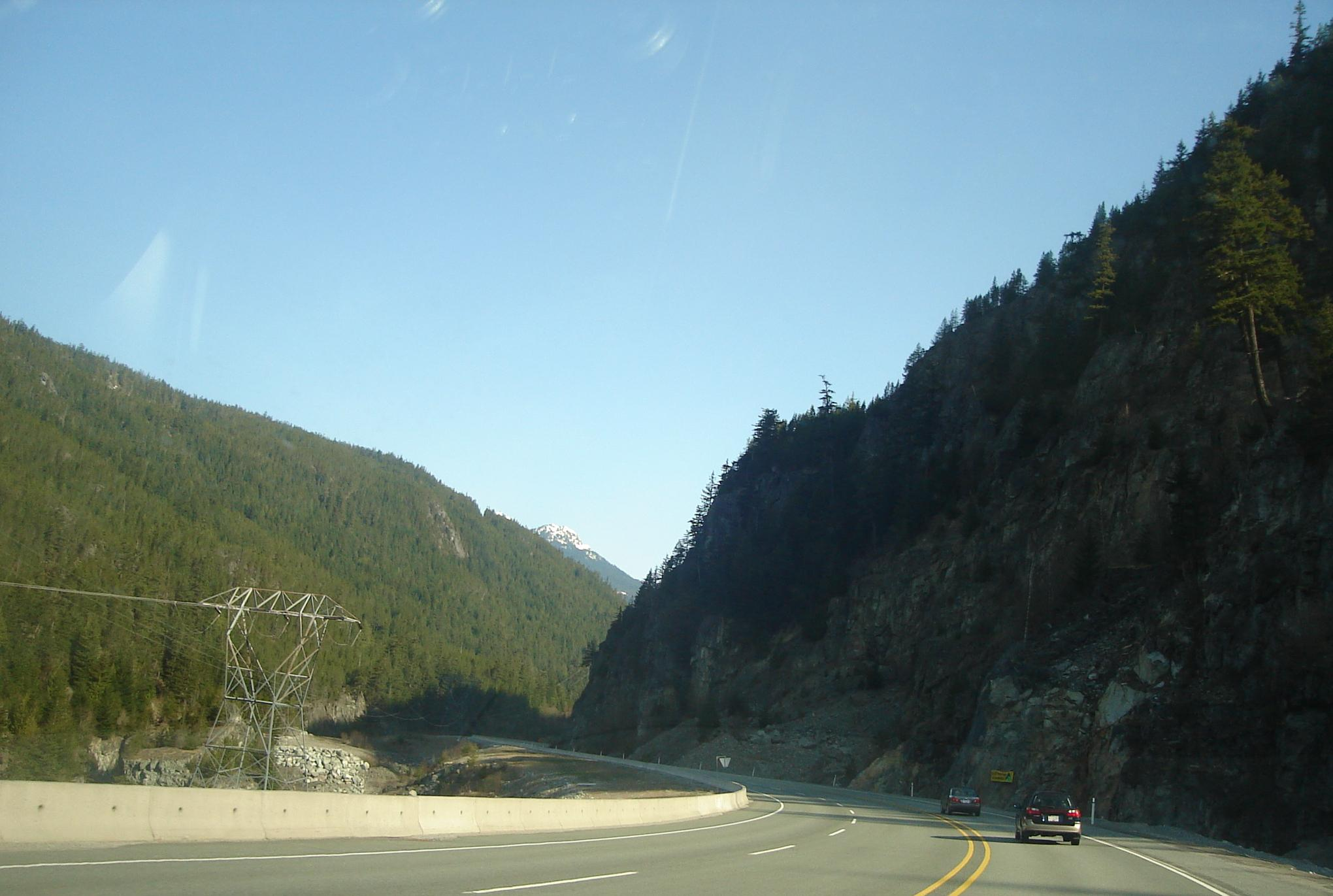
Highway 99 north of Squamish

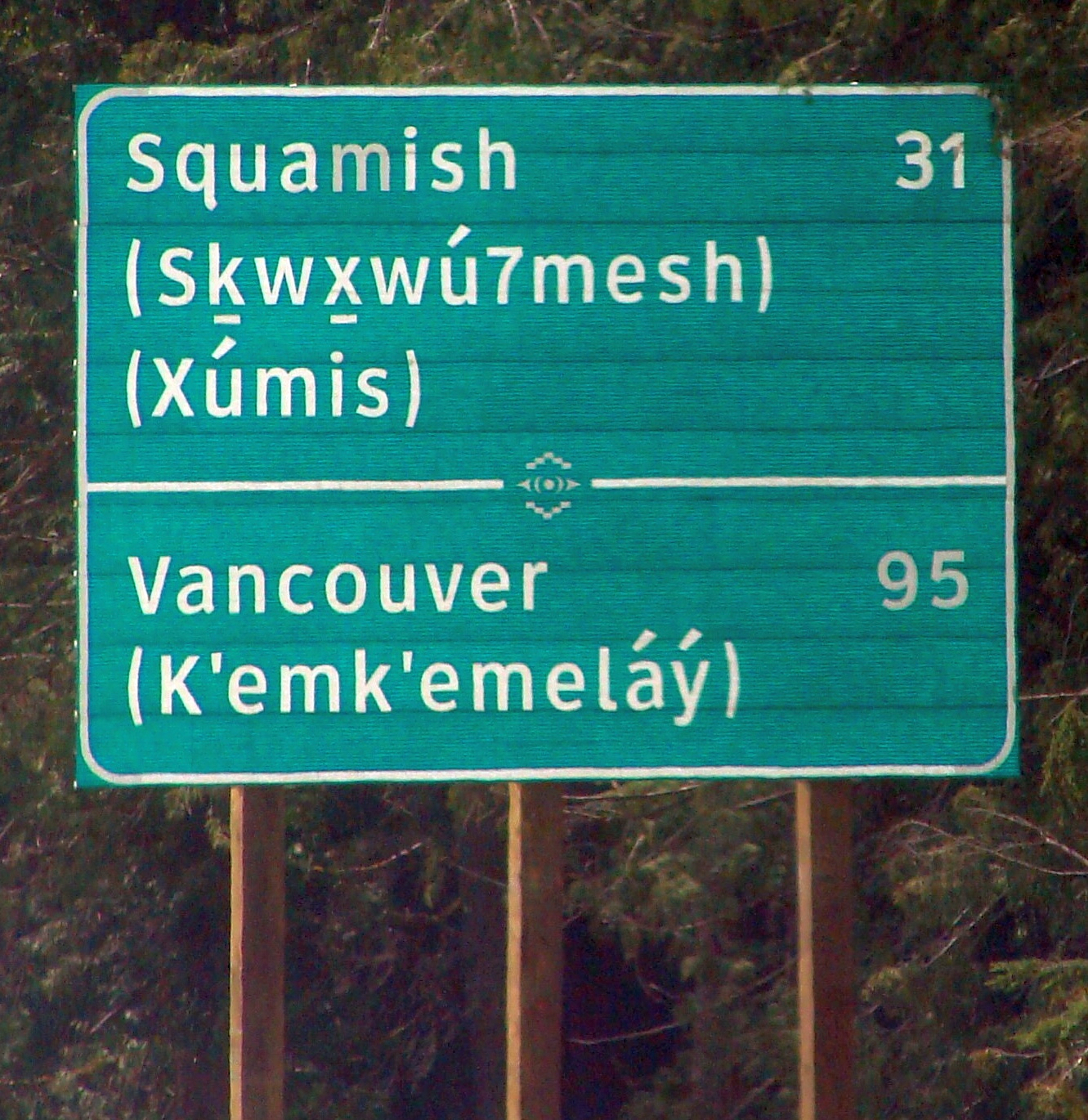
Signage on Highway 99 in English and Squamish

The "Sea to Sky Highway" is the name given to the 134-kilometre (83 mi) long section of Highway 99 from Horseshoe Bay to Pemberton, a province-designated scenic highway and tourist attraction. The Horseshoe Bay–Whistler section is also named the Sea to Sky Cultural Journey as part of a collaboration between the provincial government, the Squamish Nation, and Lilʼwat First Nation prior to the 2010 Winter Olympics. The highway has special paddle-shaped highway markers, bilingual signs with place names in the Squamish language (Sḵwx̱wú7mesh), and seven information kiosks which are designed to represent Coast Salish woven cedar hats.

From Horseshoe Bay, the four-lane, divided highway travels along the eastern coast of Howe Sound and the foothills of the North Shore Mountains. Highway 99 follows the BC Rail mainline, which runs below along the coastline, and narrows to a two-lane, undivided highway at Tunnel Point north of Lions Bay; the point also marks the boundary between Greater Vancouver and the Squamish–Lillooet Regional District. The highway then continues north with occasional passing lanes and divided sections, as well as scenic viewpoints and rest areas, and later reverts to a limited access roadway as it descends into Britannia Beach, home to the Britannia Mine Museum.

Highway 99 travels northeast through Murrin Provincial Park as it ascends a hill to bypass Watts Point, an extinct volcanic centre on Howe Sound. The highway then descends along the coast towards Squamish at the head of Howe Sound. It passes a ferry terminal at Darrell Bay and the viewpoint for Shannon Falls, the third-highest waterfall in the province at 335 metres (1,099 ft). Highway 99 passes under Stawamus Chief, a large mountain immediately outside of Squamish, and travels through the city's residential neighbourhoods. It bypasses downtown to serve a commercial and industrial area on the north side of the city and briefly turns northeast to cross the Mamquam River. The highway continues north along the Squamish River through Cheakamus Canyon towards Whistler and then onward to Pemberton, where the "Sea to Sky Highway" designation ends. The corridor is also home to the Sea to Sky Trail, a multi-use trail for hiking and cycling that runs from Squamish to D'Arcy north of Pemberton.

=== Duffey Lake Road ===
Highway 99 continues on Duffey Lake Road from Pemberton to Lillooet. This section of road parallels several rivers and water bodies, including the Squamish River, the Cheakamus River, and Daisy Lake, which flow south toward Howe Sound. In Whistler, near Alta Lake, the road crosses a watershed, and north of this point, the road follows the Green River and Lillooet River which flow north and east toward Lillooet Lake, and ultimately towards the Fraser River. The speed limit of the Sea to Sky Highway ranges from 80 to 100 kilometres per hour (50 to 62 mph), with 60-kilometre-per-hour (37 mph) sections in Lions Bay, Britannia Beach and parts of Squamish.

After passing Lillooet Lake, the highway climbs a steep grade to Joffre Lakes Provincial Park, and shortly after passes through Cayoosh Pass, the highest point on the highway at 1,275 metres (4,183 ft). East of the pass the road follows the course of Cayoosh Creek as it traverses the southern base of Mount Rohr and skirts Duffey Lake Provincial Park. As Duffey Lake Road, after winding almost 99 km (62 mi) northeast in very steep mountains where sometimes the advisory speed limit is 20 km/h (12 mph), and is legally posted as 60 km/h (37 mph) throughout. Highway 99 reaches the junction with Highway 12 at Lillooet, and then goes northeast for another 75 km (47 mi) to its northern terminus at its junction with Highway 97 just north of Cache Creek and just south of Clinton.

== History ==
=== King George Highway ===
The modern-day highways between the Peace Arch Border Crossing and New Westminster generally follow the Semiahmoo Trail, an overland route used by indigenous Coast Salish peoples that was later adopted by fur traders and early non-indigenous Fraser Valley settlers in the 1860s. The trail was replaced with a wagon road that was completed by the provincial government in 1879. The Pacific Highway was later built in the 1910s to connect Vancouver to Seattle and the rest of the U.S. West Coast and marked by the Peace Arch, a monument dedicated in 1921 to commemorate the Treaty of Ghent. The highway was later given number designations: U.S. Route 99 in Washington was created as part of the United States Numbered Highway System in 1926; and "Route R" in British Columbia was created in the 1930s.

Construction of a modern highway to link Vancouver with the U.S. border, initially named the "Peace Arch Highway", began in 1931 with the establishment of a work camp in Surrey. The new highway would bypass a hilly section of the Pacific Highway south of Kingsway in Cloverdale and be built with future expansion to four lanes. The city of Burnaby later began planning for a new corridor to parallel Kingsway in lieu of widening the existing street, which was followed by a plan by New Westminster to improve its section of the highway; local officials in Delta requested the construction of a new highway to link the Peace Arch to Ladner and Lulu Island (modern-day Richmond). By July 1938, construction on all sections of the 23-kilometre (14 mi) highway between the Peace Arch and the Pattullo Bridge into New Westminster was underway. The first sections of the unpaved highway were opened in June 1939 and the gravel surfacing was completed from the Nicomekl River to New Westminster in October.

The new roadway was renamed for King George VI and numbered "Highway 99" by the provincial government to match U.S. Route 99 to the south; a special purple-and-gold highway shield with the letters "G.R." was designed for Highway 99. The 27-kilometre (17 mi) King George VI Highway was dedicated by the provincial government at the Peace Arch on October 16, 1940, and cost $800,000 to construct. It had two fully paved lanes and featured a maximum grade of 4 percent between the U.S. border and the Pattullo Bridge. Highway 99 continued northwest on Kingsway, which it shared with Highway 1, through New Westminster to Downtown Vancouver and ended at the edge of Stanley Park.

=== Vancouver–Squamish Highway ===
Highway 99 was extended to West Vancouver in 1956, crossing the existing Lions Gate Bridge across the First Narrows of the Burrard Inlet, and continued along Marine Drive and Taylor Drive for 1.1 km (0.7 mi) to the new Upper Levels Highway. The Lions Gate Bridge opened in 1938 and was operated by the Guinness family until it was purchased by the provincial government in 1955; it was tolled until 1963. The 16-kilometre (10 mi), two-lane, undivided Upper Levels Highway opened on September 14, 1957, between Taylor Way in West Vancouver and Horseshoe Bay. It cost $1.3 million to construct and replaced a winding coastal section of Marine Drive, but initially lacked guardrails and other safety features due to a rushed opening. Taylor Way was later widened to four lanes in early 1958 to handle increased traffic to the Upper Levels Highway, which was extended east to the Second Narrows Bridge in 1961 and signed as part of the Trans-Canada Highway (Highway 1).

The bridge acquisition and Upper Levels Highway construction were part of the provincial government's plan to complete the Vancouver–Squamish Highway, which would open vehicular access beyond Horseshoe Bay. The new highway was built alongside the government-owned Pacific Great Eastern Railway (now BC Rail), which completed an extension along Howe Sound to Squamish on August 27, 1956, to connect with an existing route to Prince George. Both corridors were preceded by the Lillooet Cattle Trail, a wagon trail established in 1877 and used for a decade until it was replaced by inland railroads. Surveyors began work in 1949 to find a suitable route along Howe Sound to link existing roads that ended at Whytecliff (overlooking Horseshoe Bay) and Britannia Beach.

Two competing routes emerged in the early 1950s: one following the Howe Sound coastline at a cost of approximately $6 million; and another that would travel north along the Capilano River from West Vancouver for 24 km (15 mi) and cross over a pass at 580 m (1,900 ft) to follow Furry Creek to Britannia at an initial cost of $3.5 million. The Howe Sound route had been criticised for its higher cost and complexity due to the rugged terrain and parallel railroad; at the time, an unpaved road along the Capilano–Furry route was passable for some traffic but a full highway would require steeper grades that would not be accessible during parts of the winter. Planning was delayed for several years by the provincial government to negotiate with the Greater Vancouver Water District, who opposed the Capilano–Furry route due to its potential effects on the protected drinking water source for the city. The water district also cited the need for a filtration plant to prevent highway debris and pollutants from contaminating the basin, which would cost up to $12 million. On May 18, 1954, the provincial cabinet announced that the Vancouver–Squamish Highway would be constructed along the Howe Sound route to a width of 10 m (34 ft) at an unspecified cost.

The 13-kilometre (8 mi) section between Britannia and Squamish had already been built by 1950 and improved later that year with $15,000 in funding to bypass a steep segment with 10–15 percent grades. Construction of a nine-point-seven-kilometre (6 mi) section north of Horseshoe Bay began in early 1955 under the same contractor as a parallel section of the Pacific Great Eastern Railway. The provincial government also announced plans to build a highway extension to serve Garibaldi Provincial Park north of Squamish, the site of planned tourist development and a potential national park, in early 1956. Two more contracts were awarded by the end of the year and construction on all 32 km (20 mi) of the highway was underway by March 1956. Work on the highway began with clearing and explosive blasting of rock faces above the railway, which was protected by wooden boards laid over the tracks. An estimated 9.5 million tonnes (21,000,000,000 lb) of material was blasted or excavated for the highway project, which was delayed by a year due to the reassignment of labour to finish the Pacific Great Eastern Railway.

External media
- Photolog: Highway 99 from Horseshoe Bay to Squamish (1966)

The Vancouver–Squamish Highway, officially named the "Seaview Highway", was dedicated and opened to traffic on August 7, 1958, with 600 cars queued to drive the completed 48-kilometre (30 mi) route from Horseshoe Bay to Squamish. The majority of the two-lane highway was paved in July through a rush order from the provincial government to complete a preliminary surface, while 24 km (15 mi) between Britannia and Squamish remained a gravel road with steeper grades and narrower turns. The project cost a total of $11 million to construct and was expected to attract investment in a planned ski resort at the base of Garibaldi Mountain. The new highway was later furnished with guard rails, curbs, and culverts within a few weeks of opening; the paved and gravelled sections developed large potholes within a month of opening, which required additional construction.

The provincial government announced plans pave the Britannia–Squamish section and extend the highway to Pemberton and Lillooet by 1965 following requests from local business leaders. The existing route from Squamish to Lillooet was 90 km (56 mi) long and mostly unpaved, with some sections that required vehicles with four-wheel drive to negotiate the terrain. Construction of an all-season gravel road to Alta Lake at the base of Whistler Mountain was announced in March 1962 as part of a larger development plan for a ski area that could host the Winter Olympics. By the following June, four-wheel drive vehicles were able to access Alta Lake via the rudimentary gravel road, but it remained closed to the public. The Alta Lake extension was completed in time for the opening of the Whistler Blackcomb ski area on January 15, 1966, which brought more traffic to the highway. A bypass of Squamish opened in March 1966 and the section to Alta Lake was paved by the end of the year. A resort town on the highway, named Whistler, was developed in the late 1970s and 1980s at the base of the mountain near Alta Lake.

An unpaved extension to Pemberton was opened in 1965 and described as being of a "reasonable driving standard" by the Minister of Recreation. In 1969, the rebuilt and paved Britannia–Squamish section of Highway 99 opened at a cost of $2.5 million. The highway was occasionally closed during winters due to washouts, floods, and rockslides that required explosives to clear. The paved highway was extended to Pemberton and Mount Currie by 1975.

=== Vancouver–Blaine Freeway construction ===
In 1953, Minister of Public Works Phil Gaglardi proposed a four-lane freeway that would connect the U.S. border to Vancouver via Richmond's Lulu Island with a connection to Vancouver International Airport. The proposal would extend Highway 99 and incorporate the Oak Street Bridge, a new road crossing of the Fraser River's North Arm that replaced the aging Marpole Bridge in 1957. Specific routing plans were kept a "closely-guarded secret" by the provincial government to prevent land speculation from increasing costs; Gaglardi also proposed financing the new highway as a limited-access tollway that would eventually continue through Vancouver to the Lions Gate Bridge and Upper Levels Highway. A survey team was dispatched to find a location for the envisioned freeway to cross the Fraser River's South Arm and four candidate sites were identified in early 1955: Port Mann in Surrey, Annacis Island near New Westminster, Deas Island near Ladner, and Tilbury Island.

A tunnel at the Deas Island site, which would replace an existing ferry and cost up to $17 million, was announced as the winning option in February 1956 following a recommendation from a contracted engineering firm. Construction began with a ceremonial cement pouring overseen by premier W. A. C. Bennett in May 1957 and was conducted using a set of six concrete immersed tubes that were constructed on the shore. The Deas Island Tunnel and its 12.1-kilometre (7.5 mi) section approaches on Lulu Island and near Ladner were opened for a preview weekend beginning May 23, 1959, where it attracted 133,000 vehicles. The tunnel was formally dedicated by Queen Elizabeth II on July 15, 1959, and later renamed the George Massey Tunnel. Tolls were collected at both the four-lane tunnel and the Oak Street Bridge until March 31, 1964.

A regional freeway network for Greater Vancouver was proposed by a provincial government report in April 1959 and included a six-lane freeway that followed Arbutus Street from the Oak Street Bridge to a loop around Downtown Vancouver that connected to the Lions Gate Bridge. The freeway alignment of Highway 99 between 8th Avenue in South Surrey and the North Arm of the Fraser River opened in 1962 and was originally named the Deas (Island) Throughway. Between 1964 and 1973, the freeway alignment of Highway 99 was designated Highway 499; the old alignment was redesignated as Highway 99A. The four-lane, 35-kilometre (22 mi) freeway between the Deas Island Tunnel and the U.S. border was opened on May 29, 1962, by premier Bennett and Washington Governor Albert D. Rosellini. It cost $57 million to construct and was funded by the provincial government.

=== Lillooet extension and other projects ===
An unpaved logging road from Pemberton Valley to Lillooet, later named Duffey Lake Road, was built in the 1960s and opened to limited recreational use in 1972. The 90-kilometre (56 mi) road was widened to a width of 7.3 m (24 feet) and opened to the public on weekends and outside of logging periods to access recreational areas and bypass the congested Fraser Canyon highways. The provincial government provided funding for maintenance for several years before formally taking control on April 1, 1979. Early concepts for an extension of Highway 99 to Lillooet in the 1960s included a 39-kilometre (24 mi) ferry to cross Anderson and Seton lakes.

Paving of Duffey Lake Road began in 1990 and was mostly completed by the end of the following year at a cost of $22.5 million. During construction, a group from the Lil'wat First Nation blockaded the road at Mount Currie during a conflict with Lillooet residents and authorities; the nine-kilometre (5.6 mi) section through the community was left unpaved for several years. The paved section was incorporated into an extension of Highway 99 in 1992. A section of Highway 12 between Lillooet and Highway 97 was also re-numbered 99. The portion of the highway between Lillooet and Pavilion was part of the route of the Old Cariboo Road, which was developed in the 1850s and 1860s during the Fraser Canyon Gold Rush.

=== Olympics upgrades and later history ===
The Horseshoe Bay–Pemberton section of Highway 99 was renamed the Sea to Sky Highway in the 1980s and remained a two-lane undivided highway with various safety issues. It had no outside barrier to prevent vehicles from falling off the steep cliff overlooking Howe Sound or to prevent rocks from overhead bluffs from hitting the highway. Fatalities on the section were attributed to inclement weather conditions that changed rapidly, poor visibility, excessive speed, drunk drivers, and difficulty in passing slower vehicles. From 1998 to 2004, the highway had an annual average of 574 collisions or accidents with eight fatalities per year—far higher than a comparable highway in the province.

A major reconstruction of the highway, including widening sections to four lanes between Horseshoe Bay and Squamish, was proposed by political leaders in 1981 following the death of nine people who had driven off a washed out wooden bridge over M Creek. At the time, the Sea to Sky Highway had five wooden bridges that had yet to be replaced. The provincial government announced a $110 million plan to improve the highway, which was outfitted with passing lanes and new bridges by the end of the decade.

As part of the Vancouver–Whistler bid for the 2010 Winter Olympics, the provincial government authorized an upgrade of the highway to accommodate greater traffic loads, widening the highway and adding a concrete divider. The bid also considered a new highway to bypass parts of the corridor, including a tunnel under Grouse Mountain or a toll road through Indian Arm, but they were not advanced for further planning. A large section had already been upgraded between Squamish and Whistler in 2002, prior to the Olympics being awarded, to improve upon work done during the 1980s. The Sea to Sky is a freeway from the interchange with Highway 1 to the at-grade intersection with Lawrence Way. After that, there are sporadic interchanges and at-grade intersections. It is mostly a divided highway all the way to Lions Bay and through Squamish. The project cost $600 million and included the construction of large retaining walls, wider bridges able to withstand earthquakes, and mesh screens for rockfalls. The section was added to the National Highway System in 2004. Several bilingual signs with place names in the Squamish language (Sḵwx̱wú7mesh) and special highway markers shaped like paddles were also installed on Highway 99 by April 2009 as part of the project.

On-site protests delayed part of the construction, especially near wildlife habitats in the Eagleridge Bluffs of West Vancouver. Protesters claimed that a tunnel was a safer and environmentally friendlier alternative. A court injunction and police were used to remove the protestors, one of whom, Harriet Nahanee, a respected Squamish elder, died soon after in the Surrey Pre-Trial Centre from health complications alleged to be related to her arrest and incarceration. Plans to build a new highway through West Vancouver to directly connect the Lions Gate Bridge to the Upper Levels Freeway were rejected by the provincial government following a study that determined it would not be cost-effective. As a result of the highway reconstruction, crashes on the section dropped by 66 percent; communities along the corridor also saw significant population growth, in part because the highway made longer commutes more viable.

During the Olympic Games, a checkpoint was installed on Highway 99 near Squamish to inspect travellers to Whistler, who were required to present a valid permit for parking provided by their hotel or issued to residents and workers. Shuttle buses ran between Vancouver and Whistler for spectators and other visitors during the Olympics.

=== Future plans ===
In 2006, the provincial government announced the Gateway Program, a major regional transportation plan that would include a replacement for the George Massey Tunnel. Under the plan, the tunnel would be tolled and twinned to add an additional lane in each direction, but it was given a lower priority due to its potential effects of moving traffic bottlenecks to the Oak Street and Knight Street bridges. The twinning proposal was one of several options considered during a public consultation in 2012, which resulted in a new proposal from Liberal premier Christy Clark to build a ten-lane toll bridge that would cost $3.5 billion to construct. Following the 2017 election, the New Democratic Party announced the cancellation of the bridge proposal and commissioned an independent review with alternative plans. A plan to build an eight-lane immersed tube tunnel with dedicated transit, bicycle, and pedestrian access was announced in August 2021. It is planned to be completed in 2030 at a cost of $4.15 billion.

Proposals to build an alternative Burrard Inlet road crossing to replace the Lions Gate Bridge have been announced by various business groups and political leaders since the 1930s, with more serious studies undertaken in the late 1960s and early 1970s. The NDP government in the mid-1990s also considered a tunnel, but chose instead to re-deck the Lions Gate Bridge with work completed in 2001. The project also included widening of the Stanley Park Causeway and the removal of trees in the park, which caused protests from environmental groups. The Vancouver Park Board approved of an agreement with TransLink, the city and provincial governments, and ICBC in 2000 to allow the widening on the condition that private vehicular traffic on the causeway and Lions Gate Bridge would be banned in 2030 if a new crossing were built. The agreement was not included in the final contract, but a closure of the bridge to vehicular traffic is listed in the City of Vancouver's 2040 plan.

== Major intersections ==
Regional District	Location	km	mi	Exit	Destinations	Notes
Metro Vancouver	Surrey	0.00	0.00	—	I-5 south – Bellingham, Seattle	Continues into Washington
Metro Vancouver	Surrey	0.00	0.00	Canada – United States border at Peace Arch Border Crossing		
Metro Vancouver	Surrey	0.60	0.37	1	Beach Road	At-grade intersection
Metro Vancouver	Surrey	1.60	0.99	2	8th Avenue (Highway 901:3188 east) to Highway 1 / Highway 15 – USA Border, Pacific X-ing, White Rock	Signed as exits 2A (east) and 2B (west) southbound; former Highway 99A north
Metro Vancouver	Surrey	3.41	2.12	4	16th Avenue	
Metro Vancouver	Surrey	7.27	4.52	8A	152nd Street south	Southbound exit only
Metro Vancouver	Surrey	7.66	4.76	8B	32th Avenue / 152nd Street north	Southbound exit and northbound entrance
Metro Vancouver	Surrey	9.63	5.98	10	King George Boulevard – Surrey City Centre	No access to Highway 99 southbound from King George northbound; former Highway 99A.
Metro Vancouver	Delta	15.56	9.67	16	Highway 91 north – North Delta, New Westminster	Alternate route to Richmond and Vancouver.
Metro Vancouver	Delta	20.36	12.65	20	Ladner Trunk Road – South Delta, Surrey	Northbound access to Boundary Bay Airport; former Highway 10
Metro Vancouver	Delta	23.61	14.67	23	80th Street	Southbound exit only; access to Boundary Bay Airport
Metro Vancouver	Delta	25.37	15.76	26	Highway 17 (South Fraser Perimeter Road) to Highway 1 east – Tsawwassen ferry terminal, Hope	Highway 17 exit 13; no direct access from Highway 99 north to Highway 17 east; BC Ferries to Victoria and Nanaimo
Metro Vancouver	Delta	27.86	17.31	28	Highway 17A south / River Road – Ladner	
Metro Vancouver	Delta	28.60	17.77	29	River Road south	Southbound exit only
South Arm Fraser River		29.55– 30.41	18.36– 18.90	George Massey Tunnel		
Metro Vancouver	Richmond	31.59	19.63	32	Steveston Highway	
Metro Vancouver	Richmond	35.68	22.17	36	Westminster Highway	Northbound exit and southbound entrance
Metro Vancouver	Richmond	36.71	22.81	37	Highway 91 east – North Delta, Surrey	Highway 91 exit 23; no access to Alderbridge Way
Metro Vancouver	Richmond	37.33	23.20	38	Shell Road	Southbound exit and northbound entrance
Metro Vancouver	Richmond	38.31	23.80	39B	No. 4 Road	Southbound exit only
Metro Vancouver	Richmond	38.91	24.18	39A	Sea Island Way (Highway 901:2923 east) – Airport (YVR)	No northbound exit
Metro Vancouver	Richmond	38.91	24.18	39	Bridgeport Road – Airport (YVR)	Northbound exit and entrance
North Arm Fraser River		38.91– 40.69	24.18– 25.28	Oak Street Bridge		
Metro Vancouver	Vancouver	40.69	25.28	41	Marine Drive	Signed as 41A (east) and 41B (west) northbound; no southbound exit number; freeway north end; becomes Oak Street; alternative connection between Oak Street and Granville Street
Metro Vancouver	Vancouver	40.86	25.39	South end of City of Vancouver jurisdiction		
Metro Vancouver	Vancouver	40.86	25.39		West 70th Avenue	Highway 99 officially follows 70th Avenue west; left turns prohibited; Highway 99 signed on both Oak and Granville Streets
Metro Vancouver	Vancouver	44.50	27.65		West 41st Avenue	Signed Highway 99 connection between Oak Street and Granville Street
Metro Vancouver	Vancouver	47.40	29.45		West 12th Avenue to Highway 1 (TCH) east	
Metro Vancouver	Vancouver	47.70	29.64		West Broadway (Highway 7 east)	Signed Highway 99 connection between Oak Street and Granville Street
Metro Vancouver	Vancouver	48.20	29.95		West 4th Avenue / Fir Street south	Interchange; 4th Avenue is southbound exit and northbound entrance; Fir Street is southbound exit only
Metro Vancouver	Vancouver	48.20– 49.10	29.95– 30.51	Granville Street Bridge over False Creek		
Metro Vancouver	Vancouver	49.10	30.51		Seymour Street / Howe Street Granville Street	One-way transition; northbound Highway 99 follows Seymour Street, southbound Highway 99 follows Howe Street; left exit to Granville Street
Metro Vancouver	Vancouver	49.90	31.01		Nelson Street	One-way, southeast-bound; provides access to the Cambie Bridge; to Cambie Street
Metro Vancouver	Vancouver	50.10	31.13		Smithe Street	One-way, northwest-bound; provides access from the Cambie Bridge
Metro Vancouver	Vancouver	50.30	31.25		Robson Street	
Metro Vancouver	Vancouver	50.40– 50.60	31.32– 31.44		Georgia Street Seymour Street / Howe Street	Former Highway 1A / Highway 99A south; Highway 99 follows Georgia Street; south end of former Highway 1A concurrency
Metro Vancouver	Vancouver	50.80	31.57		Burrard Street	Provides access to the Burrard Bridge
Metro Vancouver	Vancouver	52.40	32.56	North end of City of Vancouver jurisdiction • Enters Stanley Park		
Metro Vancouver	Vancouver	52.71	32.75	—	North Lagoon Drive	Grade separated; no southbound exit
Metro Vancouver	Vancouver	54.38	33.79	—	Stanley Park Drive	Grade separated; no southbound entrance; closed during peak hours
Metro Vancouver	Vancouver	54.70	33.99	Exits Stanley Park		
Burrard Inlet		54.70– 56.23	33.99– 34.94	Lions Gate Bridge		
Metro Vancouver	West Vancouver	56.52	35.12	—	Marine Drive to Capilano Road / Highway 1 (TCH) – North Vancouver	Interchange; Highway 99 follows Marine Drive
Metro Vancouver	West Vancouver	56.91	35.36		Marine Drive / Taylor Way	Highway 99 follows Taylor Way
Metro Vancouver	West Vancouver	56.96	35.39	—	Park Royal North	Southbound exit and northbound entrance
Metro Vancouver	West Vancouver	58.09	36.10	13	Highway 1 (TCH) east / Taylor Way – North Vancouver, Vancouver	Interchange; former Highway 1A western terminus; south end of Highway 1 concurrency; freeway south end; exit numbers follow Highway 1
Metro Vancouver	West Vancouver	59.72	37.11	11	15th Street / Cross Creek Road	
Metro Vancouver	West Vancouver	60.63	37.67	10	21st Street / Westhill Drive	No southbound exit
Metro Vancouver	West Vancouver	61.28	38.08	10	22nd Street	Southbound exit only
Metro Vancouver	West Vancouver	62.72	38.97	8	Cypress Bowl Road	
Metro Vancouver	West Vancouver	64.29	39.95	7	Wentworth Avenue / Westmount Road	
Metro Vancouver	West Vancouver	66.96	41.61	4	Woodgreen Drive / Headland Drive	
Metro Vancouver	West Vancouver	68.76	42.73	3	Highway 1 (TCH) west to Highway 101 – Horseshoe Bay ferry terminal, Nanaimo, Gibsons	Eagle Ridge Interchange; northbound exit and southbound entrance; north end of Highway 1 concurrency; Highway 101, Nanaimo and Gibsons are via BC Ferries; Sea to Sky Highway south end
Metro Vancouver	West Vancouver	69.37	43.10	2	Marine Drive / Eagleridge Drive (Highway 901:0513 north)	Northbound exit and southbound entrance
Metro Vancouver	West Vancouver	72.57	45.09	—	Horseshoe Bay Drive (Highway 901:2924 south) to Marine Drive	Southbound exit and northbound entrance
Metro Vancouver	West Vancouver	73.99	45.98	—	Seascape Drive / Ansell Place	U-turn route; freeway north end
Metro Vancouver	Lions Bay	80.50	50.02		Kelvin Grove Way	Interchange
Metro Vancouver	Lions Bay	81.15	50.42		Lions Bay Avenue	Interchange
Metro Vancouver	Lions Bay	83.07	51.62		Brunswick Road	Interchange
Squamish-Lillooet		92.22	57.30		Porteau Road	Interchange; U-turn route
Squamish-Lillooet		96.42– 97.95	59.91– 60.86		Furry Creek Drive	Interchange
Squamish-Lillooet	Britannia Beach	102.28	63.55		Copper Drive	To Britannia Mine Museum
Squamish-Lillooet	Squamish	113.67	70.63		Cleveland Avenue / Loggers Lane	To Downtown Squamish
Squamish-Lillooet	Squamish	116.55	72.42		Centennial Way	Interchange
Squamish-Lillooet	Squamish	121.00	75.19		Depot Road – Brackendale	
Squamish-Lillooet	Squamish	123.48	76.73		Squamish Valley Road / Alice Lake Road – Paradise Valley	To Alice Lake Provincial Park
Squamish-Lillooet		154.55	96.03		Brandywine Falls Provincial Park	
Squamish-Lillooet		157.79	98.05		Callaghan Valley Road – Whistler Olympic Park, Callaghan Lake Provincial Park	
Squamish-Lillooet	Whistler	166.46	103.43		Alta Lake Road	
Squamish-Lillooet	Whistler	167.68	104.19		Lake Placid Road	To Creekside Village
Squamish-Lillooet	Whistler	171.73	106.71		Village Gate Road	To Whistler Village
Squamish-Lillooet	Whistler	172.36	107.10		Lorimer Road	To Upper Village
Squamish-Lillooet	Pemberton	203.56	126.49		Pemberton Meadows Road / Vine Road	Sea to Sky Highway north end; Duffey Lake Road south end
Squamish-Lillooet	Mount Currie	210.50	130.80		Pemberton Portage Road – D'Arcy	
Squamish-Lillooet	Lillooet	301.07	187.08		Seton Lake Road (Highway 907:2935 west) – Lillooet Town Centre, Gold Bridge	Unofficial Highway 40
Squamish-Lillooet	Lillooet	301.58	187.39		Bridge of the Twenty-Three Camels over the Fraser River	
Squamish-Lillooet	Lillooet	302.31	187.85		Highway 12 south – Lytton, Hope	Highway 99 branches north; Duffey Lake Road north end
Thompson-Nicola		377.04	234.28		Highway 97 – Prince George, 100 Mile House, Cache Creek, Kamloops	
1.000 mi = 1.609 km; 1.000 km = 0.621 mi: Concurrency terminus; Incomplete access; Route transition

== See also ==
- List of British Columbia provincial highways
