= Alta Lake =

Alta Lake may refer to:

- Alta Lake (British Columbia), Canada
- Alta Lake, British Columbia, a former recreational community and BCR railway station, now part of Whistler, British Columbia
- Alta Lake, in Alta Lake State Park, Washington, US
