= River of Golden Dreams =

River in British Columbia, Canada

Coordinates: 50°08′44″N 122°57′17″W

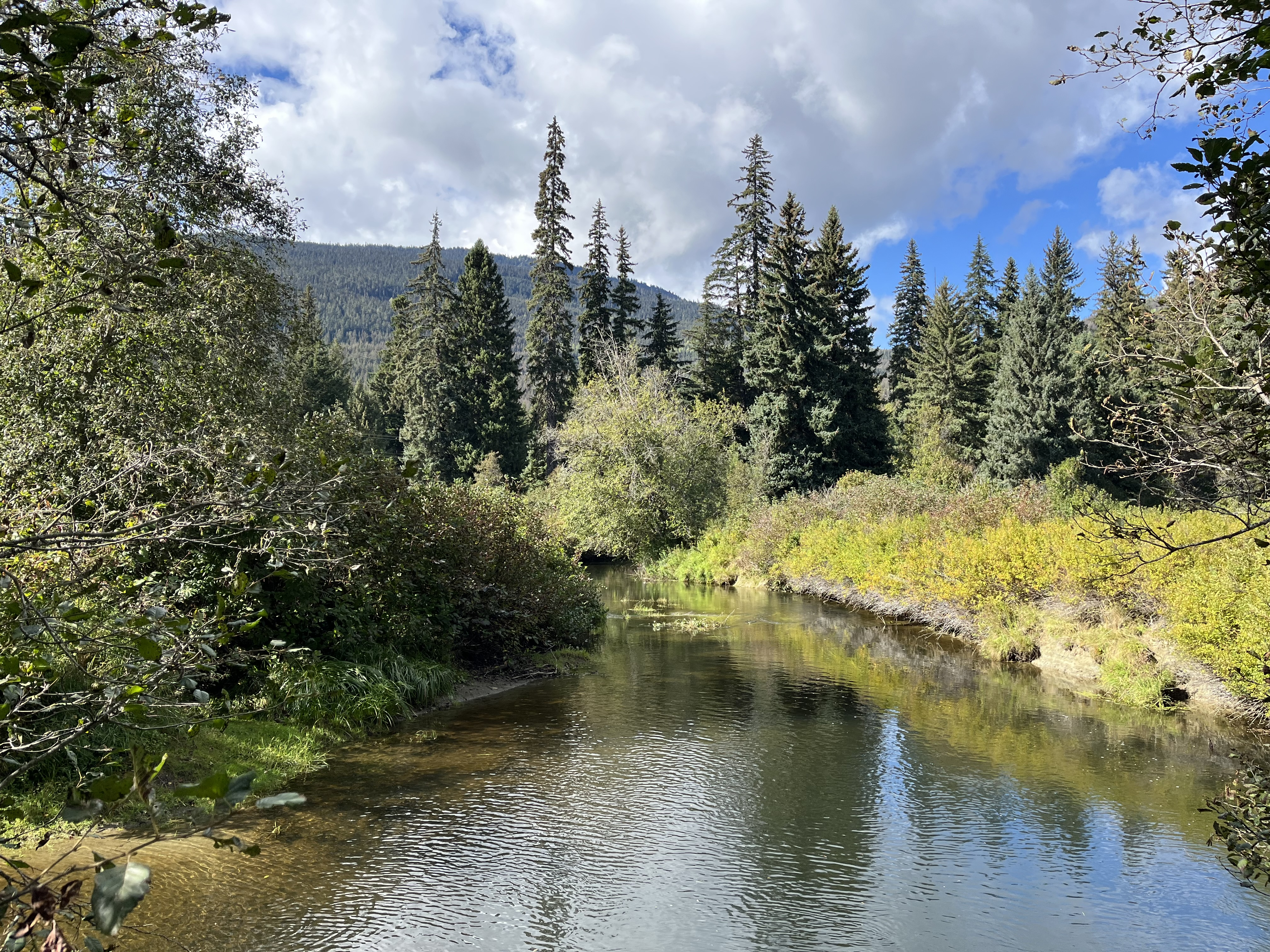
River of Golden Dreams

The River of Golden Dreams, officially Alta Creek, is a short river in Whistler, British Columbia, Canada, connecting Alta Lake (south) to Green Lake (north), which is drained by the Green River.

The river was named in emulation of the popular song Down the River of Golden Dreams which was on the hit parade during the heyday of the Rainbow Lodge, popular with Vancouver-area entertainers as a weekend railway getaway. The river's gentle current, compounded with a golden sunset on the day, is said to have inspired the name, which was popular with boating parties from the Lodge, the original location of which was at the river's egress from Alta Lake and is now a heritage park preserving the lodge's original cabins.

Because of its meandering course, the river's full length is over 5 km, while in absolute terms of the distance covered between Alta and Green Lakes is only 3 km.
