= List of neighbourhoods in Whistler, British Columbia =

This is a list of neighbourhoods in the Resort Municipality of Whistler, British Columbia. Certain non-neighbourhood locations and development complexes are also included.

- Alpha Lake Village
- Alpine Meadows
- Alta Lake (West Side Road)/Rainbow Lodge not to be confused with Rainbow ski hill or Rainbow Estates
- Alta Vista
- Bayshores
- Blackcomb Benchlands
- Brio
- Cheakamus Crossing: Cheakamus (abr.) site of former Whistler Olympic and Paralympic Village (his.), also known as Athletes' Village (his.) for the 2010 Winter Olympics venues, Whistler
- Emerald Estates
- Function Junction Industrial and Commercial zone, southern Whistler, west of Cheakamus Crossing
- Mons
- Nesters
- Nicklaus North
- Nordic Estates Official, Club Cabins (subsection )
- Nordic Estates Official, south end Nicknamed Rimrock
- Rainbow Estates Newest subdivision, between Alpine and Emerald . Site of Ski Rainbow was Whistler’s ‘other’ ski hill: bunny hill + ski jump, 1968–1981.
- Spring Creek
- Tamarisk Estates
- Whistler Cay Estates: Whistler Cay (abv.)
- Whistler Creekside: Alpha Lake(his), Southside, Whistler Creek
- Whistler Highlands
- Whistler Village
- White Gold

== Outside of RMOW Resort Municipality of Whistler ==
- McGuire's/Northair (Callaghan cut-off)
- Black Tusk Estates15 min south of Whistler town limits, in the SLRD, Squamish Lillooet Regional District
- Pinecrest Estates south of Black Tusk Estates and Whistler, in the SLRD, Squamish Lillooet Regional District.
- Pemberton, British Columbia a Whistler Bedroom Community 20 min North, separate municipality.

== See also ==
- Garibaldi(his.) defunct
