= The Whistler Answer =

Periodical

- The Whistler Answer, cover dated April 1, 1977
- Editor & Chief: Charlie Doyle
- Categories: Satire
- Frequency: discontinued, Bimonthly when in print
- Circulation: 1,000 first printing
- First issue: April 1977
- Company: The Whistler Answer
- Country: Canada
- Language: English
- ISSN: 0705-7148

The Whistler Answer was a periodical published in Whistler, British Columbia, Canada, from 1977 until the mid-1990s.

== First edition ==
The first edition of The Whistler Answer was published on April 1, 1977. The production run was 1,000 copies, 12 pages on newsprint in tabloid format. All twelve pages were hand lettered by the editorial staff. This first edition listed

- Charlie Doyle as editor & chief [sic], art, layout, lettering
- Robin Blechman as associate editor, inspiration, lettering
- Tim Smith as associate editor, lettering

The first edition had a cover price of 25 cents but was primarily supported through advertising revenues. The content of The Whistler Answer was mostly satire. The cover of the first edition had a photograph by George Benjamin of three naked canoeists and the headline "Missing On Alta Lake". Alta Lake was frozen over at the time and yet some readers believed the April Fool's headline and story.

The Whistler Answer was unique with its hand lettering or calligraphy, its irregular publication schedule and its "take all contributions" editorial policy with a lack of any clear commercial motive or goal.

== Publication run ==
The Whistler Answer followed a scattered publication schedule. Although initially attempting to publish every two months, readers had the impression that issues were timed around oddball occasions and events like equinoxes, full moons and World Cup Downhill races. 1981 saw the last issue of The Whistler Answer with the original crew.

The Whistler Answer was resurrected in 1992 in a much different Whistler. Real-estate development was rampant and the population had grown to several thousand. Although there was more business and more potential advertising revenue, the publication maintained its irreverent form.

Contributors over the years included Jim Monahan, Bob Eakins, Gary "Chico" Autio, Michael Leierer, Bob Colebrook, "Cosmic" Fred Flores and photographers Chris Speedie and Elwyn Rowlands.

== Digitization of The Answer ==
In 2012 both runs of The Whistler Answer were digitized by the Whistler Museum with funding from the University of British Columbia's Irving K. Barber Learning Centre as part of their British Columbia History Digitization Program. All issues of The Whistler Answer were made available online in 2013. They are currently available on the Whistler Museum's website.
