= British Columbia Highway 12 =

Highway in British Columbia

Highway 12
- Lytton-Lillooet Highway
- Highway 12 highlighted in red

Route information
- Maintained by the Ministry of Transportation and Infrastructure
- Length: 62 km (39 mi)
- Existed: 1953–present

Major junctions
- South end: Highway 1 (TCH) in Lytton
- North end: Highway 99 in Lillooet

Location
- Country: Canada
- Province: British Columbia

Highway system
- British Columbia provincial highways
← Highway 11	→ Highway 13

Highway 12, opened in 1953, is a connection from the Trans-Canada Highway at Lytton to the town of Lillooet, one of two road connections between the Thompson-Nicola and Squamish-Lillooet Regional Districts. The highway originally went all the way to a junction with Highway 97 at Lower Hat Creek, but when the Duffey Lake Road was paved in 1992, the section of Highway 12 from Lillooet to Highway 97 was renumbered 99. Highway 12 follows the east bank of the Fraser River on the western flank of the small Clear Range for 62 km (39 mi) from a junction with Highway 1 at Lytton to a junction with Highway 99 just across the river from the town of Lillooet.

== Major intersections ==
Regional District	Location	km	mi	Destinations	Notes
Thompson-Nicola	Lytton	0.00	0.00	Highway 1 (TCH) – Cache Creek, Hope	Highway 12 southern terminus
Thompson-Nicola	Lytton	1.67	1.04	Chief David Spintlum Lytton Bridge crosses the Fraser River	
Squamish-Lillooet	Lillooet	61.90	38.46	Highway 99 – Whistler, Cache Creek	Highway 12 northern terminus
Thompson-Nicola		136.63	84.90	Highway 97 – Prince George, 100 Mile House, Cache Creek, Kamloops	Former Highway 12 northern terminus (pre-1992)
1.000 mi = 1.609 km; 1.000 km = 0.621 mi: Closed/former
