= M Creek =

Coordinates: 49°28′48″N 123°14′41″W

M Creek, officially M (Yahoo) Creek, is a creek flowing southwest out of the Britannia Range and entering Howe Sound just north of Lions Bay, British Columbia, Canada.

== Description ==
The creek's steep catchment area of 3.3 km^{2}, with headwaters at the 1720 m elevation, 300 m southeast of the summit of Brunswick Mountain. Diorite cliffs flank the course of the creek, between the 900m and 1200 m elevation, with the rocks of the basin part of the Gambier Group. Much of the creek's course is a bedrock canyon, with talus and rockslide debris notable in its upper course, especially on the south side. Prior to the washout of 1981, there had been no debris fan on the waterfront, afterwards the resulting debris fan was 14,100 sq m. The creek's basin was logged in the period 1957 to 1968, via a logging road via Magnesia Creek, with 38% of the creek's basin having been logged.

== M Creek disaster ==
In the early hours of 28 October 1981, following heavy rains, a debris torrent swept away the small timber bridge on British Columbia Highway 99. Nine people lost their lives in the darkness and confusion, going off the highway into the creek's deep canyon, some despite being warned by one driver who had seen the first two cars go in ahead of him. as cars approaching the washout in the rain and dark did not know the bridge was out. The incident led to the highway's sobriquet, conferred by the Vancouver Province, the "Highway of Death" (aka "Killer Highway"). Of the nine victims, one whose body had been recovered from Howe Sound had not gone off the M Creek bridge, but that of Strachan Creek, which was among the many others destroyed by debris torrents that night.

The debris torrent was estimated at 20,000 cubic metres, composed of logs and rock, which emerged from the creek's canyon just above the highway bridge, knocking out the creek's central trestle-span.

The term M Creek disaster became used to refer to all the washouts and flooding from that same evening. Thousands of tourists were stranded at Whistler until the highway was reopened. and led to community discussions and agitation to open a "back door" for Whistler, as many tourists had been stranded by the washouts, with deliberations over the various alternate routes east and south from there ending with the selection of the Duffey Lake Road as the formal extension of Highway 99, which had hitherto ended at Pemberton.

=== Aftermath ===
The same period of rains incurred multiple washouts on the highway between Lions Bay and Pemberton, including several within the Resort Municipality of Whistler, plus the erosion of sand footings for the Culliton Creek bridge in the Cheakamus Canyon/Brohm Ridge stretch of the highway between Brackendale and the abandoned Garibaldi townsite at Rubble Creek. The disaster led to the commissioning of a study on the extent of torrent hazards on the highway, published in 1983 by Thurber Consultants, examining 23 creeks between Horseshoe Bay and Britannia Beach, and on their debris fans on the shoreline, some of which were developed and at risk.

A coroner's jury recommended a series of measures to deal with highway safety, including warning lights at bridges where washouts may occur (this was never acted on), and 11 bridges along the route were replaced with structures with no support spans that might wash out in further debris torrents. Three concrete "debris torrent basins" were constructed on the upper reaches of Charles, Harvey and Magnesia Creeks to avert similar disasters emerging from those basins.

The location today was extensively rebuilt since the disaster, with the creek now bridged by freeway and a concrete structure, as with other hazards along the highway over the years since.

== See also ==
- List of rivers of British Columbia
