= Green Lake (Whistler) =

Lake in British Columbia, Canada

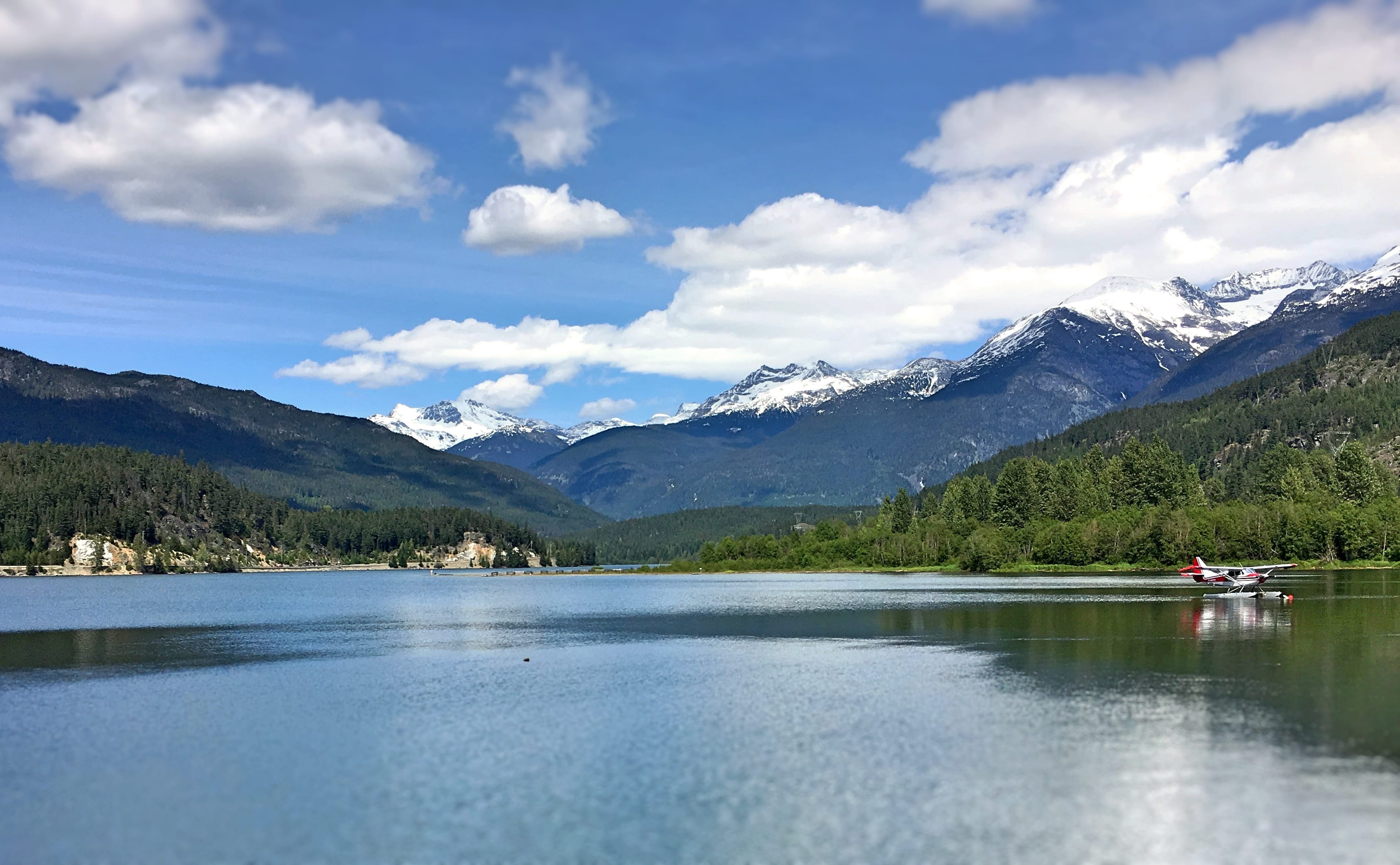

- Location within British Columbia
- Location: Whistler, British Columbia
- Coordinates: 50°09′00″N 122°56′00″W
- Primary inflows: River of Golden Dreams, Fitzsimmons Creek, Rainbow Creek
- Primary outflows: Green River
- Catchment area: Lillooet River
- Basin countries: Canada
- Max. length: 1.2 km (0.75 mi)
- Surface area: 2 km^{2} (0.77 sq mi)
- Surface elevation: 633 m (2,077 ft)

Green Lake is the largest and most northerly lake in the Resort Municipality of Whistler, British Columbia, Canada. It is the source of the Green River, a tributary of the Lillooet River, and is fed by the River of Golden Dreams, which issues from Alta Lake, which is at the height of land dividing the Green River drainage from that of the Cheakamus River to the south, which is a tributary of the Squamish River. Also feeding Green Lake are Fitzsimmons Creek, which originates in the valley above Whistler Village between Blackcomb and Whistler Mountains, and Rainbow Creek, which descends from Rainbow Mountain via the Alpine Meadows subdivision. A former minor ski hill, Rainbow, is located midway between Alpine Meadows and Emerald Estates near the lake's western extremity.

The Whistler neighbourhoods of Alpine Meadows and Emerald Estates are located on the lake's southwestern and northwestern shores, respectively. The ghost town of Parkhurst (aka Green River, though that is a rail stop at the outlet of Green Lake about 1 km north), is known locally but incorrectly as Soo Valley. (The Soo Valley, while nearby, is in a different drainage). Parkhurst grew up around a lumber mill on a point on the east shore of the lake at its narrowest point, opposite Emerald Estates; the porch of the old main building was the location of a locally famous group nude photo by squatter residents of the area in the 1970s, many of whom now figure in the Whistler establishment.

Green Lake is 633 m in elevation, approximately 1.2 km in length, and averages about 650 m in width—with an area in the range of 2.2 km^{2}.

Green Lake also serves as Whistler Airport (airport code YWS), a waterdrome.

== See also ==
- List of lakes of British Columbia
