= Fitzsimmons Creek =

Creek in Whistler, British Columbia, Canada

Coordinates: 50°09′00″N 122°57′00″W

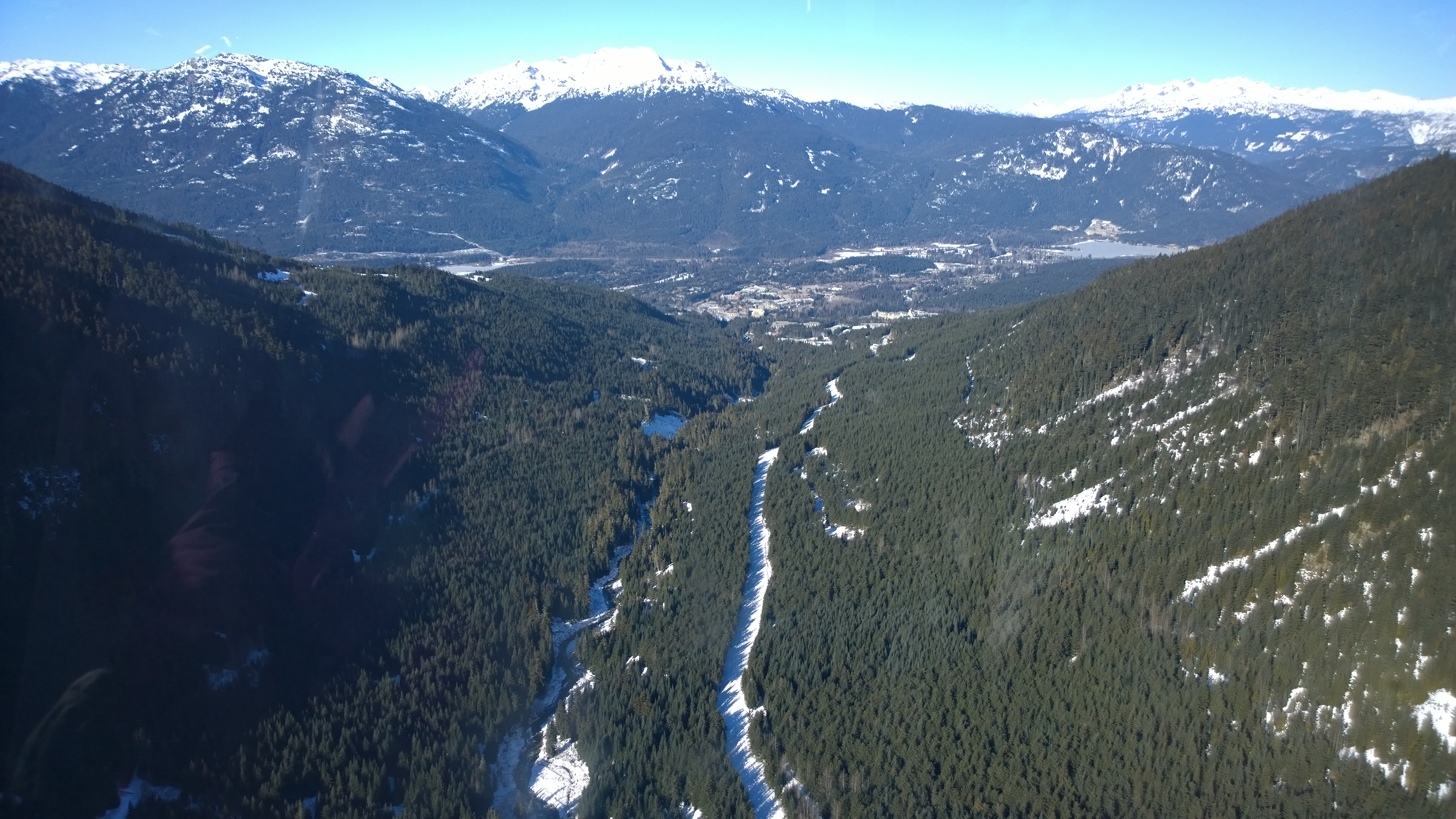
Fitzsimmons Creek and Whistler village from Peak 2 Peak gondola

Fitzsimmons Creek is a large creek in Whistler, British Columbia, Canada, having its origins at the Fitzsimmons Glacier in the Garibaldi Ranges of the Coast Mountains. For half its length of approximately 10 kilometres, the creek courses a U-shaped glacial valley which separates two ski mountains of the Whistler Blackcomb resort, Blackcomb to the north and Whistler to the south.

== Whistler Village ==
Issuing onto the relative lowland of the Whistler Valley just adjacent to Whistler Village, the creek turns more northwest, flowing past the White Gold residential area and entering Green Lake just east of Mons. Fitzsimmons Creek has a history of debris-laden flash floods in times of heavy weather, and is dyked with heavy rip-rap in its source through the area of the village.

Adjacent to the creek on the lowermost slopes of Blackcomb is the Whistler Sliding Centre, built for the 2010 Winter Olympics, which was co-hosted by Whistler and Vancouver. The creek's valley is spanned by the Peak 2 Peak Gondola, the world's highest and longest inter-montagne gondola span.

== Name ==
The creek, and Fitzsimmons Glacier and Mount Fitzsimmons, are named for Jimmy Fitzsimmons, who operated a small mine near the head of the creek.

== Fitzsimmons Creek Hydro ==
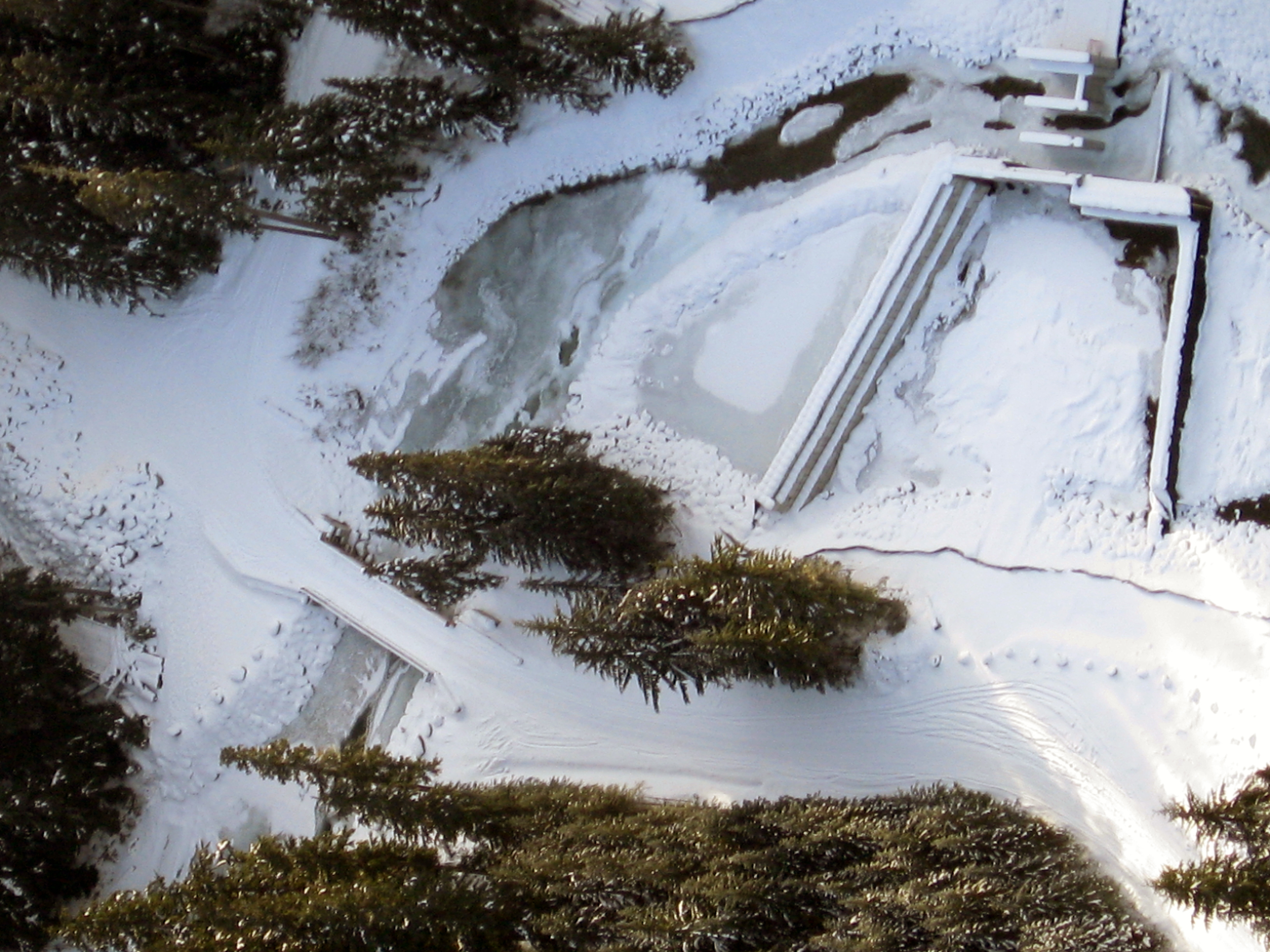
Fitzsimmons Creek and the hydroelectric plant viewed from the Peak 2 Peak Gondola

A run-of-river hydroelectric plant, completed in 2010, the project temporarily diverts creek water through a penstock 4.5 km downstream, an elevation drop of nearly 250 meters, to a powerhouse generating 7.5 MW of electricity. The powerhouse is located between the creek and the lowest point of the bobsleigh track built for the 2010 Winter Olympics. It is majority owned by Innergex Renewable Energy who has a contract as an Independent power producer to sell its power to BC Hydro.

Location & construction

Whistler Museum - Hydro layout

== See also ==
- List of rivers of British Columbia
