= Richmond Nature Park =

Nature park in Richmond, British Columbia, Canada

- Richmond Nature House

- Location within Greater Vancouver Regional District
- Location: Richmond, British Columbia
- Coordinates: 49°10′27″N 123°05′51″W
- Area: 200 acres (81 ha)
- Established: 1968
- Website: www.richmond.ca/parks/parks/naturepark/about.htm

The Richmond Nature Park is a bog-forest nature park located in the city of Richmond, British Columbia. The Richmond Nature Park covers 200 acres of the raised peat bog habitat that has previously covered large sections of Lulu Island. The ever-changing environment of the Richmond Nature Park is also dominated by a wet, spongy land of mosses (specifically sphagnum moss), heath shrubs, and shrub-like trees. The park offers four walking trails that allows visitors to walk amongst the peat bog, the forest, and the pond habitat, and the opportunity to explore the wildlife of the plants and animals within the bog-forest. The Richmond Nature Park Society works on behalf of the Richmond Nature Park as a non-for-profit organization that aims in providing natural history education opportunities for visitors and residents, and through programs and events that promote the natural history of the nature park.

== History ==
1960s: In 1962, the Corporation of the Township of Richmond decided to purchase 217 acres of land from the federal Department of Transport. However, the land did not come fully into use until 1968 when Will Paulik, Secretary of the Richmond Rod and Gun Club, claimed that the acres should be used as a nature region and from then on the park began to shape outdoor activities, there by establishing the land as a park.

1970s: During the 1970s, the beautiful nature park had a lot of success and significant moments. For instance, their first committee meeting took place in 1971. In 1972 the park was officially named and they were endowed Local Ascendancy Grants in order to help and support a number of their future projects that they had forthcoming. 1976 was a significant year because the Nature House was opened to the public, and in the following year, the name of the committee was officially changed to the Richmond Nature Park Society.

1980s: In the 1980s, the park's main goal was to build future ideas and to develop the park even more. There were a lot of projects that took place successfully, such as constructing a boardwalk primarily for disabled people, providing them with their own personal trail that gave them access around the pond. The park's nature exhibits were also updated. Some other projects were the Bog Ecology Protection Zone, the trail guides, and time trails. Through the years of 1987-1989, the park took part in technological advancement, such as their first computer and video camera for the surveillance of the park and to support their office work research for the nature house.

1990s: In 1995, a winter outreach program that was directed for schools was developed, known as "Wilderness on Wheels"; however, the name of the program was later changed to "Natural Indoors". In the year of 1997, the park proudly celebrated its 25th anniversary.

2000s: In the year 2002, the 30th Anniversary of the City of Richmond took place. It was during this year that the park was officially appointed and identified as the Richmond Nature Park, and up to this day the park continues to flourish.

== Richmond Nature House ==
Richmond Nature Park Entrance Sign

The Richmond Nature House in Richmond Nature Park is an interpretive centre for visitors to learn more about the park through interactive displays, games, and resources. The Nature House also offers a gift shop, trail guide information, and exhibits including an active beehive and a reptile show, and a collection of live animals to educate visitors about the bog. Admission into the Nature House is by donation.

== Activities ==
Pond Trail Entrance

Based on the many resources that is offered by the park, this allows visitors to engage in a variety of recreational and educational activities for all ages. Visitors of the park can participate in hiking and walking along the four available park trails, which are also handicap and stroller accessible. Birdwatching, photography, and sightseeing is also available to explore in the park's natural scenery, giving visitors the ability to encounter plants and animals in the bog, forest, and pond habitats. Other amenities located in the park include the outdoor picnic area including picnic tables, washrooms, a playground area, and available parking. However, food services within the park are not available.

The four main trails in the Richmond Nature Park include: Bog Forest Trail (1.8 km), Quaking Trail (1.6 km), Time trail (0.83 km) and Pond Trail (0.35 km).

== Ecology ==
=== Lulu Island Bog ===
The Lulu Island Bog which once covered a large portion of Lulu Island, is now a large remaining fragment that makes up Richmond Nature Park in the Fraser River Delta. This ecosystem has been disrupted significantly by changes in drainage and reduction in size, but it has kept in good shape as a raised peat bog ecosystem. The development of Lulu Island Bog has led to significant changes in the bogs ecosystem over the course of the years, especially as a result of urban and agricultural use of the land. Dominated by large precipitation levels, the study of this ecosystem structure is focused on the "raised or domed centre" of the bog which "causes water to drain from the centre radically outwards".

The Lulu Island Bog is characterized by their temperate climate, acidic (low pH) growing conditions, and with a minimal water flow into the bog. The ecology of the bog is made up of the moss known as sphagnum, which develops under an acidic, “cool, wet climatic conditions”, and this moss type plays an important role in the development of a bog. The development of sphagnum moss takes place in areas where the rainwater accumulates. However, the plants in the bog receive very little - and sometimes even no - waterborne nutrients. Due to the lack of waterborne nutrients, various resilient plants live amongst the sphagnum moss that are able to tolerate full on cool, acidic peat bog soils.

One of the plant features of this bog are the carnivorous plants. These plants counteract the lack of nutrients in the soil by entrapping and consuming small insects, such as the round-leafed sundew, pitcher plants, and bladderworts. This bog is predominantly taken over by the "flowering plants" heath shrubs, including Labrador tea, bog rosemary, western bog laurel, bog blueberry and bog cranberry. As a result of the drainage impact and the drying of the bog, the Lulu Island Bog is also dominated by a few invasive species, including the European birch, highbush blueberry, American cranberry, and Scotch heather. The Shore Pine tree is a tree characteristic of the bog-forest park, having the ability to tolerate the poor soils and distinguished by its "stunted or spindly appearance".

=== Wildlife in the area ===
Over 100 species reside in the Richmond Nature Park. Amongst the species that live in the nature park, there are at least 13 mammals including shrews, the douglas squirrel, mice, coyotes, and black tailed deer. Migratory birds have also been seen to be living in the park, including a variety of owl species, hawks, eagles, woodpeckers, and many more. Many of the bird species are considered to be "year-round residents", while other bird species are "found seasonally or during migration only". Over the past few decades since the park has been established, the numbers and diversity of the birds have changed with time as the bog-forest has developed and expanded, but there has been especially fewer waterfowl compared to what was there during the 1970s

Other species in the nature park include 2 types of garter snakes and several frog species. invertebrate species are also frequently present in the park, with a great diversity of colourful butterflies and dragonflies that fly around the pond during the spring and summer seasons.

== Directions ==
The main entrance into Richmond Nature Park is through Westminster Highway, just next to No. 5 road in east Richmond. The city of Richmond is located south from the city of Vancouver and nearby Vancouver International Airport. The nature park is approximately a 30-minute drive from Downtown Vancouver and it is accessible via Highway 99 moving into Richmond.

Exact address and directions into Richmond Nature Park: 11851 Westminster Hwy, Richmond, BC.

== See also ==
- Pacific Spirit Regional Park - Camosun Bog
- Burns Bog
