= Alta Lake (British Columbia) =

Lake in British Columbia, Canada

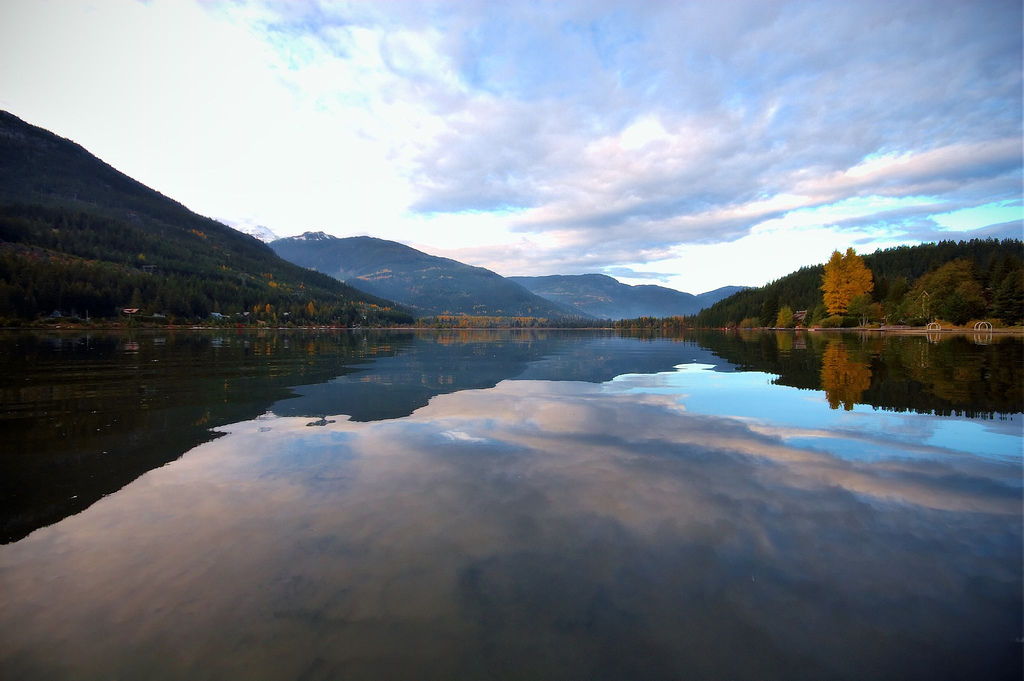
- Alta Lake in October 2007, looking north from approx mid-lake. Whistler Cay neighbourhood at right.

- Location within British Columbia
- Location: Whistler, British Columbia
- Coordinates: 50°06′53″N 122°58′55″W
- Basin countries: Canada
- Max. length: 2.2 km (1.4 mi)
- Max. width: 675 m (2,215 ft)
- Surface area: 1.1 km^{2} (0.42 sq mi)
- Surface elevation: 642 m (2,106 ft)

Alta Lake is a lake in the Resort Municipality of Whistler, British Columbia, Canada.

Originally named Summit Lake, Alta Lake was renamed to avoid confusion with the many other Summit Lakes in British Columbia. The name is derived from the Spanish for "high up" or "upper". The lake's southern end is the divide between the basins of the Green and Cheakamus Rivers. The lake is 642 metres (2,106 ft) in elevation and approximately 1.1 km^{2} (0.42 sq mi) in area and 2.2 kilometres (1.4 mi) north to south, with a maximum width of about 675 metres (2,215 ft), east to west.

Neighbourhoods around the lake include Alta Lake, the original community in this area (now referred to as "Westside"), Alta Vista and Whistler Cay Estates. At the north end of the lake the original site of Rainbow Lodge preserves some cabins that were part of that rustic resort, and a municipally run ecological preserve which extends up the wetlands of the River of Golden Dreams (a.k.a. Alta Creek), which leads to Green Lake. A wayside park, formerly a provincial park and now municipally run is located near the south end of the lake.

== See also ==
- List of lakes of British Columbia
