= Alta Lake, British Columbia =

Alta Lake
- Location of Alta Lake in British Columbia
- Coordinates: 50°06′00″N 122°29′00″W
- Country: Canada
- Province: British Columbia
- Time zone: UTC−07:00 (PT)
- Area codes: 250, 778

Alta Lake was a recreational community and railway station on the west side of Alta Lake. It is now a neighbourhood of Whistler, British Columbia, Canada. The post office was renamed Whistler in 1976 when the area was incorporated as part of the Resort Municipality of Whistler.

Canada was shocked when the Canadian Broadcasting Corporation led its morning radio broadcast about Pierre Elliott Trudeau, the bachelor Prime Minister of Canada since 1968, honeymooning at Alta Lake at the condominium owned by his new in-laws, former federal Cabinet minister Jimmy Sinclair and his wife Kathleen, the day after a surprise wedding in North Vancouver, British Columbia on March 4, 1971, to Margaret Sinclair.

== See also ==
- Rainbow Lodge
