= Green River (British Columbia) =

Tributary of the Lillooet River in British Columbia, Canada

Coordinates: 50°18′07″N 122°43′19″W

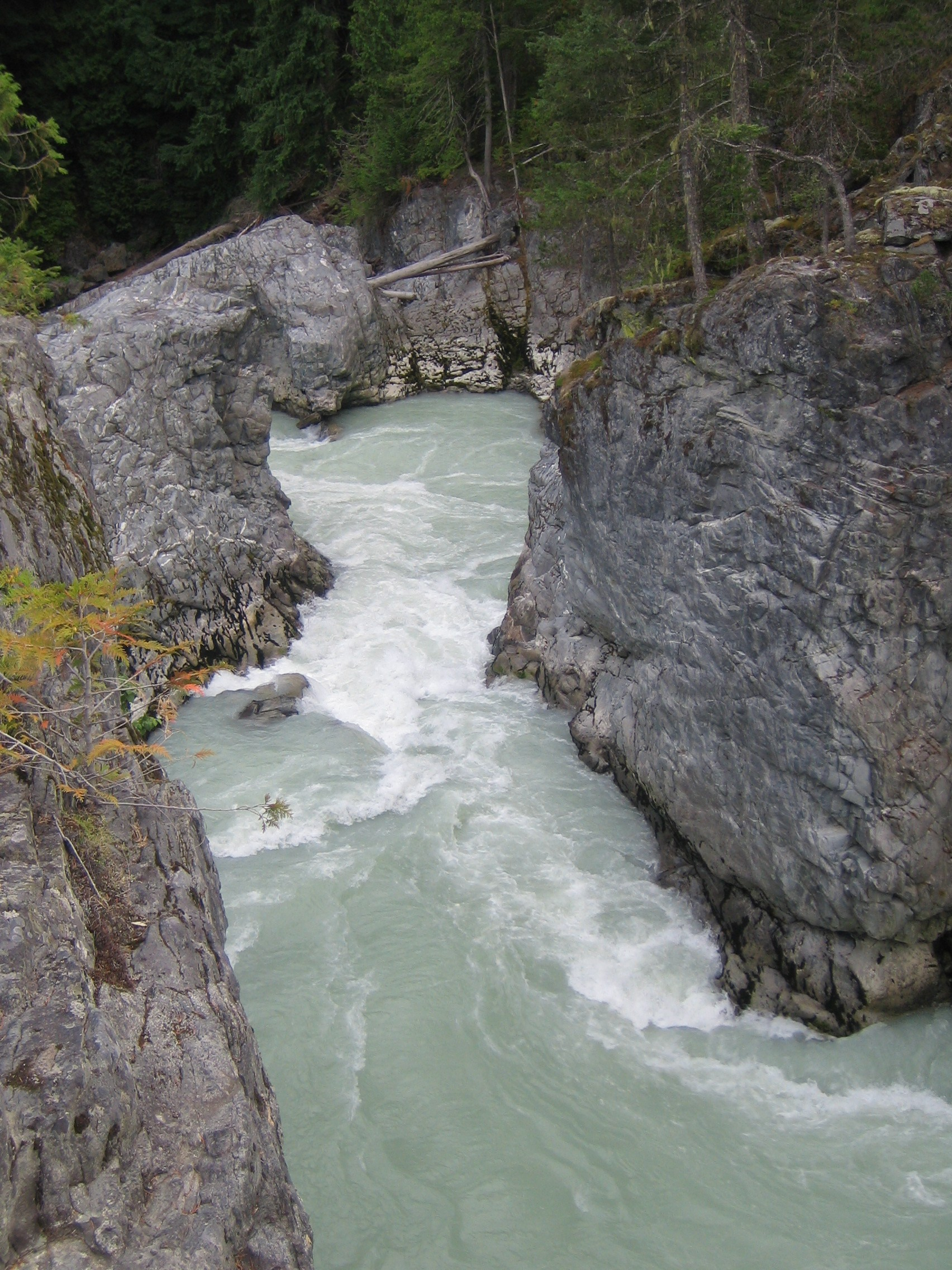
Green River just below Nairn Falls

The Green River is a tributary of the Lillooet River in southwestern British Columbia, Canada. Approximately 25 kilometres in length, it begins at the outflow of Green Lake at the north of Whistler, and flows northeast to join the Lillooet River about two kilometres above where the river flows into Lillooet Lake. Its main tributaries are the Soo River and the river-like Rutherford Creek, which is the location of one of only two artificial whitewater kayaking courses in Canada. Just below Rutherford Creek is Nairn Falls.

== See also ==
- List of rivers of British Columbia
- River of Golden Dreams
