= Rainbow Lodge =

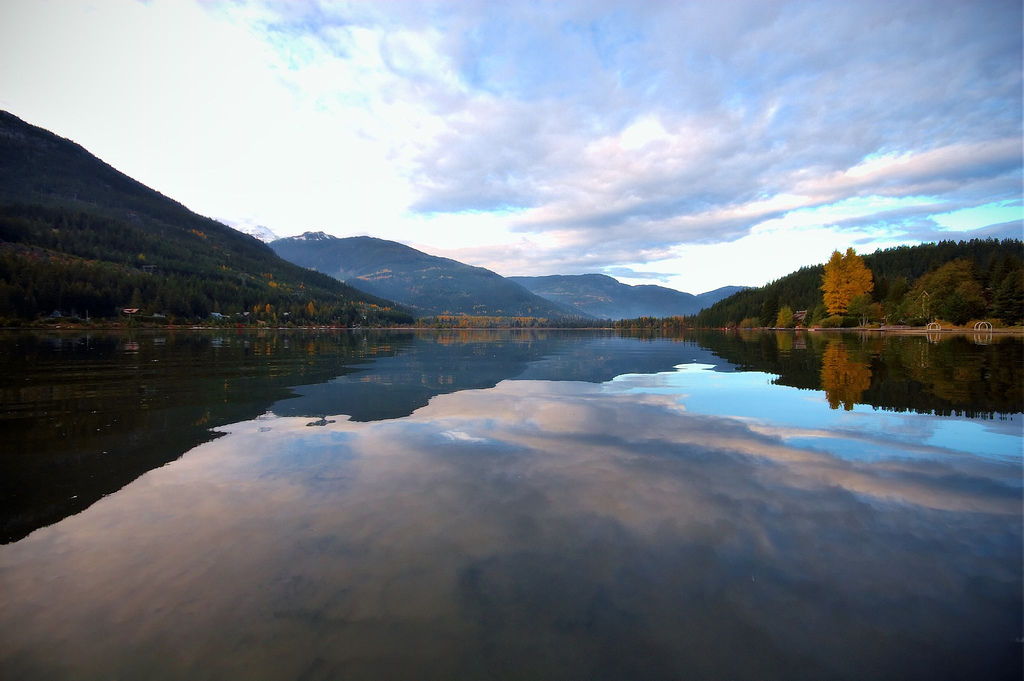
Rainbow Lodge sat centre left at far end of lake by grove of orange poplars on Alta Lake; Whistler sits out of view at right.

Rainbow Lodge was a small railway resort and was the first commercial fishing and weekend retreat cabin on Alta Lake, which is now part of the Resort Municipality of Whistler, British Columbia, and stood from 1914 to 1977. The lodge was a log cabin with peaked roof on the northwest verge of the lake by the railway line. Rainbow Lodge was among the first built along the Pacific Great Eastern line, which as of 1915 opened from Squamish to Clinton, British Columbia and was one of several along the line as far as Lillooet where Craig Lodge was.

Rainbow Lodge also served as the area's post office. Horse loggers were busy in the valley prior to the Second World War.

By the 1940s, Rainbow Lodge had been enlarged to serve over 100 guests, and was the most popular camping lodge west of the Rocky Mountains. In 1948, the Philips sold the property to Alec and Audrey Greenwood.

Myrtle Philip lived in Whistler until her death in 1986. Rainbow Lodge burned down in 1977.
