= Whistler, British Columbia =

Resort municipality in British Columbia, Canada

Whistler Cwítima, Sḵwiḵw
- Resort municipality
- Resort Municipality of Whistler
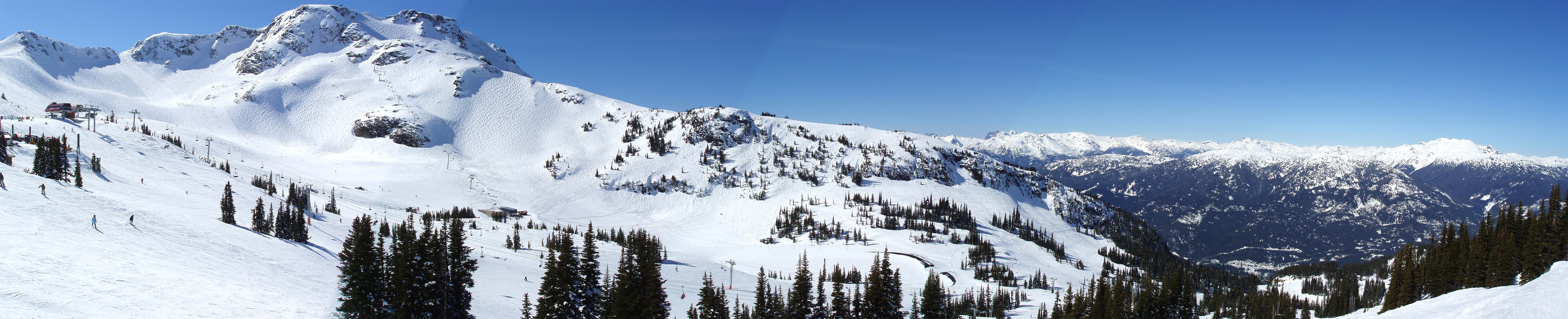
- Whistler panorama

- Flag

- Location of Whistler Whistler (Canada)
- Coordinates: 50°07′00″N 122°57′15″W
- Country: Canada
- Province: British Columbia
- Region: British Columbia Coast
- Subregion: Sea-to-Sky Corridor
- Regional district: Squamish-Lillooet
- Settled: 1914 by Myrtle and Alex Philip
- Incorporated as a resort municipality: 1975

Government
  - Type: Elected town council
  - Mayor: Jack Crompton
  - Manager: Virginia Cullen
  - Governing body: Whistler Town Council
  - MP: Patrick Weiler
  - MLA: Jeremy Valeriote

Area (2021)
  - Total: 240.00 km^{2} (92.66 sq mi)
- Elevation: 670 m (2,200 ft)

Population (2021)
  - Total: 13,982
  - Density: 58.3/km^{2} (151/sq mi)
- Time zone: UTC−07:00 (Pacific Time)
- Postal code span: V0N 1B0 & V8E
- Area code: 604
- GNBC Code: JCJHI
- Website: Resort Municipality of Whistler

The resort takes its name from the whistling sound made by the hoary marmot

Whistler is a resort municipality in Squamish-Lillooet Regional District, British Columbia, Canada. It is located in the southern Pacific Ranges of the Coast Mountains, approximately 125 km (78 mi) north of Vancouver and 36 km (22 mi) south of Pemberton. It has a permanent population of approximately 13,982 (2021), and 3,241 seasonal residents (estimated).

Over two million people visit Whistler annually, primarily for alpine skiing and snowboarding and, in the summer, mountain biking at Whistler Blackcomb. Its pedestrian village has won numerous design awards, and Whistler has been voted among the top destinations in North America by major ski magazines since the mid-1990s. During the 2010 Vancouver Winter Olympics, Whistler hosted most of the alpine events, Nordic, luge, skeleton, and bobsled events.

== History ==
The Whistler Valley is located around the pass between the headwaters of the Green River and the upper-middle reaches of the Cheakamus. It is flanked by glaciated mountains on both sides; the Garibaldi Ranges on the side that contains the ski mountains, and a group of ranges with no collective name but that are part of the larger Pacific Ranges and are essentially fore-ranges of the Pemberton Icefield. Although there are a few other routes through the maze of mountains between the basin of the Lillooet River just east, the Cheakamus-Green divide is the lowest and most direct.

=== Indigenous settlement ===
Before European settlement, the Lilʼwat First Nation and Squamish Nation both used the Whistler area, which they called Cwítima and Sḵwiḵw, respectively. They also shared a village known as Spó7ez at the confluence of Rubble Creek and the Cheakamus River south of Whistler. Spó7ez, a hub of trade and commerce, was buried after the Black Tusk volcano erupted. Both Nations continued to cohabit the region, travelling to the area in the warmer months, where they established seasonal camps for hunting and trapping. Spó7ez was re-populated until it was destroyed by another rock slide in the 1800s. Evidence was found of an ístken pit-house on the land that became the Squamish Lil'wat Cultural Centre, which was used by the Wolf Clan (now known as the Wallace Family) as shelter.

=== European settlement ===
The first British survey by the Royal Navy took place in the 1860s. These surveyors named the mountain London Mountain because of the heavy fog and cloud typically gathering around the mountain, but the area informally acquired the name "Whistler" due to the call of the hoary marmot. In the late 19th century, the Lillooet Cattle Trail was cut through the valley, linking Lillooet via Pemberton with Burrard Inlet via a pass from Squamish to the Seymour River. The trail was completed in 1877, but because of the difficult and unforgiving terrain, it was only used once for its intended purpose, which was to drive cattle.

The area began to attract trappers and prospectors—such as John Millar and Henry Horstman—who established small camps in the area in the early 20th century. The area began to gain recognition with the arrival of Myrtle (whom the Myrtle Philip school was named after) and Alex Philip, who in 1914 purchased 4.0 ha (10 acres) of land on Alta Lake and established the Rainbow Lodge. The Philips had relocated from Maine to Vancouver in 1910 and had heard rumours of the natural beauty of the area from Pemberton pioneer John Millar. After an exploratory journey, the couple was convinced.

Rainbow Lodge and other railway-dependent tourist resorts were collectively known as Alta Lake. Along with the rest of the valley bridging the Cheakamus (pron. CHEEK-a-mus) and Green River (a tributary of the Lillooet River) basins, they became part of British Columbia's first resort municipalityin 1975.

Completion of the Pacific Great Eastern Railway in 1914 greatly reduced the travel time from three days, providing ease of access from Vancouver, and the Rainbow Lodge gained a reputation as the most popular vacation destination west of the Rockies. The lodge was primarily a summer destination, with boating, fishing and hiking among the most popular activities, and soon other lodges began to open not just on Alta Lake, but on other valley lakes as well.

Appreciation of the outdoors was not the only activity in the valley, however. Logging was a booming industry. During the first half of the 20th century, most of the lower slopes of the surrounding mountains were cleared of old-growth. At its peak, four mills were in operation, most located around Green Lake. Prospecting and trapping were pursued as well, though no claims of great value were ever staked.

The resort town was granted heraldic symbols by the Canadian Heraldic Authority in January 2016.

== Geography ==
=== Climate ===
Whistler has a humid continental climate (Köppen climate classification: Dsb/Dfb) or a Mediterranean climate bordering on an oceanic climate (Köppen: Csb/Cfb) depending on the isotherm used. It has cold wet winters with significant snowfall and cloud cover, and warm summers which are somewhat dry. On average, Whistler receives approximately 11 days with temperatures over 30 °C (86 °F) and approximately 24 days with temperatures falling below −10 °C (14 °F).

Climate data for Whistler Climate ID: 1048898; coordinates 50°07′44″N 122°57′17″W; elevation: 657.8 m (2,158 ft); 1981–2010 normals
Month	Jan	Feb	Mar	Apr	May	Jun	Jul	Aug	Sep	Oct	Nov	Dec	Year
Record high humidex	7.8	12.8	18.8	38.7	34.8	44.0	42.2	38.8	34.6	27.3	13.7	10.3	44.0
Record high °C (°F)	8.9 (48.0)	14.3 (57.7)	19.6 (67.3)	27.8 (82.0)	35.6 (96.1)	42.9 (109.2)	38.8 (101.8)	38.0 (100.4)	35.0 (95.0)	26.8 (80.2)	13.6 (56.5)	10.4 (50.7)	42.9 (109.2)
Mean daily maximum °C (°F)	0.6 (33.1)	3.2 (37.8)	7.2 (45.0)	11.8 (53.2)	16.4 (61.5)	19.9 (67.8)	23.6 (74.5)	24.0 (75.2)	19.8 (67.6)	11.2 (52.2)	3.5 (38.3)	−0.2 (31.6)	11.7 (53.1)
Daily mean °C (°F)	−2.1 (28.2)	−0.5 (31.1)	2.4 (36.3)	6.1 (43.0)	10.1 (50.2)	13.6 (56.5)	16.4 (61.5)	16.5 (61.7)	12.7 (54.9)	6.7 (44.1)	0.9 (33.6)	−2.8 (27.0)	6.7 (44.1)
Mean daily minimum °C (°F)	−4.9 (23.2)	−4.2 (24.4)	−2.3 (27.9)	0.3 (32.5)	3.8 (38.8)	7.2 (45.0)	9.2 (48.6)	8.9 (48.0)	5.6 (42.1)	2.0 (35.6)	−1.8 (28.8)	−5.4 (22.3)	1.5 (34.7)
Record low °C (°F)	−28.2 (−18.8)	−24.1 (−11.4)	−18.5 (−1.3)	−7.7 (18.1)	−3.4 (25.9)	−0.7 (30.7)	0.3 (32.5)	0.0 (32.0)	−3.2 (26.2)	−14.2 (6.4)	−24.3 (−11.7)	−29.2 (−20.6)	−29.2 (−20.6)
Record low wind chill	−29.4	−37.4	−21.7	−10	0.0	0.0	0.0	0.0	0.0	−22.2	−31.9	−30.1	−37.4
Average precipitation mm (inches)	176.0 (6.93)	104.6 (4.12)	97.6 (3.84)	75.9 (2.99)	66.7 (2.63)	58.9 (2.32)	44.7 (1.76)	47.5 (1.87)	54.9 (2.16)	154.6 (6.09)	192.1 (7.56)	154.1 (6.07)	1,227.7 (48.33)
Average rainfall mm (inches)	84.7 (3.33)	50.2 (1.98)	55.4 (2.18)	61.2 (2.41)	65.7 (2.59)	58.9 (2.32)	44.7 (1.76)	47.5 (1.87)	54.9 (2.16)	146.7 (5.78)	131.1 (5.16)	54.8 (2.16)	855.9 (33.70)
Average snowfall cm (inches)	103.0 (40.6)	64.2 (25.3)	47.4 (18.7)	15.8 (6.2)	1.0 (0.4)	0.0 (0.0)	0.0 (0.0)	0.0 (0.0)	0.0 (0.0)	7.6 (3.0)	65.7 (25.9)	114.0 (44.9)	418.7 (164.8)
Average precipitation days (≥ 0.2 mm)	18.9	14.9	16.9	16.2	15.0	13.8	10.0	9.2	10.0	17.3	19.6	18.0	179.7
Average rainy days (≥ 0.2 mm)	10.6	8.7	11.6	14.3	15.0	13.8	10.0	9.2	10.0	16.7	14.5	7.9	142.2
Average snowy days (≥ 0.2 cm)	13.7	10.1	9.2	4.4	0.5	0.0	0.0	0.0	0.0	1.4	9.7	14.6	63.5
Average relative humidity (%) (at 15:00 LST)	85.8	75.1	66.3	57.8	52.5	52.9	47.9	47.5	52.4	70.3	85.8	87.1	65.1
Mean monthly sunshine hours	40.3	78.4	123.2	162.4	207.3	204.9	250.6	241.4	194.0	109.0	41.8	30.4	1,683.8
Percentage possible sunshine	15.1	27.6	33.5	39.4	43.4	41.9	50.8	53.8	51.1	32.6	15.3	12.0	34.7
Source: Environment and Climate Change Canada

=== Flora ===
Whistler is a collection of microclimates ranging from coniferous mixed forest on the valley floor, to slightly drier slopes, to alpine tundra in the alpine.

The wet West Coast marine temperate climate in the valley floor is characterized by a coniferous mixed forest, with a preponderance of western red cedar—a continuation of the rainforest of the Pacific Northwest.

The slopes are slightly drier and are also coniferous mixed forest with western hemlock (Tsuga heterophylla) and mountain hemlock (Tsuga mertensiana), Whistler hybrid spruce (Sitka spruce, Picea sitchensis and Engelmann spruce, Picea engelmannii). The last is "a hybrid spruce that is unique to Whistler, aptly dubbed the "Whistler Spruce". "The Whistler spruce hybrid is indicative of Whistler's geographic position—we're not quite coastal, but not quite interior". It is a hybrid of the wetter West Coast Sitka spruce (Picea sitchensis), which ranges from Northern California to Alaska, and the drier Interior Engelmann spruce (Picea engelmannii). Others include the Douglas fir (Pseudotsuga menziesii), lodgepole pine (Pinus contorta), and endangered whitebark pine (Pinus albicaulis).

The higher slopes transition to many species of scrub juniper (genus Juniperus), Rocky Mountain juniper (Juniperus scopulorum), and many species of scrub willow in the genus Salix at the tree line, and to Arctic tundra-like conditions in the high alpine above the tree line.

Both the valley floor and the mountain sides are characterized as mixed forest, predominantly conifers, but with a peppering of a few deciduous trees like the Pacific dogwood (Cornus nuttallii), locally extinct Pacific crabapple (Malus fusca) or Pryus fusca, bitter cherry (Prunus emarginata), pin cherry (Prunus pensylvanica), choke cherry (Prunus virginiana), red alder (Alnus rubra), Sitka alder (Alnus sinuata), paper birch (Betula papyrifera), big leaf maple (Acer macrophyllum), and Douglas maple (Acer glabrum).

Whistler was clear cut twice. The Oregon grape Mahonia aquifolium or Berberis aquifolium (a.k.a. hollyleaved barberry) and highbush cranberry Viburnum opulus were accidentally re-introduced as escaped landscaping plants, and may all be Oregonian subspecies. All the wild Pacific crabapples were dug up by Pemberton Pioneers for grafting rootstock. It is unclear whether the Chickasaw plum (Prunus americana) was indigenous or introduced by Indigenous transcontinental trade networks or later Western contact. All the wild plums were dug up too by Pemberton Pioneers for fruit trees to transplant and as rootstock. Once abundant on the forest floor, lingonberry (Vaccinium vitis-idaea) is no longer found because of the loss of habitat through the clear-cutting.

== Demographics ==
Historical population
Year	Pop.	±%
1981	1,369	—
1986	2,002	+46.2%
1991	4,459	+122.7%
1996	7,172	+60.8%
2001	8,896	+24.0%
2006	9,248	+4.0%
2011	9,824	+6.2%
2016	11,854	+20.7%
2021	13,982	+18.0%
1981 / 1986, 1991 / 1996, 2001 / 2006, 2011 / 2016, 2021

In the 2021 Canadian census conducted by Statistics Canada, Whistler had a population of 13,982 living in 5,597 of its 10,065 total private dwellings, a change of 19% from its 2016 population of 11,746. With a land area of 240 km^{2} (93 sq mi), it had a population density of 58.3/km^{2} (150.9/sq mi) in 2021.

=== Ethnicity ===
Panethnic groups in the District of Whistler (2001–2021)
Panethnic group	2021		2016		2011		2006		2001	
Panethnic group	Pop.	%	Pop.	%	Pop.	%	Pop.	%	Pop.	%
European (Note: Statistic includes all persons that did not make up part of a visible minority or an indigenous identity.)	11,570	86.18%	9,905	88.08%	7,960	87.14%	8,515	92.1%	8,265	92.92%
Southeast Asian (Note: Statistic includes total responses of "Filipino" and "Southeast Asian" under visible minority section on census.)	660	4.92%	425	3.78%	280	3.07%	140	1.51%	75	0.84%
East Asian (Note: Statistic includes total responses of "Chinese", "Korean", and "Japanese" under visible minority section on census.)	620	4.62%	460	4.09%	505	5.53%	315	3.41%	360	4.05%
Indigenous	145	1.08%	130	1.16%	55	0.6%	120	1.3%	115	1.29%
Latin American	140	1.04%	100	0.89%	45	0.49%	30	0.32%	10	0.11%
South Asian	105	0.78%	140	1.24%	180	1.97%	40	0.43%	20	0.22%
African	90	0.67%	35	0.31%	75	0.82%	20	0.22%	10	0.11%
Middle Eastern (Note: Statistic includes total responses of "West Asian" and "Arab" under visible minority section on census.)	40	0.3%	30	0.27%	0	0%	55	0.59%	15	0.17%
Other/multiracial (Note: Statistic includes total responses of "Visible minority, n.i.e." and "Multiple visible minorities" under visible minority section on census.)	65	0.48%	30	0.27%	25	0.27%	15	0.16%	40	0.45%
Total responses	13,425	96.02%	11,245	95.73%	9,135	92.99%	9,245	99.97%	8,895	99.99%
Total population	13,982	100%	11,746	100%	9,824	100%	9,248	100%	8,896	100%
Note: Totals greater than 100% due to multiple origin responses.

=== Religion ===
According to the 2021 census, religious groups in Whistler included:

- Irreligion (9,755 persons or 72.7%)
- Christianity (3,280 persons or 24.4%)
- Judaism (145 persons or 1.1%)
- Buddhism (75 persons or 0.6%)
- Islam (50 persons or 0.4%)
- Indigenous Spirituality (10 persons or 0.1%)
- Other (95 persons or 0.7%)

== Arts and culture ==
The Whistler Film Festival is produced by the Whistler Film Festival Society (WFFS). It is held over five days from the first weekend of December.

== Attractions ==
Attractions include skiing, snowboarding, mountain biking, hiking, ice skating, snowshoeing, tobogganing, golfing, and fishing.

== Sports ==
=== 1968, 1976, and 2010 Winter Olympics ===
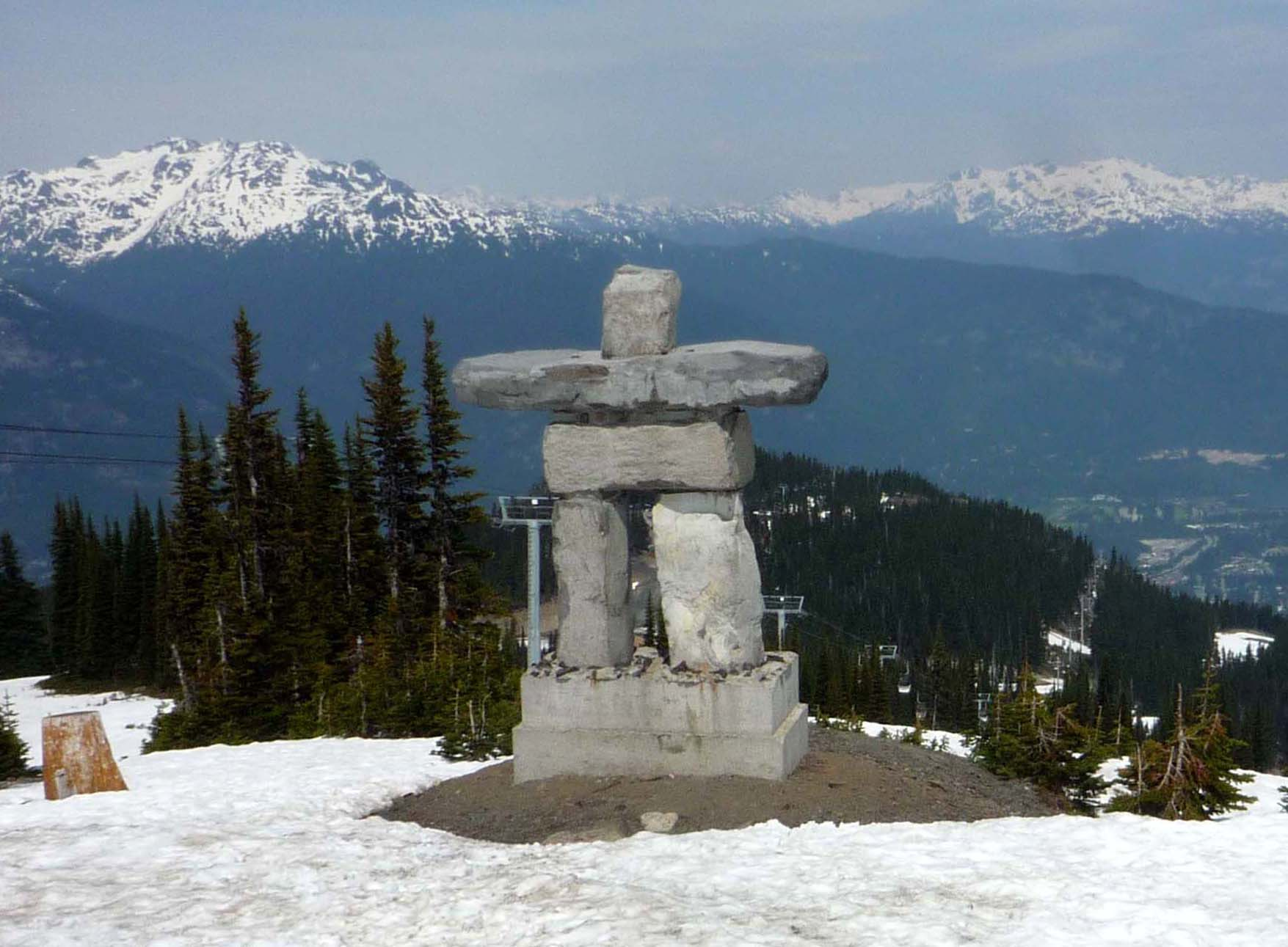
A statue of Ilanaaq, emblem of the 2010 Winter Olympics, located on Whistler Mountain

Until the 1960s, this quiet area was without basic infrastructure. There were no sewage facilities, water, or electricity, and no road from Squamish or Vancouver. In 1962, four Vancouver businessmen began to explore the area with the intent of building a ski resort and bidding for the 1968 Winter Olympics. Garibaldi Lift Company (Whistler Blackcomb) was formed, shares were sold, and in 1966, Whistler Mountain opened to the public.

Later, the town, then still known as Alta Lake, was offered the 1976 Winter Olympics after the selected host city Denver declined the games due to funding issues. Alta Lake Whistler declined as well, after elections ushered in a local government less enthusiastic about the Olympics. The 1976 Winter Olympics were ultimately held in Innsbruck, Austria.

Whistler was the Host Mountain Resort of the Vancouver 2010 Winter Olympics and Paralympic Games, the first time the International Olympic Committee has bestowed that designation on a community. Whistler hosted the alpine technical and speed events, the bobsleigh, luge, and skeleton at Whistler Sliding Centre located adjacent to Fitzsimmons Creek, the Nordic events at the Whistler Olympic Park in the nearby Callaghan Valley and all the Paralympic Games events except the opening ceremonies, sledge hockey and wheelchair curling.

The Whistler Olympic and Paralympic Village (commonly referred to as the Athlete's village) housed around 2,400 athletes, coaches, trainers and officials. Post-games, the site has been turned into a new residential neighbourhood, Cheakamus Crossing.

== Infrastructure ==
=== Transportation ===
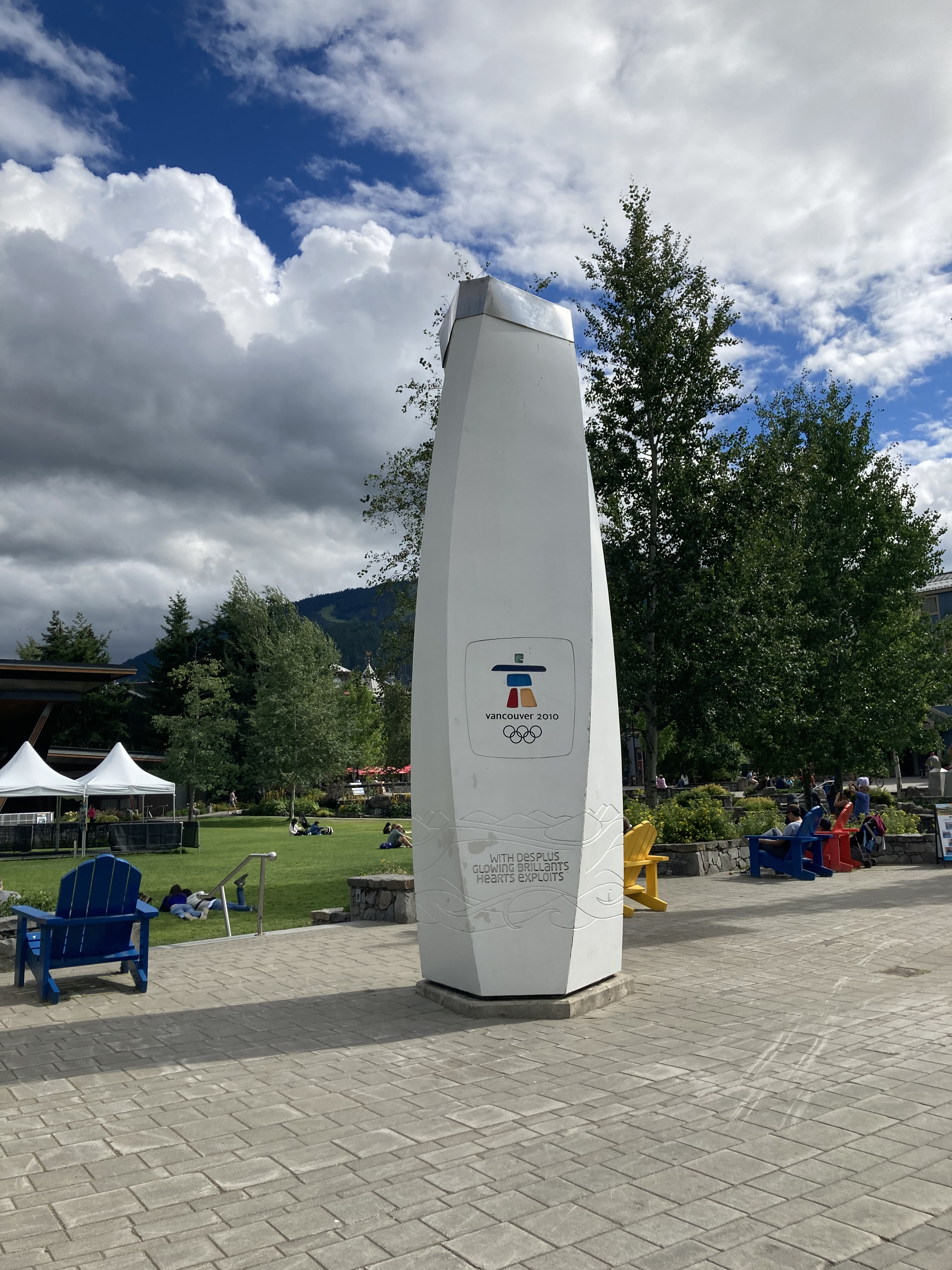
The Olympic Cauldron at Whistler for the 2010 Winter Olympics

Whistler is located on British Columbia Highway 99, also known as the "Sea to Sky Highway", approximately 58 km (36 mi) north of Squamish, and 125 km (78 mi) from Vancouver. The highway connects Whistler with the British Columbia Interior via Pemberton-Mount Currie to Lillooet and connections beyond to the Trans-Canada and Cariboo Highways.

Passenger rail service is only provided at the Whistler railway station between Vancouver and Jasper by the Rocky Mountaineer, using Canadian National Railway tracks from North Vancouver via Whistler and Prince George. The station for tour passengers embarking from Whistler is in the Southside area, between Nita and Alpha Lakes.

Local bus transit service is provided by the Whistler Transit System, formerly the Whistler and Valley Express, which also provides service to Pemberton.

A shuttle bus service from Vancouver International Airport and Downtown Vancouver is provided by the Whistler Shuttle and YVR Skylynx.

Local airports include:

- Pemberton Regional Airport
- Whistler (Municipal) Heliport
- Whistler/Green Lake Water Aerodrome

== Education ==
The School District 48 Sea to Sky operates public schools in Whistler. There are two elementary schools, Myrtle Phillip Elementary and Spring Creek Elementary. There is one high school in the community, it is named Whistler Secondary School.

The Conseil scolaire francophone de la Colombie-Britannique operates one Francophone primary school in that city: the école La Passerelle.

== Media ==
=== Print media ===
Whistler has one weekly newspaper, Pique Newsmagazine, published every Friday. The Whistler Answer was published intermittently from 1977 to the 1990s. The Lost Duck is a monthly events guide and calendar that lists what is happening in the resort. Other tourist-oriented, print media such as FAQ, Visitors Choice and Whistler Magazine are published from quarterly to once or twice a year.

=== Radio ===
Frequency	Call sign	Branding	Format	Owner	Notes
FM 88.7	CFTW-FM	Whistler Information Radio	Tourist information	Four Senses Entertainment	
FM 90.7	CFMI-FM-1	Rock 101	Classic hits	Corus Entertainment	Rebroadcaster of CFMI-FM (Vancouver)
FM 92.3	CFOX-FM-1	CFOX	Alternative rock	Corus Entertainment	Rebroadcaster of CFOX-FM (Vancouver)
FM 96.9	CJAX-FM-1	Jack	Adult hits	Rogers Radio	Rebroadcaster of CJAX-FM (Vancouver)
FM 100.1	CBYW-FM	CBC Radio One	Talk radio, public radio	Canadian Broadcasting Corporation	Rebroadcaster of CBU (Vancouver)
FM 101.5	CKEE-FM	Whistler FM	Adult contemporary	Four Senses Entertainment	
FM 102.1	CISW-FM	Mountain FM	Adult contemporary	Rogers Radio	Rebroadcaster of CISQ-FM (Squamish)
FM 103.1	CBUF-FM-10	Ici Radio-Canada Première	Talk radio, public radio	Canadian Broadcasting Corporation	Rebroadcaster of CBUF-FM (Vancouver)

An internet radio site for the community exists It is designed to be a community radio station showcasing local music talent and interests of relative importance. History: 28 November 2003, "Feds shut down local pirate radio station... frequency 105.5 FM in the Whistler area, received a visit from Industry Canada and local RCMP officer", Federal Police. Freeradio Whistler still legally broadcasts over the Internet at freewhistler.com.

=== Television ===
OTA channel	Shaw Cable	Call sign	Network	Notes
9 (VHF)	11	CHAN-TV-7	Global	Rebroadcaster of CHAN-DT (Vancouver)
18 (UHF)	6	CHWM-TV-1	Independent	Rebroadcaster of CHEK-DT (Victoria)
21 (UHF)	13	CJWM-TV	Citytv	Rebroadcaster of CKVU-DT (Vancouver)

The incumbent cable television provider in Whistler is Shaw Cable. Additional service providers covering Whistler include Telus Optik TV (Optik Internet Protocol television (IPTV) service and Telus Satellite TV), Shaw Direct (satellite), and Bell Satellite TV (satellite).

Whistler was previously served by CBUWT-TV channel 13, a CBC Television repeater of CBUT-DT (Vancouver); that station shut down in 2012 due to budget cuts affecting the CBC.

=== In media ===
The television show Whistler took place in Whistler. The series is a Canadian television drama centring on the aftermath of the mysterious death of a local snowboard legend. The series was set in the ski resort of the same name and aired for two seasons from 2006 to 2008.

The television series Peak Season is filmed in Whistler and documents the lives of people that live there. Reality show Fresh Meat II was filmed in Whistler. The community also appeared as the location for Shane and Carmen's wedding in The L Word (season 3, episode 12). Whistler was also featured on The Real Housewives of Orange County and ABC's Extreme Weight Loss.

Reality show Gene Simmons Family Jewels filmed some episodes in Whistler. It is an American reality television series that premiered on A&E on 7 August 2006. The show follows the life of Kiss bassist and vocalist Gene Simmons, his longtime partner and wife Shannon Tweed, and their two children Nick and Sophie.

Sophie Tweed-Simmons had her own reality TV series spin off. Filming began in December 2013, in Whistler, Vancouver, Los Angeles, and Nashville. Sophie and her mother, model Shannon Tweed, were the focus of the new show. The producers of the show are Force Four Entertainment, Vancouver. Eight half-hour episodes were broadcast on W Network Canada in spring 2014.

Kansai Television of Japan produced a 1 1/2-hour TV special, Race to the Canadian Northern Lights in Whistler. Thirty minutes of footage on Whistler's winter activities, shopping, Village and spa. The show aired in March 2001. It had a viewership of 3 million and had an estimated public relations value of $2 million.

Stewardess Cops Fuji Television, a.k.a. Fuji Network, a popular Japanese drama, shot a two-hour special on location in Whistler during the fall of 2001. It aired in January 2002 and had an estimated audience of 22 million.

Besides the 2010 Winter Olympics, broadcasters from the United States, Australia's Today Show, and Japan have done segments from Whistler.

ESPN2 shows BMX races from Whistler but they are actually from Pemberton's Green River BMX Track.

Most videos of Whistler Backcountry skiing, snowboarding, and snowmobiling are filmed in the Pemberton Valley. The Whistler name has a much higher brand recognition.

=== Movies ===
The Crash Reel, a 2013 documentary and reality film, directed by Academy Award Nominee Lucy Walker, was filmed on location in Whistler. It features top-ranked American snowboarder Kevin Pearce, who because of injuries missed the 2010 Winter Olympics, dealing with his rival Shaun White. It was a selection for the Whistler Film Festival, the Montreal World Film Festival and the Sundance Film Festival.

Ski School, a 1991 comedy, with Dean Cameron, was filmed on location partially, in Whistler and on the mountain.

The X-Files: I Want to Believe (2008) used the glacier above the community to stand in for Antarctica.

Why Did I Get Married? (2008), which was directed, written and starred Tyler Perry, was shot on the slopes of Whistler Blackcomb ski resort.

White Fang 2: Myth of the White Wolf (1994) was directed by Ken Olin, and stars Scott Bairstow, Alfred Molina, Geoffrey Lewis and Ethan Hawke. Whistler is the back drop for this Walt Disney Pictures film.

The Grey (2011), which was directed by Joe Carnahan. Liam Neeson sips cocktails in The Cure Bar at Whistler's Nita Lake Lodge.

== Notable people ==
- Tom Thomson (1942–present), CFL football player, retired to Whistler and served on the town council

== Gallery ==
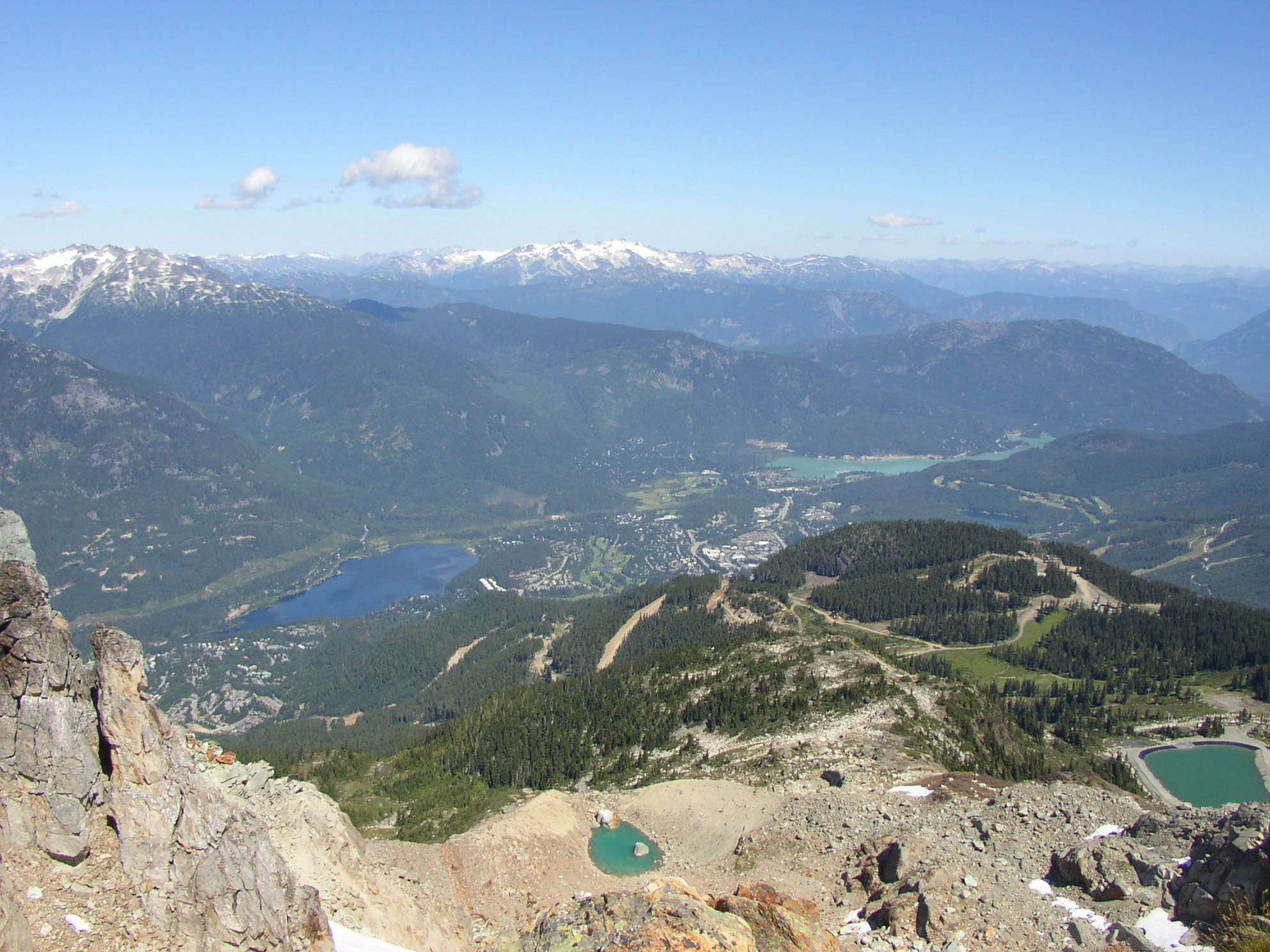
View of Whistler from Whistler Mountain.

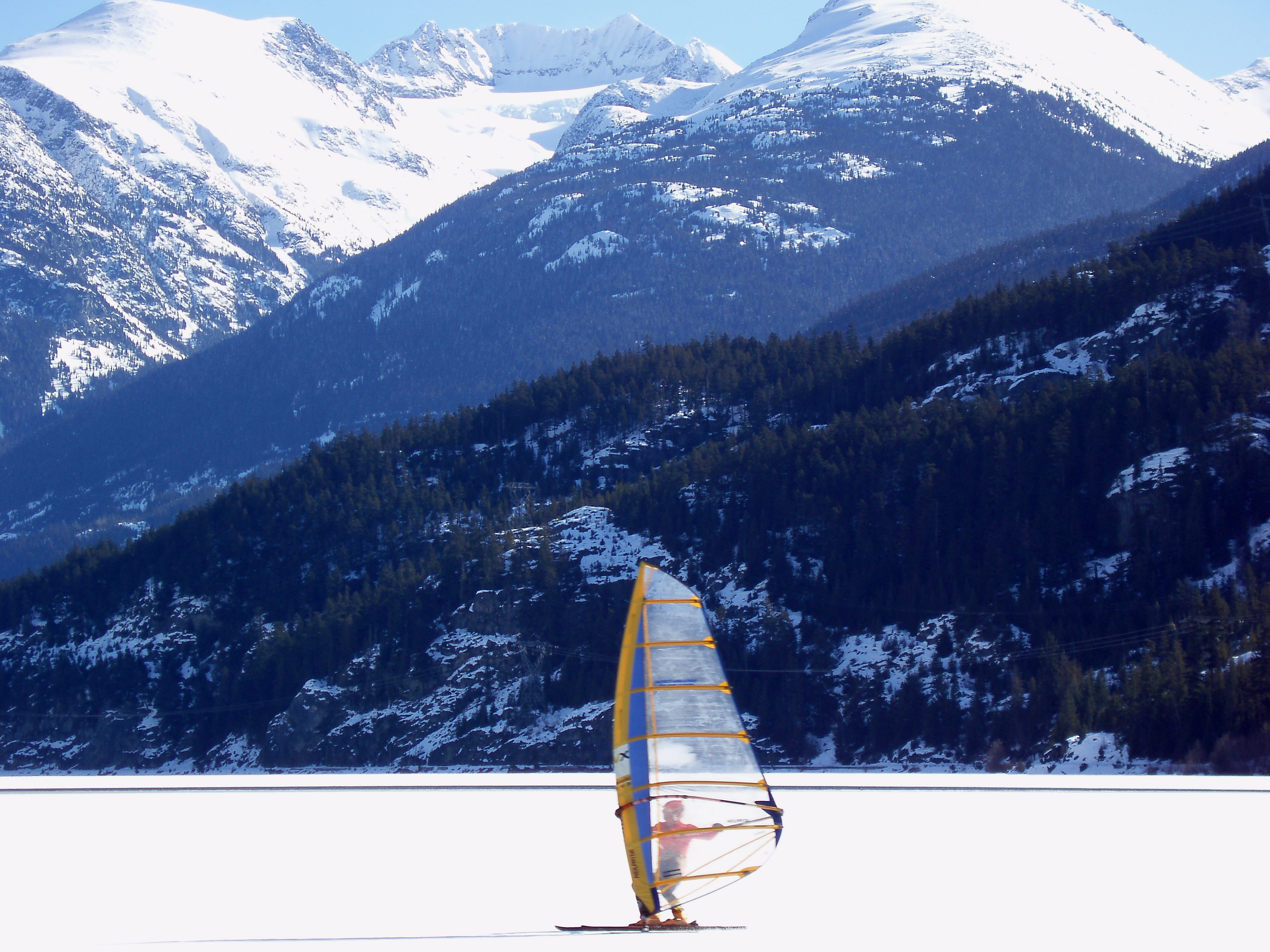
Ice sailing in Whistler.

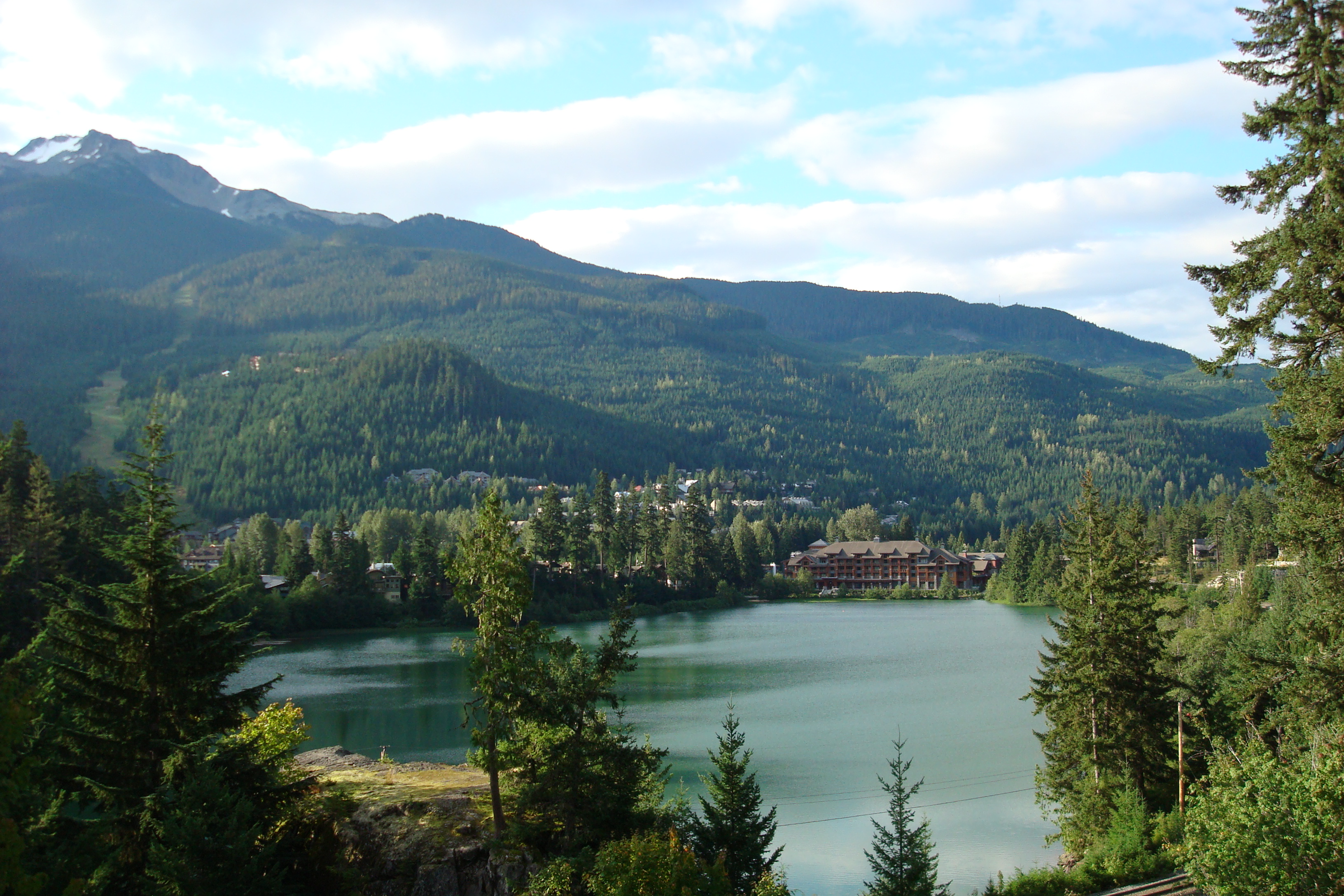
Whistler Mountain as seen from Nita Lake in summer

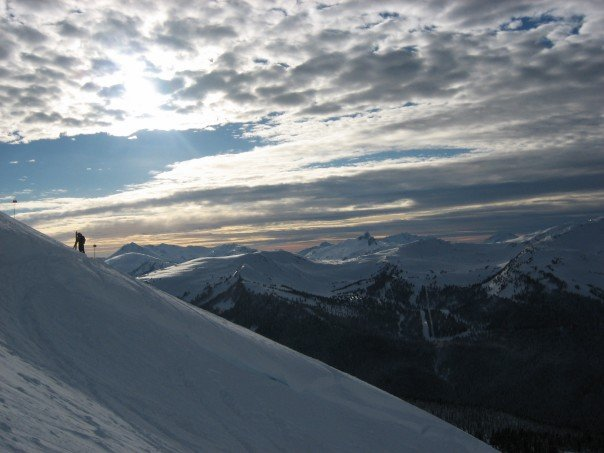
The "Stairway To Heaven" area boundary on Blackcomb Mountain in winter.

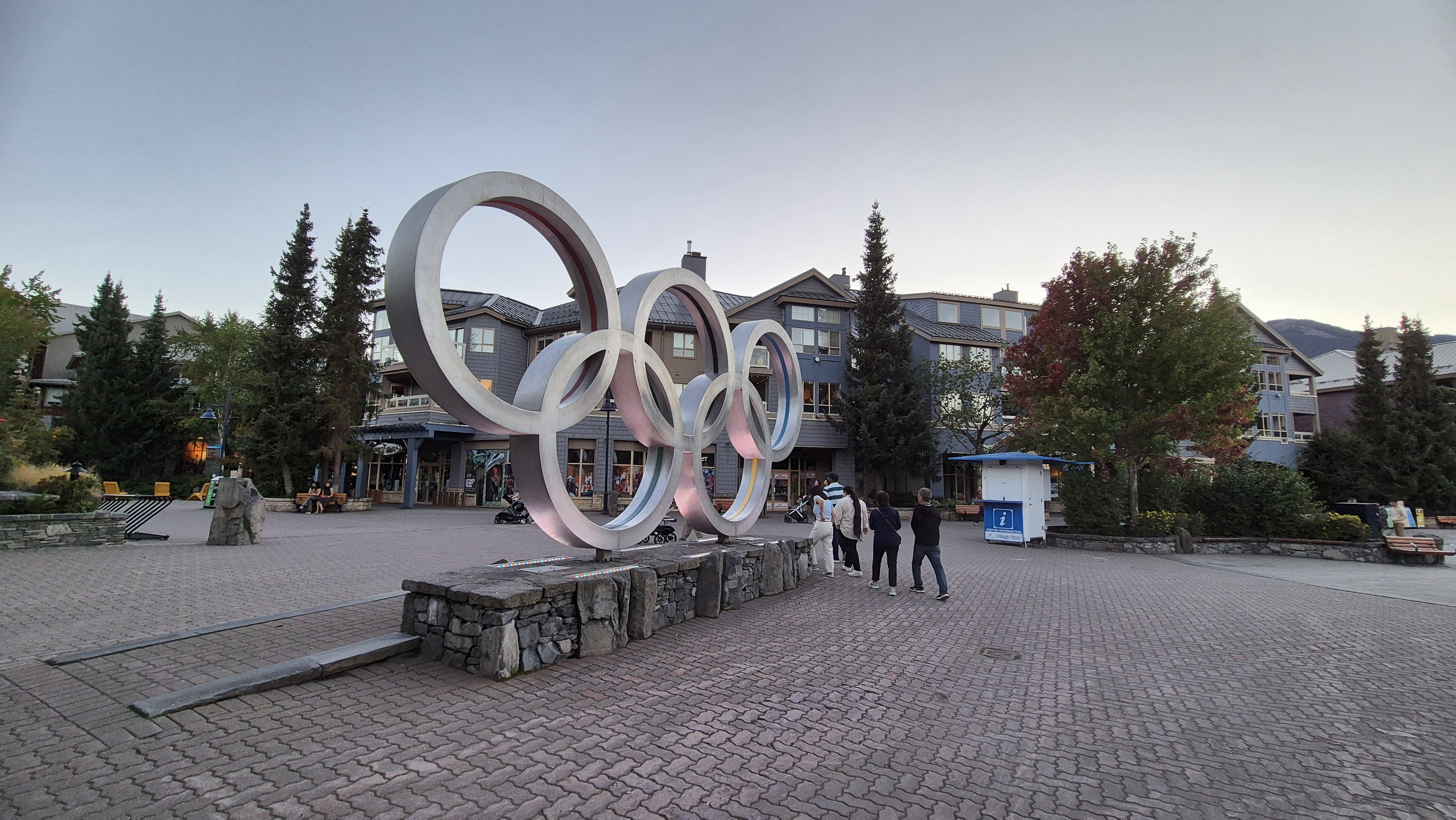
The Olympic Rings in Whistler Village
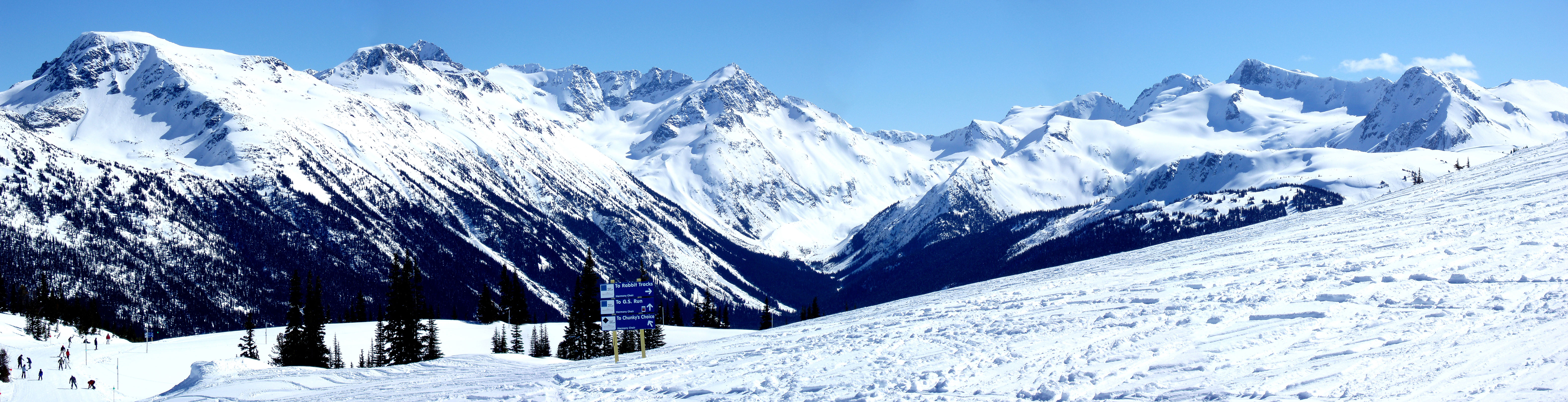
Looking southwest from Whistler Mountain

== See also ==
- List of francophone communities in British Columbia
- List of neighbourhoods in Whistler, British Columbia
- Blackcomb Peak
- Mount Cayley volcanic field
- Garibaldi Lake volcanic field
