= Tenquille Mountain =

Mountain in British Columbia, Canada

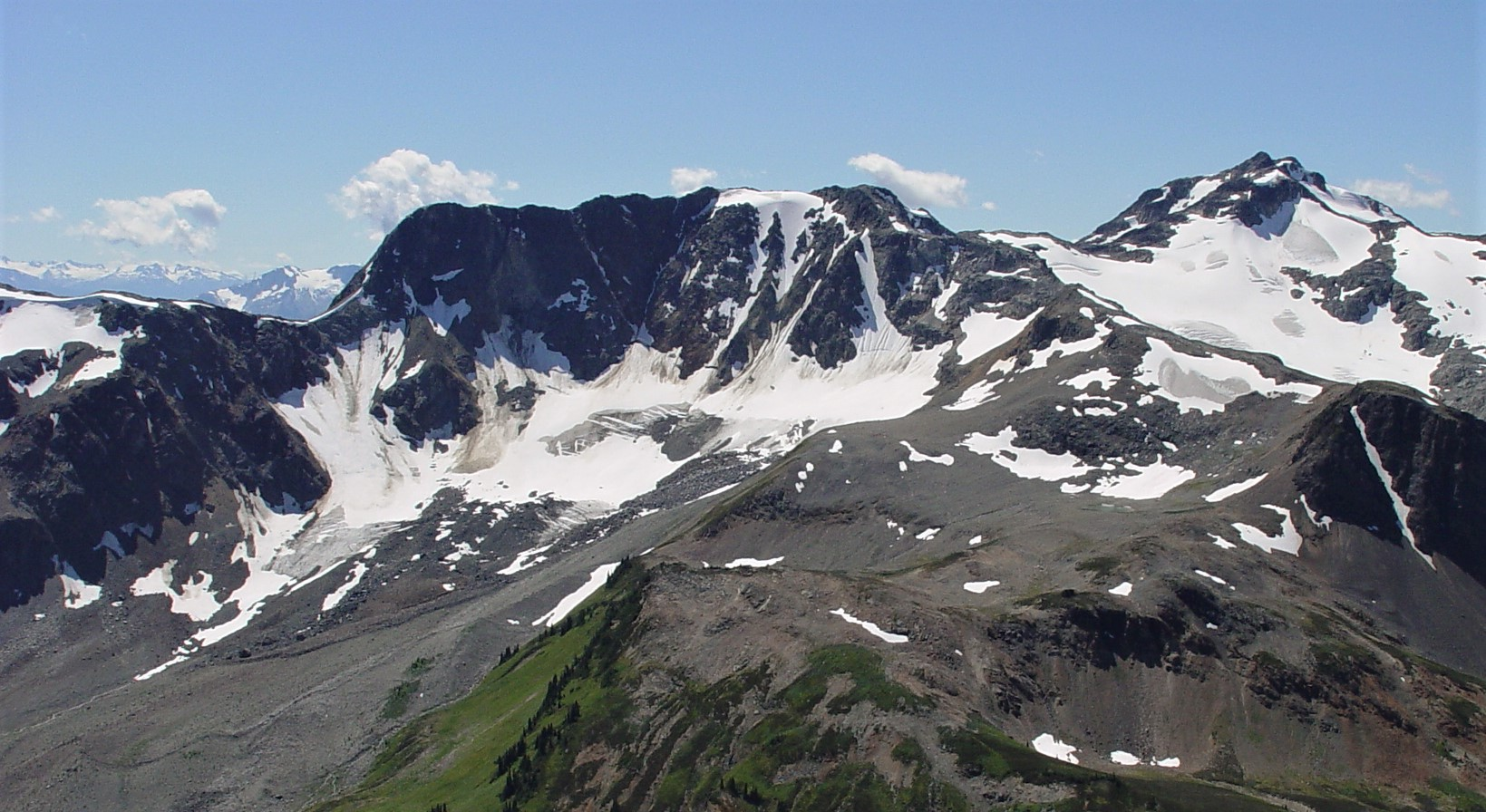
- North aspect, centered (Goat Peak to right)

Highest point
- Elevation: 2,391 m (7,844 ft)
- Prominence: 106 m (348 ft)
- Parent peak: Goat Peak (2,473 m)
- Isolation: 1.1 km (0.68 mi)
- Listing: Mountains of British Columbia
- Coordinates: 50°33′00″N 122°56′34″W

Geography
- Location within British Columbia Location within Canada
- Interactive map of Tenquille Mountain
- Location: British Columbia, Canada
- District: Lillooet Land District
- Parent range: Coast Mountains
- Topo map: NTS 92J10 Birkenhead Lake

Tenquille Mountain is a 2,391-metre (7,844-foot) summit located in the Pemberton Valley of British Columbia, Canada.

== Description ==
Tenquille Mountain is situated in the Coast Mountains, 28 km (17 mi) north-northwest of Pemberton and immediately north of Tenquille Pass and Tenquille Lake. Precipitation runoff from the mountain's slopes drains southwest into Wolverine Creek which is a tributary of the Lillooet River; northwest to Hurley River; northeast into Headquarters Creek and southeast into Tenquille Creek which are both tributaries of Birkenhead River. Tenquille Mountain is more notable for its steep rise above local terrain than for its absolute elevation as topographic relief is significant with the summit rising 2,150 meters (7,054 ft) above Lillooet River and Pemberton Valley in approximately 5 km (3.1 mi). The mountain is on unceded territory of the Lil'wat and N'Quatqua, which is an important spiritual, cultural and food gathering area. The area surrounding Tenquille Lake is habitat for the South Chilcotin grizzly bear, black bear, mountain goat, wolverine, wolf, and deer. The mountain's name was recommended by mountaineer Karl Ricker in association with Tenquille Pass, which in turn was identified in Canadian Alpine Journal in 1936. The toponym was officially adopted January 23, 1979, by the Geographical Names Board of Canada.

== Climate ==
Based on the Köppen climate classification, Tenquille Mountain is located in a subarctic climate zone of western North America. Most weather fronts originate in the Pacific Ocean, and travel east toward the Coast Mountains where they are forced upward by the range (Orographic lift), causing them to drop their moisture in the form of rain or snowfall. As a result, the Coast Mountains experience high precipitation, especially during the winter months in the form of snowfall. Winter temperatures can drop below −20 °C with wind chill factors below −30 °C. This climate supports an unnamed glacier on the northwest slope. The months July through September offer the most favorable weather for climbing Tenquille Mountain.

== See also ==
- Geography of British Columbia
