= Goat Peak (British Columbia) =

Mountain in British Columbia, Canada

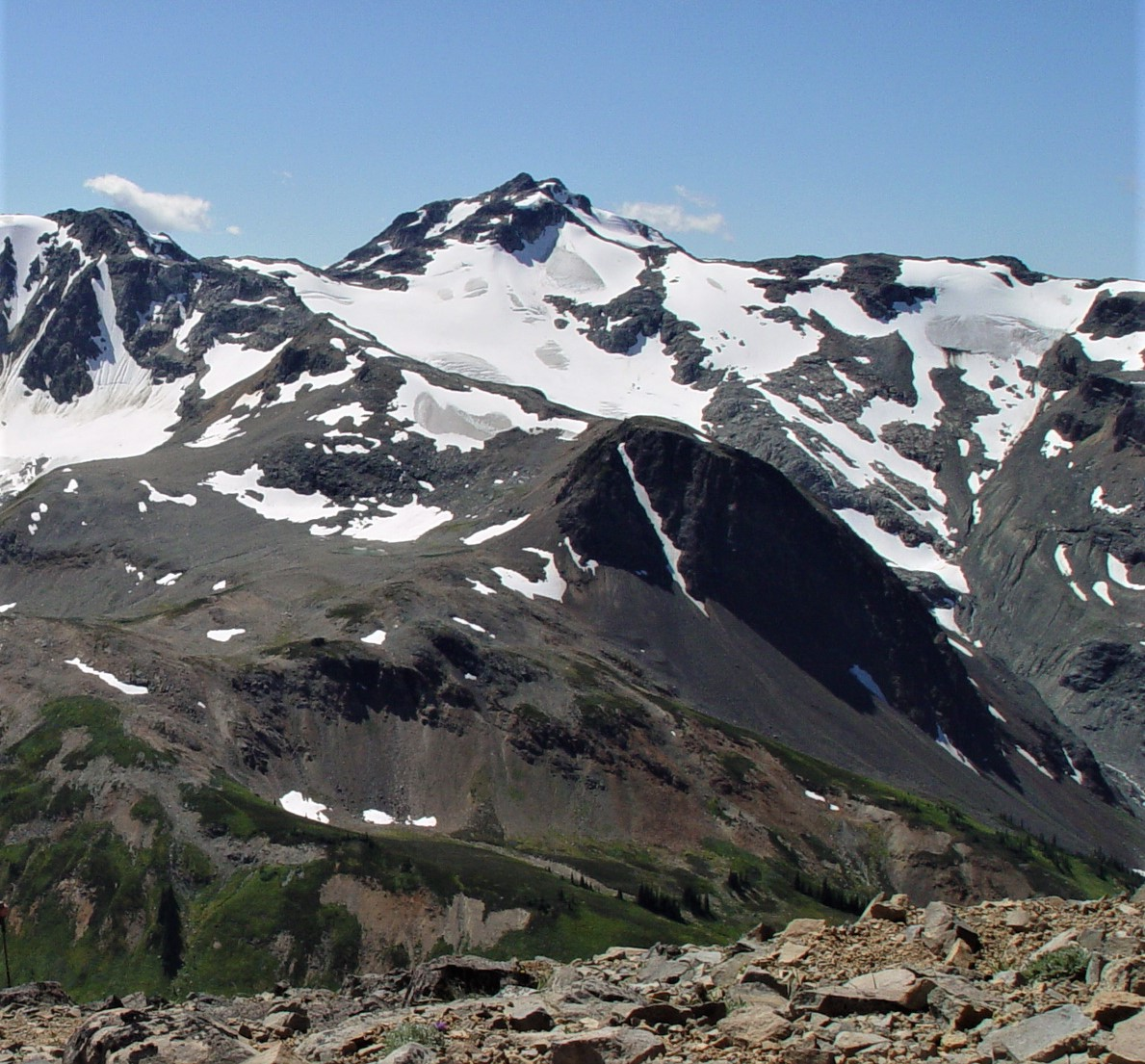
- North aspect

Highest point
- Elevation: 2,473 m (8,114 ft)
- Prominence: 744 m (2,441 ft)
- Parent peak: Face Mountain (2,485 m)
- Isolation: 10.14 km (6.30 mi)
- Listing: Mountains of British Columbia
- Coordinates: 50°32′48″N 122°57′18″W

Geography
- Location within British Columbia Location within Canada
- Interactive map of Goat Peak
- Country: Canada
- Province: British Columbia
- District: Lillooet Land District
- Parent range: Coast Mountains
- Topo map: NTS 92J10 Birkenhead Lake

Goat Peak is a 2,473-metre (8,114-foot) summit located in the Pemberton Valley of British Columbia, Canada.

== Description ==
Goat Peak is situated in the Coast Mountains, 28 km (17 mi) north-northwest of Pemberton and one kilometer immediately west of Tenquille Mountain. Precipitation runoff from the mountain's slopes drains south into Wolverine Creek and west into Mowich Creek which are both tributaries of the Lillooet River; and north to Hurley River. Goat Peak is more notable for its steep rise above local terrain than for its absolute elevation as topographic relief is significant with the summit rising 2,230 meters (7,316 ft) above Lillooet River and Pemberton Valley in less than 5 km (3.1 mi). The mountain is on unceded territory of the Lil'wat and N'Quatqua, which is an important spiritual, cultural and food gathering area. The surrounding area is habitat for the South Chilcotin grizzly bear, black bear, mountain goat, wolverine, wolf, and deer. The mountain's toponym was officially adopted December 31, 1970, by the Geographical Names Board of Canada. The landform was originally identified as "Goat Mountain" in 1936 by the Canadian Alpine Journal.

== Climate ==
Based on the Köppen climate classification, Goat Peak is located in a subarctic climate zone of western North America. Most weather fronts originate in the Pacific Ocean, and travel east toward the Coast Mountains where they are forced upward by the range (Orographic lift), causing them to drop their moisture in the form of rain or snowfall. As a result, the Coast Mountains experience high precipitation, especially during the winter months in the form of snowfall. Winter temperatures can drop below −20 °C with wind chill factors below −30 °C. This climate supports unnamed glaciers on the north and northeast slopes. The months July through September offer the most favorable weather for viewing or climbing Goat Peak.

== Gallery ==
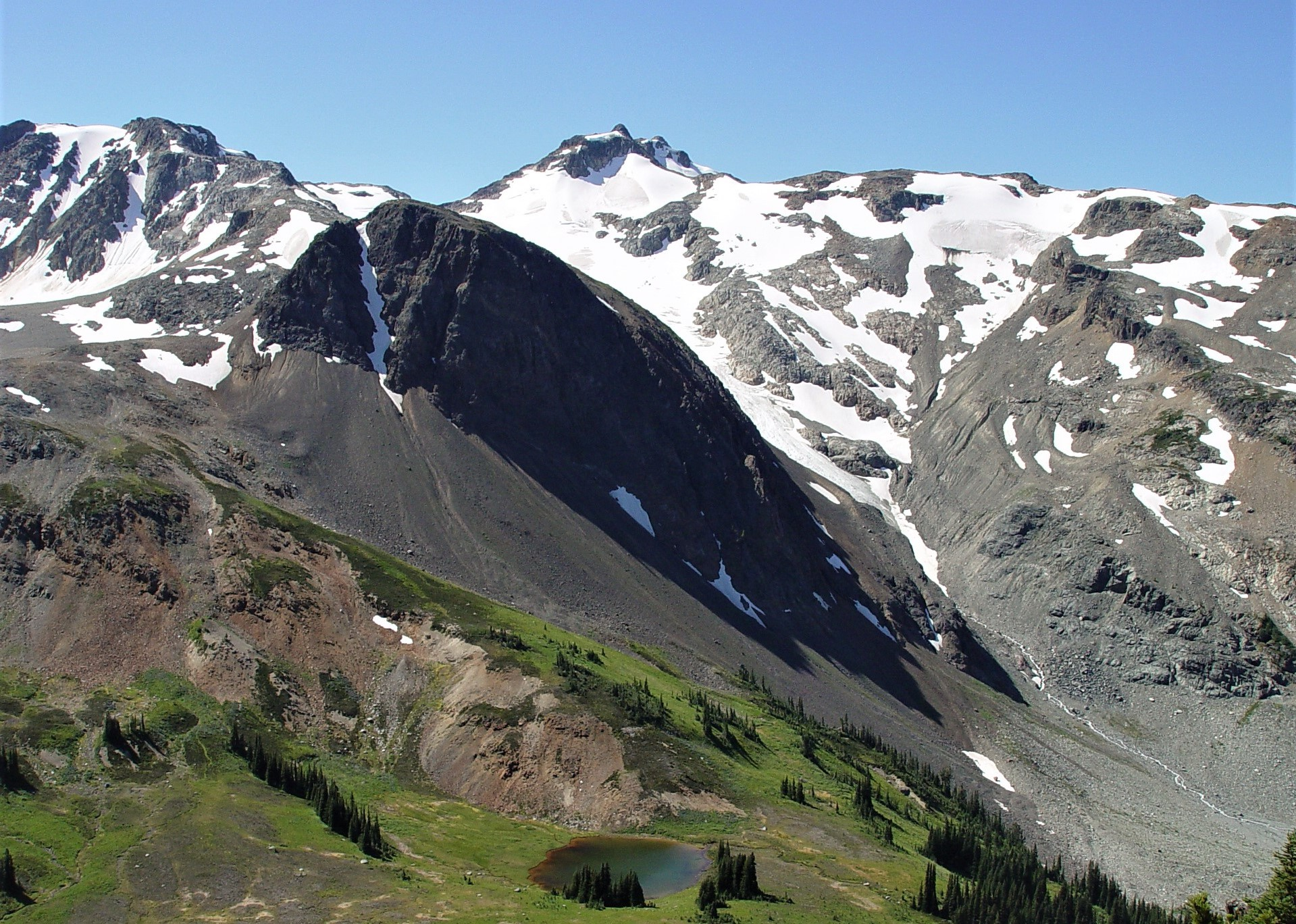
Goat Peak, from slopes of Chipmunk Mountain. Tenquille Mountain in upper left.

== See also ==
- Geography of British Columbia
