= Birken =

Birken may refer to:

- Birken, British Columbia, an unincorporated community in southern British Columbia, Canada
- Birkenhead River in BC, Canada
- Birkenhead Peak, a mountain near the river of the same name in BC, Canada
- Birken Lake in BC, Canada
- Birken Forest Buddhist Monastery, a Buddhist monastery near Kamloops, BC, Canada
- Birkebeinerrennet, a long-distance cross-country ski race in Norway
- Birken, Radevormwald, near Radevormwald, Germany
- Birken, Morsbach, near Morsbach, Germany

== People with the surname ==
- Sigmund von Birken, German author, member of the Fruitbearing Society
