= Pemberton Pass =

Mountain pass in British Columbia, Canada

- Location within British Columbia
- Elevation: 505 m (1,657 ft)

Location
- Location: British Columbia, Canada
- Range: Pacific Ranges
- Coordinates: 50°28′11″N 122°38′37″W
- Topo map: NTS 92J7 Pemberton

Pemberton Pass, 505 m (1,657 ft), also formerly known as Mosquito Pass, is the lowest point on the divide between the Lillooet and Fraser River drainages, located at Birken, British Columbia, Canada, in the principal valley connecting and between Pemberton and Lillooet. The pass is a steep-sided but flat-bottomed valley (or "thalweg") adjacent to Mount Birkenhead and forming a divide between Poole Creek, a tributary of the Birkenhead River, which joins the Lillooet at Lillooet Lake, and the Gates River which flows northeast from Gates Lake (also known as Birken Lake), at the summit of the pass (also known historically as Summit Lake or Gates Lake), which flows to the Fraser via Anderson and Seton Lakes and the Seton River.

This pass was historically important in the founding of British Columbia during the Fraser River Gold Rush when it was a key link in what was known as the Lakes Route or Douglas Road. In that context it was also known as the Pemberton Portage or Long Portage (Seton Portage, at the lower end of Anderson Lake, was the Short Portage). The wagon road constructed in those times continued in use locally despite the route's general abandonment and isolation after the building of the Cariboo Road farther to the east via the Fraser Canyon, and its road grade remains essentially the same today as the route of the unnumbered route from Mount Currie, on BC Highway 99 to D'Arcy/Nequatque, at the head of Anderson Lake. Also using the valley is the route of the railway, originally constructed as the Pacific Great Eastern but today part of the Canadian National Railway conglomerate.
