= Birkenhead Peak =

Mountain in British Columbia, Canada

- Location within British Columbia
- Interactive map of Birkenhead Peak

Highest point
- Elevation: 2,506 m (8,222 ft)
- Prominence: 1,781 m (5,843 ft)
- Listing: Canada prominent peaks 62nd; Mountains of British Columbia
- Coordinates: 50°30′40″N 122°37′15″W

Geography
- Country: Canada
- Province: British Columbia
- District: Lillooet Land District
- Parent range: Coast Mountains
- Topo map: NTS 92J10 Birkenhead Lake

Birkenhead Peak, commonly known as Mount Birkenhead and sometimes Birkenhead Mountain or Mount Birken (2506 m (8222 ft) prominence: 1781 m) is a mountain in the Gates Valley region of the Lillooet Country of the South-Central Interior of British Columbia, Canada. Located approximately midway between the towns of Lillooet (NE) and Pemberton-Mount Currie, the mountain's very high prominence separates it from the adjoining Cadwallader Range by the pass between Blackwater Creek and Birkenhead Lake.

The mountain was named by Hudson's Bay Company explorer and trader A.C. Anderson on an exploration of the route in 1842 in honour of the crew of HMS Birkenhead; nearby Seton Lake was named in honour of one of its crew who was his school-friend.

The community of Birken is located at its southwest foot, Birkenhead Lake Provincial Park and the lake of the same name are on its northwest. It is framed on its north side by Blackwater Creek, a tributary of the Gates River, and on its southwest by the valley of the Birkenhead River.

== See also ==
- List of Ultras of North America
