= Lorna Williams =

Lorna Williams, OBC, OC (born 1947 or 1948) also known as Wánosts’a7, is an educator, scholar, filmmaker, and Indigenous elder known for her contributions to Indigenous language revitalization and Indigenous education. She is a member of Lilʼwat First Nation of Mount Currie, British Columbia and a Ucwalmícwts speaker. She is professor emerita at the University of Victoria where she was Canada Research Chair in Indigenous knowledge and learning in the faculties of Education and Linguistics. She is past chair of First Peoples' Cultural Council. She sits as an observer on UNESCO's Global Task Force for the International Decade of Indigenous Languages.

== Early life and education ==
As a child, Williams attended first an Indian Day School and then residential school at Saint Joseph's Mission, where her Ucwalmícwts language was lost. When she returned home, community elders helped her relearn her language and she became an English interpreter in her community.

Williams earned a Bachelor's degree from Simon Fraser University and a Doctorate in Educational Psychology from the University of Tennessee.

== Work ==
In 1972, Williams was part of a small group of parents who converted the local Indian Day School into the Xetólacw Community School in Mount Currie, the second school converted to band-controlled in all of Canada. In order to teach the bilingual and bicultural curriculum that the community wanted, Williams helped develop a writing system for the Ucwalmícwts language as well as a teacher training program and curriculum materials in both Ucwalmícwts and English.

Williams was part of the Constitution Express movement in 1980–1982, which advocated for the inclusion of Indigenous rights in the Constitution Act 1982 when Canada's constitution was patriated from the UK.

Starting in 1984, she worked as a First Nations Education Specialist with the Vancouver School Board. She spent three years as Director of the Aboriginal Education Enhancement Branch at the BC Ministry of Education, directing research, policy, and implementation in all areas of education for Indigenous students. Williams' work in Vancouver schools is the subject of the documentary The Mind of a Child, which she co-produced and which won a Canada Award at the 1997 Geminis. The film follows Williams' research into Reuven Feuerstein's education methods for child survivors of the Holocaust, and her work adapting these for First Nations education.

Williams was board chair of the First Peoples' Cultural Council during the development of the first FirstVoices typing apps and the Our Living Languages exhibit with the Royal BC Museum.

In 2004, Williams joined the University of Victoria as the founding Director of Aboriginal Education. In 2008 she began a Canada Research Chair position and Onowa McIvor became the new Director of what was now called Indigenous education. Williams led the creation of undergraduate and graduate degrees in Indigenous Language Revitalization, and a Master's in Counselling in Indigenous Communities.

She created a required course in Indigenous Education for all teacher education programs at the university, and co-chaired a task force for the BC Deans of Education to require all BC teacher education programs to include an Indigenous education course. She co-chaired a Canadian Deans of Education report to achieve the same federally.

She retired from the university at the end of 2013. She works around the world as a teacher, mentor, and education consultant, including with the UNESCO Decade of Indigenous Languages.

== Publications ==
=== Books ===
- Knowing Home: Braiding Indigenous Science With Western Science, Book 1 (2016), ed. with Gloria Snively
- Knowing Home: Braiding Indigenous Science With Western Science, Book 2 (2016), ed. with Gloria Snively
- Sima7: Come Join Me (1991) ISBN 0-88865-077-9
- Exploring Kingfisher Lake With Elaine (1986) ISBN 0-88894-907-3
- Exploring Mount Currie (1984)
- Cuystwí malh Ucwalmícwts: Lillooet Legends and Stories. (1981) ed. with Martina Larochelle and Jan van Eijk ISBN ISBN 0-920938-03-5
- Cuystwí malh Ucwalmícwts: Ucwalmícwts curriculum for intermediates (1979), with Jan van Eijk and Gordon Turner ISBN 0-920938-01-9.

=== Films ===
- The Mind of a Child: Working with Children Affected by Poverty, Racism and War (1995)
- First Nations: The Circle Unbroken (1993)

== Awards and honors ==
- 2021 Pierre Elliott Trudeau Fellow
- 2020 Officer of the Order of Canada
- 2018 Indspire Award for Education
- 2016 Honorary Doctor of Laws, Simon Fraser University
- 1993 Member of the Order of British Columbia
