= Lillooet Country =

Region of British Columbia, Canada

The Lillooet Country, also referred to as the Lillooet District, is a region spanning from the central Fraser Canyon town of Lillooet west to the valley of the Lillooet River, and including the valleys in between, in the Southern Interior of British Columbia. Like other historical BC regions, it is sometimes referred to simply as The Lillooet or even Lillooet, (i.e. without meaning the town of the same name).

The meaning of the name has changed since over time. During the gold rush and into the later 19th Century, the term Lillooet District was synonymous with the Lillooet Mining District and also the Lillooet Land District, which spanned east of the Fraser all the way to the North Thompson River. As development of that region proceeded the sense of "Lillooet District" for that area was abandoned, except in terms of reference to the Land District or the similarly shaped electoral district.

The original Lillooet Country, or "Old Lillooet", lies in the valley of the Lillooet River, the name of which is derived from the St'at'imcets-speaking First Nations people who live there, the Lilʼwat First Nation (Lillooet: líl̓watǝmx), This isolated region, long dependent on Lillooet and on the old Douglas Road and Pemberton Trail routes to the outside world, continued being considered part of the Lillooet Country until after the opening of Hwy 99 from Pemberton via Squamish to North Vancouver, since which time it has slowly become more identified with the modern-era Sea to Sky Corridor. Though largely not considered as "part of the Lillooet Country" nowadays, the Lillooet River valley is the namesake and origin of the concept of the Lillooet Country. Its point-of-access in gold rush times was Port Lillooet, British Columbia, at the south end of Lillooet Lake.

Also part of the Lillooet Country are the valleys between those of the Fraser and the Lillooet Rivers, namely the valleys of the Bridge River, Birkenhead River, Cayoosh Creek and Seton Lake-Anderson Lake-Gates River valley, which is the route of the Canadian National Railway (formerly PGE/BCR) through the district. The basin of the Bridge River, plus the communities of D'Arcy, McGillivray Falls, Seton Portage and Shalalth are collectively known as the Bridge River Country, which is a subarea of the Lillooet Country. After the 1930s the term "Bridge River-Lillooet" came into currency as a result of the chosen masthead of the fledgling Bridge River-Lillooet News, which served the town and environs of Lillooet as well as the mining towns of the upper Bridge River.

The Lillooet Country's boundaries are loosely defined but recognizable to residents of the area. On the northeast, the edge of the Lillooet Country is marked by the summit of the Pavilion Mountain Road and the nearby eastern outlet of Marble Canyon. Down the Fraser Canyon, a spot known as the Big Slide on Highway 12, or the southern outlet of Fountain Valley, form the southwest boundary. On the northwest generally everything north to Churn Creek and Big Bar Ferry is considered to be Lillooet Country. On the west, generally the summit of Cayoosh Pass on Highway 99 near Duffey Lake is recognizable as a "border" of the "modern" meaning of the Lillooet Country. Similarly, Pemberton Pass at Birken Lake is considered to be the outer boundary of the "modern" Lillooet Country, though as noted the Lillooet River valley to its west was the historic core and namesake of the district. Similarly, the entrance to the Bridge River Country via Railroad Pass (aka Railway Pass) between the upper Hurley River and the upper valley of the Lillooet River is a recognizable regional demarcator for locals. A vague distinction is made between the Bridge River Country and "metropolitan Lillooet" such that the lower few miles of the Bridge River, being effectively part of Greater Lillooet, are considered "Lillooet", whereas above that is "in the Bridge River".

== People connected with the Lillooet Country ==
- Caspar Phair
- George Matheson Murray
- Margaret Lally "Ma" Murray
- Masajiro Miyazaki
- Chief Hunter Jack
- Andrew Charles Elliott

== See also ==
- Similkameen Country
- Chilcotin District
- Cariboo
- Fraser Canyon
