= Gates Lake =

Lake in British Columbia, Canada

Gates Lake Birken Lake Tenass Lake Halfway Lake Summit Lake
- Location within British Columbia
- Location: British Columbia
- Coordinates: 50°29′N 122°38′W
- Primary outflows: Gates River
- Basin countries: Canada
- Settlements: Birken

Gates Lake, also known as Birken Lake, Tenass Lake, Halfway Lake, and Summit Lake, is a small lake located at the summit of the Pemberton Portage area of the one-time Lakes Route through the Coast Mountains, located at the summit of a low pass connecting the Upper and Lower Lillooet Country of the Southern Interior of British Columbia. Birken Lake sits at the divide between the Birkenhead and Gates-Seton drainage, known as the Pemberton Pass or Mosquito Pass, and is part of the Gates River drainage.

There are numerous recreational residences surrounding the lake, a small lodge and cabins, and the area's only small store (the Birkenhead Resort) on its northwestern side, adjacent to the main road to D'Arcy, which follows the road grade of the older Douglas Road used by the Lakes Route. Birkenhead Peak (aka Mount Birkenhead) is located above the lake to its northwest, while the Cayoosh Range is located to its southeast, with the Place Glacier partly visible from below. A campground with another set of cabins as well as camping, the Whispering Falls Resort, is just northeast of the lake, below its outlet. The tracks of the Canadian National Railway, originally the Pacific Great Eastern/British Columbia Railway, run along the lake's northwestern shore in front of the Birkenhead Resort. A species of freshwater clams can be found in Gates Lake. The clams were edible in the 1980s.

== See also ==
- List of lakes of British Columbia
- Birkenhead Lake Provincial Park
