= Women and children first =

Unofficial maritime code of conduct

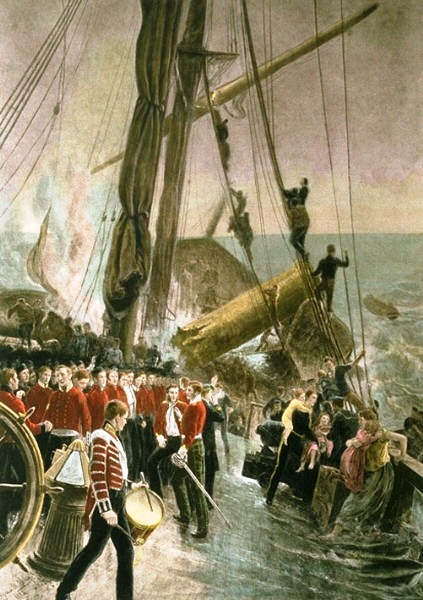
Soldiers stand fast on the deck of HMS Birkenhead in 1852 while women and children head off in a lifeboat, as depicted in Thomas Hemy's painting The Wreck of the Birkenhead (c. 1892).

"Women and children first", known to a lesser extent as the Birkenhead drill, is an unofficial code of conduct and gender role whereby the lives of women and children are to be saved first in a life-threatening situation, typically abandoning ship, when survival resources such as lifeboats are limited.

In the 19th and early 20th centuries, "women and children first" was seen as a chivalric ideal. The concept "was celebrated among Victorian and Edwardian commentators as a long-standing practice – a 'tradition', 'law of human nature', 'the ancient chivalry of the sea', 'handed down in the race'." Its practice was featured in accounts of some 18th-century shipwrecks with greater public awareness during the 19th century.

Notable invocations of the concept include during the 1852 evacuation of the Royal Navy troopship HMS Birkenhead, the 1857 sinking of the ship SS Central America, and most famously during the 1912 sinking of the Titanic. Despite its prominence in the popular imagination, the doctrine was unevenly applied. The use of "women and children first" during the Birkenhead evacuation was a "celebrated exception", used to establish a tradition of English chivalry during the second half of the 19th century.

In a 2012 interview with the BBC, maritime expert Robert Ashdown stated that, in modern-day evacuations, people will usually help the most vulnerable – typically those injured, elderly or very young – to escape first.

A 2012 study by Uppsala University economists argued that the "women and children first" rule is a myth, and that men have a survival advantage in shipwrecks, with a survival rate of 34.5% compared to 17.8% for women in a sample of 18 disasters. The study, which analyzed over 15,000 people across different nationalities and time periods, concluded with the proposition that crew members are also significantly more likely to survive than passengers.

== History ==
=== 19th century ===
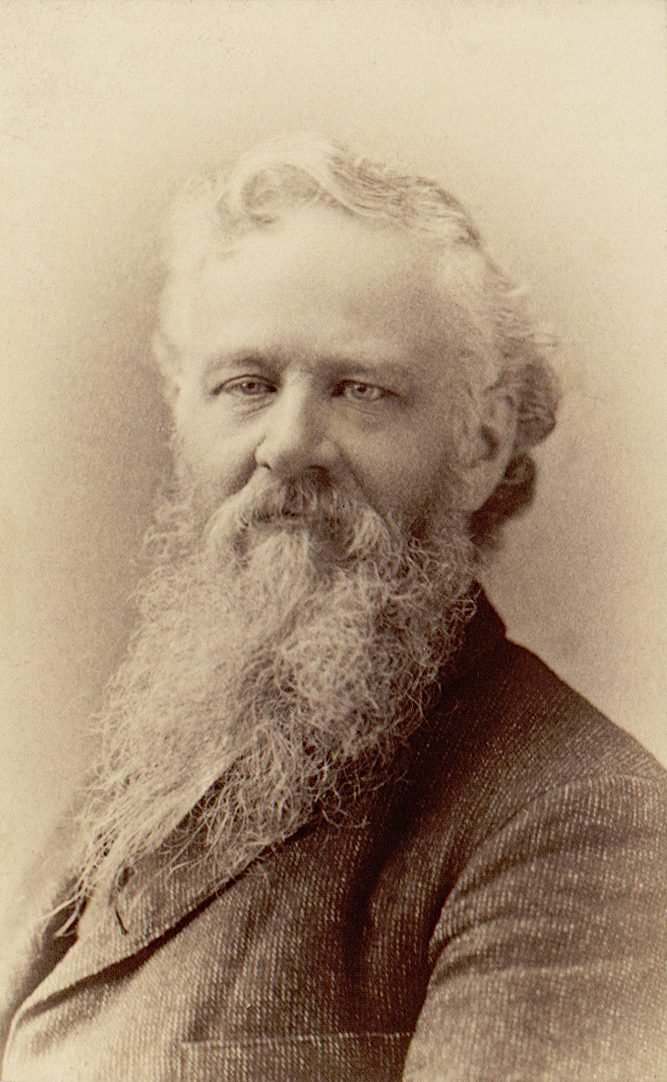
Novelist William Douglas O'Connor

The first documented application of "women and children first" was in May 1840 when, after a lightning strike, fire broke out aboard the American packet Poland en route from New York to Le Havre. According to a passenger, J.H. Buckingham of Boston:

... the captain said that he had little doubt that the ship was on fire, and that we must endeavor to get at it. On a suggestion that we might be obliged to take to the boats, it was immediately remarked by one of our French passengers, and responded to by others – "Let us take care of the women and children first."

This led to a precautionary evacuation of women, children and a few male passengers into the longboat, while the other male passengers and crew remained aboard to fight the blaze. As Buckingham was a journalist, his vivid account of the incident was published first in the Boston Courier, picked up by other papers including The Times (London) and also reprinted in a book published in the same year, thus gaining wide currency.

The phrase appeared prominently in the 1860 novel Harrington: A Story of True Love, by William Douglas O'Connor, during the recounting of the death of Captain Harrington, the father of the eponymous character John Harrington. Captain Harrington's fictional death illustrates not only the concept of "women and children first" but also that of "the captain goes down with the ship".

"Back from the boats," [Captain Harrington] shouts, catchin' up the hand-spike. "The first man that touches a boat I'll brain. Women and children first, men."...

"Timbs," says he, "give my love to my wife and boy, if I never see 'em again. God bless ye, men."...

[Captain Eldad] paused, wiping away with his sleeve the salt tears which the simple epic of a brave man's death brought to his eyes. "That was the story, and them was the last words Timbs brought home to your mother ... An' that's the way he died. Women and children saved. That's a comfort...But he died...

"It was a manly way to leave the world," [John Harrington] said. "Life is sweet to me with the memory of such a father."

— William Douglas O'Connor

During the 19th and early 20th centuries, ships typically did not carry enough lifeboats to save all the passengers and crew in the event of disaster. In 1870, answering a question at the House of Commons of the United Kingdom about the sinking of the paddle steamer Normandy, George Shaw-Lefevre said that,

In the opinion of the Board of Trade, it will not be possible to compel the passenger steamers running between England and France to have boats sufficient for the very numerous passengers they often carry. They would encumber the decks, and rather add to the danger than detract from it.

The practice of prioritising women and children gained widespread currency following the actions of soldiers during the sinking of the Royal Navy troopship HMS Birkenhead in 1852 after it struck rocks. Captain Robert Salmond RN ordered Colonel Seton to send men to the chain pumps; 60 were directed to this task, 60 more were assigned to the tackles of the lifeboats, and the rest were assembled on the poop deck in order to raise the forward part of the ship. The women and children were placed in the ship's cutter, which lay alongside. The sinking was memorialized in newspapers and paintings of the time, and in poems such as Rudyard Kipling's 1893 "Soldier an' Sailor Too".

The La Bourgogne disaster in 1898, when 199 out of 200 women died, as well as all children, may have added to the emphasis on saving women and children. As the ship began sinking, crewmen took all the available lifeboats for themselves. As they were launching the lifeboats, crewmen beat and stabbed passengers who tried to board the boats. Newspaper accounts of the brutal behavior of the crew sparked outrage around the world.

=== 20th century ===
By the turn of the 20th century, larger ships meant more people could travel, but regulations were generally still insufficient to provide for all passengers: for example British legislation concerning the number of lifeboats was based on the tonnage of a vessel and only encompassed vessels of "10,000 gross register tons and over." The result was that a sinking usually involved a moral dilemma for passengers and crew as to whose lives should be saved with the limited available lifeboats.

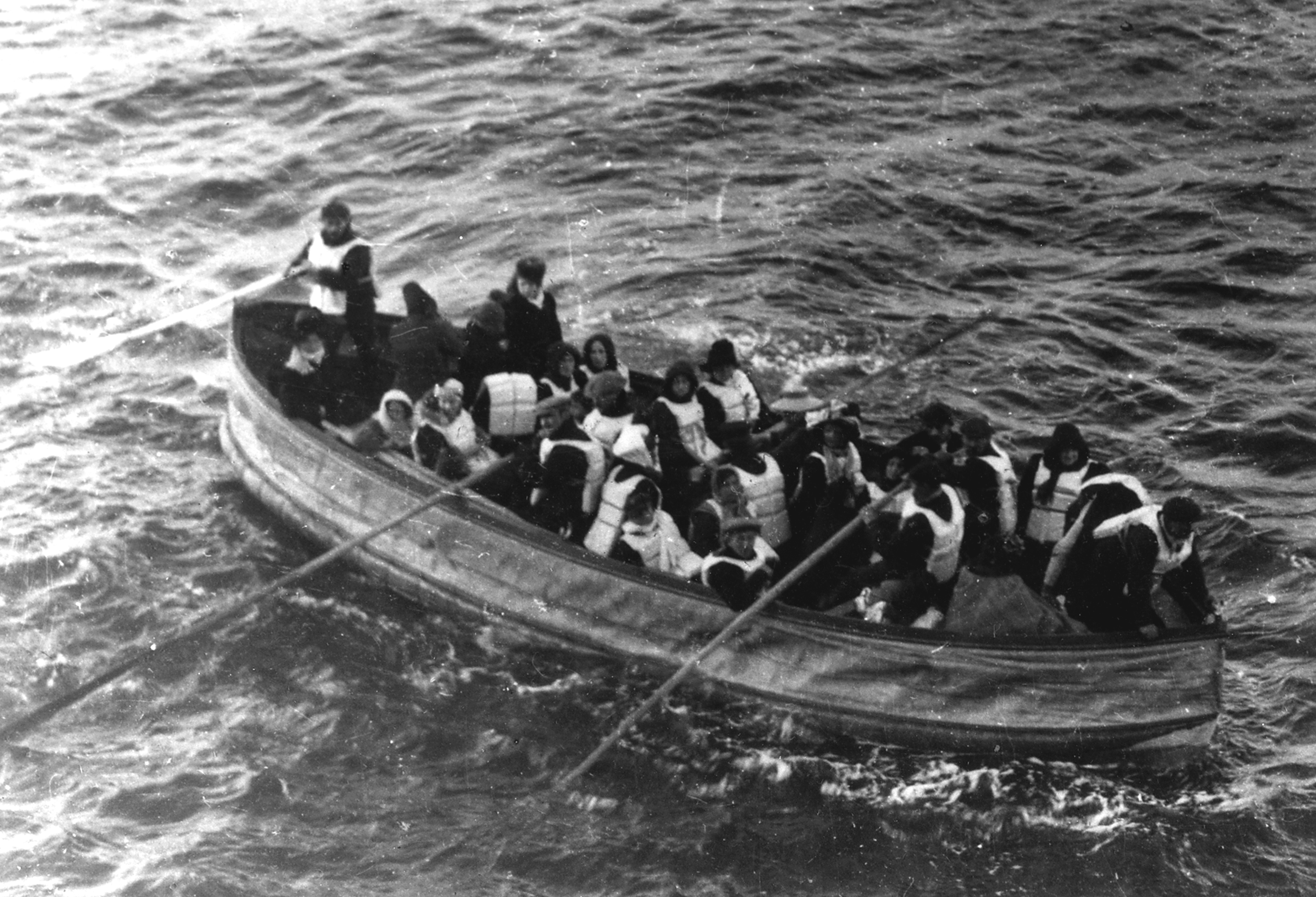
RMS Titanic survivors aboard a collapsible lifeboat

The phrase was popularised by its usage on RMS Titanic. According to Second Officer Charles Lightoller, he suggested to Captain Smith, "Hadn't we better get the women and children into the boats, sir?", to which the captain responded: "Put the women and children in and lower away." The first and second officers (William McMaster Murdoch and Lightoller), in charge of the starboard and port side evacuation respectively, interpreted the evacuation order differently; Murdoch took it to mean women and children first, while Lightoller took it to mean women and children only. Second Officer Lightoller lowered lifeboats if there were no women and children waiting to board, while First Officer Murdoch allowed a limited number of men to board if all the nearby women and children had embarked. As a consequence, 74% of the women and 52% of the children on board were saved, but only 20% of the men. It was intended that women and children would board first, with any remaining free spaces for men. Because not all women and children were saved on the Titanic, the few men who survived, like White Star chairman J. Bruce Ismay, were initially branded as cowards.

=== 21st century ===
There is no legal basis for the protocol of women and children first in international maritime law.

In the Boy Scouts of America's Sea Scouting program, "Women and children first" was considered "the motto of the sea" and was part of the Sea Promise until 2020.

In February 2020, a mural of the sinking of HMS Birkenhead, bearing the slogan, was painted on the side of Gallaghers Traditional Pub in Birkenhead.

== See also ==
- William Lewis Herndon, captain of the sinking SS Central America
- Male expendability
- SS Arctic disaster, a contrary case
