= Mount Currie, British Columbia =

Mount Currie
- Location of Mount Currie in British Columbia
- Coordinates: 50°18′59″N 122°43′04″W
- Country: Canada
- Province: British Columbia
- Region: Lillooet Country
- Regional District: Squamish-Lillooet
- Postal code: V0N 2K0
- Area code: 604
- Highways: Highway 99

Mount Currie is a settlement in the Squamish-Lillooet region of southwestern British Columbia. On BC Highway 99, the locality is by road about 160 kilometres (99 mi) north of Vancouver, 39 kilometres (24 mi) northeast of Whistler, and 92 kilometres (57 mi) southwest of Lillooet.

The Lillooet Tribal Council governs the First Nations portion. The relatively smaller freehold part is an unincorporated community. The latter business centre approximately encompasses an area where the Macrea Road/Highway 99 intersection forms the southwest corner and the Pemberton Portage Road/Highway 99 intersection forms the northeast corner. The First Nations reserves straddle the Birkenhead River. The eastern portion of the reserves extends north to the same latitude as the Owl Creek community but is well back from the river at that point.

== First Nations ==
=== Early community ===
In 1846, Alexander Caulfield Anderson visited Lillooet Village (not to be confused with later named Lillooet). On a grassy island 5 kilometres (3 mi) above Lillooet Lake, the residents numbered 50 men (plus women and children). The island lies in the vicinity of the later Owl Creek general community. In 1881, the government created a 2,000-hectare (5,000-acre) reserve at Mount Currie, upon which the people cultivated fine crops and orchards by the early 1900s.

Fire destroyed the initial Catholic church building and a new one was erected in 1896. The bell from a demolished Vancouver church was offered to the band, who transported this extremely heavy gift northward by cart and canoe. The bell hung in the Mount Currie church steeple from about 1905 until 1948, when the church burnt down and the bell tumbled. After spending 20 years in Whistler, the bell returned to now hang at the old village site in an open-air steeple, ringing on the passing of band members.

By 1933, only 350 people resided on the reserve. The cemetery indicated that many never survived early childhood.

Census population: Mount Currie Indian reserve
Year	Pop.	±%
2001	1,054	—
2006	1,181	+12.0%
2011	1,306	+10.6%
2016	1,285	−1.6%
2021	1,242	−3.3%
Source: Statistics Canada

The one-room school, which opened at Mount Currie in the 1930s, was called the Pemberton Indian Day School. The two Catholic sisters, who joined the two lay teachers in 1948, took full charge a year later. In 1958, a second building was erected, which housed grades 1–7 classrooms and a residential section for staff. The 1930s building became a kindergarten.

=== Later community ===
The Lil'wat First Nation, who comprise most of the Mount Currie population, are of the Interior Salish people and form part of the Upper Lillooet language group of the St'at'imc Nation. Groups to the south form the Lower Lillooet part of the nation.

In the early 1970s, the school transferred to indigenous control becoming the Ts̓zil Community School but is now called the Xet̓ólacw Community School. The Lil'wat language and culture are an integral part of the curriculum.

The Lil'wat also operate their own gas station and grocery store.

The Stl’atl’imx Tribal Police are based at Mount Currie.

== Name origin ==
The post office was called Creekside. The Creekside train station was about half a mile east of the Chilsampton one. In 1956, the post office name changed to Mount Currie as did the Chilsampton station. The new name derives from the mountain, which recognizes John Currie of Pemberton. Ts̓zil is the original name for the mountain.

== Early Mount Currie general community ==
The meadows north of the settlement were among the first privately held land on the BC mainland. P. Smith and Co. received the first preemption. John Shaw received the second one. These two properties form part of the present Mount Currie reserve.

John Charles McKay was the inaugural Creekwood postmaster 1938–1945.

About 1923, Bill Kiltz (of Lillooet Lake Trading Co) built the first Creekside store, a log cabin structure opposite the present church. After being lost to fire, a new store was erected near the train station. Since the building was demolished during the 1950s school expansion, this would likely be the Creekwood station. Kiltz sold groceries, hardware, basic clothing, and some pharmaceuticals. In 1946, Gerry and Florence Cowell took over. In 1950, Hector and Adele Harwood converted the store to a restaurant.

By 1937, A. William (Bill) Spetch, Samuel's son, moved the Owl Creek store/post office to Creekside to serve the indigenous village, but that post office soon closed. George and Adeline Williams already had a store in their home on the reserve, which continued until the early 1950s. In 1940, Bill Spetch sold the store to his brother Walter. Initially leased by Jack and Alice McKay, the couple purchased the business in 1943. Bill repurchased it in 1947. While Bill operated a logging partnership with George Walker, George McDonald ran the store. In 1955, Bill opened a dry goods store, which others ran for him. Called Penny's, then Mount Currie Dry Goods, this was the first true clothing store in the area. Bill's wife Jean managed the business by the mid-1960s. Bill built a hardware store, to which the post office moved. Initially rented out, the enterprise was sold in 1957, as was the original grocery store. Down the road, Gerry Boulanger ran a taxi service to Pemberton and a small café. In the 1950s, Hector Harwood ran a small café by the railway.

After the church on the reserve burned, the present St. Christopher's replaced it, being built on freehold land to serve all Catholics. Mount Currie held an annual parade and races in May. The rodeo appeared in the CBC documentary Pemberton Valley (1957). The Trap was a movie filmed at Birkenhead Lake and Mount Currie, using indigenous extras.

The community hall opened in 1968.

== Owl Creek general community ==
In 1905, a water-powered 10,000-kilogram (23,000 lb) sawmill came for a short period to produce lumber for the hatchery buildings. The main building, which was 46 by 12 metres (150 by 40 ft), had a 25-million egg capacity. The nearby two-storey boarding house was 4.9 by 7.3 metres (16 by 24 ft). Trapping fences were installed in the Birkenhead River. Prior to closure in 1936, the hatchery provided various part-time local employment.

In 1908, Samuel Spetch relocated his store/post office from Birken. He was the inaugural Owl Creek postmaster 1908–1929. By 1918, his house was one of the few in the district with indoor plumbing. At the time, he also had a water-powered sawmill at Owl Creek and another mill at Spetch Siding.

During the era, the continuous forest bordering the Pemberton Portage hosted several pole and tie manufacturers.

Sam Spetch's petitioning was instrumental in the creation of the Correspondence Branch of the BC Department of Education in 1919. His children were the first three students.

In 1929, A.William (Bill) Spetch took over his father's store at Owl Creek, which thrived from both the hatchery and valley customer base. By 1937, Bill had moved the store/post office to Creekside.

Owl Creek now comprises scattered rural properties.

== Transportation ==
Road and railway access has been similar to Pemberton. The northward advance of the Pacific Great Eastern Railway (PGE) rail head passed in November 1914. The nearest train stations in 1922 were about 7.6 kilometres (4.7 mi) northeast at Spetch and 7.9 kilometres (4.9 mi) west at Pemberton. By 1947, the regular stops northeastward from Pemberton were 7.4 kilometres (4.6 mi) to Chilsampton, 1.0 kilometre (0.6 mi) to Creekside, 3.1 kilometres (1.9 mi) to Owl Creek, and 19.2 kilometres (11.9 mi) to Birken. By 1959, the flag stops northeastward from Mount Currie were 8.2 kilometres (5.1 mi) to Spetch and then 15.1 kilometres (9.4 mi) to Birken.

== Later Mount Currie general community ==
The mainstays of agriculture and forestry have since been supplemented by tourism and service-based industries, where improved internet has enabled professionals to work from home. Flooding presents the greatest hazard in the area.

The annual Lil'wat Nation Open Rodeo continues to be held at Mount Currie in May.
