= HMS Birkenhead (1845) =

Steam troopship of the Royal Navy

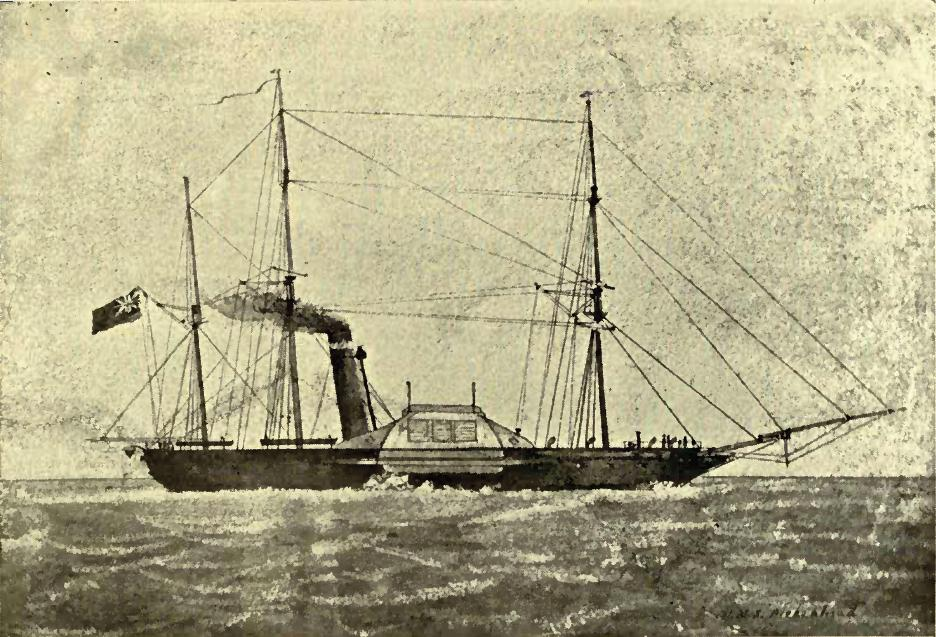
- A contemporary drawing of the ship

History

United Kingdom
- Name: HMS Birkenhead
- Namesake: Vulcan, Birkenhead
- Builder: John Laird shipyard, Birkenhead
- Launched: 30 December 1845
- Christened: HMS Vulcan
- Renamed: HMS Birkenhead, 1845
- Reclassified: Troopship, 1851
- Fate: Wrecked 26 February 1852 at Danger Point near Gansbaai, Cape Colony

General characteristics
- Class & type: Frigate, later troopship
- Displacement: 1918 tons as designed (2000 tons loaded)
- Tons burthen: 1400 bm
- Length: 210 ft (64 m)
- Beam: 37 ft 6 in (11 m)
- Draught: 15 ft 9 in (5 m)
- Propulsion: Sail, plus 2 George Forrester & Co. 564 hp (421 kW) steam engines driving two 6 m (20 ft) diameter paddle wheels
- Sail plan: Brig, later barquentine
- Speed: 10 knots (19 km/h) as a troopship
- Complement: 125
- Armament: 2 × 96-pounder pivot guns; 4× 68-pounder broadside guns
- Notes: Iron hull; renamed HMS Birkenhead before commissioning

HMS Birkenhead, also referred to as HM Troopship Birkenhead or Steam Frigate Birkenhead, was one of the first iron-hulled ships built for the Royal Navy. She was designed as a steam frigate, but was converted to a troopship before being commissioned.

While transporting troops and a few civilians to Algoa Bay, the Birkenhead was wrecked on 26 February 1852 at Danger Point near Gansbaai, 87 miles (140 km) from Cape Town in the Cape Colony. There were insufficient serviceable lifeboats for all the passengers, and the soldiers famously stood in ranks on board, allowing the women and children to board the boats safely and escape the sinking.

Only 193 of the estimated 643 people on board survived, and the soldiers' chivalry was one of the earliest known instances of the unofficial "women and children first" protocol when abandoning ship. The "Birkenhead drill" of Rudyard Kipling's poem came to describe courage in the face of hopeless circumstances.

== Description and history ==
The Birkenhead was laid down at John Laird's shipyard at Birkenhead as the frigate HMS Vulcan, but renamed Birkenhead soon afterwards after the town where she was built. She had two 564 horsepower (421 kW) steam engines from Forrester & Co that drove a pair of 6-metre (20 ft) paddle wheels, and two masts rigged as a brig.

According to her designer, John Laird:

The designs I submitted, and which were finally approved, were of a vessel 210 feet (64 m) long (being about 20 feet (6.1 m) longer than any vessel of her class had been built), and 37 feet 6 inches (11.43 m) beam with a displacement of 1,918 long tons (1,949 t) on the load water-line of 15 feet 9 inches (4.80 m). The only change made by authorities at the Admiralty in these designs was the position of the paddle shaft, which they ordered to be moved several feet more forward; the change was unfortunate as it makes the vessel, unless due care is taken in stowing the hold, trim by the head. With this exception, I am answerable for the model, specification, displacement and general arrangement of the hull of the vessel.

The ship was divided into eight watertight compartments, while the engine room was divided by two longitudinal bulkheads into four compartments, making 12 watertight compartments in total. She had a round stern and a bow that ended in a large figurehead of Vulcan, holding a hammer in one hand, and some of "the bolts of Jove" that he had just forged in the other. Her armament was originally intended to be two 96-pounder pivot guns, one forward and the other aft, and four 68-pounder broadside guns. (Note: There is no indication that this armament was ever fitted.)

=== Launch and early life ===
The Birkenhead was launched on 30 December 1845 by the Marchioness of Westminster. Her hull then weighed 903 tons and drew 9.75 feet (2.97 m), although she was at this time missing approximately 15 tons of cabin fittings. Machinery, stores, and other fittings were expected to add an additional 1,000 or so tons, increasing her draught six more feet. She undertook her maiden voyage to Plymouth in 1846, averaging 12 knots (22 km/h) to 13 knots (24 km/h) for the journey.

She remained laid up for some time, before being put to varied use around England, Scotland and Ireland. In November 1846, Isambard Kingdom Brunel's iron ship SS Great Britain ran aground on the sands of Dundrum Bay, Ireland. There was doubt as to whether she could be re-floated. Brunel advised that if anyone could rescue the ship then the man to do it was the naval engineer, James Bremner. He was engaged and the Great Britain was re-floated on 27 August 1847 with the assistance of HMS Birkenhead. (Note: Unfortunately, the cost of the salvage bankrupted her owner, the Great Western Steamship Company, causing the Great Britain to be sold and turned into an emigration ship.)

The Birkenhead was never commissioned as a frigate, as two factors came into play while she was still under construction that resulted in her being converted into a troopship. Firstly, the Royal Navy's warships were switched from paddle wheels to more efficient propeller propulsion, following an experiment by the Admiralty in 1845 in which the benefits of the propeller over the paddle wheel were dramatically demonstrated. Secondly, the Admiralty had doubts about the effects of cannon shot against iron hulls – in a number of trials carried out at the Royal Arsenal in 1845, at lower velocities shot made a jagged hole that was hard to plug.

On 15 September 1847, Birkenhead ran down and sank the brig Oratio in the English Channel off The Lizard, Cornwall. The owners of the brig sued for their loss in the Admiralty Court. Birkenhead was found to be to blame as she had no look-out posted, being nineteen short in her crew.

As part of her conversion to a troopship in 1851, a forecastle and poop deck were added to the Birkenhead to increase her accommodation, and a third mast was added, to change her sail plan to a barquentine. Although she never served as a warship, she was faster and more comfortable than any of the wooden sail-driven troopships of the time, making the trip from the Cape in 37 days in October 1850.

== Final voyage (1852) ==
Location of the sinking

In January 1852, under the command of Captain Robert Salmond RN, the Birkenhead left Portsmouth conveying troops from ten different regiments, including the 2nd Regiment of Foot and the 74th Regiment of Foot, to the Eighth Xhosa War against the Xhosa in the Cape Colony. On 5 January, she picked up more soldiers at Queenstown (now Cobh), Ireland, and conveyed some officers' wives and families. On 23 February 1852, Birkenhead docked briefly at Simon's Town, near Cape Town. Most of the women and children disembarked along with a number of sick soldiers. Nine cavalry horses, several bales of hay and 35 tons of coal were loaded for the last leg of the voyage to Algoa Bay.

She sailed from Simon's Bay at 18:00 on 25 February 1852 with between 630 and 643 men, women and children aboard, the exact number being in some doubt. In order to make the best possible speed, Captain Salmond decided to hug the South African coast, setting a course that was generally within 3 miles (4.8 km) of the shore. Using her paddle wheels, she maintained a steady speed of 8.5 knots (15.7 km/h). The sea was calm and the night was clear as she left False Bay and headed east.

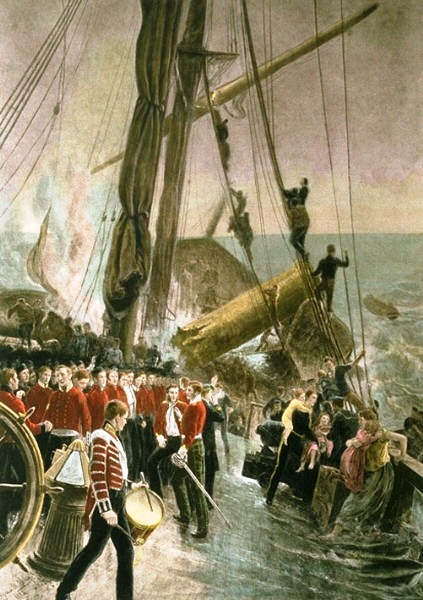
"The Wreck of the Birkenhead" (c. 1892) by Thomas Hemy

Shortly before 02:00 on 26 February, while Birkenhead was travelling at a speed of 8 knots (15 km/h), the leadsman made soundings of 12 fathoms (22 m). Before he could take another sounding, she struck an uncharted rock at 34°38′42″S 19°17′9″E with 2 fathoms (3.7 m) of water beneath her bows and 11 fathoms (20 m) at her stern. The rock lies near Danger Point (near Gansbaai, Western Cape). Barely submerged, this rock is clearly visible in rough seas, but it is not immediately apparent in calmer conditions.

Captain Salmond rushed on deck and ordered the anchor to be dropped, the quarter-boats to be lowered, and a turn astern to be given by the engines. However, as the ship backed off the rock, the sea rushed into the large hole made by the collision and the ship struck again, buckling the plates of the forward bilge and ripping open the bulkheads. Shortly, the forward compartments and the engine rooms were flooded, and over 100 soldiers were drowned in their berths.

=== Sinking ===
The surviving soldiers mustered and awaited their officers' orders. Salmond ordered the senior military officer, Lieutenant-Colonel Alexander Seton, to send men to the chain pumps. Sixty were directed to this task, sixty more were assigned to the tackles of the lifeboats, and the rest were assembled on the poop deck in order to raise the forward part of the ship. The women and children were placed in the ship's cutter which lay alongside. Two other large boats (capacity 150 each) were manned, but one was immediately swamped and the other could not be launched due to poor maintenance and paint on the winches. This left only three smaller boats available.

The surviving officers and men assembled on deck, where Colonel Seton of the 74th Foot took charge of all military personnel and stressed the necessity of maintaining order and discipline to his officers. As a survivor later recounted: "Almost everybody kept silent, indeed nothing was heard, but the kicking of the horses and the orders of Salmond, all given in a clear firm voice."

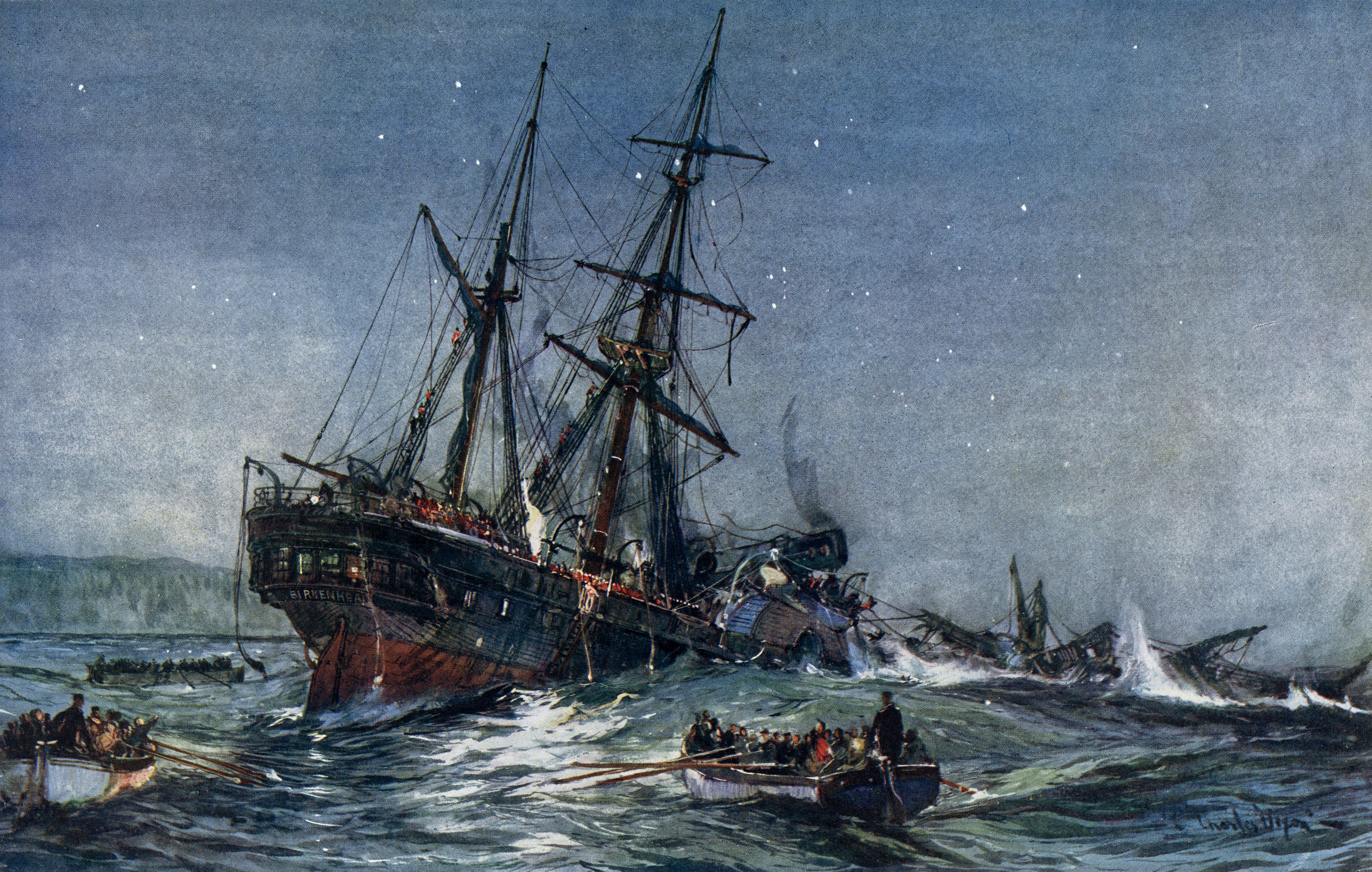
The Wreck of the Birkenhead (1901) by Charles Dixon.

Ten minutes after the first impact, the engines still turning astern, the ship struck again beneath the engine room, tearing open her bottom. She instantly broke in two just aft of the mainmast. The funnel went over the side and the forepart of the ship sank at once. The stern section, now crowded with men, floated for a few minutes before sinking.

Just before she sank, Salmond called out that "all those who can swim jump overboard, and make for the boats". Colonel Seton, however, recognising that rushing the lifeboats would risk swamping them and endangering the women and children, ordered the men to stand fast, and only three men made the attempt. The cavalry horses were freed and driven into the sea in the hope that they might be able to swim ashore.

The soldiers did not move, even as the ship broke up barely 20 minutes after striking the rock. Some of the soldiers managed to swim the 2 miles (3.2 km) to shore over the next 12 hours, often hanging on to pieces of the wreck to stay afloat, but most drowned, died of exposure or were killed by sharks.

I remained on the wreck until she went down; the suction took me down some way, and a man got hold of my leg, but I managed to kick him off and came up and struck out for some pieces of wood that were on the water and started for land, about two miles off. I was in the water about five hours, as the shore was so rocky and the surf ran so high that a great many were lost trying to land. Nearly all those that took to the water without their clothes on were taken by sharks; hundreds of them were all round us, and I saw men taken by them close to me, but as I was dressed (having on a flannel shirt and trousers) they preferred the others. I was not in the least hurt, and am happy to say, kept my head clear; most of the officers lost their lives from losing their presence of mind and trying to take money with them, and from not throwing off their coats.

— Letter from Lieutenant J.F. Girardot, 43rd Light Infantry, to his father, 1 March 1852.

The next morning, the schooner Lioness discovered one of the cutters and, after saving the occupants of the second boat, made her way to the scene of the disaster. Arriving in the afternoon, she found 40 survivors still clinging to the rigging. It was reported that, of the approximately 643 people aboard, only 193 were saved. Captain Edward W.C. Wright of the 91st Argyllshire Regiment was the most senior army officer to survive; he was made a brevet major for his actions during the ordeal, dated 26 February 1852.

The number of personnel aboard is in some doubt, but an estimate of 638 was published in The Times. It is generally thought that the survivors comprised 113 soldiers (all ranks), 6 Royal Marines, 54 seamen (all ranks), 7 women, 13 children and at least one male civilian, but these numbers cannot be substantiated, as muster rolls and books were lost with the ship.

Of the horses, eight made it safely to land, while the ninth had its leg broken while being pushed into the sea.

=== Aftermath ===
A number of sailors were court martialled as a result of the accident. The court was held on 8 May 1852 on board HMS Victory in Portsmouth, and attracted a great deal of interest. However, as none of the senior naval officers of the Birkenhead survived, no one was found to be blameworthy.

Captain Wright told the court martial:

The order and regularity that prevailed on board, from the moment the ship struck till she totally disappeared, far exceeded anything that I had thought could be effected by the best discipline; and it is the more to be wondered at seeing that most of the soldiers were but a short time in the service. Everyone did as he was directed and there was not a murmur or cry amongst them until the ship made her final plunge – all received their orders and carried them out as if they were embarking instead of going to the bottom – I never saw any embarkation conducted with so little noise or confusion.

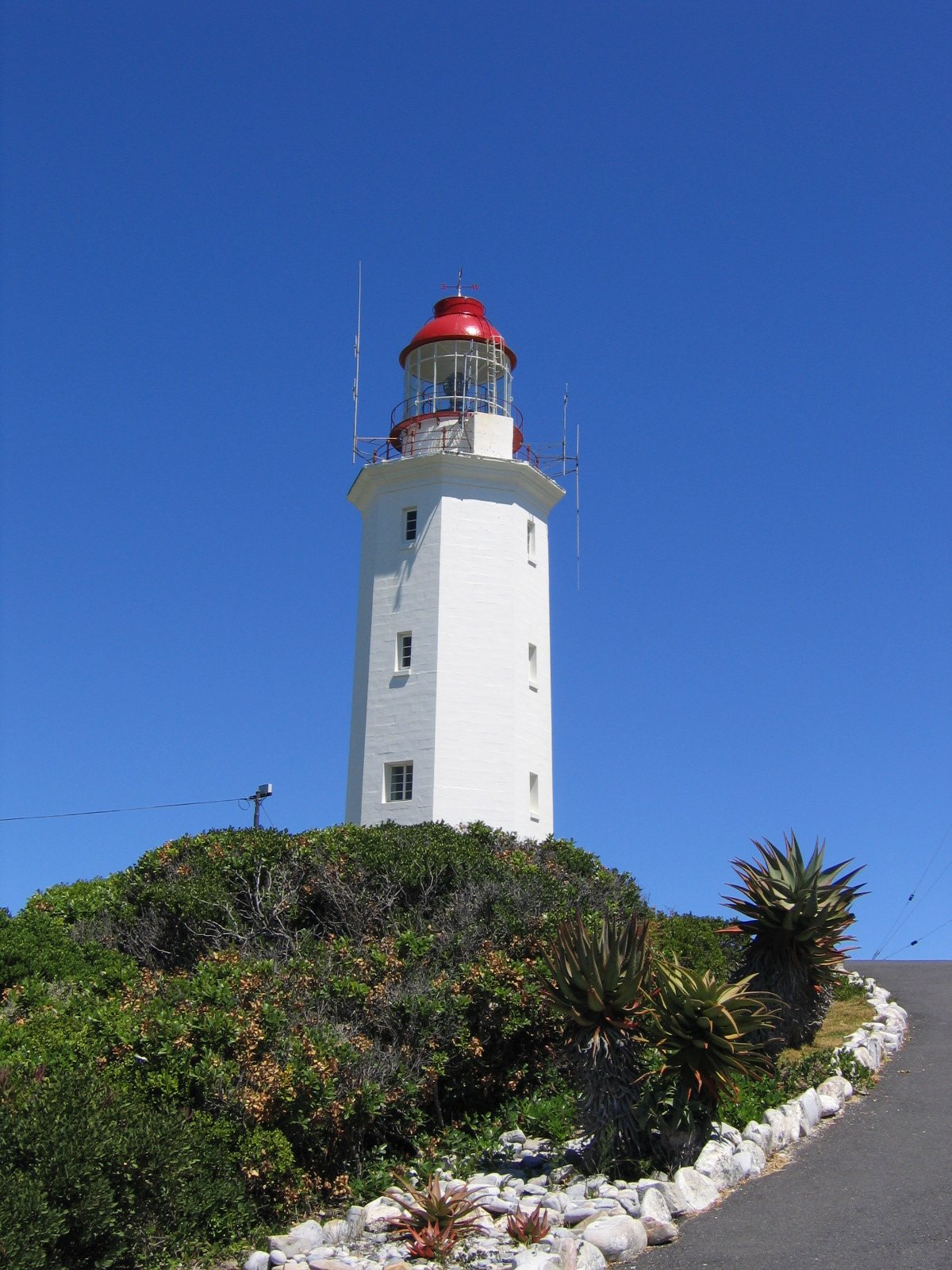
The Danger Point Lighthouse, erected near Gansbaai after the sinking.

In 1895, a lighthouse was erected at Danger Point to warn shipping of the dangerous reef. The lighthouse is about 18 metres (59 ft) tall and is visible for approximately 25 nautical miles (46 km). In 1936, a remembrance plate for the Birkenhead was affixed to its base by the Navy League of South Africa. A Birkenhead memorial was erected nearby in March 1995. The plaque was later moved closer to the lighthouse in 2001.

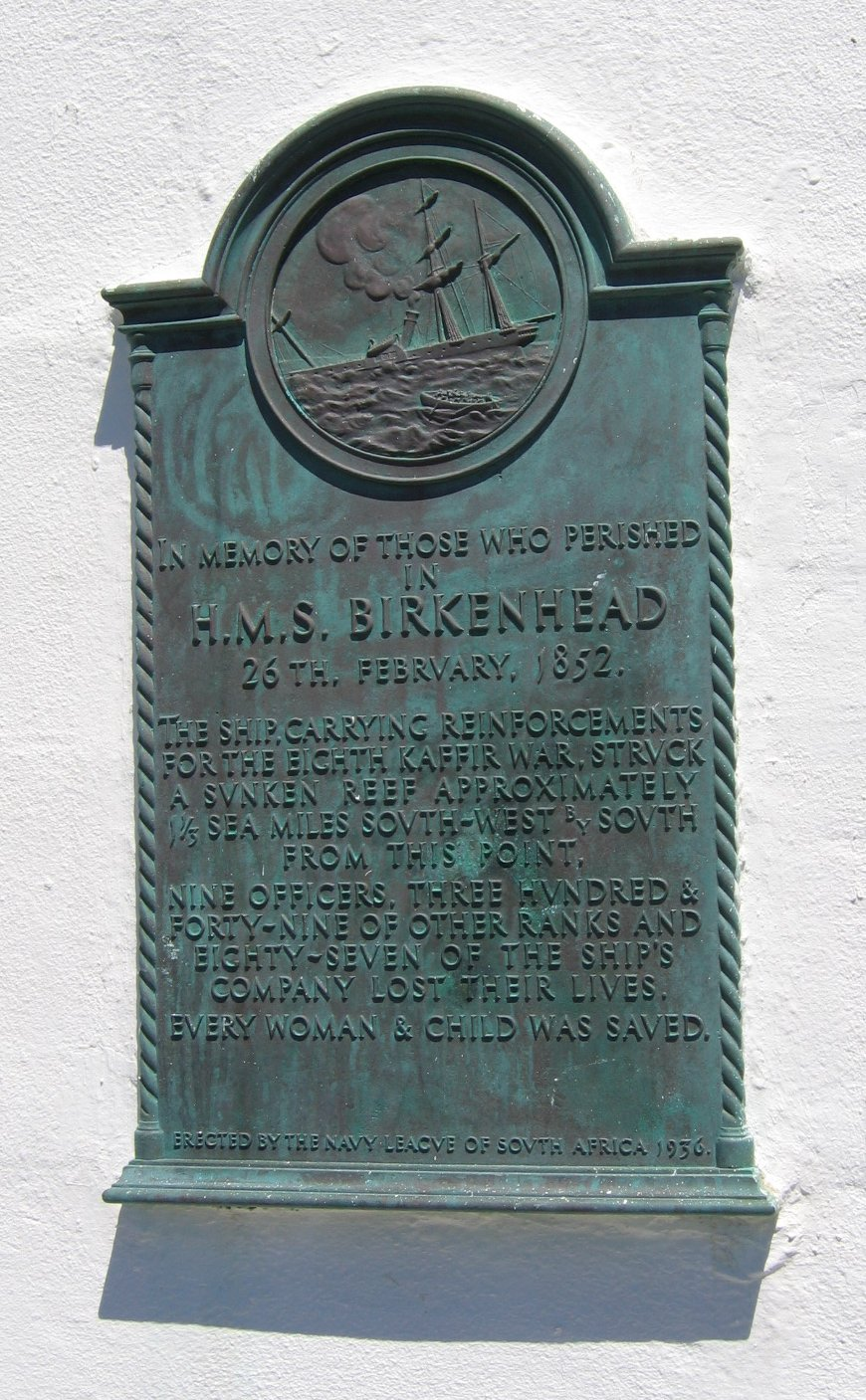
Remembrance plate installed on the lighthouse in 1936

A memorial in St Giles' Cathedral, Edinburgh, bears the following inscription:

In memory of Lieut.-Colonel Alexander Seton, Ensign Alex. C. Russell, and forty-eight N.C.O.s and men of the 74th Highlanders who were drowned at the wreck of H.M.S. 'Birkenhead' on the 26th February 1852, off Point Danger, Cape of Good Hope, after all the women and children on board had been safely landed in the ship's boats.

Frederick William IV of Prussia was so impressed by the bravery and discipline of the soldiers that he ordered an account of the incident to be read at the head of every regiment in his army.

A memorial to those who died in the wreck was later erected at the Royal Hospital Chelsea, bearing an inscription stating that it was placed there by command of Queen Victoria.

In 1892, Thomas M. M. Hemy painted a widely admired maritime depiction of the incident, "The wreck of the Birkenhead".. Prints of this painting were distributed to the public.

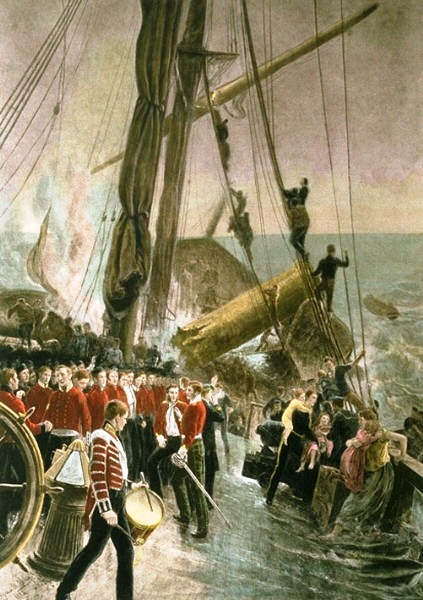
Thomas Hemy's painting The Wreck of the Birkenhead (c. 1892).

In 1977, the South African Mint issued a gold commemorative medallion marking the 125th anniversary of the sinking, featuring Hemy’s painting on one side of the coin.

== Legacy ==
=== Birkenhead drill ===
The sinking of the Birkenhead is one of the earliest maritime disaster evacuations during which the concept of "women and children first" is known to have been applied.

The phrase had earlier antecedents in maritime practice. An eyewitness account of the fire aboard the New York–Le Havre packet Poland in May 1840 described women and children being prioritised during evacuation:

“On a suggestion that we might be obliged to take to the boats it was immediately remarked ... ‘Let us take care of the women and children first.’”

"Women and children first" subsequently became associated with maritime evacuation practice in both fiction and historical accounts, although its application was not universal in real-life disasters.

The term "Birkenhead drill" later became defined as courageous behaviour in hopeless circumstances and appeared in Rudyard Kipling's 1893 tribute to the Royal Marines, "Soldier an' Sailor Too":

To take your chance in the thick of a rush, with firing all about,
Is nothing so bad when you've cover to 'and, an' leave an' likin' to shout;
But to stand an' be still to the Birken'ead drill is a tough bullet to chew,
An' they done it, the Jollies – 'Er Majesty's Jollies – soldier an' sailor too!
Their work was done when it 'adn't begun; they was younger nor me an' you;
Their choice it was plain between drownin' in 'eaps an' bein' mopped by the screw,
So they stood an' was still to the Birken'ead drill, soldier an' sailor too!

=== Birkenhead treasure ===
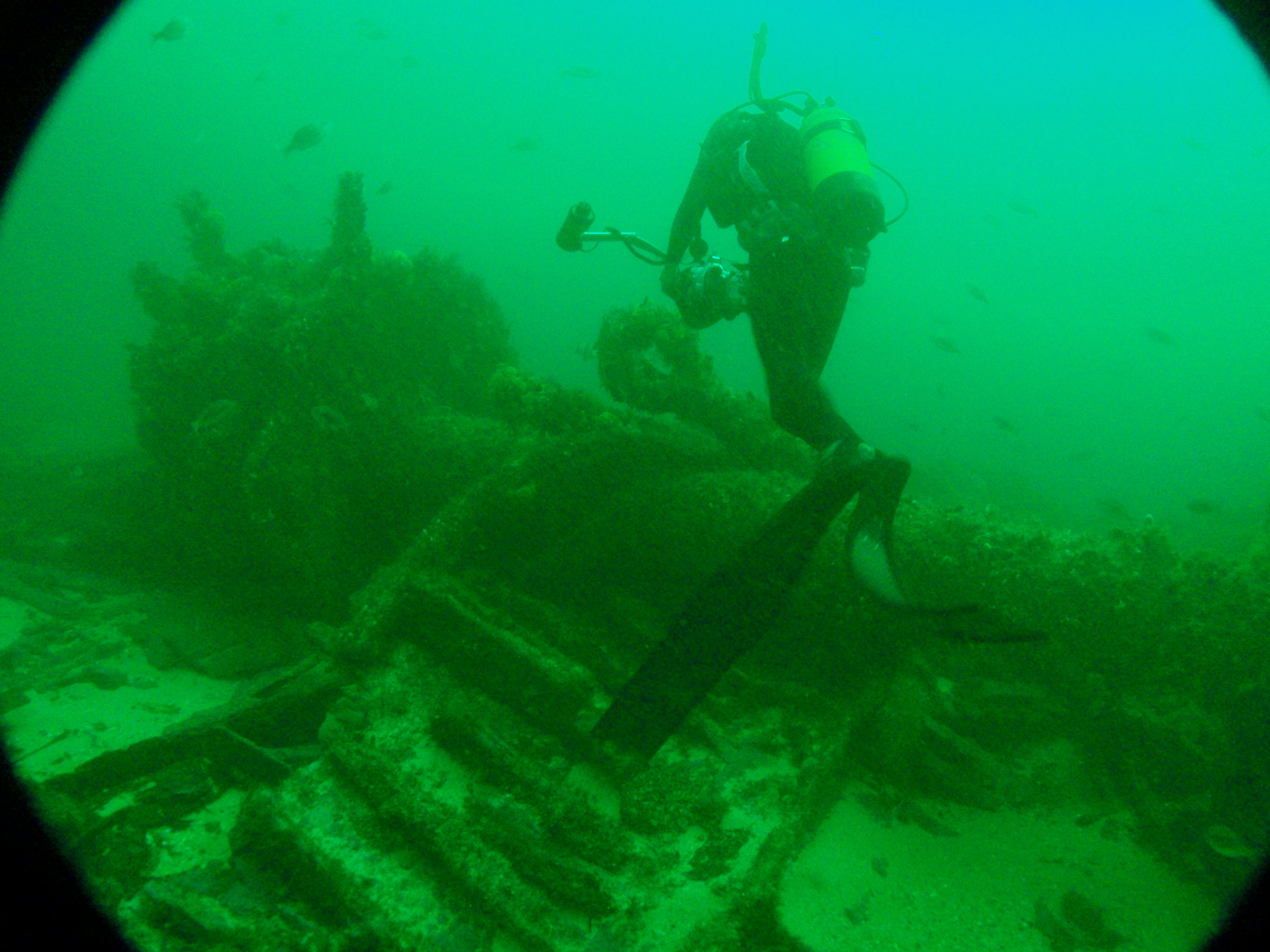
The paddle shaft of the wreck in 2011

There was a rumour that the Birkenhead was carrying a military payroll of £240,000 in gold coins weighing about three tons, which had been secretly stored in the powder-room before the final voyage. Numerous attempts have been made to salvage the gold. In 1893, the nephew of Colonel Seton wrote that a certain Mr. Bandmann at the Cape obtained permission from the Cape Government to dive the wreck of the Birkenhead in search of the treasure. A June 1958 salvage attempt by a renowned Cape Town diver recovered anchors and some brass fittings but no gold. In 1986–1988, a combined archaeological and salvage excavation was carried out by Aqua Exploration, Depth Recovery Unit and Pentow Marine Salvage Company. Only a few gold coins were recovered, which appear to have been the possessions of the passengers and crew.

The rumour of treasure and the shallow depth of the wreck at 30 metres (98 ft) have resulted in the wreck being considerably disturbed, despite its being a war grave. In 1989, the British and South African governments entered into an agreement over the salvage of the wreck, sharing any gold recovered.

=== HMS Birkenhead as namesake ===
Three placenames in the Canadian province of British Columbia were conferred in honour of the Birkenhead disaster by Hudson's Bay Company explorer Alexander Caulfield Anderson, a boyhood friend and cousin of Lt-Col. Seton of the 74th Regiment of Foot, on a traverse of uncharted country between the Fraser Canyon and the coastal Lower Mainland in 1846. Named after his cousin, Seton Lake cuts west through the Coast Mountains from the Fraser Canyon town of Lillooet, beyond which is its twin Anderson Lake.

A few miles southwest from the head of Anderson Lake is Mount Birkenhead, named by Anderson, on the north side of the low pass connecting the valley of those lakes to that of the Birkenhead River. The river, the valley area near Mount Birkenhead known as Birken, and Birkenhead Lake at the summit of the pass were in turn named after the mountain, and not directly by Anderson.

=== Other name legacies ===
According to local tradition, Salmonsdam Nature Reserve in the Overberg region of South Africa is named after Captain Robert Salmond.

In some local accounts, Great white sharks in the region have been referred to colloquially as "Tommy sharks", reportedly in reference to British soldiers (Tommy Atkins) who were said to have been attacked in the area.

== See also ==
- Arniston, a wreck in 1815 on the same coast that also involved the 73rd Regiment of Foot
- SS Tyndareus, a troopship which struck a mine in 1917 and was later compared to the Birkenhead evacuation due to the orderly conduct of troops
- Women and children first, maritime evacuation protocol popularly associated with the Birkenhead
- List of shipwrecks, broader catalogue of maritime losses
