= HMS Birkenhead =

Two ships of the British Royal Navy have been named HMS Birkenhead, after the English town of Birkenhead.

- HMS Birkenhead (1845) was an iron-hulled troopship launched in 1845 and notably wrecked in 1852.
- HMS Birkenhead (1915) was a Town-class light cruiser launched in 1915, in action at Jutland, and sold 1921.
