= Birkenhead Lake Provincial Park =

Provincial park

- IUCN category II (national park)
- Location within British Columbia
- Interactive map of Birkenhead Lake Provincial Park
- Location: British Columbia
- Nearest city: D'Arcy, British Columbia
- Coordinates: 50°34′59″N 122°44′59″W
- Area: 104.39 square kilometres (40.31 sq mi)
- Established: October 10, 1963

Birkenhead Lake
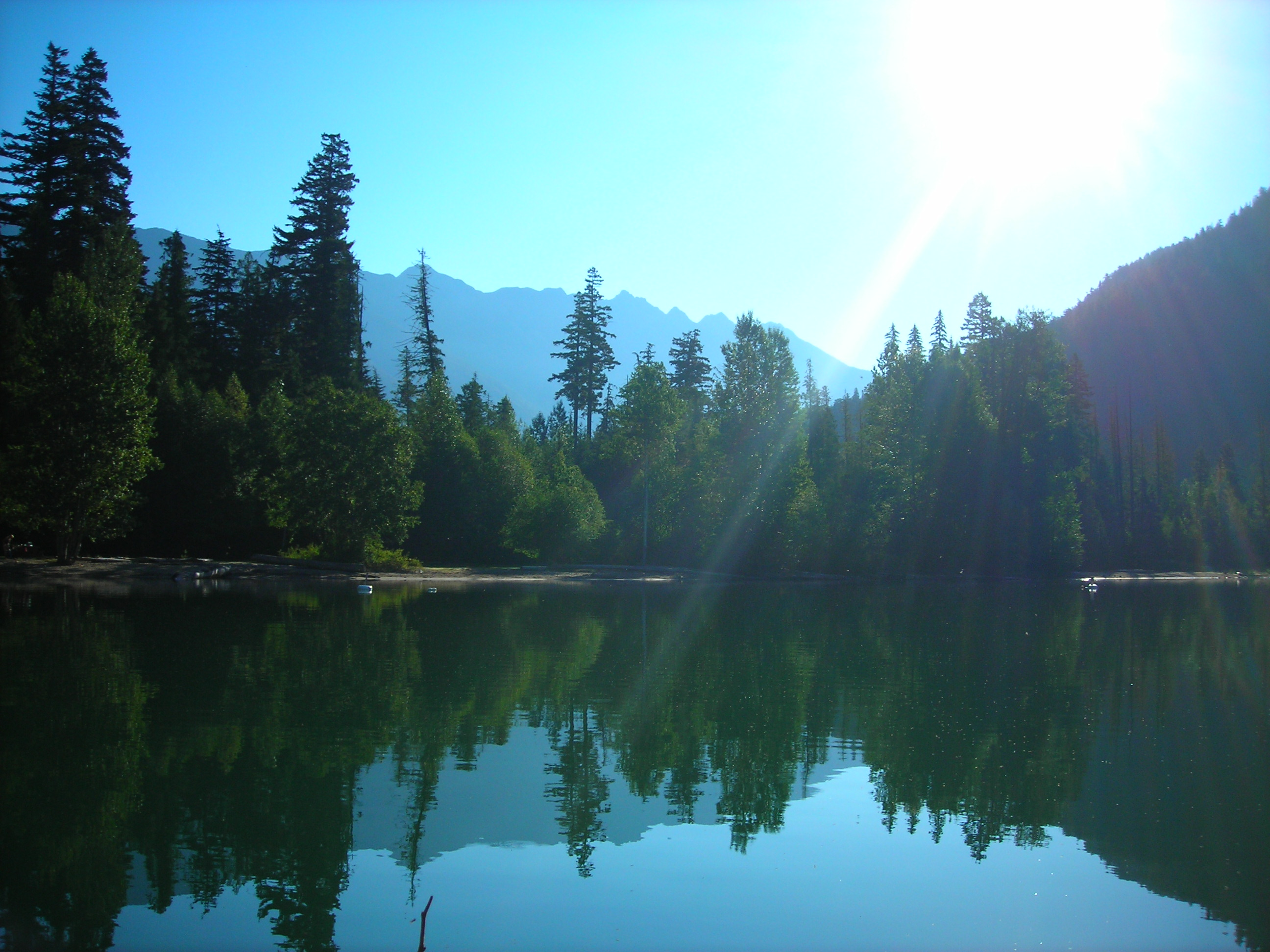
- View of the Birkenhead Lake beach

- Location within British Columbia
- Location: British Columbia
- Coordinates: 50°32′N 122°41′W
- Primary inflows: Phelix Creek, Sockeye Creek
- Primary outflows: Taillefer Creek
- Basin countries: Canada
- Max. length: 6.4 km (4.0 mi)
- Surface area: 4.087 square kilometres (1.578 sq mi)
- Average depth: 21.6 m (71 ft)
- Max. depth: 38.4 m (126 ft)

Birkenhead Lake Provincial Park is a provincial park in British Columbia, Canada, located in the Lillooet Country region. The park lies north of the communities of Squamish, Whistler and Pemberton, and immediately northwest of Birkenhead Peak and Gates Lake (a.k.a. Birken Lake) at the community of Birken.

The park has a size of 104.39 km^{2} (40.31 sq mi), while Birkenhead Lake itself is 4.087 km^{2} (1.578 sq mi).

== History and conservation ==
Birkenhead Provincial Park was established in 1963 to provide a recreation and conservation area between the Pemberton Valley and Lillooet. It was expanded in 1993 and again in 2008 to preserve more of the Sockeye Creek watershed.

The park's wildlife includes mountain goats, moose, snowshoe hare, black bears and grizzly bears, while Birkenhead Lake itself is home to Rainbow Trout and Kokanee. The lakes in the park are also home to a protected species of bull trout, often mistaken for Dolly Varden.

== Location and access ==
The park is located 90 kilometres north-east of Whistler, the last 12 kilometres of which are a non-paved gravel road branching off the main paved between Mount Currie and D'Arcy northeast of the community of Birken. The park has 91 vehicle accessible campsites and a lakeside beach area.
