= Lillooet language =

Salishan language of British Columbia, Canada

Lillooet
- St̓át̓imcets, Sƛ̓aƛ̓imxǝc; Ucwalmícwts, Lil̓wat7úlmec
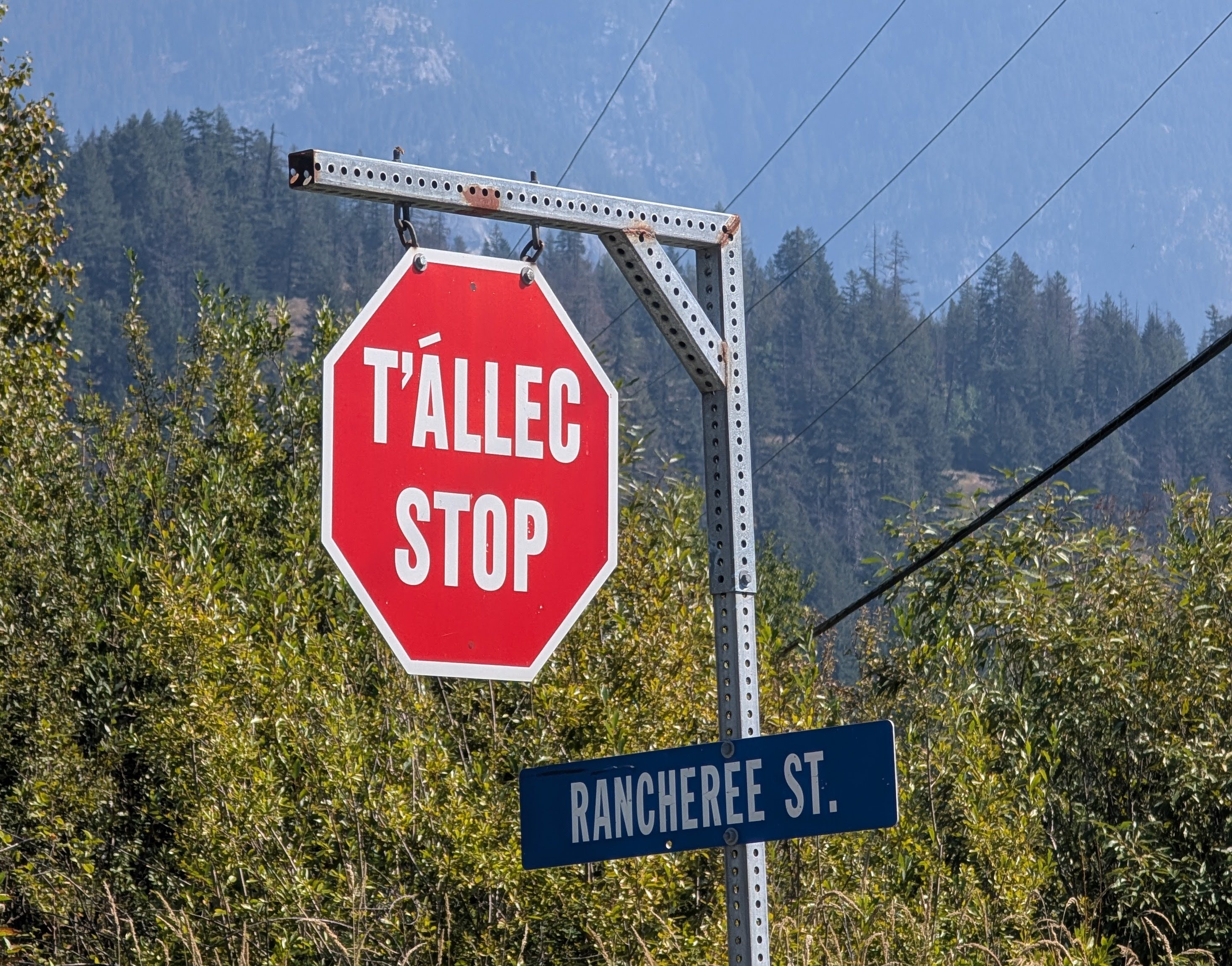
- A stop sign in Lillooet and English
- Pronunciation: [ˈʃt͡ɬʼæt͡ɬʼjəmxət͡ʃ]
- Native to: Canada
- Region: British Columbia
- Ethnicity: 6,670 St̓át̓imc (2014, FPCC)
- Native speakers: 130 (2021 census)
- Language family: Salishan: Interior Salish; Northern; Lillooet
- Dialects: Upper; Lower

Language codes
- ISO 639-3: lil
- Glottolog: lill1248
- ELP: St̓át̓imcets (Lillooet)
- Lillooet is classified as Severely Endangered by the UNESCO Atlas of the World's Languages in Danger.

Lillooet (/ˈlɪloʊɛt/; Lillooet: St̓át̓imcets / Sƛ̓aƛ̓imxǝc, [ˈʃt͡ɬʼæt͡ɬʼjəmxət͡ʃ]), also Lilʼwat, is a Salishan language of the Interior branch spoken by the Stʼatʼimc in southern British Columbia, Canada, around the middle Fraser and Lillooet Rivers. The language of the Lower Lillooet people uses the name Ucwalmícwts, because St̓át̓imcets means "the language of the people of Sat̓", i.e. the Upper Lillooet of the Fraser River.

Lillooet is a critically endangered language with around 120 fluent speakers and 393 semi-speakers. In 2022, there was a reported 1092 people learning the language.

== Regional varieties ==
Lillooet has two main dialects:

- Upper/Northern Lillooet (a.k.a. St̓át̓imcets, Fountain)
- Lower/Southern Lillooet (a.k.a. Lil̓wat7úlmec, Mount Currie)

Upper Lillooet is spoken around Fountain, Pavilion, Lillooet, and neighboring areas. Lower Lillooet is spoken around Mount Currie and neighboring areas. An additional subdialect called "Skookumchuck" is spoken within the Lower Lilooet dialect area, but there is no information available in van Eijk (1981, 1997). A common self-designation used by the bands of the Lower Lillooet River below Lillooet Lake is Ucwalmicwts.

The Clao7alcw ("Raven's Nest") language nest program at Mount Currie, home of the Lil’wat, is conducted in the Lillooet language and was the focus of Onowa McIvor's Master's thesis.

As of 2014, "the Coastal Corridor Consortium—an entity made up of board members from First Nations and educational partners to improve aboriginal access to and performance in postsecondary education and training— ... [has] developed a Lil’wat-language program."

== Phonology ==
=== Consonants ===
Like other languages of the American Northwest language area, including all Salishan languages, Lillooet has a large consonant inventory with extensive phonemic glottalization. Lillooet has 44 consonants distinguished at six places of articulation. Every non-fricative consonant can be glottalized; only the glottalized lateral affricate /t͡ɬʼ/ lacks a plain counterpart, although the glottalized counterpart of /t/ has a sibilant release /t͡sʼ/, and the uvular glottalized consonants are affricated. Lillooet's consonant inventory is unusual in lacking a hissing sibilant fricative /s/, hence ⟨s⟩ is used to represent /ʃ/ in the practical orthography.

Analysis of van Eijk (1997)
			Bilabial	Dental			Postalveolar/ Palatal		Velar		Uvular/ Pharyngeal		Glottal
			Bilabial	median	lateral		plain	retr.	plain	labial	plain	labial	Glottal
			Bilabial	median	plain	retr.	plain	retr.	plain	labial	plain	labial	Glottal
Occlusive	nasal	plain	m	n									
Occlusive	nasal	glottalic	mˀ	nˀ									
Occlusive	oral	tenuis	p	t			t͡ʃ	t͡ʂ	k	kʷ	q	qʷ	
Occlusive	oral	ejective	pʼ	t͡sʼ	t͡ɬʼ				kʼ	kʷʼ	q͡χʼ	q͡χʷʼ	ʔ
Continuant	voiceless				ɬ		ʃ	ʂ	x	xʷ	χ	χʷ	
Continuant	voiced			z	l	ɫ	j		ɣ	w	ʕ	ʕʷ	h
Continuant	glottalic			zˀ	lˀ	ɫˀ	jˀ		ɣˀ	wˀ	ʕˀ	ʕˀʷ	

- Glottalized stops are pronounced as ejective consonants. Glottalized sonorants are pronounced with creaky voice. /nˀ/ = /nʼ/ = [n̰] are all essentially equivalent notation which are often used interchangeably in descriptions of Lillooet.
- The glottalized consonants of Lillooet contrast not only with plain consonants, but also with sequences of consonants and glottal stops. For example, /tisqlawˀa/ "the beaver, the money" (with /wˀ/) contrasts with /tiqʷlawʔa/ "the onion" (with /wʔ/).
- The dental glides /z, zˀ/ are phonetically lax (lenited) fricatives varying between pure dental [z̪᫛, z̪᫛ˀ] and interdental [ð̪̞͆, ð̪̞͆ˀ], depending on the dialect. It is unclear if these sounds are truly dental sibilants, as van Eijk notes the usage of ⟨z⟩ as a simplified transcription, while comparing the dental lax fricative to a fronted English z and the interdental to a lax English voiced th.
- The velar and pharyngeal glides, /ɣ, ɣˀ/ and /ʕ, ʕˀ, ʕʷ, ʕˀʷ/, are phonetically lax, [ɣ᫛, ɣ᫛ˀ] and [ʕ̞, ʕ̞ˀ, ʕ̞ʷ, ʕ̞ˀʷ], like their dental counterparts. Phonologically, van Eijk considers the velar glides /ɣ, ɣˀ/ as "velarized counterparts" of /j, jˀ/, and the pharyngeal glides /ʕ, ʕˀ, ʕʷ, ʕˀʷ/ as "uvularized counterparts" of /h, ʔ, w, wˀ/.
- There are four pairs of "retracted" and nonretracted consonants (which alternate morphophonemically). "Retraction" on consonants is essentially velarization with accompanying tenseness.
  - /t͡ʃ/ – /t͡ʂ/
  - /ʃ/ – /ʂ/
  - /l/ – /ɫ/
  - /lˀ/ – /ɫˀ/

=== Vowels ===
Lillooet has 8 vowels:

Phonemic values
Backness	Front		Central		Back	
Retr. Height	−	+	−	+	−	+
High	/i/	/i̠/			/u/	/u̠/
Mid			/ə/	/ə̠/		
Low			/a/	/a̠/		

Primary phonetic realizations
Backness	Front		Central		Back	
Retr. Height	−	+	−	+	−	+
High	[e̝]	[ɛ]			[o̝]	[ɔ]
Mid			[ə]	[ʌ]		
Low			[ɛ]	[a]		

The primary phonetic realizations of the phonemes are indicated in brackets to the right, though many position-dependent allophones exist; the realization of /i/ ranges from [i~ɛ], that of /u/ from [u~ɔ], that of /a/ from [a~ɛ], and that of /ə/ from [ə~ɪ~ʌ~ɔ̆~ʊ].

=== Phonological processes ===
- Some sequences give rise to an epenthetic /ə/.

Post-velar Harmony (retraction):

- Within roots, all consonant and vowel retracted-nonretracted pairs must be of the same type. That is, a root may not contain both a retracted and a nonretracted vowel or consonant. This is a type of retracted tongue root harmony (also called "pharyngeal harmony") involving both vowels and consonants, an areal feature of this region of North America shared by other Interior Salishan and non-Salishan languages (for example see Chilcotin vowel flattening).
- In addition to the root harmony restriction, some suffixes harmonize with the root to which they are attached. For instance, the inchoative suffix /-wílˀx/ -wil’c:

ama "good"	/ʔáma/	+ /-wílˀx/	→	/ʔamawílˀx/ [ʔɛmɛwélˀx]	amawíl’c "to get better"
qvl "bad"	/qə̠ḻ/	+ /-wílˀx/	→	/qə̠ḻwíḻˀx/ [qaɫwɛ́ɫˀx]	qvḻwíiḻʼc "to get spoiled"

== Orthography ==
There are two practical orthographies, one developed by Randall Bouchard and another developed by Jan van Eijk working with Lorna Williams. Several works also use transcriptions based on Americanist Phonetic Notation. The Bouchard practical orthography was used by the Upper St̓át̓imc communities and the Upper St̓át̓imc Language, Culture and Education Society but they have since also adopted the van Eijk practical orthography that has been used by the Mount Currie School and the Lillooet Council. The van Eijk practical orthography is unusual in that /tɬʼ/ is written ⟨t̓⟩, but it is preferred in many modern Lillooet-speaking communities.

Phoneme		Orthography (van Eijk)
IPA	APA	Orthography (van Eijk)
Vowels
/e/	i	i
/o/	u	u
/ə/	ǝ	e
/ɛ/	a	a
/ɛ/	ị	ii
/ɔ/	ụ	o
/ʌ/	ǝ̣	v
/a/	ạ	ao
Consonants
/p/	p	p
/pʼ/	p’	p̓
/t/	t	t
/tɬʼ/	ƛ’	t̓
/tʃ/	c	ts
/tʃˠ/	c̣	ṯs̱
/tsʼ/	c’	ts̓
/k/	k	k
/kʷ/	kʷ	kw
/kʼ/	k’	k̓
/kʷʼ/	k’ʷ	k̓w
/q/	q	q
/qʷ/	qʷ	qw
/qχʼ/	q’	q̓
/qχʷʼ/	q’ʷ	q̓w
/ʔ/	ʔ	7
/ʃ/	s	s
/ʃ̠/	ṣ	s̠
/x/	x	c
/xʷ/	xʷ	cw
/χ/	x̌	x
/χʷ/	x̌ʷ	xw
/m/	m	m
/mˀ/	m’	m̓
/n/	n	n
/nˀ/	n’	n̓
/ɬ/	ɬ	lh
/z/	z	z
/zˀ/	z’	z̓
/ɰ/	ɣ	r
/w/	w	w
/ɰˀ/	ɣ’	r̓
/wˀ/	w’	w̓
/ʕ/	ʕ	g
/ʕʷ/	ʕʷ	gw
/ʕˀ/	ʕ’	g̓
/ʕʷˀ/	ʕ’ʷ	g̓w
/h/	h	h
/j/	y	y
/jˀ/	y’	y̓
/l/	l	l
/ḻ/	ḷ	ḻ
/lˀ/	l’	l̓
/ḻˀ/	ḷ’	l̠̓

== Grammar ==
Lillooet has two main types of words:

1. full words
  1. variable words
  2. invariable words
2. clitics
  1. proclitics
  2. enclitics

The variable word type may be affected by many morphological processes, such as prefixation, suffixation, infixation, reduplication, and glottalization.

Lillooet, like the other Salishan languages, exhibits predicate/argument flexibility. All full words are able to occur in the predicate (including words with typically noun-like meanings such as nk̓yap 'coyote', which in the predicate essentially means 'to be a coyote') and any full word is able to appear in an argument, even those that seem verb-like, such as t̓ak 'go along', which as an independent argument is equivalent to 'one that goes along'.

Sentence	T̓ak ti nk̓yápa.			
Morphemes	t̓ak	ti-	nk̓yap	-a
Gloss	go.along	DET-	coyote	-DET
Parts	Predicate	Subject		
Translation	The/a coyote goes along.			
Sentence	Nḱyáp ti t̓aka.			
Morphemes	nk̓yap	ti-	t̓ak	-a
Gloss	coyote	DET-	go.along	-DET
Parts	Predicate	Subject		
Translation	The one going along is a coyote.			

=== Reduplication ===
Lillooet, as is typical of the Salishan family, has several types of reduplication (and triplication) that have a range of functions such as expressing plural, diminutive, aspect, etc.

Initial reduplication:
kl̓ácw	'muskrat'	→	kl̓ekl̓ácw	'muskrats'	Plural
stálhlec	'standing up'	→	státalhlec	'keep standing up'	Continuative	(s- prefix, stem: -tálhlec)
sráp	'tree'	→	srepráp	'trees'	Collective/Plural	(stem: -rap)
snúk̓wa7	'friend/relative'	→	snek̓wnúk̓wa7	'friends/relatives'	Collective/Plural	(stem: -núk̓wa7)
Final reduplication/triplication:
p̓líxw	'boil over'	→	p̓líxwexw	'boiling over'	Ongoing Action
p̓líxw	'boil over'	→	p̓lixwixwíxw	'keep boiling over'	Continuative/Intensive
lhésp	'rash'	→	lhéslhsep	'rash all over'	Collective/Plural	(stem: lhes- with epenthetic e)

A more complicated type of reduplication is the internal reduplication used to express the diminutive. In this case the consonant before a stressed vowel is reduplicated after the stressed vowel and usually the vowel then changes to e (IPA: [ə]). Examples are below:

Internal reduplication:
naxwít	'snake'	→	naxwéxwt	'worm'	(naxwé-xw-t)
sqáxa7	'dog'	→	sqéqxa7	'pup'	(sqé-q-xa7)
sqláw̓	'beaver'	→	sqlélew̓	'little beaver'	(sqlé-l-ew̓)	epenthetic e

More than one reduplicative process can occur in a given word:

		Diminutive		Plural+Diminutive
sqáxa7	'dog'	sqéqxa7	'pup'	sqexqéqxa7	'pups'
s-qáxa7	'dog'	s-qé-q-xa7	'pup'	s-qex-qé-q-xa7	'pups'

Lillooet has several other variants of the above types. Reduplication is further complicated by consonant glottalization (see van Eijk (1997) for details).

=== Mood and modality ===
The subjunctive mood appears in nine distinct environments, with a range of semantic effects, including:

- weakening an imperative to a polite request,
- turning a question into an uncertainty statement,
- creating an ignorance free relative.

Unlike Indo-European equivalents, the Lillooet subjunctive is not selected by attitude verbs.

Lillooet has a complex system of subject and object agreement. There are different subject agreement paradigms for transitive vs. intransitive predicates. For intransitive predicates, there are three distinct subject paradigms, one of which is glossed as 'subjunctive' by van Eijk (1997) and Davis (2006)

== Sample text ==
The following is a portion of a story in van Eijk (1981:87) told by Rosie Joseph of Mount Currie.

Lillooet:

Nilh aylh lts7a sMáma ti húz̓a qweqwl̓el̓tmínan. N̓as ku7 ámlec áku7 tsípunsa. Nilh t̓u7 st̓áksas ti xláka7sa. Tsicw áku7, nilh t̓u7 ses wa7, kwánas et7ú i sqáwtsa. Wa7 ku7 t̓u7 áti7 xílem, t̓ak ku7 knáti7 ti pú7y̓acwa. Nilh ku7 t̓u7 skwánas, lip̓in̓ás ku7. Nilh ku7 t̓u7 aylh stsuts: "Wa7 nalh aylh láti7 kapv́ta!" Nilh ku7 t̓u7 aylh sklhaka7mínas ku7 láti7 ti sqáwtsa cwilhá k̓a, nao7q̓ spawts ti kwanensása...

English translation:

This time it is Máma I am going to talk about. She went that way to get some food from her roothouse. So she took along her bucket. She got there, and she stayed around, taking potatoes. She was doing that, and then a mouse ran by there. So she grabbed it, she squeezed it. So she said: "You get all squashed now!" So she opened her hand and she let go of what turned out to be a potato, it was a rotten potato that she had caught...

== Bibliography ==
- Frank, Beverley, Rose Whitley, and Jan van Eijk. Nqwaluttenlhkalha English to Statimcets Dictionary. Volume One. 2002. ISBN 1-896719-18-X
- Joseph, Marie. (1979). Cuystwí malh Ucwalmícwts: Ucwalmícwts curriculum for beginners. Mount Currie, B.C.: Ts’zil Publishing House. ISBN 0-920938-00-0.
- Larochell, Martina; van Eijk, Jan P.; & Williams, Lorna. (1981). Cuystwí malh Ucwalmícwts: Lillooet legends and stories. Mount Currie, B.C.: Ts’zil Publishing House. ISBN 0-920938-03-5.
- Lillooet Tribal Council. (1993). Introducing St'at'imcets (Fraser River Dialect): A primer. Lillooet, British Columbia: Lillooet Tribal Council.
- Matthewson, Lisa, and Beverley Frank. When I was small = I wan kwikws : a grammatical analysis of St'át'imc oral narratives. First nations languages. Vancouver: UBC Press, 2005. ISBN 0-7748-1090-4
- Poser, William J. (2003). The status of documentation for British Columbia native languages. Yinka Dene Language Institute Technical Report (No. 2). Vanderhoof, British Columbia: Yinka Dene Language Institute. (2003 updated version).
- van Eijk, Jan P. (1981). Cuystwí malh Ucwalmícwts: Teach yourself Lillooet: Ucwalmícwts curriculum for advanced learners. Mount Currie, B.C.: Ts’zil Publishing House. ISBN 0-920938-02-7.
- van Eijk, Jan P. (1985). The Lillooet language: Phonology, morphology, syntax. Amsterdam: Universiteit van Amsterdam.
- van Eijk, Jan P. (1988). Lillooet forms for 'pretending' and 'acting like'. International Journal of Linguistics, 54, 106–110.
- van Eijk, Jan P. (1990). Intransitivity, transitivity and control in Lillooet Salish. In H. Pinkster & I. Grenee (Eds.), Unity in diversity: Papers presented to Simon C. Dik on his 50th birthday (pp. 47–64). Dordrecht, Holland: Foris.
- van Eijk, Jan P. (1993). CVC reduplication and infixation in Lillooet. In A. Mattina & T. Montler (Eds.), American Indian linguistics and ethnography in honor of Laurence C. Thompson (pp. 317–326). University of Montana occasional papers in linguistics (No. 10). Missoula: University of Montana.
- van Eijk, Jan P. (1997). The Lillooet language: Phonology, morphology, syntax. Vancouver: UBC Press. ISBN 0-7748-0625-7. (Revised version of van Eijk 1985).
- Williams, Lorna; van Eijk, Jan P.; & Turner, Gordon. (1979). Cuystwí malh Ucwalmícwts: Ucwalmícwts curriculum for intermediates. Mount Currie, B.C.: Ts’zil Publishing House. ISBN 0-920938-01-9.
