= Birken, British Columbia =

Birken
- Location of Birken in British Columbia
- Coordinates: 50°28′59″N 122°37′04″W
- Country: Canada
- Province: British Columbia
- Region: Lillooet Country
- Regional District: Squamish-Lillooet
- Time zone: UTC−07:00 (PT)
- Postal code: V0N 2L0
- Area code: 604

Birken is an unincorporated community on the north shore of Gates Lake in the Squamish-Lillooet region of southwestern British Columbia. On Pemberton Portage Road, the locality is by road about 182 kilometres (113 mi) north of Vancouver and 62 kilometres (39 mi) northeast of Whistler.

== Name origin ==
The Birkenhead River and the former name of the lake gave the community name.

== Trails and roads ==
The 47-kilometre (29 mi) Pemberton Portage was that part of the Douglas Road between Lillooet Lake and Anderson Lake during the Fraser Canyon Gold Rush. By late 1858, this rough trail was completed. About midway on this section, Peter Dickenson built Halfway House in 1859. On the mountainside, the venue looked over an expanse of vegetable crops during the next year. By the 1870s, Thomas Poole owned and ran the property, situated about 4 kilometres (2 mi) southwest of later Birken. Ronald Currie and Annie McIntosh, step-siblings of John Currie of Pemberton, bought the property around 1900, but the house burned to the ground about 1910. Ronald also operated a stage on the route until 1913. In the 1960s, the old dirt road to Birken and D'Arcy was widened and some of the hills eliminated. About 2000, the road was paved as far as D'Arcy.

== Railway ==
The northward advance of the Pacific Great Eastern Railway (PGE) rail head passed in early December 1914.

The train station was 15.1 kilometres (9.4 mi) northeast of Spetch and 6.6 kilometres (4.1 mi) southwest of Gates.

In 2017, a freight train carrying lumber, which derailed nearby, sent five cars into the lake. The next year, several cars carrying wood pulp derailed. One was almost submerged, one was entering the water, and one was precariously resting on the bank.

== Early Birken community ==
In 1907, Samuel Spetch opened a store. In June 1908, he became the first postmaster, but that August relocated the store/post office to Owl Creek. The Birken post office reopened in 1920 and permanently closed in 1970.

In 1922, M.B Pullinger was the inaugural teacher when the Birken school opened. Having closed and reopened a few times, the final closure was in 1944.

In 1929, Samuel Spetch returned from Owl Creek to open a store.

The population was about 40 by 1934, 50 by 1938, 38 by 1943, and 46 by 1947.

== Mile 72 ==
About 7.6 kilometres (4.7 mi) to the southwest, an access point for miners into Tenquille Creek was at Mile 72. From the 1920s, cabins were built at this location.

== Later Birken community ==
In a semi-forested area at the base of steep slopes, the population of about 250 has no cellphone reception. Floods and landslides present the greatest hazards. A volunteer fire department exists.

The nearby 1.27-hectare (3.1-acre) Gates Lake Community Park was established in 2013. The Birken Lakeside Resort is an historic lakeside property. The Birken House Bakery and Bed and Breakfast offers traditional breads and lodgings.

Annual events are the Gates Lake Shinny Tournament held in February and the Birken 4X4 OffRoad Rally in June. The Birken Country Market is held monthly during the summer.
