= Lillooet Land District =

Land district in British Columbia, Canada

Coordinates: 51°10′00″N 122°30′00″W

Lillooet Land District is one of the 59 cadastral subdivisions of British Columbia, which were created by the Lands Act of the Colony of British Columbia in 1859, defined as "a territorial division with legally defined boundaries for administrative purposes". The land district's boundaries came to be used as the boundary of the initial Lillooet riding for the provincial Legislature from 1871, when the colony became a province. In addition to use in descriptions of land titles and lot surveys, the Land District was also the basis of the Lillooet Mining District.

Included in the Land District are the historical region known as the Lillooet Country, including the Pemberton Valley, and the southeast Chilcotin and South Cariboo areas. Major landforms in the land district include the Pemberton Icecap and the Lillooet Icecap.

Municipalities within the land district are Pemberton, Lillooet, 100 Mile House and Clinton. Other communities include D'Arcy, Shalalth, Seton Portage, Fountain, Pavilion, Gold Bridge, Bralorne, Jesmond, and 70 Mile House.

To the south, Lillooet Land District borders with New Westminster Land District, on the west with Sayward Land District and Range 1 Coast Land District, on the north with Cariboo Land District, and on the east and southeast, Kamloops Division Yale Land District.

== Description ==
Starting at a point just north of the head of Jervis Inlet, at 50 degrees 13 minutes north latitude, 124 degrees west longitude, north to 52 degrees north latitude, 124 degrees west longitude, then, with some small deviances south around parcels of land that are part of Cariboo Land District east along the 52nd parallel north to approximately 120 degrees, 33 minutes west longitude, crossing BC Hwy 97 at the Begbie Summit. From there, south along that longitude, passing between Canim Lake and Mahood Lake, bisecting Bonaparte Lake, to 51 degrees 2 minutes north latitude, just northwest of Silwhoiakun Mountain, then west to 51 degrees 4 minutes latitude, between Loon Lake and Hihium Lake, with deviances north and south around parcels of land. From there, the boundary follows land parcel boundaries in a jagged curving line to 50 degrees 45 minutes north latitude at 121 degrees 46 west longitude, just northwest of the summit of Chipuin Mountain, to 50 degrees 34 121 degrees 45 west. From there, via another jagged arc around land to cross the Fraser in the area of Fountainview Farm and Foster Bar to 50 degrees 31 minutes north latitude at 121 degrees 48 minutes west longitude. From that point the boundary follows the divide between the Cayoosh Creek and Stein River basins, and that between the Stein basin and that of the Lillooet River, to a point at the western end of the icefields on the Mount Skook Jim massif at 50 degrees 7 minutes north, 122 degrees 15 minutes west, then west, crossing the Lillooet River drainage between Lillooet Lake and Little Lillooet Lake to 50 degrees 7 minutes north, 122 38 degrees west, and following the mountain ridges to 50 degrees 14 minutes north at 122 degrees 45 minutes west, just southwest of the summit of Mount Currie. West along that latitude, the boundary deviates south slightly in the area of the Soo Valley such that surveys in that area are in Lillooet Land District, and then continues west to the point just north of the head of Jervis Inlet.
