= Lillooet Lake =

Lake in British Columbia, Canada

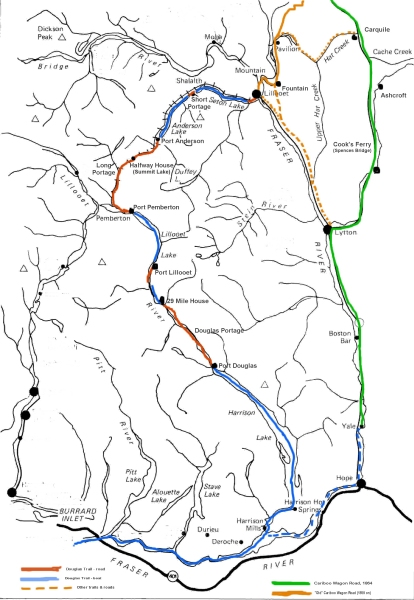
- Lillooet Lake's position on the route of the Douglas Road (water portions in blue, land portions in red) and the Cariboo Road (green)

- Location within British Columbia
- Location: British Columbia
- Coordinates: 50°15′N 122°30′W
- Basin countries: Canada
- Max. length: 25 km (16 mi)
- Surface area: 21 km^{2} (8.1 sq mi)
- Max. depth: 137 m (449 ft)

Lillooet Lake is a lake in British Columbia, Canada about 25 km in length and about 21 km^{2} (8.1 sq mi) in area. It is about 95 km downstream from the source of the Lillooet River, which resumes its course after leaving Little Lillooet Lake, aka Tenas Lake (tenass in the Chinook Jargon means little). Immediately adjacent to the mouth of the upper Lillooet River is the mouth of the Birkenhead River and just upstream along the Lillooet is the confluence of the Green River, which begins at Green Lake in the resort area of Whistler.

The community of Pemberton is about 12 km upstream from the head of Lillooet Lake, while the eastern edge of the Mount Currie Indian Reserve of the Lil'wat branch of the St'at'imc people is the lakeshore itself. The eastern ramparts of the mountain ranges of Garibaldi Provincial Park overlook Lillooet Lake from the west, while to the east are the northern reaches of the Lillooet Ranges which lie between the Lillooet-Harrison drainage and the Fraser River.

Lillooet Lake was part of the "Lakes Route" or Douglas Road, once if only briefly the principal route between the Coast and the Interior during the days of the Fraser Canyon Gold Rush. Several steamers and innumerable smaller watercraft served the busy freight and passenger traffic in those days. The best-known and largest of these was the SS Prince of Wales, whose wreckage was visible on the shores of the lake near Mount Currie for many years.

== See also ==
- List of lakes of British Columbia
