= Birkenhead River =

Watercourse in British Columbia, Canada

Coordinates: 50°19′N 122°36′W

The Birkenhead River, formerly known as the Portage River, the Pole River and the Mosquito River, is a major tributary of the Lillooet River, which via Harrison Lake and the Harrison River is one of the major tributaries of the lower Fraser River. It is just over 50 km long from its upper reaches in the unnamed ranges south of Bralorne, British Columbia (these ranges are sometimes called the Noel Ranges or the Birkenhead Ranges); their western area towards the named Bendor Range east of Bralorne is sometimes called the Cadwallader Ranges.

== The river, its resources and its people ==
Originally known as the Pole River, the lower Birkenhead's valley is part of the Long Portage of the Douglas Road, also known as the Pemberton Portage. The height of land on this route has been variously called Pemberton Pass (officially), Birken Pass, Gates Pass, and (in gold rush times) Mosquito Pass. The river is a major salmon resource for the Lil'wat subgroup of the St'at'imc people, whose reserve community Mount Currie which spans the lowland between the very lowest reaches of the Lillooet and Birkenhead Rivers.

=== Owl Creek ===
At Owl Creek, a few miles up the Birkenhead, there was one of the major missions of the Oblate missionary organization, to which Lil'wat people from up and down the Pemberton Valley (Lillooet River valley above Lillooet Lake) moved, ultimately to become the Mount Currie community. Owl Creek is now a large non-native subdivision on the west side of the local highway from Mount Currie to N'quatqua (D'Arcy).

== Gates River ==
Just under 25 km up from its mouth, the main Gates Valley branches east off the north-aligned Birkenhead River's valley via Poole Creek, which drains the westward side of the Pemberton Pass; Birken Lake at its summit is part of the Gates River system which drains towards Anderson Lake and Lillooet. In this area there is a large stone with a foot-shaped impression on it - still there to this day and witnessed by Alexander Caulfield Anderson on his journey through the area in 1846 - where it is said one of the transformers stamped his foot in the rock to make a boundary between the people of the Canyon and those of the Lillooet River valley, who had converged on the spot bearing salmon (from the canyon) and spatsum (weaving reed-grass, from the Lillooet River). Its location is unmarked and as it is on private land it is not available for viewing.

== Birkenhead Lake ==
Birkenhead Lake feeds the Birkenhead River from its south end and connects with a side-valley on its north end. This side valley pass back to the Gates Valley via Blackwater Creek (in historical records sometimes called the Blackwater River). Birkenhead Lake is protected by a small provincial park, although none of the peaks overlooking the lake are protected. Above that the Birkenhead's upper valley is framed by the range which overlooks the Pemberton Valley on the west, and by the mountains of upper Noel Creek south of Bralorne.

== Future of river course ==
Due to siltation much of the land in the eastern part of the reserve, which lies between the two rivers, is new-made since the period of the gold rush and in time it is likely the Birkenhead will be directly a tributary of the Lillooet River, instead of emptying as it does now into Lillooet Lake independently, a few hundred yards northeast of the mouth of the Lillooet River (originally this also would have been the case with the Green River, which is nearer Pemberton, a few miles west and upstream.

== Naming ==
The story of HMS Birkenhead is famous in British Naval history for the fact that women and children aboard were saved when she sank in February 1852 because they boarded the few lifeboats first. While the boats rowed away, the soldiers stood in their ranks on deck. The commanding officer, who perished, was Lieutenant Colonel Alexander Seton who was related to HBC officer A.C. Anderson who named the lake and river after Seton.

== See also ==
- HMS Birkenhead
- List of rivers of British Columbia
