= Lillooet River =

Location
- Country: Canada
- Province: British Columbia
- Districts: Lillooet Land District; New Westminster Land District

Physical characteristics
- Source: Silt Lake
  - location: Coast Mountains
  - coordinates: 50°43′51″N 123°41′25″W
  - elevation: 784 m (2,572 ft)
- Mouth: Harrison Lake
  - coordinates: 49°44′50″N 122°8′44″W
  - elevation: 9 m (30 ft)
- Length: 209 km (130 mi)
- Discharge
  - location: near Pemberton
  - average: 125 m^{3}/s (4,400 cu ft/s)
  - minimum: 6.37 m^{3}/s (225 cu ft/s)
  - maximum: 1,370 m^{3}/s (48,000 cu ft/s)

Basin features
- Tributaries
  - left: Birkenhead River
  - right: Ryan River, Green River

The Lillooet River is a major river of the southern Coast Mountains of British Columbia. It begins at Silt Lake, on the southern edge of the Lillooet Crown Icecap about 80 kilometres northwest of Pemberton and about 85 kilometres northwest of Whistler. Its upper valley is about 95 kilometres in length, entering Lillooet Lake about 15 km downstream from Pemberton on the eastern outskirts of the Mount Currie reserve of the Lil'wat branch of the St'at'imc people. From Pemberton Meadows, about 40 km upstream from Pemberton, to Lillooet Lake, the flat bottomlands of the river form the Pemberton Valley farming region.

Below the 30 km (18.6 mi) length of Lillooet Lake, it resumes again just north of the native community of Skatin (previously known by the settler name of Skookumchuck), home of the Lower St'at'imcets Skatin First Nation. The lower stretch of the Lillooet River, from Lillooet Lake to Harrison Lake, is approximately 55 km (c. 34 mi) in length. Its main tributaries are Meager Creek, the Ryan River, the Green River, and the Birkenhead River. Below Harrison Lake, the stream is renamed as the Harrison River, which enters the Fraser near the First Nations community of Chehalis.

The lower Lillooet River and Lillooet Lake were part of a short-lived main route between the Coast and the Interior in the days of the Fraser Canyon Gold Rush. See the Douglas Road.

== The "other" Lillooet River ==
Until the 1910s, the name Lillooet River also applied to what is now the Alouette River in Maple Ridge; the neighbourhood that grew up on its south branch became known as South Lillooet, but to avoid confusion the new postmaster was requested to come up with a name, choosing Yennadon after his family manor on the Devonshire Moors. The river name was changed formally on March 31, 1915 with "Alouette" chosen because of its resemblance to the sound of "Lillooet".

== Geology ==
The Lillooet River was dammed with breccia from a Plinian style eruption of the Mount Meager massif 2,400 years ago. The breccia damming the Lillooet River was not very strong, and the water soon eroded the breccia that was damming the river, forming Keyhole Falls. There was a massive flood when the water first broke through the breccia. The flood was big enough that small house sized blocks of breccia were carried away during the flood.

== See also ==
- List of rivers of British Columbia
- List of tributaries of the Fraser River
- Upper Lillooet Provincial Park
