= Alexander Caulfield Anderson =

Canadian explorer (1814–1884)

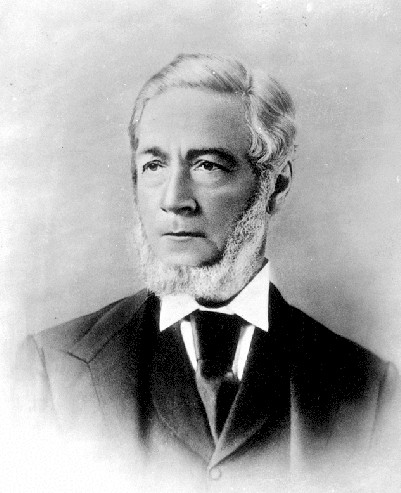
- Anderson c. 1880
- Born: 10 March 1814; Calcutta, British India
- Died: 8 May 1884 (aged 70)
- Occupations: Trader; explorer; civil servant
- Spouse: Eliza Birnie (m. 1837)
- Children: 13

Alexander Caulfield Anderson (10 March 1814 – 8 May 1884) was a British Hudson's Bay Company (HBC) fur-trader, explorer of British Columbia and civil servant.

Anderson joined HBC in 1831 and emigrated to Canada from Europe. He was placed in leadership roles of various forts in British Columbia, including the founding of outposts. In the late 1840s he explored various route possibilities for HBC to connect interior forts with the Pacific Ocean. He retired in 1854, but moved to Victoria, British Columbia, to work as a civil servant. In 1876 he was appointed as dominion inspector of fisheries and proposed building British Columbia's first hatchery.

In 1882, he was stranded on a sand bank for one night, causing his health to deteriorate. He died two years later. Various geographical locations in British Columbia and Washington state are named for him.

== Early life ==
Anderson was born near Calcutta, India. His father was Robert Anderson and his mother was Eliza Charlotte Simpson. The Anderson family moved to Essex, England, in 1817.

In March 1831 Anderson and his brother joined the Hudson's Bay Company and emigrated to Canada. He worked for a year in Lachine, Lower Canada, then moved to Fort Vancouver, on the lower Columbia River. In 1833, he was the second-in-command of the group of people who built Fort McLoughlin, then part of the group tasked by HBC to build a new trading post along the Stikine River, but this was blocked by the Russians.

== Leadership in HBC ==
Anderson was transferred to the New Caledonia department within HBC, which administered the north-central part of British Columbia, and remained there for five years. On his first assignment, an early onset of winter caused him and his party to retreat to Jasper, and a lack of supplies caused them to retreat again to Edmonton. An investigation cleared him of mismanagement of this situation.

In 1836 he was put in charge of the post along the Fraser River, and remained there for three years. He then transferred to Fort George and remained there for a year, then was temporarily in charge of Fort Nisqually. In 1841, he was the first person of European descent to widen and use the Naches Pass. In 1842 he was put in charge of the annual brigade to York Factory. He was then appointed to Fort Alexandria and remained there until 1848.

== Expedition leader ==
After the Oregon Treaty, the border between the United States and British North America was established along the 49th parallel. HBC had used the Columbia River to travel between their interior posts and the Pacific Ocean by going to Fort Vancouver, but under the treaty this route would be partly within the United States. HBC tasked Anderson with finding another route that connected the interior to the ocean, and choose Fort Langley as the location connected to the ocean, and the Fraser River as the route.

Peter Skene Ogden, the person in charge of New Caledonia for the HBC, suggested that Anderson try a route that went south of the canyons of the Fraser, but after completing this route determined that the nine-day route was not suitable. He followed a route through the Cascade Mountains, and determined that the route was more practical but snow might make it inoperable for several months of the year. HBC leadership asked Anderson to find a better route, and Anderson mapped a route in 1847 along Coldwater River and Uztlius Creek. This trail was determined to be too difficult, and Anderson's route through the Cascade Mountains, with slight variations, was used from 1848 to 1860.

== Retirement and government appointments ==
Anderson was placed in command of Fort Colvile in 1848 and remained there until 1851. He was placed second-in-command of Fort Vancouver. He retired in 1854 and settled in Cathlamet.

In 1858 he travelled north to investigate a gold rush. James Douglas met with Anderson in Victoria and convinced him to accept a government appointment in the city. Anderson became postmaster of the city and collector of customs in British Columbia. The earliest records of Anderson's observations of fish species in British Columbia are written in 1860. He also described aboriginal fishing techniques. In 1867 he proposed for salmon eggs to be brought to various tributaries of the Mackenzie River and Saskatchewan River to provide food for future settlers. In 1871 he wrote an essay entitled The dominion at the west; a brief description of the province of British Columbia, which won a provincial prize.

In 1876 he was appointed as British Columbia's first dominion inspector of fisheries, in charge of British Columbia's coastal and inland waters. He remained in this position until his death. He was also appointed to a joint commission on Indian land in British Columbia, but became frustrated with the assignment and his appointment ended in 1878. He wrote a partly-autobiographical manuscript called "History of the northwest coast" which was given to Hubert Howe Bancroft. In 1877 he proposed building British Columbia's first salmon hatchery. Construction on this hatchery began in 1884.

== Personal life, death and legacy ==
Anderson married Eliza Birnie in August 1837. They had 13 children.

In 1882, he was forced to spend a night on a sand bar while travelling and his health deteriorated from the event. He died on 8 May 1884, at the age of 70.

Geographical locations named for Anderson include Anderson Lake, Anderson River and Anderson Island.
