= Lilʼwat First Nation =

First Nation band government

- Band No. 557
- People: Stʼatʼimc
- Headquarters: Mount Currie
- Province: British Columbia

Land
- Other reserves: List (10): Challetkohum 5; Challetkohum 9; Lokla 4; Mount Currie 1; Mount Currie 10; Mount Currie 6; Mount Currie 7; Mount Currie 8; Nesuch 3
- Land area: 27 km^{2} (10 sq mi)

Population (2022)
- On reserve: 1483
- On other land: 88
- Off reserve: 687
- Total population: 2258

Government
- Chief: Ashley Joseph

Tribal Council
- Lower Stlʼatlʼimx Tribal Council

Website
- https://lilwat.ca/

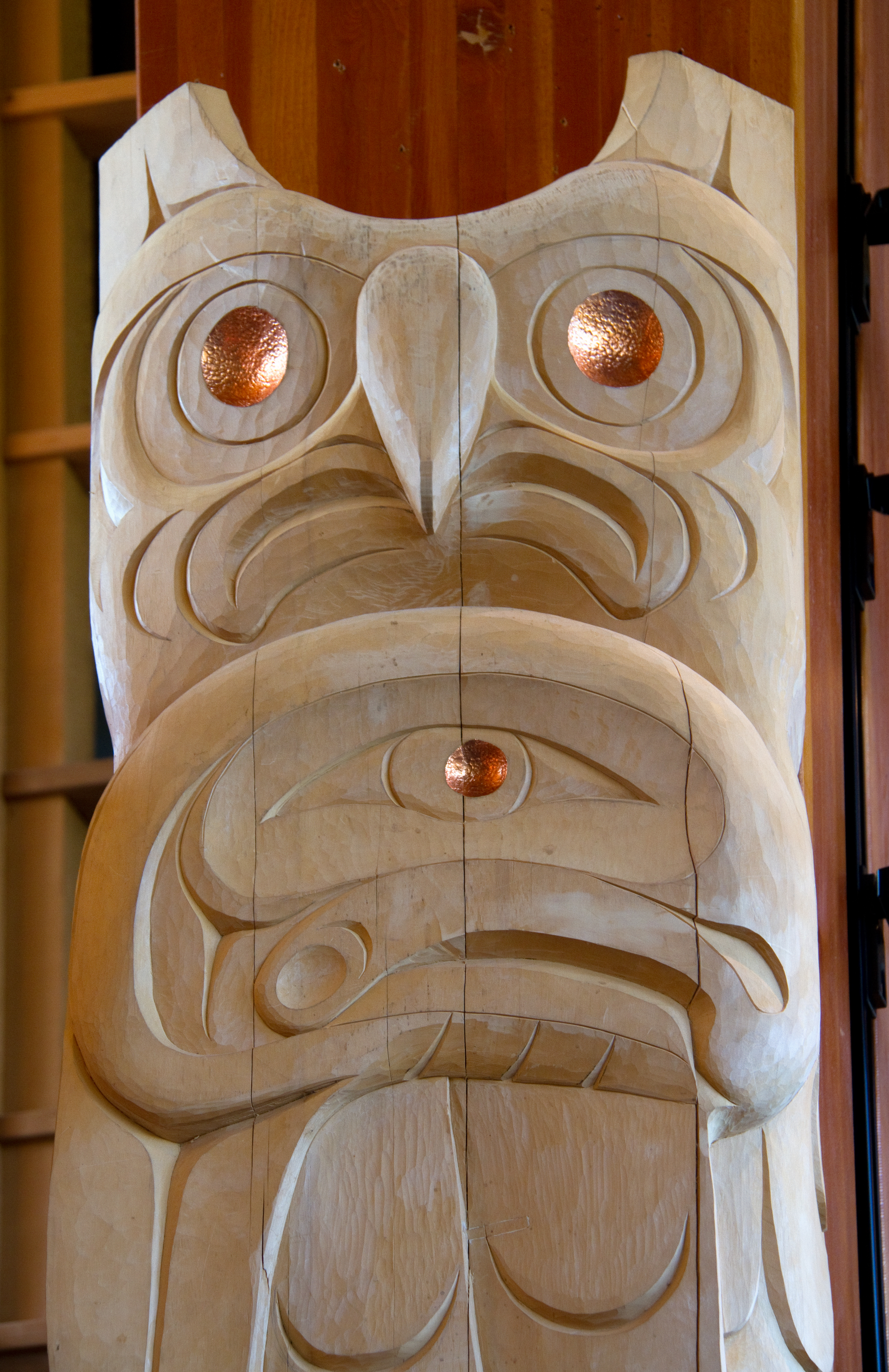
Squamish Lilwat Carving at the Squamish Lilʼwat Cultural Centre

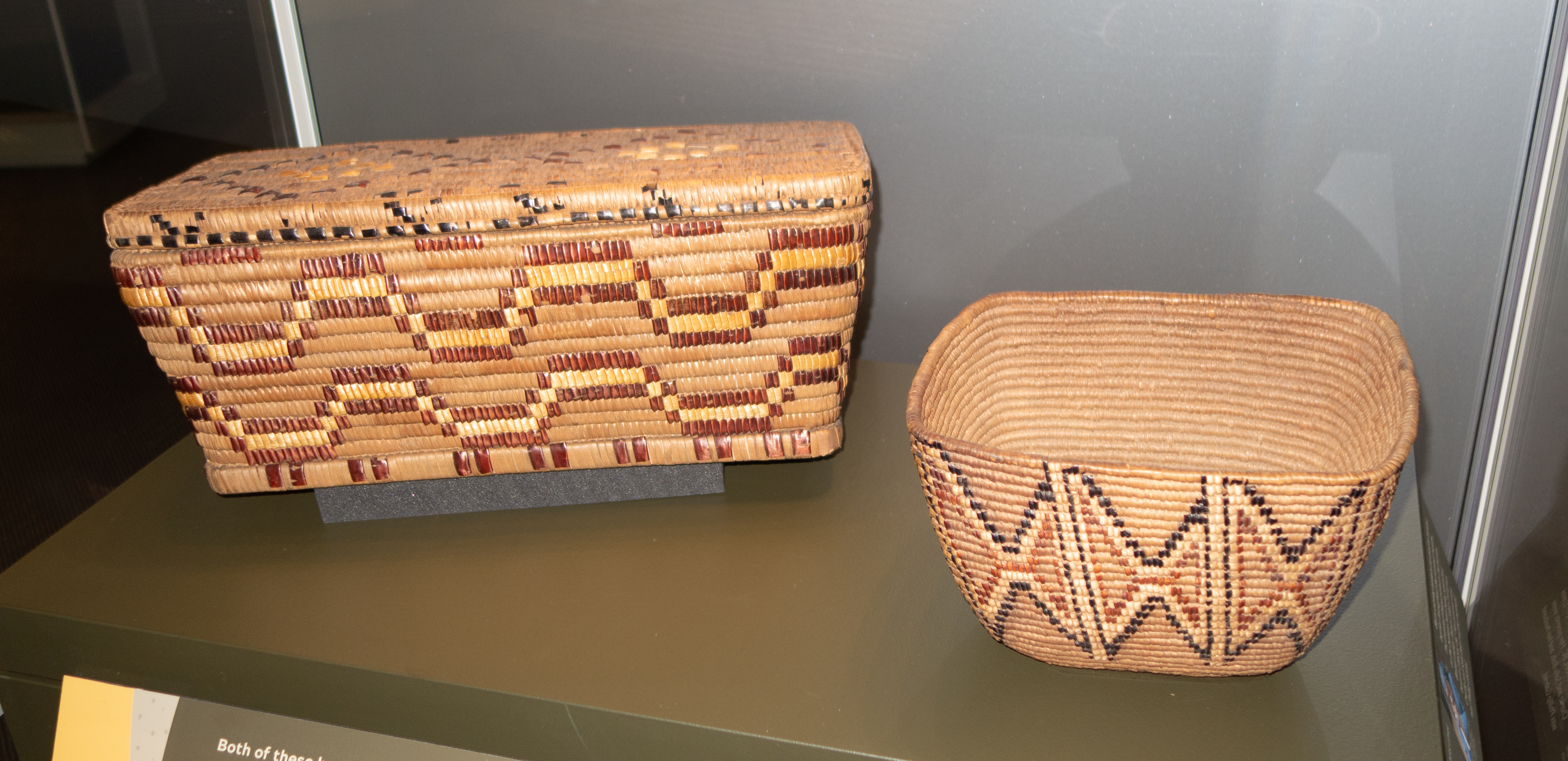
Lilʼwat baskets at the UBC Museum of Anthropology

The Lilʼwat First Nation (Lillooet: Líl̓watǝmx), a.k.a. the Lilʼwat Nation or the Mount Currie Indian Band, is a First Nation band government located in the southern Coast Mountains region of the Interior of the Canadian province of British Columbia. It is a member of the Lower Stlʼatlʼimx Tribal Council, a grouping of band governments of the Stʼatʼimc or Stlʼatlʼimx people (a.k.a. the Lillooet people). Other Stʼatʼimc governments include the larger Lillooet Tribal Council and the smaller In-SHUCK-ch Nation on the lower Lillooet River to the southwest, and the independent N'quatqua First Nation at the near end of Anderson Lake from Mount Currie, which is the main reserve of the Lilʼwat First Nation, and also one of the largest Indian reserves by population in Canada.

The Lilʼwat First Nation's offices are located at Mount Currie, British Columbia, about 5 miles east of Pemberton, British Columbia, which is also located in the Lillooet River valley. Mount Currie is also about 20 miles "as the crow flies" from the luxury destination resort of Whistler, British Columbia.

== Lilʼwat and Lillooet ==
"Líl̓wat", which is the origin of the post-colonial name for all Stʼatʼimc peoples (a.k.a. the Lillooet people), is from a Stʼatʼimcets word referring to a variety of wild onion, one of the local indigenous food staples. The name became applied to the town that is today's Lillooet in 1860, when the population of the town petitioned the chiefs of what are now the Upper Stʼatʼimc and the Lilʼwat for the right to use the name, which was viewed as more harmonious that the town's former name of Cayoosh Flat. One reason for the choice of the new name is that the Douglas Road, also known as the Lillooet Trail as it traversed the Lilʼwat country, ended at Cayoosh Flat. The Lilʼwat and Stʼatʼimc chiefs agreed to the proposal, with the result that the Lilʼwat became also known as the Lower Stʼatʼimc, and the former Upper Stʼatʼimc (formerly just Stʼatʼimc) became known as the Upper Lillooet. The name Stʼatʼimc, according to ethnologist James Teit, was originally used only by outsiders to describe the Stʼatʼimcets-speaking peoples west of the Fraser, who he says had no collective name for themselves despite a common language.

== Indian Reserves ==
Indian Reserves under the administration of the Lilʼwat Nation are:

- Challetkohum Indian Reserve No. 5, 0.6 ha. on left bank of the Lillooet River one mile north of Baptiste Smith Indian Reserve No. 1B 50°03′00″N 122°32′00″W
- Challetkohum Indian Reserve No. 9, 2 ha., on left bank of Lillooet River to the east of IR no. 5 50°03′00″N 122°32′00″W
- Lokla Indian Reserve No. 4, ha. on left bank of Birkenhead River 5 miles north of IR No. 1 50°23′00″N 122°43′00″W
- Mount Currie Indian Reserve No. 1, 76.3 ha., at confluence of Lillooet and Birkenhead Rivers, population in 2006: 114 50°18′30″N 122°43′00″W
- Mount Currie Indian Reserve No. 2, 42.5 ha., on island in the Lillooet River one mile west of IR No. 1. Population in 2006: 15 50°18′00″N 122°44′00″W
- Mount Currie Indian Reserve No. 6, 1618.8 ha., on the left bank of the Lillooet River north of Nesuch IR No. 3. This is the site of the main community and is what is usually meant by the term "Mount Currie Indian Reserve". Population in 2006: 800 (785 Aboriginal identity, 15 non-Aboriginal identity) 50°19′00″N 122°40′00″W
- Mount Currie Indian Reserve No. 7, 129.5 ha., on the north side of I.R. No. 6 50°21′00″N 122°42′00″W
- Mount Currie Indian Reserve No. 8, 656.4 ha. on island in confluence of Lillooet and Birkenhead Rivers, Population in 2006, 72 50°18′00″N 122°42′00″W
- Mount Currie Indian Reserve No. 10, 30.1 ha., west of Creekside, Population in 2006: 180 50°19′10″N 122°43′10″W
- Nesuch Indian Reserve No. 3, 368.1 ha. on right bank of Lillooet River at north end of Lillooet Lake, Population in 2006: 115 (incl. 10 non-Aboriginal) 50°18′00″N 122°38′00″W

== History ==
The people of the Lilʼwat Nation at one time also lived at Pemberton Meadows, about 20 miles northwest up the Lillooet River from Pemberton, but were encouraged by the Oblate fathers to move to their mission at Owl Creek, a few miles up the Birkenhead River from the current reserve at Mount Currie, where the Lilʼwat population relocated after the mission was closed.

During the Fraser Canyon Gold Rush of 1858, tens of thousands of miners and others poured up the Lillooet River system from Harrison Lake to get to the Fraser at what is now the town of Lillooet. The Lilʼwat engaged themselves as canoemen and porters during the heyday of what was known as the Douglas Road, a.k.a. the Lillooet Trail, but after the gold rush all non-native settlement disappeared from the valley until the late 1870s, when John Currie homesteaded on land adjacent to the Mount Currie reserve; the mountain overlooking the site was named for him, and the reserve and townsite that grew up around it were named for the mountain. Currie married the then-chief's daughter and with them helped with the construction of the Lillooet Cattle Trail, and also regularly hired Lilʼwat men (his in-laws) to work on his ranch and also on a couple of (unsuccessful) cattle drives on the disastrous trail to saltwater at Squamish.

== Demographics ==
The registered population of the Lilʼwat Nation is 2,007 members. 1,348 of these live on an Indian Reserve under the band's administration (709 males, 639 females), while 78 live on reserves controlled by another band (40 males, 38 females). 581 band members live off-reserve (267 males, 314 females).

== Economic Development ==
A new subdivision on the hillside above the Birkenhead River has opened up housing for the hard-pressed Mount Currie community, where some family houses date back more than a decade.

The Lilʼwat Nation is a partner with the Squamish Nation in the Weetama Festival, a 2010 Olympics-oriented aboriginal cultural festival for tourist education located in Whistler, British Columbia, which sits astride the overlapping territorial claims of the Lilʼwat and Squamish.

== Social, Educational and Cultural Programs and Facilities ==
In July 2008, the Lilʼwat First Nation partnered with their neighbours the Squamish Nation to open the multimillion-dollar Squamish Lilwat Cultural Centre in Whistler. The two nations, whose territories traditionally overlapped around the Whistler area, had signed a Protocol Agreement in 2001 to work together on such opportunities. The centre features traditional art, cultural and historical displays, wood carvings, an 80-seat theatre, longhouse, pithouse, outdoor forest walk, cafe and giftshop.

== See also ==
- Stʼatʼimc
- Lillooet language
- Lillooet Tribal Council
