= Mount Ronayne =

Mountain in the country of Canada

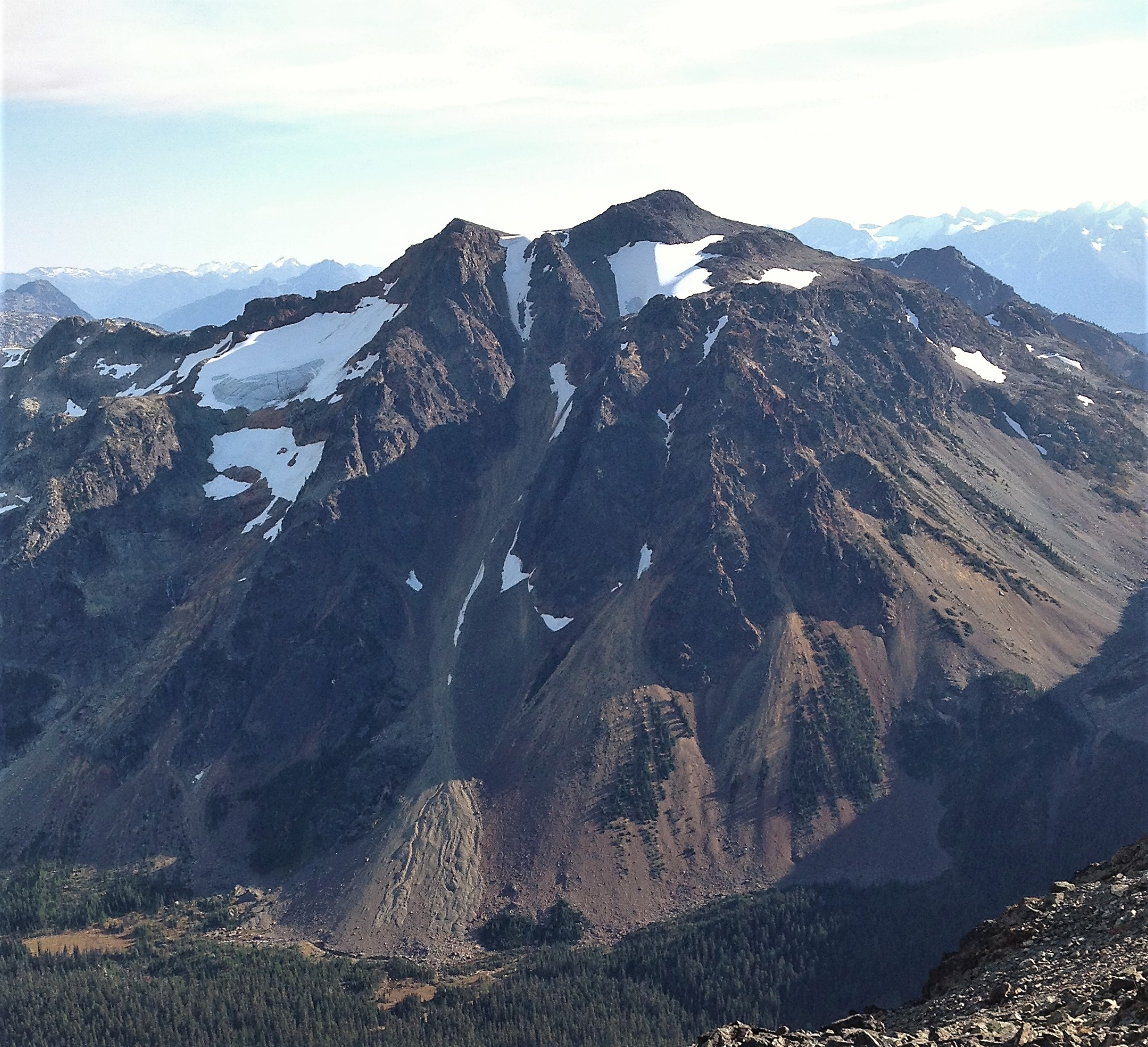
- North aspect

Highest point
- Elevation: 2,290 m (7,513 ft)
- Prominence: 600 m (1,969 ft)
- Parent peak: Seven O'clock Mountain (2,341 m)
- Isolation: 3.02 km (1.88 mi)
- Listing: Mountains of British Columbia
- Coordinates: 50°28′09″N 122°49′35″W

Naming
- Etymology: John Ronayne

Geography
- Location within British Columbia Location within Canada
- Interactive map of Mount Ronayne
- Country: Canada
- Province: British Columbia
- District: Lillooet Land District
- Parent range: Coast Mountains
- Topo map: NTS 92J7 Pemberton

Climbing
- Easiest route: Hiking via Tenas Creek valley

Mount Ronayne is a 2,290-metre (7,513-foot) summit located in the Pemberton Valley of British Columbia, Canada.

== Description ==
Mount Ronayne is situated in the Coast Mountains, 16 km (10 mi) north of Pemberton and 3.85 km (2 mi) west-southwest of Sun God Mountain, the nearest higher neighbor. Precipitation runoff and glacial meltwater from the mountain's north slope drains into Tenas Creek, the east slope drains to Fowl Creek, and the south slope drains to Owl Creek, all of which are tributaries of the Birkenhead River. Mount Ronayne is more notable for its steep rise above local terrain than for its absolute elevation as topographic relief is significant with the summit rising 1,000 meters (3,280 ft) above Tenas Creek in 2 km (1.2 mi), and 2,050 meters (6,725 ft) above the Lillooet River in 6 km (3.7 mi).

== Etymology ==
The mountain is named after John Ronayne, an Irish veteran of the Klondike Gold Rush who settled in the Pemberton Meadows area in 1906. The name was proposed by Walter Girling to honor the judge and his family who were among the early settlers in Pemberton Valley and were instrumental in advancing the interests of the Pemberton area. The mountain's toponym was officially adopted November 5, 1946, by the Geographical Names Board of Canada. John Ronayne is credited with the 1931 first ascent of nearby Sun God Mountain, and the 1935 first ascent of Mount Sampson which is further up the Pemberton Valley.

== Climate ==
Based on the Köppen climate classification, Mount Ronayne is located in a subarctic climate zone of western North America. Most weather fronts originate in the Pacific Ocean, and travel east toward the Coast Mountains where they are forced upward by the range (Orographic lift), causing them to drop their moisture in the form of rain or snowfall. As a result, the Coast Mountains experience high precipitation, especially during the winter months in the form of snowfall. Winter temperatures can drop below −20 °C with wind chill factors below −30 °C. This climate supports small glacier remnants on the north slope. The months July through September offer the most favorable weather for climbing Mount Ronayne.

== Gallery ==
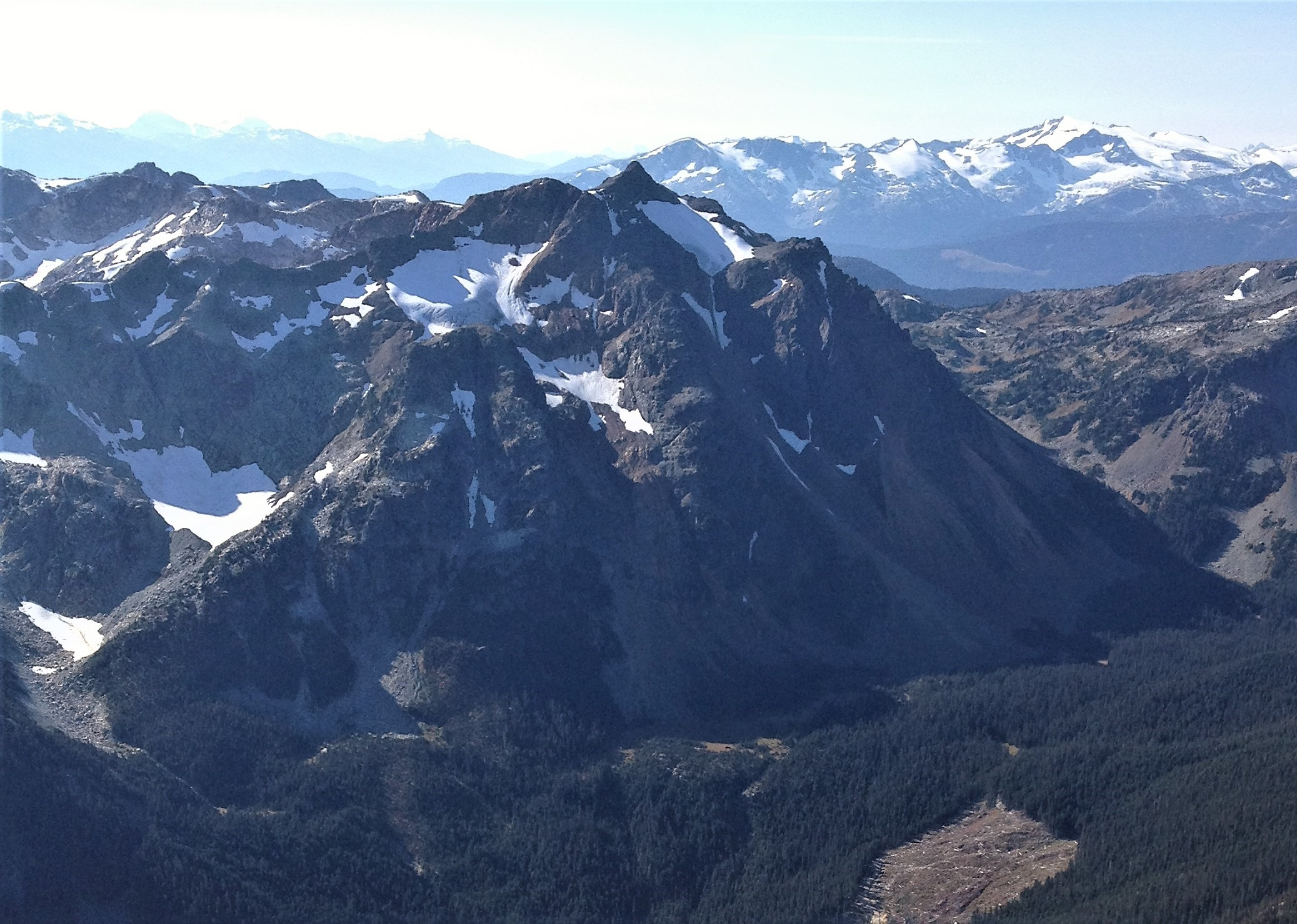
Northeast aspect of Mount Ronayne viewed from Sun God Mountain

== See also ==
- Geography of British Columbia
