= History of flooding in Canada =

The history of flooding in Canada includes floods caused by snowmelt runoff or freshet flooding, storm-rainfall and "flash flooding", ice jams during ice formation and spring break-up, natural dams, coastal flooding on ocean or lake coasts from storm surges, hurricanes and tsunamis. Urban flooding can be caused by stormwater runoff, riverine flooding and structural failure when engineered flood management structures, including dams and levees, prove inadequate to manage the quantities and force of flood waters. Floods can also occur when groundwater levels rise entering buildings cracks in foundation, floors and basements. Flooding is part of the natural environmental process. Flooding along large river systems is more frequent in spring where peak flows are often governed by runoff volume due to rainfall and snowmelt, but can take place in summer with flash floods in urban systems that respond to short-duration, heavy rainfall. Flooding due to hurricanes, or downgraded severe storms, is a concern from August to October when tropical storms can affect Eastern North America. Flood events have had a significant effect on various regions of the country. Flooding is the costliest natural disaster for Canadians. Most home insurance claims in Canada deal with water damage due to sewer back-up, not fire.

Floods occur five times as often as wildfires, the second most frequent natural hazard in Canada. Between 1900 and 2005 there were 241 flood disasters in Canada. (Note: "Events in the Canadian Disaster Database meet at least one of the following criteria: 10 or more people killed; 100 or more people affected/injured/evacuated or homeless; An appeal for national or international assistance was made; It was an event of historical significance; There was a level of damage/disruption such that the community affected could not recover on its own (PSC, 2007) Canadian Disaster Database.)

The 1894 Fraser River flood had a return period of slightly more than 500 years and the 1948 flood was close to a 200-year event. The 1997 Red River flood was named the 'flood of the century'. The International Joint Commission (IJC)'s (Note: The Boundary Waters Treaty of 1909 "established the International Joint Commission (IJC) as an organization designed to resolve disputes and to avoid conflicts between Canada and the United States from coast to coast (Krantzberg 2007, p. 2).") 1998 report warned that although the 1997 Red River flood had a "return interval ranging from 100 to 500 years, depending on the location", there was a "statistical probability of a similar flood each year." The 2011 Assiniboine River Flood was estimated to have a return interval of 300 years.

The Calgary flood had a return interval ranging from 70 to 100 years. A 100-year flood has a 1-percent annual exceedance probability (AEP) flood. (Note: "In the 1960s, the United States government decided to use the 1-percent annual exceedance probability (AEP) flood as the basis for the National Flood Insurance Program. The 1-percent AEP flood was thought to be a fair balance between protecting the public and overly stringent regulation. Because the 1-percent AEP flood has a 1 in 100 chance of being equalled or exceeded in any 1 year, and it has an average recurrence interval of 100 years, it often is referred to as the "100-year flood" USGS 2010.") (Note: The 100-year flood is generally expressed as a flowrate. Based on the expected 100-year flood flow rate in a given creek, river or surface water system, the flood water level can be mapped as an area of inundation. The resulting floodplain map is referred to as the 100-year floodplain, which may figure very importantly in building permits, environmental regulations, and flood insurance.) with a flow of the Bow River in Calgary measured at c.1,740 m^{3}/s (61,000 cu ft/s) when the flood reached its peak level on June 21, 2013.

== Large flood disasters in Canada and estimated total costs ==
Table from Data sources.
Year	Province	City/Location	Total Costs in millions CAD (trended to 2008)
1954	ON	Southern ON (Hurricane Hazel)	5,392
1948	BC	Fraser River	5,172
1950	MB	Winnipeg	4,652
1996	QC	Saguenay	2,699
1997	MB	Southern Manitoba	1,230
1948	ON	Southern Ontario	706
1993	MB	Winnipeg	618
2005	ON	Southern Ontario	1,587
2005	AB	High River, Southern AB	1,519
1937	ON	Southern Ontario	470
1923	NB	Saint John River Basin	463
1955	SK/MB	Manitoba and Saskatchewan	362
2004	AB	Edmonton	303
1995	AB	Southern Alberta	285
1934	NB	Plaster Rock	198
1936	NB	New Brunswick	188
1999	MB	Melita	163
1916	ON	Central Ontario	161
1909	NB	Chester	149
1961	NB	Saint John River Basin	148
1987	QC	Montréal	147
1996	QC	Montréal and Mauricie Region	145
1920	ON	Southwestern Ontario	132
1920	BC	Prince George	131
2004	ON	Peterborough	129
1972	QC	Richelieu River	124
1983	NF	Newfoundland	115
1974	QC	Maniwaki	103

== List of floods ==
=== 1879 Fort Calgary flood ===
The flood of 1879 had an estimated peak rate of 2,265 m^{3}/s (80,000 cu ft/s) based on high-water marks.

=== 1894 Fraser River flood ===
The largest flood of British Columbia's Fraser River on record occurred in May 1894, when rapid snow melt caused river levels to rise dramatically, triggering flooding from Agassiz to Richmond. The flood was significant in both height and breadth. In 2008, Northwest Hydraulic Consultants (NHC) recommended the adoption of the following flood frequency estimates at the Hope gauge on the Fraser River: 100 year daily maximum flow 14,700 m^{3}/s (520,000 cu ft/s); 200 year daily maximum flow 15,600 m^{3}/s (550,000 cu ft/s); 500 year daily maximum flow 16,800 m^{3}/s (590,000 cu ft/s). The Fraser's highest recorded flow, in June 1894, is estimated to have been 17,000 cubic metres per second (600,000 cu ft/s) or within a range of about16,000 to 18,000 cubic metres per second (570,000 to 640,000 cu ft/s) at Hope. Based on these flows, the 1894 flood had a return period of slightly more than 500 years and the 1948 flood was close to a 200-year event. Of the two catastrophic floods on the Lower Fraser River since European settlement in the Fraser Valley, the flood of 1894 is considered to be the "flood of record", but the flood of 1948 caused greater damage because of "intensive development" on the flood plain.

=== 1897 Fort Calgary flood ===
The flood of 1897 had an estimated peak rate of 2,265 m^{3}/s (80,000 cu ft/s) based on high-water marks. In comparison, 116 years later, in June 2013, the Bow River in Calgary peaked at c.1,740 m^{3}/s (61,000 cu ft/s).

=== 1902 Saint John River flood ===
In March 1902, fifteen ice jams in the Saint John River basin resulted in some of the worst floods on that river in the 20th century with two deaths, and extensive damage to bridges, roads, railways, and lumber mills.

The Saint John River has a long history of flooding from 1696. Major reported flood events took place in 1887, 1902, 1923, 1936, 1970, 1973, 1976, 1979, and 1987, 2018.

=== 1915 Calgary flood ===
The 1915 Bow River flood in Calgary in June washed away the MacArthur Bridge, drowning city employee Edwin Tambling, and nearly drowning Calgary Commissioner for Public Works Jim Garden, and Aldermen Samuel Hunter Adams. Three people would die as a result of the flood. The Bow River rose 2.1 m (6.9 ft) above normal, a record height. The MacArthur Bridge was replaced by the Centre Street Bridge in 1916. The Sheep Creek floods in Okotoks cut gas mains left Calgarians without cooking fuel.

=== 1929 Calgary and southern Alberta flood ===
In June 1929, widespread flooding in southern Alberta caused major damage in Calgary and High River when the Bow River, Highwood River, and other rivers and creeks overflowed caused by extensive rainfall. Among some of the damage caused was extensive damage to the Calgary Zoo where several animals were killed, roads washed out at Banff, and homes flooded in Mission.

In June 1923, the Elbow River broke the 1915 record by 20 cm (7.9 in) when it rises to 2.9 m (9.5 ft). The Bow River, though it rises 1.5 m (4.9 ft) above normal, is still about .6 m (2.0 ft) under the 1915 record height.

=== 1929 Tsunami Burin Peninsula, Newfoundland flood ===
On November 18, 1929, a tsunami struck the Burin Peninsula, Newfoundland, after a large-scale Grand Banks earthquake. Sometime after the quake, many people noticed the water draining out of the coves and harbours. In St. Lawrence, "the harbour bottom, which on average is 10 m (33 ft) deep, was visible in places." "As the water receded, it exposed portions of the ocean floor that were normally submerged and caused boats docked at various harbours to tumble over onto their sides. Minutes later, three successive waves hit the shore and water levels rose dramatically." Three waves hit the coast at 105 km/h (65 mph) about three hours after the earthquake occurred. "In most places, the sea level swelled three to seven metres above normal, but in some of the peninsula's long narrow bays, such as at Port au Bras, St. Lawrence, and Taylor's Bay, the water rose by between 13 m (43 ft) to 27 m (89 ft)." The waves travelled at speeds up to 129 km/h (80 mph) at the epicentre; they were recorded as far away as Portugal. The tsunami destroyed many south coastal communities on the Burin Peninsula, killing 27 or 28 people, sweeping away homes, businesses, wharves, and fishing boats, and leaving 10,000 more homeless.

=== 1948 Fraser River flood ===
In 1948, the second largest Fraser River flood of record occurred. By this time, the Lower Fraser Valley was a highly developed agricultural area, with commercial and industrial development and the beginnings of residential development. As well, two transcontinental rail lines and the Trans-Canada Highway had been built through the valley, and the province's major airport had been established in Richmond. Personal and financial impact was much greater than in 1894. Thousands of people were displaced and infrastructure, including bridges and roads, was significantly damaged. Based on the 2008 NHC estimates of a 200-year daily maximum flow of 15,600 m^{3}/s (550,000 cu ft/s), the 1948 flood was close to a 200-year event. The flood of 1948 caused greater damage than the 1894 flood because of "intensive development" on the flood plain. At the height of the 1948 flood, 50,000 acres (200 km^{2}) stood under water. Dykes broke at Agassiz, Chiliwack, Nicomen Island, Glen Valley, and Matsqui. By the time the flood waters receded a month later, 16,000 people had been evacuated, and damages totalled $20,000,000.

=== 1950 Red River flood ===
During the 1950 Red River flood the Red River reached its highest level since 1861 resulting in a major flood from April to June turning 600 mi/s (970 km/s) of Manitoba farmland into a vast inland sea. On May 18, the Red River reached 30.3 feet above normal. Approximately 107,000 people were evacuated from the area. Prime Minister Louis St. Laurent called it the "most catastrophic flood ever seen in Canada". Only one person, Lawson Ogg, lost his life to the flood. Estimated costs were from $600,000,000 CAD to over $1,000,000,000 CAD.

The province of Manitoba completed the Red River Floodway in 1968 after six years of excavation, put up permanent dikes in eight towns south of Winnipeg, and built clay dikes and diversion dams in the Winnipeg area. Other flood control structures completed later were the Portage Diversion and the Shellmouth Dam on the Assiniboine.

=== 1954 Toronto region flood: Hurricane Hazel ===
The most famous hurricane in Canadian history struck on October 15, 1954, causing catastrophic flooding. Hurricane Hazel submerged low-lying land from Etobicoke to the Holland Marsh and left 81 people dead. No natural disaster since has led to such a high death toll in Canada. Over 4,000 families were left homeless.

Sandink argued that there are major discrepancies in cost estimates for flood damage in general and for Hurricane Hazel in particular. Neither insurance companies nor governments cover the full damage. The Department of Public Safety and Emergency Preparedness Canada estimates the total cost of Hurricane Hazel for Canada, taking into account long-term effects such as economic disruption, the cost of lost property, and recovery costs, as being $137,552,400 CAD. University of Western Ontario Geography professor Dan Shrubsole estimated the costs at about $2,000,000,000 CAD (2008). Environment Canada estimated the flood damages at $25,000,000 (1954) or $205 million (in 2008 dollars)

In the Toronto area, winds reached 110 km (68 mi) per hour and there was 285 mm (11.2 in) of rain in 48 hours. The Humber River, located in the west end of the city, caused the most destruction, as a result of an intense flash flood. Toronto's infrastructure took a heavy hit. Not built to withstand serious flooding, as it is in a climate area that does not see exceptionally prolonged or heavy rainfall, over 50 bridges, many part of important highways, were heavily damaged or put out of commission, when high water itself washed them out or debris in the water smashed them. Numerous roads and railways were also washed out. At the peak of the flooding, the Don River's flow rate was 1,680 m^{3}/s (59,000 cu ft/s). Normally the Don River flow is 10 m^{3}/s (350 cu ft/s) rising to 100 m^{3}/s (3,500 cu ft/s) during the spring.

By 1959, as a result of Hurricane Hazel, a regional approach to flood control and water management was adopted in Ontario and by 1959 the Metropolitan Toronto and Region Conservation Authority (MTRCA) finalized a comprehensive Plan for Flood Control and Water Conservation, which included the proposed development of large dams and major flood control channels, with future plans for an erosion control program and the acquisition of 7,300 acres of land.

=== 1973 Saint John River flood ===
Known as the Great Flood of 1973, this flood in late April 1973 was driven by a combination of snow melt and heavy rain. Flooding occurred almost the entire length of the river, with the worst damage in the Fredericton area. At the time it was the most serious flood on the Saint John River in historic times.

=== 1974 Grand River flood ===
In May 1974, several communities along the Grand River were flooded as a result of 50 mm of rain falling in the upper part of the watershed, quickly overflowing reservoirs which had been filled to capacity in anticipation of the dry summers months. The flooding caused almost $7 million (unadjusted) in damage, with more the $5 million of that coming from Galt, Ontario. Significant improvements were made to the dike system along the river which could withstand a flow rate of 2,352 m^{3}/s in Cambridge and 3,400 m^{3}/s in Brantford, significantly above the 1,800 m^{3}/s peak during the flood.

=== 1979 Tropical Storm David hit Moncton ===
In September 1979, Tropical Storm David caused an estimated $881,600 CAD (1998) in flood damages in the area around Moncton, New Brunswick.

=== 1984 Pemberton Valley flooding ===
In October 1984, a large rain system held its ground over Howe Sound and the Fraser Valley regions, leading to unprecedented rains on alpine snowpacks in the area of the Pemberton Valley. Waters backed up from Lillooet Lake to the Village of Pemberton overnight. North of that, the valley was flooded for 30 miles (48 km) upstream past Pemberton Meadows, caused by the dual "dams" created by the causeways used to cross the valley between Pemberton and Mount Currie, with the deepest waters reaching 10 feet above normal. 100 families were evacuated.

=== 1986 Winisk flood ===
On May 16, 1986, the Northern Ontario community of Winisk was completely washed away. A spring ice jam on the Winisk River caused flood waters to reach as far as 6 km (3.7 miles) inland, sending every structure but two into the Hudson Bay.

=== 1987 Montreal flood ===
The Montreal Flood of 1987 happened on July 14 of that year when a series of strong thunderstorms crossed the island of Montreal, Canada, between the noon hour and 2:30 p.m. Over 100 mm (3.9 in) of rain fell during this very short period of time. The sewer systems were overwhelmed by the deluge and the city was paralyzed by the flooded roads. Autoroute 15, a sunken highway also known as the Decarie Expressway, soon filled with water trapping motorists. Some 350,000 houses lost electricity, and tens of thousands had flooded basements. Two people died, one in a submerged car and another who was electrocuted.

=== 1996 Saguenay flood ===
The Saguenay Flood (French: Déluge du Saguenay) was a series of flash floods that hit the Saguenay-Lac-Saint-Jean region of Quebec, Canada on July 19, 20 and 21 1996.

Problems started after two weeks of constant rain, which severely engorged soils, rivers and reservoirs. The Saguenay region is a geological graben, which increased the effect of the sudden massive rains of July 19, 1996. In the span of a few hours, 11 in (280 mm) fell on the region, the equivalent to the amount of rain usually received in a month. The 1996 Saguenay Flood resulted in large Disaster Financial Assistance Arrangements (DFAA) payments.

=== 1997 Red River flood, 'flood of the century': a return interval ranging from 100 to 500 years ===
According to the Red River Basin Task Force News, the Red River Flood of 1997 "deserved the superlative, the 'flood of the century'." The flood along the Red River of the North in North Dakota, Minnesota, and Southern Manitoba, in April and May 1997 was the most severe Red River flood since 1826. The International Joint Commission (IJC)'s 1998 report warned that although the 1997 Red River flood had a "return interval ranging from 100 to 500 years, depending on the location", there was a "statistical probability of a similar flood each year." It was the most severe flood of the river since 1826.

Flooding in Manitoba resulted in over $500 million in damages, although the Red River Floodway, an artificial waterway affectionately known as "Duff's Ditch" saved Winnipeg from flooding. This flood stimulated improvements to the flood protection system.

In Manitoba flood waters reached 21.6 ft (6.6 m), which caused 28,000 people to be evacuated and $500 million CAD in damage to property and infrastructure. The 1997 Red River Flood resulted in large DFAA payments.

The flood came close to overcoming Winnipeg's existing flood protection system. At the time, the Winnipeg Floodway was designed to protect against a flow 60,000 cu ft/s (1,700 m^{3}/s), but the 1997 flow was 63,000 cu ft/s (1,800 m^{3}/s). To compensate, the province broke operational rules for the floodway, as defined in legislation, during the night of April 30 / May 1, preventing waters in Winnipeg from rising above the designed limit of 24.5 ft (7.5 m) above the "James Avenue datum", but causing additional flooding upriver. The mayor of Winnipeg, announcing what should have been the bad news that the design limit had been reached, misinterpreted this as good news that the flooding had peaked. City sand-bagging stopped, and national reporters left the city, but the water continued to rise inside and outside of the city until the actual peak late on May 3 / early on May 4. The city sometimes claims the peak occurred on May 1, while more scientific reports record a peak on May 3/4.

=== 2003 Pemberton / Sea to Sky flood ===
In the fall of 2003, a Pineapple Express system delivered more rain than ever in recorded history to the Sea to Sky region, and was compounded by the freezing line in the mountains being above the elevation of the many icefields in the region, causing immense amounts of meltwater on creeks coming out of them. Highway and rail bridges at Rutherford Creek were washed out by the torrent coming down that watercourse from the Pemberton Icecap, wrecking three vehicles and taking five lives. Meteorologists said that a storm such as this one happens only once a century. 200-350 millimetres of rain fell on the Village of Pemberton, while Squamish received 325 mm (12.8 in), 15% of the town's annual total. In addition to the Rutherford Creek bridges, another was washed out in the Cheakamus Canyon area of Highway 99, with the resort municipality of Whistler being cut off from the outside world during this storm.

=== 2004 ===
A "severe storm in Edmonton, Alberta in 2004 resulted in approximately $166,000,000 CAD in insured damages, $143,000,000 CAD of which were associated with sewer backup."

=== 2005 ===
In 2005, "heavy rainfall and associated flooding resulted in $300,000,000 CAD in insured damages in southern Alberta."

"Newfoundland and Labrador experienced a severe spring storm on March 31, 2005 with record-setting snow and rain that resulted in flood damage to homes and provincial and local government infrastructure, primarily in the Burin Peninsula. The payment of $388,288 CAD announced on June 8, 2010 represents the total federal share for this event."

An "extreme rainfall event that affected a large region of southern Ontario from Hamilton to Durham Region in August 2005 resulted in over $500,000,000 CAD in insured damages, $247,000,000 CAD of which was associated with sewer backup."

=== 2007 ===
The Saskatchewan 2007 Spring Summer Flood DFAA payments are estimated at $138,000,000 CAD.

=== 2008 Saint John River flood ===
During the month of April and May a rapid melt of snow set by an unusually severe winter caused the Saint John River to reach a height off 8.6 m (28 ft) matching and in some places surpassing the flood of the river in 1973, which caused $11,900,000 CAD in damages. It is the highest level of the Saint John river recorded.

=== 2009 Red River flood ===
The 2009 Red River flood was a major flood in March and April 2009 along the Red River of the North in North Dakota, Minnesota, and Southern Manitoba. The flood crested at 40.82 ft (12.44 m) on March 28, 2009, for Fargo, North Dakota. "Southern Manitoba experienced the most widespread flooding along the Assiniboine River on record. Environment Canada said the flooding lasted for 120 days. Water levels rose so high in Lake Manitoba that some beach front homes ended up 3 km (1.9 mi) into the lake. The Manitoba government estimated 7,100 residents were displaced from their homes. Flood-fighting and compensation cost causing $1 billion." The CAD60 million Red River Floodway was built to mitigate flood damage on the Red River. Since its completion in the 1960s, it has saved an estimated CAD30 billion in damages in 20 flooding events.

=== 2010 Southern Alberta and Saskatchewan flood ===
The total cost of the June 17, 2010 Southern Alberta and Saskatchewan flood was CAD956,350,000 (2010). DFAA payments are estimated at CAD90 million. 2,065 people were evacuated.

=== 2010 Hurricane Igor in Newfoundland ===
The 2010 Hurricane Igor that affected Newfoundland DFAA payments are estimated at CAD82 million.

=== 2011 Assiniboine River flood ===
The 2011 Assiniboine River flood is a major flood in May 2011 along the Assiniboine River south of Portage la Prairie in Manitoba. The flood is expected in impact an 225 km/s (140 mi/s) area along the River south of Portage la Prairie. About 100 Canadian Forces personnel were in the region helping out in controlling the flooding. Damages totalled CAD 1 billion The river peaked at about 37,100 cu ft/s (1,050 m^{3}/s),60% higher than the previous highest recorded peak of 23,000 cu ft/s (650 m^{3}/s) in 1923. The 2011 event is estimated to be a 1 in 300-year flood. The 2011 Manitoba Floods DFAA payments are estimated at CAD347 million.

=== 2012 Thunder Bay to Montreal ===
In May 2012, a "storm system that affected Thunder Bay and moved through to Montreal resulted in CAD 260 million in insured damages."

In July, 2012, a "storm moved through southern Ontario affecting several neighbourhoods in Hamilton and Ottawa, resulting in CAD 90 million in insured damages."

=== 2013 Calgary and Southern Alberta Flood ===
The 2013 Calgary and Southern Alberta Flood started on June 20, 2013, and was focused in communities in and around Calgary. Waters rose quickly and by June 21, 100,000 had been evacuated. Government officials co-ordinated information on social media, and the City of Calgary's official website was replaced with its blog with up-to-the-minute information on the emergency.

On June 20, 2013, widespread flooding in southern Alberta caused major damage in Canmore, Calgary and High River when the Cougar Creek, Highwood River, and other rivers and creeks overflowed caused by extensive rainfall. Other communities in the area were also affected, or were expected to be, by floods. Flooding also caused power outages and the closure of the Trans-Canada Highway and Highway 1A, as well as many other highways and roads. A man and a woman were reported missing after a mobile home was swept into the Highwood River near the town of Black Diamond; the man was later rescued, but the woman remained missing.

In a 1973 City of Calgary flood plain management report by Montreal Engineering Co. Ltd., estimates of flood-frequency of the Bow River upstream of the Elbow River in Calgary provided the following results: There is a 10-percent annual exceedance probability (AEP) flood or a 10-year flood return period with a peak flow or flood discharge reaching 850 m^{3}/s (30,000 cu ft/s); there is a 4.5-percent annual exceedance probability (AEP) flood or 22-year flood return period with a peak flow or flood discharge reaching 1,420 m^{3}/s (50,000 cu ft/s); there is a 1.4-percent annual exceedance probability (AEP) flood or 70-year flood return period with a peak flow or flood discharge reaching 2,270 m^{3}/s (80,000 cu ft/s); there is a 0.7-percent annual exceedance probability (AEP) flood or 150-year flood return period with a peak flow or flood discharge reaching 2,840 m^{3}/s (100,000 cu ft/s).

At c. 7 am on 21 June 2013 the Bow River at the Calgary station, upstream of the Elbow, peaked at c.1,740 m^{3}/s (61,000 cu ft/s). In 2005 the peak flow was 791 m^{3}/s (27,900 cu ft/s) and in 1932 the peak flow was 1,520 m^{3}/s (54,000 cu ft/s). Only the floods of 1879 and 1897 in then Fort Calgary has higher peak rates, estimated at 2,265 m^{3}/s (80,000 cu ft/s) based on high-water marks. This is a 100 Year Flood Map for Calgary, Alberta similar to the one produced in 1973 by Montreal Engineering Co. Ltd.

=== 2013 Southern Ontario Flash Flood ===
On July 8, 2013, two thunderstorm systems merged over Southern Ontario, causing widespread flooding and power outages in Toronto and other parts of the Greater Toronto Area, including Mississauga. Up to 126 mm (5.0 in) of rain fell over Toronto in 90 minutes, surpassing the July monthly average for the city, causing flash flooding during the evening rush hour period. The storm flooding caused power outages for up to 300,000 people in Toronto and approximately 80% of Mississauga, and caused disruptions for commuters, including 1,400 passengers who were stranded on a train operated by GO Transit for approximately 7 hours.

=== 2017 Quebec floods ===
On May 3, 2017, Eastern Canada experienced flooding after excessive rainfall, with Quebec flooded the most. Montreal and Laval then declared a state of emergency over the flooding.

=== 2019 spring floods in Ontario, Quebec, New Brunswick ===
The 2019 spring floods in Ontario, Quebec and New Brunswick were exceptional floods in eastern Ontario, southern Quebec and from the St. John River region to New Brunswick, Canada. In fact, flooding along the Ottawa River has been recognized as the most important weather event of the year 2019 in Canada, and the one along the Saint John River as the ninth, by Environment and Climate Change Canada. The flooding caused by the rapid spring snow melt, coupled with frozen ground, and several heavy rain events that resulted in abnormally high cumulative rainfall for April and May.

=== 2021 British Columbia floods ===
On November 14, 2021, an atmospheric river brought heavy rains to parts of British Columbia, Canada, and neighbouring Washington, United States, causing flooding and mudslides.

=== 2024 British Columbia floods ===
On October 18, 2024, an atmospheric river caused heavy rain to the coastal parts of British Columbia, Canada and the northwestern parts of Washington, United States.

=== 2025 British Columbia floods ===
In December 2025, an atmospheric river caused flooding in British Columbia (as well as parts of the United States). This resulted in a State of Local Emergency and highways being closed.

=== 2026 Ontario Floods ===
In the summer of 2026, there was flooding in the Niagara Region and around Toronto. From July 27th to July 28th, there was serious flooding in St. Catharines and Niagara Falls, Ontario. Flooding caused CAD 360 million in damage.

== Quantity and force of flooding events increasing ==
Between 2003 and 2013 Canada had nine disasters with damages surpassing CAD 500 million each. Prior to that only three Canadian disasters exceeded CAD 500 million in damages. The Centre for Research on the Epidemiology of Disasters (CRED) reports that the cost of natural disasters rose 14-fold since the 1950s.

== Meteorology ==
On average, although regions differ markedly, Canada has become wetter since the 1950s. Mean precipitation across Canada increasing by about 12%. the high Arctic received the largest percentage increase in precipitation. From the 1950s through 2002, the Prairies experienced little change or a decline.

Environment and Climate Change Canada (ECCC)'s Climate Research Division summarized annual precipitation changes, evaluating records up to 2007. They observed: "Precipitation has generally increased over Canada since 1950 with the majority of stations with significant trends showing increases. The increasing trend is most coherent over northern Canada where many stations show significant increases. There is not much evidence of clear regional patterns in stations showing significant changes in seasonal precipitation except for significant decreases which tend to be concentrated in the winter season over southwestern and southeastern Canada. Also, increasing precipitation over the Arctic appears to be occurring in all seasons except summer." Changing annual precipitation patterns can affect spring flood conditions on large river systems but would generally not affect flash flooding in urban systems.

ECCC climate specialists have also assessed trends in short-duration rainfall patterns affecting flash flooding. Data include annual maximum observations at climate stations, documented in Engineering Climate Datasets. ECCC notes: "Short-duration (5 minutes to 24 hours) rainfall extremes are important for a number of purposes, including engineering infrastructure design, because they represent the different meteorological scales of extreme rainfall events." A "general lack of a detectable trend signal", meaning no overall change in extreme, short-duration rainfall patterns, was observed. In relation to design criteria used for urban drainage design (e.g., Intensity-Duration-Frequency (IDF) statistics), the evaluation "shows that fewer than 5.6% and 3.4% of the stations have significant increasing and decreasing trends, respectively, in extreme annual maximum single location observation amounts." On a regional basis, southwest and the east (Newfoundland) coastal regions generally showed significant increasing regional trends for 1 and 2 hour extreme rainfall durations. Decreasing regional trends for 5 to 15 minute rainfall amounts were observed in the St. Lawrence region of southern Quebec and in the Atlantic provinces.

In some instances, future predicted changes in short term rainfall extremes have been misreported as historical changes. A theoretical one-standard deviation shift in mean extreme rainfall intensity has been misreported as Environment Canada data, suggesting that storms occurring every 40 years are occurring every 6 years", based on a standard, normal probability density function (see presentation 13:10). It has also been reported that 20 times more storms are occurring than 20 years ago, and that this is affecting urban flood water damages and insurance premiums - ECCC has commented that there are no such significant changes in storm patterns.

== Hydrology ==
Changes in precipitation impacted on stream flows which decreased in "southern Canada by about 8%" during the period covered in the study. Trends in Canadian streamflow have also been reported by Zhang et al. for a 30-50 year period using the Canadian Reference Hydrometric Basin Network database. It was reported that annual mean streamflow has generally decreased, with significant decreases detected in the southern Canada. Also monthly mean streamflow decreased for most months with greatest decreases in August and September. In March and April, significant increases in streamflow were observed suggesting the potential for greater spring flooding in large, gauged river systems. Daily streamflow frequency increased significantly over northern British Columbia and the Yukon Territory, and decreased significantly in southern Canada, in all percentiles of the daily streamflow distribution. Significantly earlier breakup of river ice and resulting spring freshet occur in British Columbia consistent due to spring warming trends. There was no evidence to suggest changes in the frequency of heavy precipitation events (daily rainfall/snowfall larger than a threshold value which is exceeded by an average of three events per year) across Canada.

Flow rates and flood risks in small un-gauged drainage systems throughout urban areas can follow a different trend than large river systems in the Canadian Reference Hydrometric Basin Network database. Hydrology in smaller drainage basins is governed by the degree of urbanization and impermeable, high-runoff surfaces. In the Don River Watershed in the Lake Ontario basin, urbanization of 15 percent of in 1950 is predicted to become 91 percent in 2021. Average annual flows in the Don River have increased by 0.44% per year since the early 1960s.

== Geography ==
From 1975 to 1990 Canada's Flood Damage Reduction Program was part of a more active federal flood reduction approach. Through the Flood Damage Reduction Program, the federal and provincial governments shared costs of "mapping all the floodplains" and "creating standard flood risk evaluations." Most provinces and territories joined the Program.

== Economic implications ==
Before 1990, only three Canadian disasters exceeded CAD 500 million in damages. In the past decade alone, nine surpassed that amount. In his 2013 publication, Slobodan P. Simonovic, Professor of Civil and Environmental Engineering, called for an investment in the reduction or minimization of future flooding instead of going from disaster to disaster, reacting after the fact.

In 2013 an Insurance Bureau of Canada commissioned report noted that, "On average, Canada now experiences 20 more days of rain compared with the 1950s." In the same report McBean noted that "the recent spike in extreme weather-related events" in Canada "resulted in social and economic consequences for individuals, governments, and home and business insurers around the country." During a presentation of the report to the Empire Club of Canada, McBean associated flooding of Toronto's Union Station on June 1, 2012, with "unthinkable" severe weather and other historic floods in Canada (see presentation 3:14), while it was later revealed the flooding was caused by construction contractors actions and the removal of an adjacent sewer. This highlights the need to critically evaluate causes of flooding including those related to hydrology of watersheds and increased runoff rates from drainage catchments, and related to hydraulic capacity of infrastructure systems including temporary construction conditions or other operational constraints.

== Compensation ==
=== Federal government ===
Disaster Financial Assistance Arrangements (DFAA), a Canadian Public Safety federal program, established in 1970, "allows provinces to request federal assistance when the cost of dealing with a disaster is more than CAD1 per capita, based on the province’s population. Eligible expenses include the cost of evacuating residents, restoring infrastructure and public works, and fixing basic and essential personal property. DFAA "support the provinces in providing or reinstating the necessities of life to individuals, including help to repair and restore damaged homes; re-establishing or maintaining the viability of small businesses and working farms; repairing, rebuilding and restoring public works and the essential community services specified in these Guidelines to their pre-disaster capabilities; and funding limited mitigation measures to reduce the future vulnerability of repaired or replaced infrastructure." The "1996 Saguenay Flood, the 1997 Red River Flood and the 1998 Ice Storm resulted in large DFAA payments to affected provinces. DFAA payments of over $1.1 billion were made for these three events. Since 1996, DFAA payments have averaged $110 million per year." The "four most significant events, which represents over 50% of Public Safety’s liabilities, are the 2011 Manitoba Floods estimated at CAD347 million, the Saskatchewan 2007 Spring Summer Flood at CAD138 million, the 2010 Alberta June Rainstorm at CAD90 million and the 2010 Hurricane Igor that affected Newfoundland at CAD82 million."

DFAA
Eligible provincial expense thresholds (per capita of population)	Government of Canada share (percentage)
First $1	0
Next $2	50
Next $2	75
Remainder	90

=== Private insurance: Overland flooding insurance not available in Canada ===
Canada, the provincial and federal government via the Canadian taxpayer, cover the cost of large-scale floods, as private insurers will not cover the cost of homeowners' overland flooding damage. Canada is in a unique situation as the only G8 country where individuals cannot purchase this insurance. According to the IBC 2012 report, "Commercial insurance policies may provide coverage for damage due to overland flooding either as part of the commercial property policy or as a separate policy endorsement. "Private insurers cover sewage backup but won't offer flood protection because the small population base of Canada means it's difficult for the companies to cover the cost of their risk."

In the 1980s local governments typically proceeded from flooding to panic planning, and then to procrastination and the next flood.

Environment Canada had a flood damage reduction program from 1975 to 1998. In 2013 mitigation at the federal level was funded through the Disaster Financial Assistance Arrangements, the Building Canada Fund and Public-Private Partnership Canada. 2011 had a serious flood season. The 2012 "federal budget set aside almost CAD100 million to help the provinces and territories with the cost of permanent flood mitigation projects."

George Groeneveld, MLA for Highwood, headed a flood mitigation committee consisting of representatives from Alberta Infrastructure and Transportation (INFTRA), Alberta Environment (AENV) and Alberta Municipal Affairs (MA). In their report they described how, "In Alberta, major floods along rivers and streams have resulted in loss of lives and hundreds of millions of dollars in damages. Major recent flood events occurred in 1995, 1997 and 2005. River floods can occur throughout the year with precipitation leading to summer floods (1995 and 2005 floods) and river ice creating a potential for flooding in the winter (1997 floods). River flooding in Southern Alberta during the spring of 2005 tragically resulted in the loss of 3 lives and an economic loss of hundreds of millions of dollars."> They noted that, "All levels of government have a role to play in a provincial flood mitigation strategy for Alberta.

For a large flood event, the federal government pays up to 90% of the disaster assistance funds and, therefore, should have an interest in a strategy to reduce economic losses. The province has responsibility for managing natural resources that includes regulating activities in the waterways, flood risk identification and flood forecasting. As well the province is responsible for a portion of disaster assistance funding. The municipal government is responsible for considering flood protection in land use bylaws and emergency management within their community if a flood event were to occur."

One of their most important recommendations was the "cessation of the sale of Crown lands in known flood risk areas." The report noted that "Undeveloped flood plains are the natural and most effective form of flood mitigation, and this recommendation will protect those areas." The 2006 Provincial Flood Mitigation Report "recommended the completion of flood risk maps for urban areas in the province; a program to ensure those maps are updated; the identification of priority rural flood risk areas that require flood risk mapping; and making historic flood information available to the public on a website." The Highwood River at High River is "located at a change in slope of the channel on a basin in an area of high runoff potential, resulting in frequent flooding."

The Institute for Catastrophic Loss Reduction (ICLR) ’s mission "is to reduce the loss of life and property caused by severe weather and earthquakes through the identification and support of sustained actions that improve society’s capacity to adapt to, anticipate, mitigate, withstand and recover from natural disasters. ICLR is achieving its mission through the development and implementation of its programs Open for business, to increase the disaster resilience of small businesses, Designed for safer living, which increases the disaster resilience of homes, and RSVP cities, to increase the disaster resilience of communities." In their February 2013 report, ICLR offered a number of adaptive proactive measures that municipalities could undertake to mitigate damage from sewer backup, which is a serious problem across Canada, for homeowners, municipalities and insurers. During regional sewer backup events, at the lot-side, foundation drainage could be disconnected and eavestrough downspouts angled, to limit inflow of excess water into municipal sanitary sewer systems. Backwater valves reduce the "risk of sewer backup through isolation of homes from underground municipal sewers systems during sewer system surcharge."

=== Soft and hard engineering: landscape-based integration ===
Landscape-based solutions to water management are offered as an "alternative to traditional infrastructure (pumping stations, levees, etc.)." (Note: Eighteen months after the Katrina disaster, Jane Wolff, landscape architecture expert worked with New Orleans community groups on the "Gutter to Gulf" project, focusing on landscape-based solutions such as planting water-absorbing native species in culverts, in New Orleans as an "alternative to traditional infrastructure (pumping stations, levees, etc.).") Municipalities in Canada are encouraging soft engineering practices. After the 1954 flood in Toronto caused by Hurricane Hazel, Ontario "responded with strict floodplain protection legislation." By June 2013 Toronto has seen the completion of the Lower Don River West Remedial Flood Control Project, based on the approved federal EA and provincial Class EA by Toronto and Region Conservation and Toronto Waterfront Revitalization Corporation. The approved flood control strategy included construction of a 8.5 m (28 ft)-high berm designed to protect the eastern downtown from a major flood, even a 500-year storm, by directing potential flood waters south toward the lake, and the construction of additional rail bridge capacity to compensate for lost floodplain flow capacity. The berm is finished as a hilly park with pathways and prairie grasses overlooking the mouth of the Don River, demonstrating the integration of soft and hard engineering practices.

=== Ageing infrastructure and water damage ===
Most of the damage to homes and businesses in Canada during severe weather events like floods is linked to infrastructure failure with a large part of that resulting from water damage due to sewer backup. In many parts of Canada water systems are vulnerable, as ageing storm and sanitary sewer infrastructure, stemming from a "significant long-term deficit in infrastructure improvement" often results in infrastructure incapacities to handle the "new, higher levels of precipitation."

Gail Krantzberg, Professor and Director, Dofasco Centre for Engineering and Public Policy, McMaster University and United Nations University (UNU), argued that, "Our water infrastructure is becoming crippled, some would argue is severely crippled, and our institutions are not making the investments that we need in the face of demographic growth and the projections of climate change impacts on the hydrologic cycle." She explains that soft engineering, like reducing the amount of paving is not enough given the fundamental problem of old infrastructure inadequate in the face of storms that caused flooding in Calgary and Toronto in June and July 2013.

== See also ==
- List of floods
