= Mount Barbour =

Mountain in the country of Canada

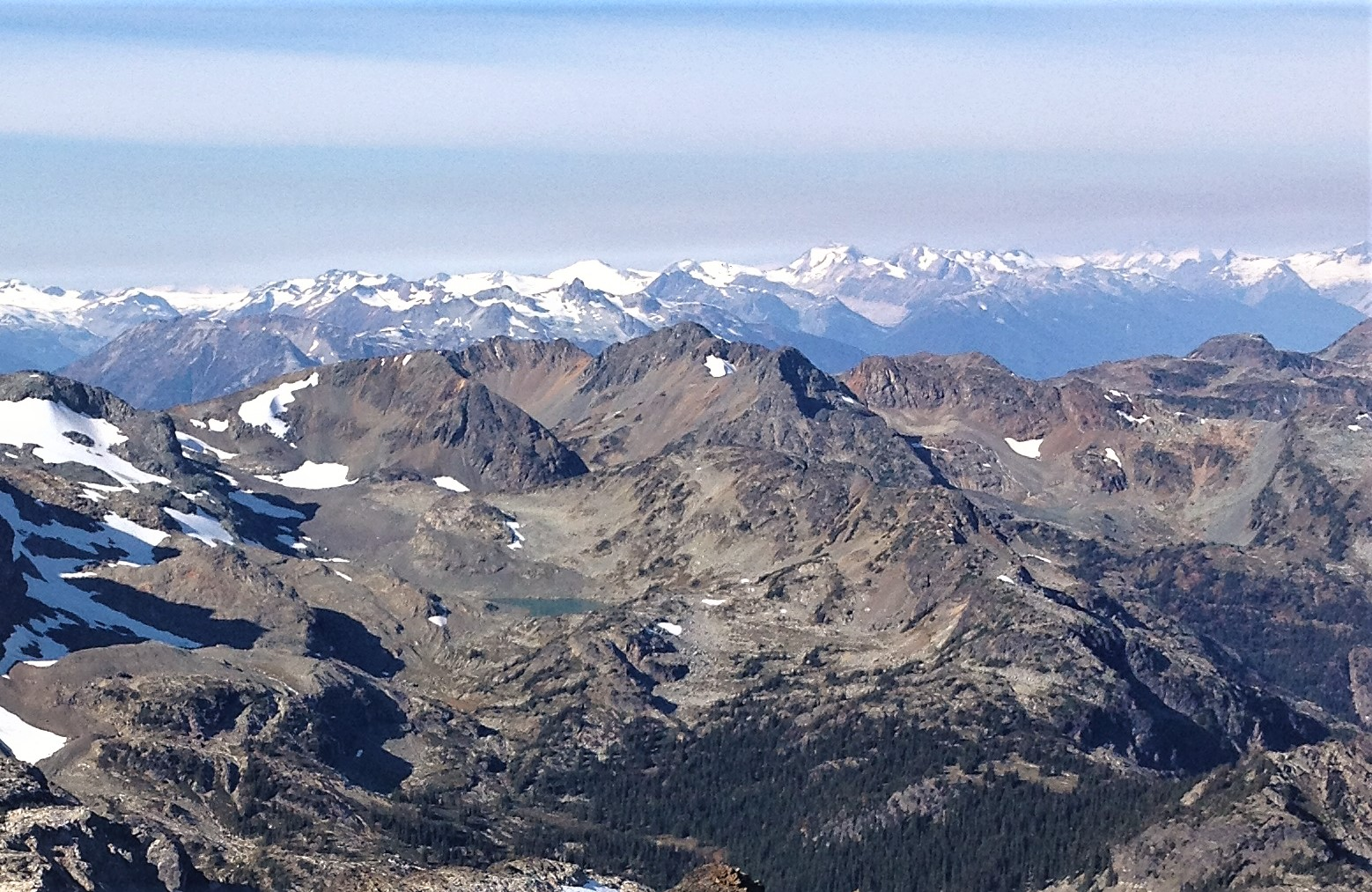
- East aspect, centered

Highest point
- Elevation: 2,290 m (7,513 ft)
- Prominence: 270 m (886 ft)
- Parent peak: Seven O'clock Mountain (2,341 m)
- Isolation: 2.89 km (1.80 mi)
- Listing: Mountains of British Columbia
- Coordinates: 50°30′22″N 122°53′23″W

Naming
- Etymology: Charles Barbour

Geography
- Location within British Columbia Location within Canada
- Interactive map of Mount Barbour
- Country: Canada
- Province: British Columbia
- District: Lillooet Land District
- Parent range: Coast Mountains
- Topo map: NTS 92J10 Birkenhead Lake

Climbing
- Easiest route: Scrambling

Mount Barbour is a 2,290-metre (7,513-foot) summit located in the Pemberton Valley of British Columbia, Canada.

== Description ==
Mount Barbour is situated in the Coast Mountains, 22.5 km (14 mi) north of Pemberton and 2.9 km (2 mi) northwest of Seven O'clock Mountain, the nearest higher neighbor. Precipitation runoff and glacial meltwater from the mountain's north slope drains into Tenquille Creek and the south slope drains to Owl Creek, both of which are tributaries of the Birkenhead River, whereas the west slope drains to the Lillooet River via Gingerbread Creek. Mount Barbour is more notable for its steep rise above local terrain than for its absolute elevation as topographic relief is significant with the summit rising 2,050 meters (6,725 ft) above the Lillooet River in 4 km (2.5 mi).

== Etymology ==
The mountain is named after Charles Barbour (died July 1, 1940), Pemberton pioneer and partner with Alex McLeod in development of the Gold King and Crown groups of mining claims south of Tenquille Creek during the pre-World War I era. The correct spelling of mountain's toponym was officially adopted November 17, 1981, by the Geographical Names Board of Canada. The toponym had been misspelled "Barber" going back to 1916.

== Climate ==
Based on the Köppen climate classification, Mount Barbour is located in a subarctic climate zone of western North America. Most weather fronts originate in the Pacific Ocean, and travel east toward the Coast Mountains where they are forced upward by the range (Orographic lift), causing them to drop their moisture in the form of rain or snowfall. As a result, the Coast Mountains experience high precipitation, especially during the winter months in the form of snowfall. Winter temperatures can drop below −20 °C with wind chill factors below −30 °C. This climate supports a small glacier remnant on the north slope. The months July through September offer the most favorable weather for climbing Mount Barbour.

== See also ==
- Geography of British Columbia
