= Seven O'clock Mountain =

Mountain in British Columbia, Canada

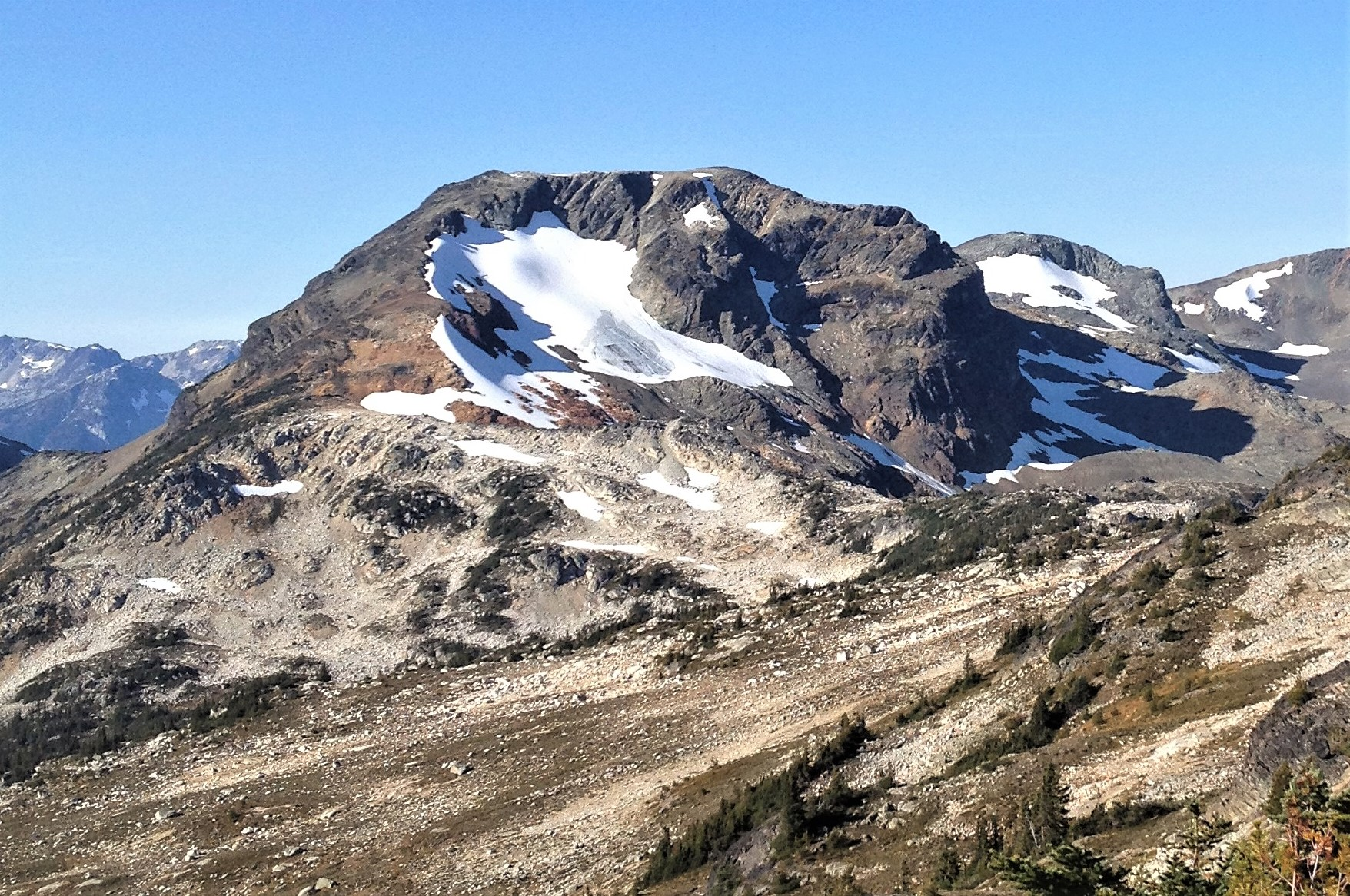
- East aspect

Highest point
- Elevation: 2,341 m (7,680 ft)
- Prominence: 336 m (1,102 ft)
- Parent peak: Sun God Mountain (2,421 m)
- Isolation: 3.75 km (2.33 mi)
- Listing: Mountains of British Columbia
- Coordinates: 50°29′39″N 122°51′12″W

Geography
- Location within British Columbia Location within Canada
- Interactive map of Seven O'clock Mountain
- Location: British Columbia, Canada
- District: Lillooet Land District
- Parent range: Coast Mountains
- Topo map: NTS 92J7 Pemberton

Climbing
- Easiest route: Scrambling

Seven O'clock Mountain is a 2,341-metre (7,680-foot) summit located near the Pemberton Valley of British Columbia, Canada.

== Description ==
Seven O'clock Mountain is situated in the Coast Mountains, 20 km (12 mi) north of Pemberton and 3.85 km (2 mi) west-southwest of line parent Sun God Mountain. Precipitation runoff and glacial meltwater from the mountain's north slope drains to Cerulean Lake thence Tenquille Creek; from the southeast slope to Tenas Creek; and from the southwest slope to Ogre Lake thence Owl Creek. All three creeks are tributaries of the Birkenhead River. Seven O'clock Mountain is more notable for its steep rise above local terrain than for its absolute elevation as topographic relief is significant with the summit rising 2,100 meters (6,890 ft) above the Lillooet River in 6 km (3.7 mi). The mountain's toponym was officially adopted January 23, 1979, by the Geographical Names Board of Canada.

== Climate ==
Based on the Köppen climate classification, Seven O'clock Mountain is located in a subarctic climate zone of western North America. Most weather fronts originate in the Pacific Ocean, and travel east toward the Coast Mountains where they are forced upward by the range (Orographic lift), causing them to drop their moisture in the form of rain or snowfall. As a result, the Coast Mountains experience high precipitation, especially during the winter months in the form of snowfall. Winter temperatures can drop below −20 °C with wind chill factors below −30 °C. This climate supports remnants of the Bluevault Glacier on the north slope. The months July through September offer the most favorable weather for climbing Seven O'clock Mountain.

== Gallery ==
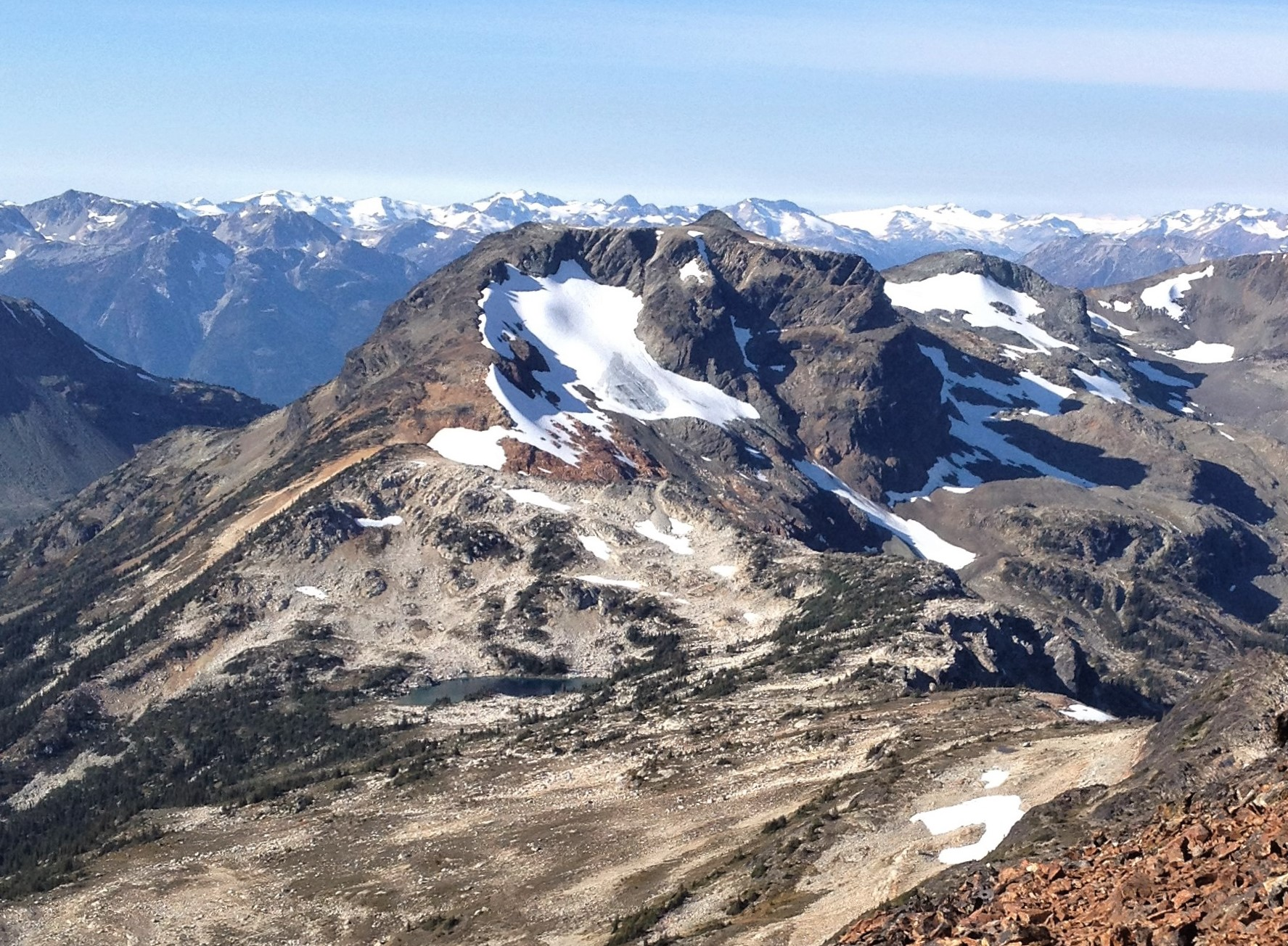
Seven O'clock Mountain from Sun God

== See also ==
- Geography of British Columbia
