= Nairn Falls Provincial Park =

Canadian park

- IUCN category II (national park)
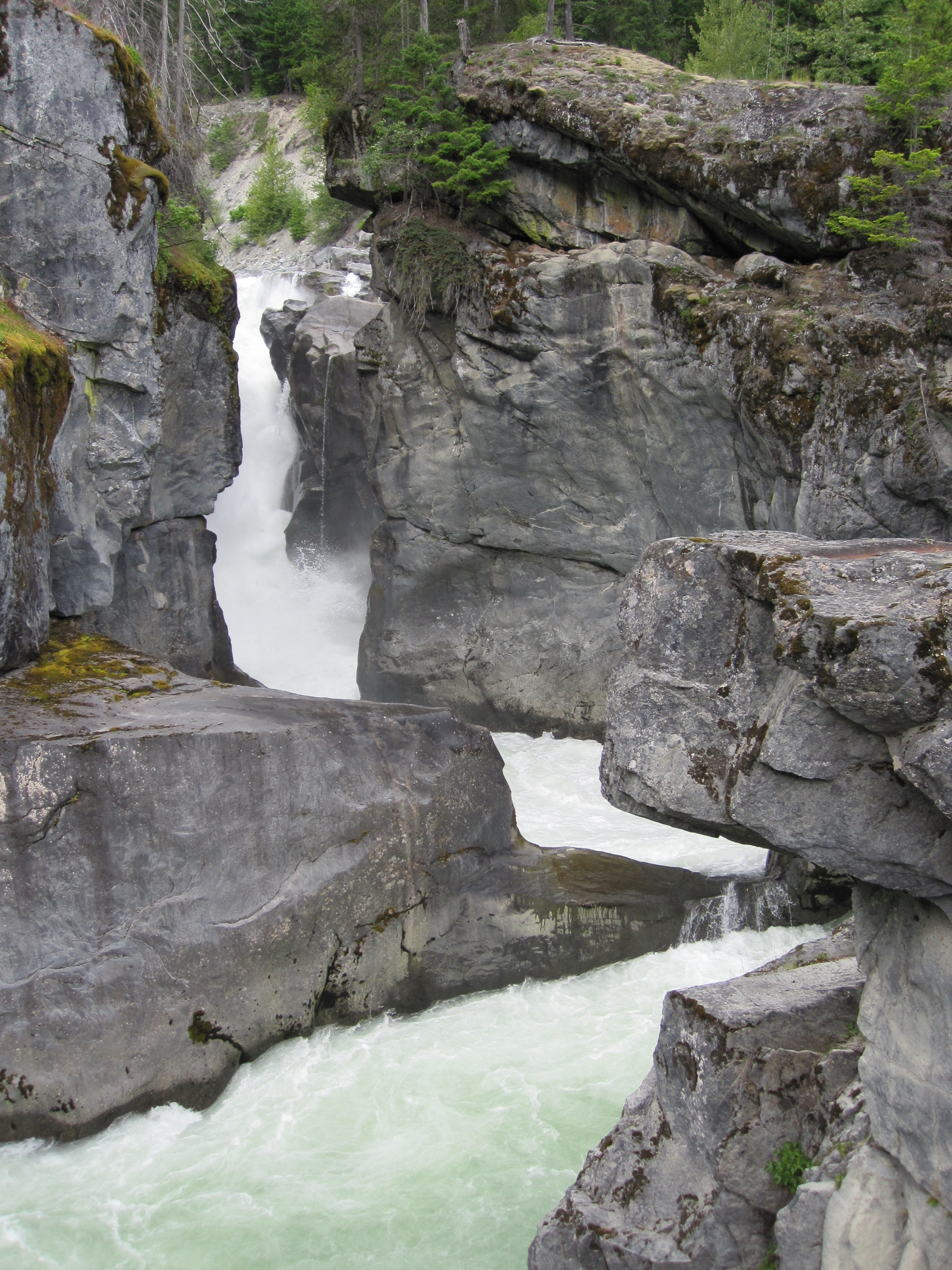
- Nairn Falls

- Location within British Columbia
- Interactive map of Nairn Falls Provincial Park
- Location: British Columbia, Canada
- Nearest city: Pemberton
- Coordinates: 50.29373°N 122.8189°W
- Area: 170 hectare
- Established: 4 April 1966
- Governing body: BC Parks
- Website: bcparks.ca/nairn-falls-park/

Nairn Falls Provincial Park (Lillooet: Skweskwistqw7am, [ʃkʷəʃkʷeʃtqʷʔɛm]) is a provincial park in British Columbia, Canada located on the Green River adjacent to British Columbia Highway 99 and the Canadian National Railway line just south of Pemberton and less than twenty minutes north of the resort town of Whistler. The 170 hectare park was established in 1966, shortly after the highway's opening, to protect and enhance visitor access to Nairn Falls.

== Nairn Falls ==
Nairn Falls is a tiered waterfall connected by a small canyon which throttles the flow of the Green River just before its accession to the lowlands of the Pemberton Valley and its confluence with the Lillooet River just above that river's estuary into Lillooet Lake. The waterfall measures 39.6 metres (130 ft) tall and has an average width of 9.1 metres (30 ft).

== Facilities ==
The park's campground, located in forest land near the falls, has 94 vehicle-accessible sites and is open from May to October.

== See also ==
- List of waterfalls
- List of waterfalls of Canada
- List of waterfalls in British Columbia
