= Pemberton Regional Airport =

Airport in British Columbia, Canada

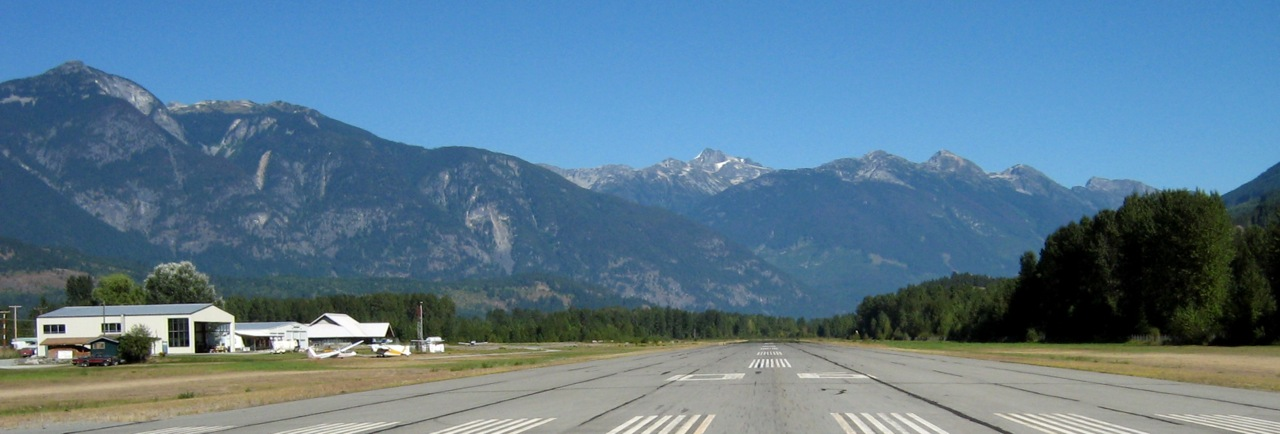
- Pemberton airstrip
- IATA: none; ICAO: CYPS

Summary
- Airport type: Public
- Operator: Village of Pemberton
- Location: Pemberton, British Columbia
- Time zone: PST (UTC−08:00)
  - Summer (DST): PDT (UTC−07:00)
- Elevation AMSL: 670 ft / 204 m
- Coordinates: 50°18′09″N 122°44′16″W
- Website: www.pemberton.ca/municipal-services/pemberton-regional-airport

Map
- Location in British Columbia

Runways
Direction	Length		Surface
Direction	ft	m	Surface
06/24	3,917	1,194	Asphalt
- Source: Canada Flight Supplement

Pemberton Regional Airport (ICAO: CYPS) is a registered aerodrome located 5 nautical miles (9.3 km; 5.8 mi) south southeast of Pemberton, British Columbia, Canada. Canadians and a few US pilots practiced landing here to train for Kandahar, Afghanistan.

== Facilities ==
There was an automatic weather station but is currently out of service, there are no lights, towers or navigational assistance. The runway is not always plowed in winter. There is Jet A fuel and 100LL accessible 24/7 via a card lock system facilitated by Blackcomb Aviation. Nav Canada has an active webcam broadcast on the AWWS website.

== Pemberton Regional Airport Authority ==
Began by the Pemberton Flying Club circa 1970. Oral history states it was based on a post war "back of the envelope" design by Boeing himself. The airport land was a Federal Crown Grant to the town in 1985. The Pemberton Airport Committee underwent several more incarnations before finally being incorporated under the British Columbia Society Act, in 2007 as Pemberton Regional Airport Authority or PRAA. As with all non-profit societies, all funds and/or profits must be used only for the society.

== Tenants and resident airlines ==
- Coast Range Heliskiing Ltd
- Blackcomb Aviation
- Tyax Adventures. Winter December–May – Ski plane: wheels and skis for landing on a hard surface runway or snow and ice.
- BCFS Fire Attack Base
