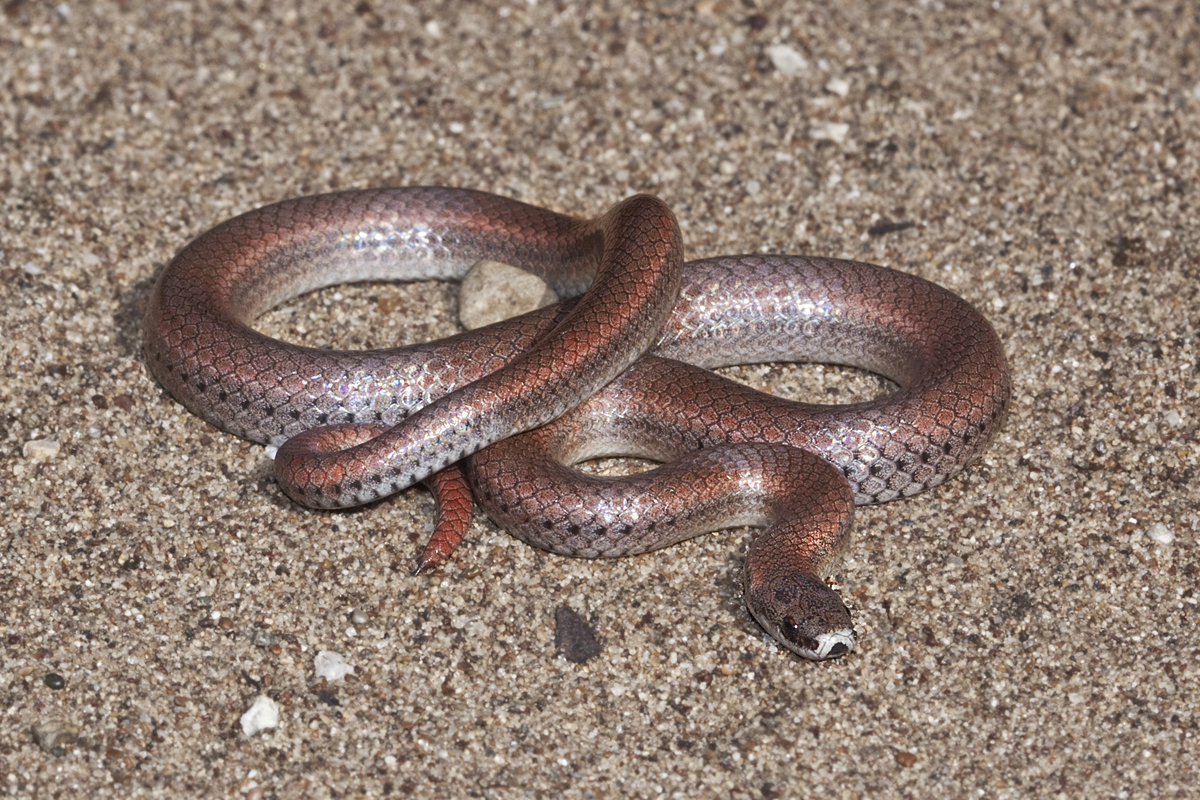

Conservation status
- Least Concern (IUCN 3.1)

- Secure (NatureServe)

Scientific classification
- Kingdom: Animalia
- Phylum: Chordata
- Class: Reptilia
- Order: Squamata
- Suborder: Serpentes
- Family: Colubridae
- Genus: Contia
- Species: C. tenuis

Binomial name
- Contia tenuis (Baird & Girard,1852)
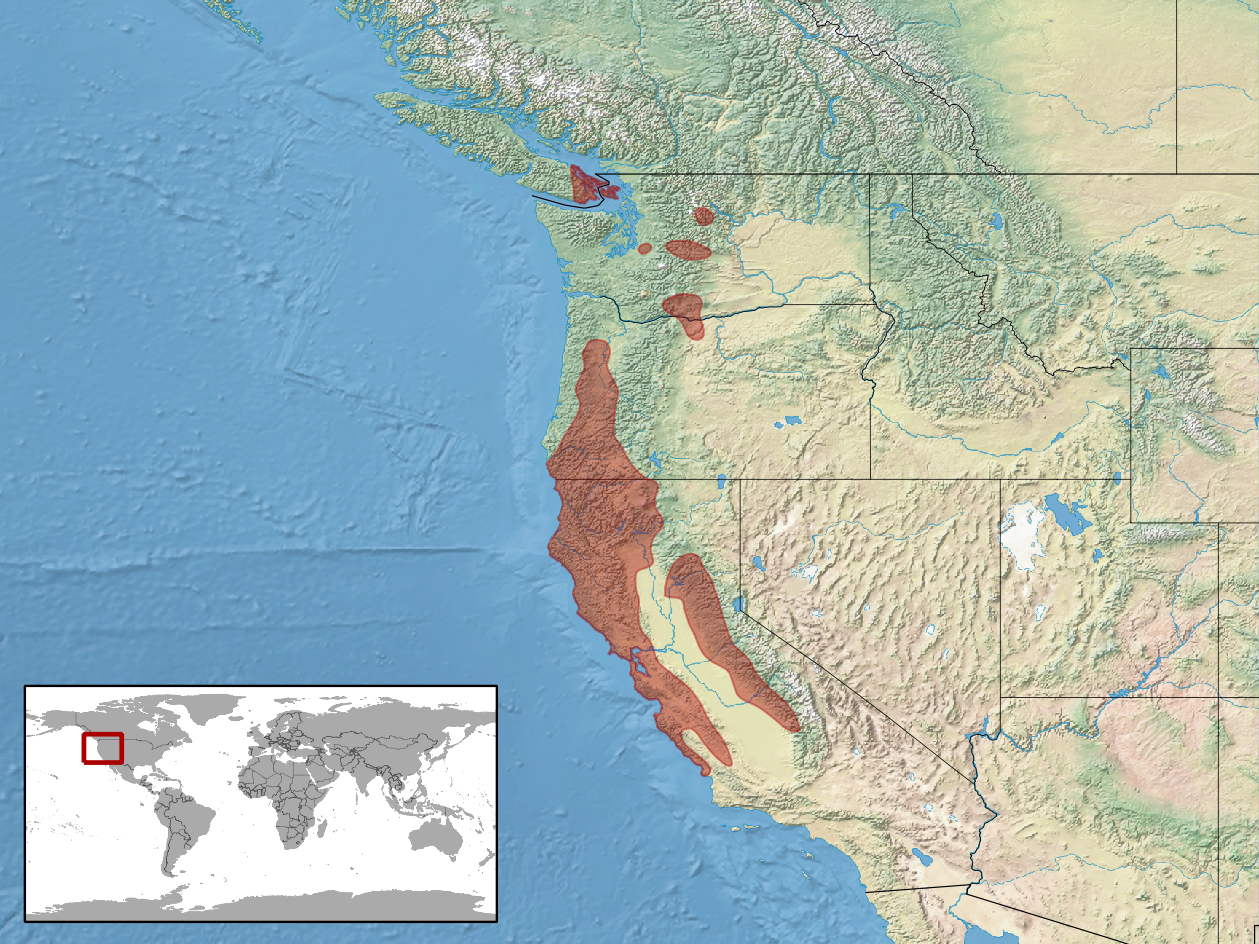

Synonyms
- Calamaria tenuis Baird & Girard, 1852; Contia mitis Baird & Girard, 1853; Ablabes purpureocauda Günther, 1858; Homolosoma mite — Jan, 1862; Lodia tenuis — Cope, 1898; Contia tenuis — Stejneger & Barbour, 1917

= Sharp-tailed snake =

Species of snake

The sharp-tailed snake or sharptail snake (Contia tenuis) is a small species of nonvenomous snake in the family Colubridae. The species is endemic to the Western United States and British Columbia.

== Common names ==
Additional common names for C. tenuis include brown snake, gentle brown snake, Oregon worm snake, Pacific brown snake, Pacific ground snake, and purple-tailed snake.

== Geographic range ==
C. tenuis is distributed through the states of California, Oregon, and Washington, as well as British Columbia, Canada: Southern Vancouver Island, British Columbia around Victoria, British Columbia, in Pemberton, British Columbia and newly discovered in 2026 on Lasqueti Island, British Columbia.

== Description ==
The sharp-tailed snake has an average total length (including tail) of 12–18 in (30–46 cm) as an adult. It is distinguished by its sharp tail spine, which is the protruding tip of the last tail vertebra. The spine is not toxic and cannot injure humans. Rather, the tail is used to stabilize small prey, such as slugs, for consumption. The dorsal surface ranges in color from grayish brown to brown to brick red, with bubble-gum pink and peachy-orange specimens occasionally found. The ventral surface is a striking series of black and white crossbars.

== Behavior ==
The sharp-tailed snake is a shy, secretive creature most often encountered under rocks and logs, and rarely to never found in the open. It is able to persist in urban areas where appropriate cover can be found. It is known to burrow into soft soil or cracks in the clay, and may be encountered by people who are digging in the garden or removing concrete. When encountered, the sharp-tailed snake may roll into a ball and remain still. It can be mistaken for a worm by the casual observer.

== Diet ==
The diet of C. tenuis is largely restricted to slugs and eggs of slugs. It sometimes also eats insects and earthworms.

== Reproduction ==
The adult female C. tenuis lays 4–16 eggs in the summer, underground or in a burrow. Each hatchling is 3–4 in (7.6–10.2 cm) in total length (including tail).

== See also ==
- Contia longicaudae commonly called the Forest sharp-tailed snake
