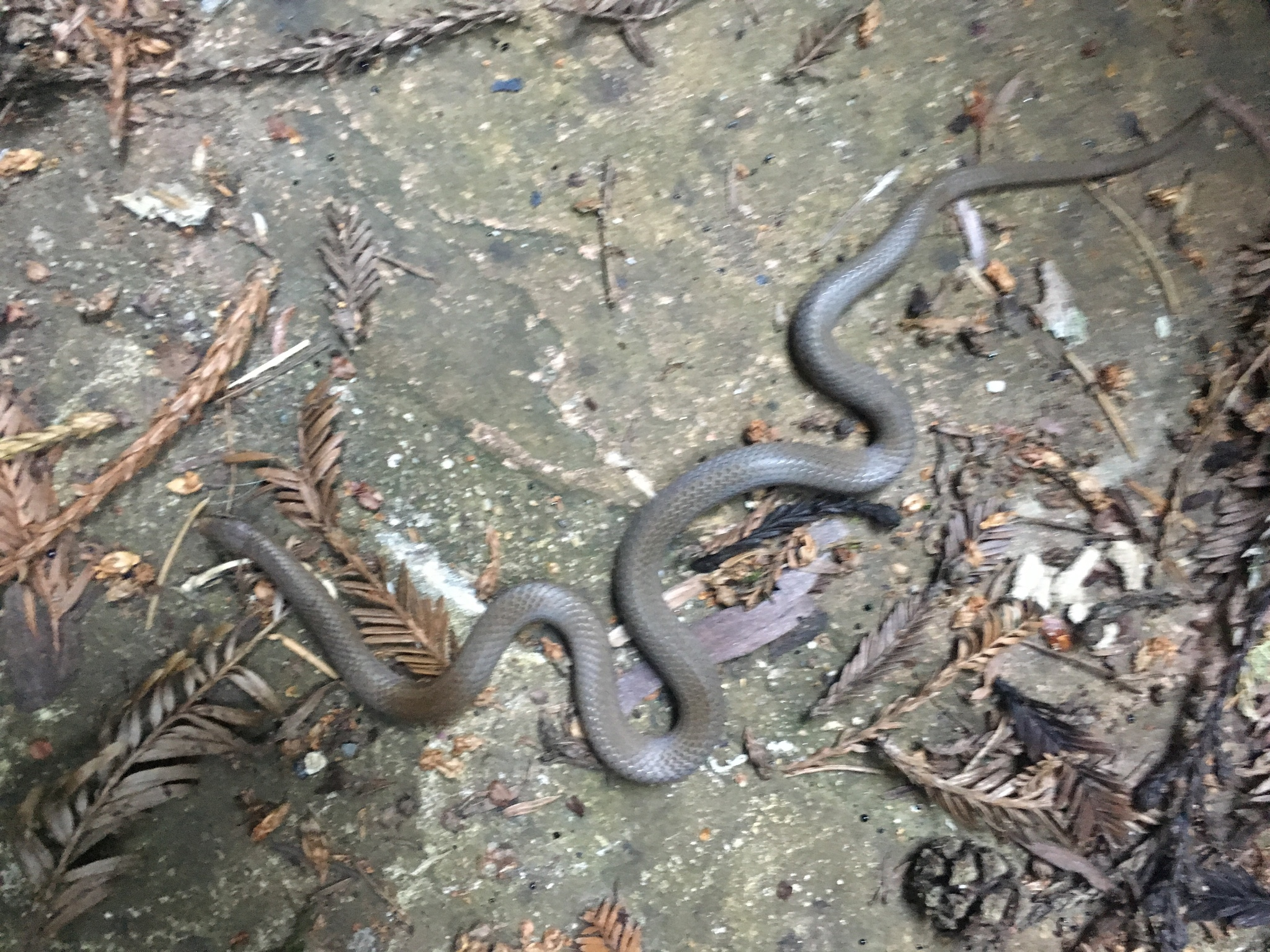

Conservation status
- Least Concern (IUCN 3.1)

- Apparently Secure (NatureServe)

Scientific classification
- Kingdom: Animalia
- Phylum: Chordata
- Class: Reptilia
- Order: Squamata
- Suborder: Serpentes
- Family: Colubridae
- Genus: Contia
- Species: C. longicauda

Binomial name
- Contia longicauda Feldman & Hoyer, 2010

Synonyms
- Contia longicaudae Feldman & Hoyer, 2010; Contia longicauda Crother et al., 2012; Contia longicauda Wallach et al., 2014

= Forest sharp-tailed snake =

Species of snake

The forest sharp-tailed snake (Contia longicaudae) is a species of snake in the family Colubridae. The species is endemic to the western coast of the United States.

== Geographic range ==
C. longicaudae is found in northern California and southern Oregon.

== Distribution and habitat ==
The forest sharp-tailed snake is not as widespread as its relative Contia tenuis (the sharp-tailed snake). The forest sharp-tailed snake is found in shaded wet forests along the western coast of the United States. The forest sharp-tailed snake went unnoticed for a long time due to its vast similarities to C. tenuis, the secretive nature of both species of sharp-tailed snakes, and their seasonally limited amount of activity.

== Identification ==
The easiest way to set the two species apart is by looking at the tail length and the subcaudal scales. The forest sharp-tailed snake has a longer tail than Contia tenuis and more subcaudal scales. Specifically, the forest sharp-tailed snake has 43 to 58 subcaudal scales, whereas Contia tenuis has 24 to 42.
