= Sun God Mountain =

Mountain in the country of Canada

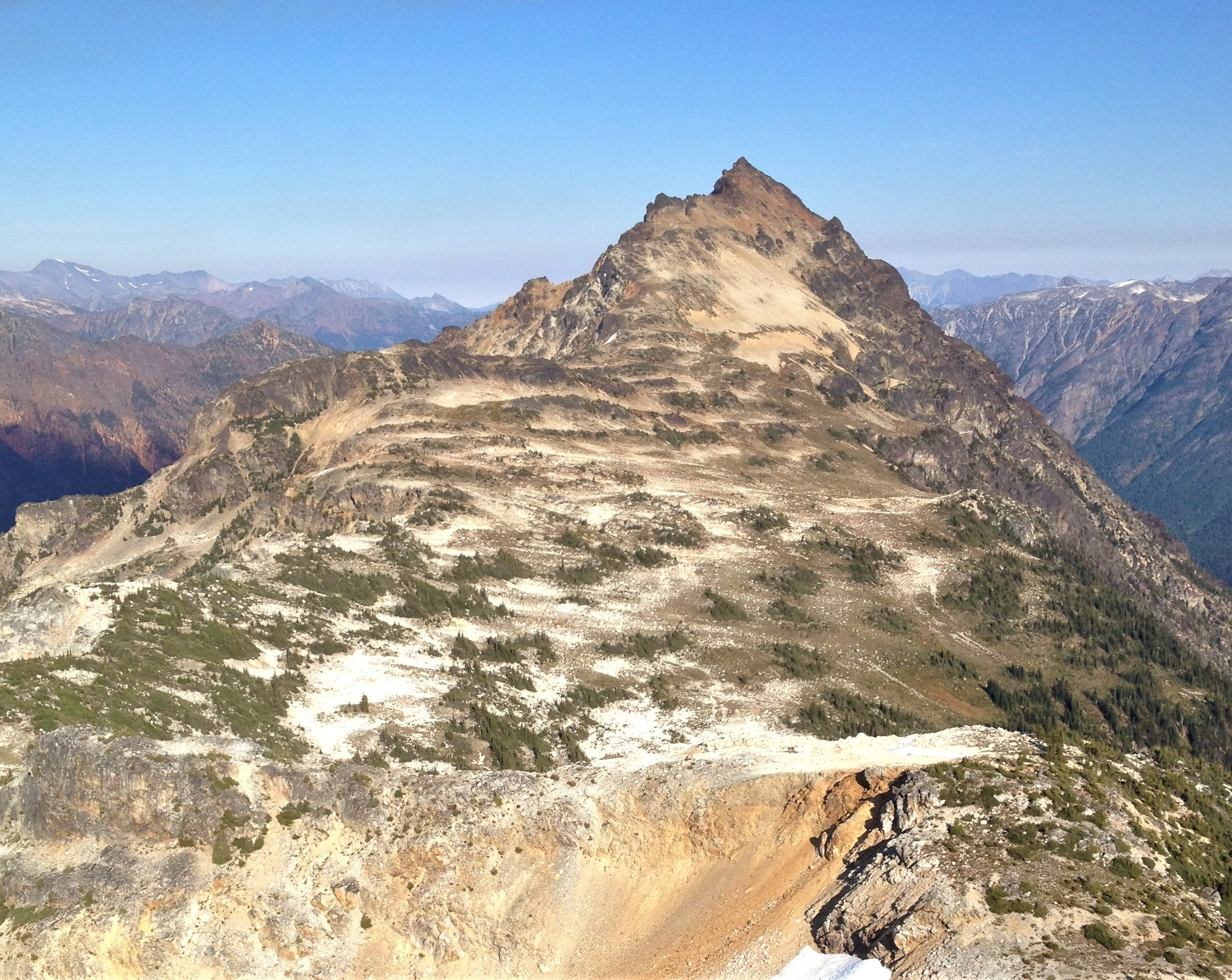
- West aspect

Highest point
- Elevation: 2,421 m (7,943 ft)
- Prominence: 711 m (2,333 ft)
- Parent peak: Whitecap Mountain
- Isolation: 11.23 km (6.98 mi)
- Listing: Mountains of British Columbia
- Coordinates: 50°30′19″N 122°48′07″W

Geography
- Location within British Columbia Location within Canada
- Interactive map of Sun God Mountain
- Location: British Columbia, Canada
- District: Lillooet Land District
- Parent range: Coast Mountains
- Topo map: NTS 92J10 Birkenhead Lake

Climbing
- First ascent: 1931
- Easiest route: Scrambling

Sun God Mountain is a 2,421-metre (7,943-foot) summit located in British Columbia, Canada.

== Description ==
Sun God Mountain is situated in the Coast Mountains, 20 km (12 mi) north of Pemberton and 6 km (4 mi) west of Birkenhead Lake. Precipitation runoff from the mountain's north slope drains into Tenquille Creek, and from the south slope to Tenas Creek, which are both tributaries of the Birkenhead River. Sun God Mountain is more notable for its steep rise above local terrain than for its absolute elevation as topographic relief is significant with the summit rising over 1,200 meters (3,937 ft) above Tenas Creek valley in 1.5 km (0.93 mi), and 1,700 meters (5,577 ft) above Birkenhead River in 4 km (2.5 mi).

== History ==
The first ascent of the summit was made in 1931 by Preston L. Tait and John Ronayne, members of the Vancouver Natural History Society summer camp. The mountain was named by Mrs. Walter C. Green of Pemberton Meadows, on account of the golden radiance of the sun reflected off the reddish slopes. The mountain's toponym and location were officially adopted December 31, 1970, by the Geographical Names Board of Canada.

== Climate ==
Based on the Köppen climate classification, Sun God is located in a subarctic climate zone of western North America. Most weather fronts originate in the Pacific Ocean, and travel east toward the Coast Mountains where they are forced upward by the range (Orographic lift), causing them to drop their moisture in the form of rain or snowfall. As a result, the Coast Mountains experience high precipitation, especially during the winter months in the form of snowfall. Winter temperatures can drop below −20 °C with wind chill factors below −30 °C. The months July through September offer the most favorable weather for climbing Sun God.

== See also ==
- Geography of British Columbia
