= Pemberton Festival =

2008 music festival in Canada

Coordinates: 50.32°N 122.782°W

- Genre: rock, indie rock, hip hop, electronic, heavy metal, pop
- Dates: July 25–27
- Locations: Pemberton, BC, Canada
- Years active: 2008
- Founders: Shane Bourbonnais

The Pemberton Festival was a three-day summer music festival inaugurated in 2008. It was held in Pemberton, British Columbia, a village just north of popular ski resort Whistler. Produced by Live Nation Canada, the festival featured primarily rock and indie rock musicians, with a small proportion of hip hop. Musicians played on one of two stages, picturesquely situated at the foot of Mount Currie and the surrounding mountain range. The site, a 400-acre (1.6 km^{2}) hayfield, was discovered by concert-promoter, Shane Bourbonnais, of Live Nation, just down the street from his home. He emphasized event sustainability and environmentalism as priorities in running the festival.

On January 8, 2009, Live Nation officially announced the cancellation of the 2009 event and instead, was going to focus on the planning of the 2010 comeback.

On January 19, 2010, Live Nation announced the cancellation of the 2010 event.

== Festival Site ==
The festival site was based on a large grass field located at the base of Mt. Currie which is over 8,300 feet (2,500 m) high.

=== Campgrounds ===
The campground was connected directly to the festival grounds and allowed people to travel to and from their campsites whenever they please.

=== Dance Tent ===
The B-Live dance tent sponsored by Bacardi featured one main stage, sitting areas, bars, and a large dance floor. DJ's playing mostly electronic dance music performed throughout the weekend. A custom live video remix wall and a thunderous sound system were also included.

Limited access to the tent that had a capacity limit of 2,500 was seen as a large drawback for many electronic music lovers at the festival.

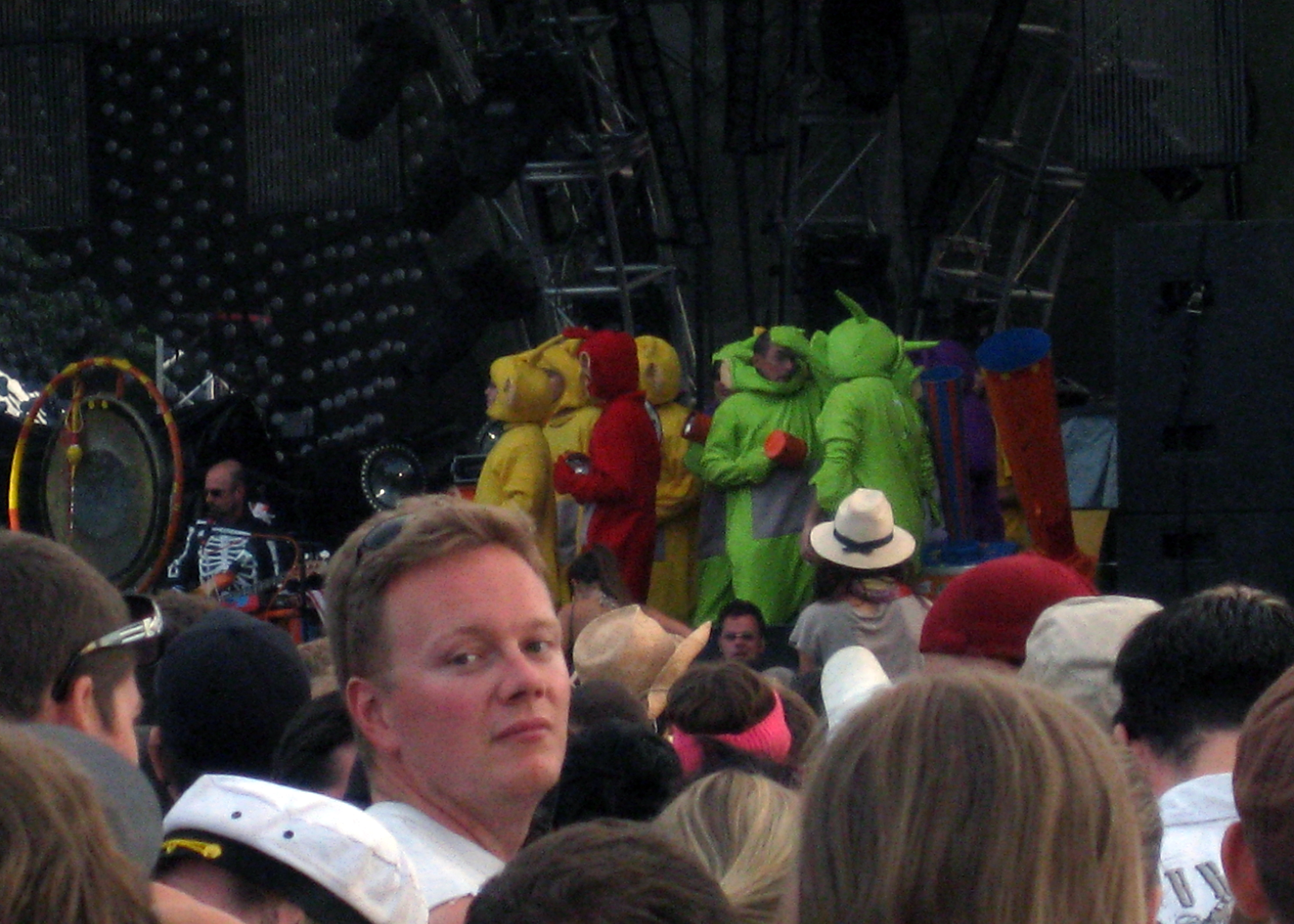
The Flaming Lips and Teletubbies at the festival

The festival's inaugural year, was held between July 25–27, 2008, and was headlined by Coldplay, Tom Petty and the Heartbreakers, Jay-Z, Nine Inch Nails, Tragically Hip, and the Flaming Lips.

At first, the festival was only available as a full three-day pass, thus, festival-goers were encouraged to camp out on the festival's camping grounds, while additional accommodation was available in the form of neighbouring hotels, inns and lodges. However, as of June 13, 2008, single day tickets were made available. In total, 40,000 people were expected for the first year of the festival.

The full line-up:

- Interpol
- Serj Tankian
- The Flaming Lips
- Coldplay
- Tom Petty and The Heartbreakers
- Death Cab for Cutie
- My Morning Jacket
- Jay Z
- The Tragically Hip
- Sam Roberts Band
- Metric
- Black Mountain
- Vampire Weekend
- The Crystal Method DJ Set
- DJ Shadow and Cut Chemist
- Booka Shade
- Junkie XL
- Dave Seaman
- Wintersleep
- Buck 65
- Secret Machines
- MSTRKRFT
- Deadmau5
- Brazilian Girls
- The Fiery Furnaces
- Mates of State
- Grand Ole Party
- Nine Inch Nails
- Carolina Liar
- Airborne Toxic Event
- Monte Negro
- Low Vs Diamond
- Annie Stela
- M.A.N.D.Y.
- Tommie Sunshine
- Chromeo
- 3OH!3
- Kevin Shiu
- Timeline
- Tony Pantages
- N.E.R.D.
- Minus the Bear
- Matisyahu
- Inward Eye
- Kathleen Edwards
- Wolfmother
- Shearwater
