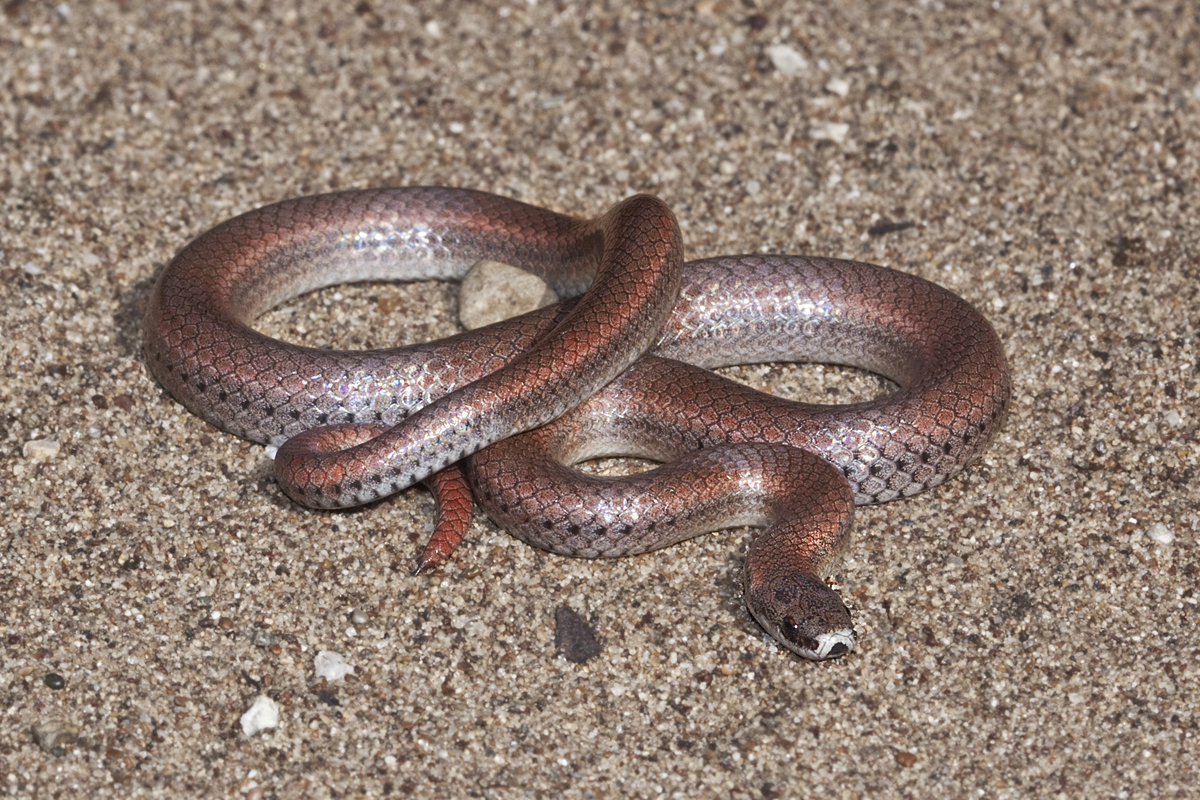
- Contia tenuis

Scientific classification
- Kingdom: Animalia
- Phylum: Chordata
- Class: Reptilia
- Order: Squamata
- Suborder: Serpentes
- Family: Colubridae
- Subfamily: Dipsadinae
- Genus: Contia; Baird and Girard, 1853

Type species
- Contia tenuis

= Contia (snake) =

Genus of snakes

Contia is a small genus of small snakes in the subfamily Dipsadinae of the family Colubridae. The genus is native to western North America.

== Etymology ==
The generic name, Contia, is in honor of American entomologist John Lawrence LeConte.

== Species ==
There are two species which are recognized as being valid.

Image	Scientific name	Common name	Distribution
	Contia longicaudae Feldman & Hoyer, 2010	forest sharp-tailed snake	northern California and southern Oregon
	Contia tenuis (Baird & Girard, 1852)	sharp-tailed snake	California, Oregon, and Washington, as well as British Columbia, Canada: Southern Vancouver Island, British Columbia around Victoria, British Columbia, and Pemberton, British Columbia
