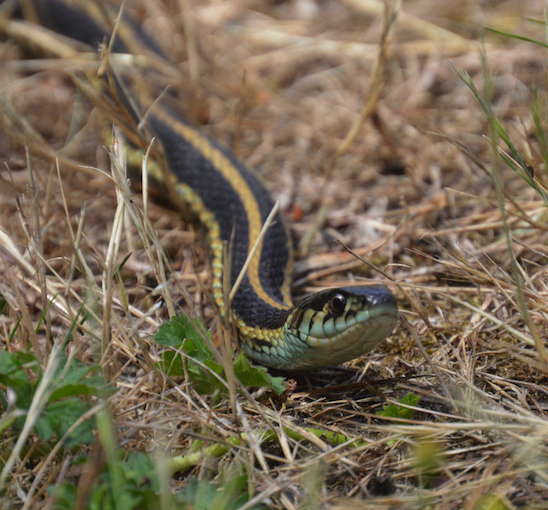

Conservation status
- Least Concern (IUCN 3.1)

Scientific classification
- Kingdom: Animalia
- Phylum: Chordata
- Class: Reptilia
- Order: Squamata
- Suborder: Serpentes
- Family: Colubridae
- Genus: Thamnophis
- Species: T. ordinoides

Binomial name
- Thamnophis ordinoides (Baird & Girard, 1852)

Synonyms
- Tropidonotus ordinoides Baird & Girard, 1852; Eutaenia ordinoides — Baird & Girard, 1853; Thamnophis ordinoides — Fitch, 1940

= Northwestern garter snake =

Species of snake

The northwestern garter snake (Thamnophis ordinoides) is a species of snake in the family Colubridae. The species is endemic to North America.

== Geographic range ==
In the United States, T. ordinoides is found in California, Oregon, and Washington; in Canada, it is found in British Columbia.

== Description ==
The northwestern garter snake is small, with adults averaging around 13–38 in (33–97 cm) in total length (including tail). Its color and scale patterns are varied and can include small dark spots. Common vertebral stripe colors are white, yellow, orange, red, green, turquoise, and blue.

== Habitat ==
The northwestern garter snake is primarily found on the edges of meadows surrounded by forest, as the species requires a fair amount of sunlight for its survival. In British Columbia it can also be commonly found near bodies of both freshwater and saltwater, where it hunts small fish and amphibians. In scenarios in which it is too hot outside, these snakes can also be found under stumps and rocks in order to shield themselves from the sunlight.

== Diet ==
T. ordinoides preys on slugs, salamanders, and frogs.
