= Gail Krantzberg =

Canadian Researcher

Gail Krantzberg is a professor emeritus, former lead of Engineering and Public Policy at McMaster University in Hamilton, Ontario, Canada. Her research has focused on plastic pollution and governance in the Great Lakes, and includes detecting COVID-19 in municipal water supplies. In 2001 she was selected to be the director of the International Joint Commission's Great Lakes Office in Windsor, Ontario, a post she held until 2005. In 2021, it was announced that she would co-chair the IJC's Science Priority Committee.
