= Pemberton Meadows =

- Location of Pemberton Meadows in BC
- Coordinates: 50°26′29″N 122°55′04″W
- Country: Canada
- Province: British Columbia
- Region: Lillooet Country
- Regional District: Squamish-Lillooet
- Area codes: 250, 236, 778

Pemberton Meadows is an unincorporated community on the west shore of the Lillooet River in the Squamish-Lillooet region of southwestern British Columbia. On Pemberton Meadows Road, the locality is by road about 170 kilometres (110 mi) north of Vancouver, 49 kilometres (30 mi) north of Whistler, and 17 kilometres (11 mi) northwest of Pemberton.

== Name origin ==
During the Fraser Canyon Gold Rush, miners en route named the farmlands north of Port Pemberton as Pemberton or Lillooet Meadows. This delineation as northeast of present day Pemberton, later refined to northwest of the town. Joseph Despard Pemberton, who was a surveyor for the Hudson's Bay Company and Surveyor-General for the Colony of Vancouver Island in the 1850s, probably never visited the area.

== Agriculture ==
Rumours that a railway line would possibly extend up the Pemberton Valley revived interest in farmland. In 1890, speculators bought and resold 1,800 hectares (4,500 acres), but few owners became residents. Carl Abraham Hartzell, who settled in 1891, is remembered for raising pigs, plowing with oxen, and eccentric behaviour. In a plea for better roading, he stated in 1901 that an acre could produce 680 kilograms (1,500 lb) of grain or 12 tons of potatoes. Farther northwestward, at about 28 kilometres (17 mi) from Pemberton, Duncan Morrison settled in 1897. Around 1904, preemptions were made by James Ryan on the local creek named after him and by Arthur Keirstead about 40 kilometres (25 mi) from Pemberton.

The Rockside, about 6 kilometres (4 mi) from Pemberton, was a natural obstacle. When Jack Ronayne and his brothers blasted a passage in 1906, their wagon was the first to reach the upper valley. At this time, James Punch settled locally.

Jack Ronayne also kept weather records for the government and was first to realize that the high livestock losses in the valley were due to goitre, which was treatable by administering iodine doses. Crops such as hay and potatoes, which had been grown mainly for local use, found new customers with the arrival of the Pacific Great Eastern Railway (PGE) construction crews in 1913. The establishment of the railway enabled crops, milk, and cream to be shipped out. Previously, sizeable farms were few. The formerly smaller subsistence operations soon planted greater acreages of wheat, oats and peas, and expanded dairy farming.

Founded in 1925, the Pemberton Valley Farmers Institute promoted advances in agriculture. Disease-free potato varieties became a speciality. During the 1930s, professionals from the Department of Agriculture were judging the exhibits at the fall fairs held at the Pemberton Meadows school.

In 1961, agriculture remained a principal activity in the general Pemberton area but had declined by the early 1980s. By the end of that decade, agriculture had all but disappeared as an employer.

The Pemberton Farmer's Institute continues to oversee the growing of certified virus-free seed potatoes.

The annual Slow Food Cycle Sunday is a 50-kilometre (31 mi) bicycle tour of Pemberton Meadows, which was founded in 2005 at Helmer's Organic Farm. This agri-tourism event provides cyclists with the opportunity to purchase or sample local produce at participating farms along the route.

Established in the Pemberton Valley in 2013, with the growing of Canada's first proprietary, patented hop called Sasquatch, Hops Connect expanded to multiple facilities and distribution centres to better serve the craft brewing industry across Canada.

== Forestry ==
Around 1905, the Perkins mill assisted many new settlers with materials for their homesteads. In 1907, Patrick G.Dermody arrived. He established a water-powered mill at the falls on Ryan Creek.

From the mid-1920s, logging and sawmill jobs were attracting new people. Mobile mills, powered by gasoline motors, were set up on farms. Pole and tie manufacturing rapidly expanded. Cut poles were dragged overland or rafted downriver to Mile 60 (east of Pemberton) for loading onto railway cars. In 1929, several flat-deck trucks were purchased to haul ties to the railway.

In 1950, Fleetwood Logging Co. introduced large scale logging. At a camp on the upper end of Lillooet Lake, the company hauled using A-frame logging structures supplemented by crawler tractors. Three loading yards existed near the train station.

By 1972, 100 logging trucks a day headed south from the timber leases in the upper Lillooet River region through to Squamish in the south. In 1973, the BC Forest Service built a new office in Pemberton, which closed and moved to Squamish in the 1990s.

In 1961, forestry was a principal activity in the general Pemberton area. By the early 1980s, forestry remained the largest employer. By 1991, only 13 per cent of total employment was in forestry.

== Community ==
On reopening, the post office relocated about 13 kilometres (8 mi) up the trail to Hartzell's property, who was postmaster 1904–1912. Damage from spring and fall floods and mosquito infestations shattered most dreams, causing many settlers to depart.

Christine Lanoville was the inaugural teacher when the Pemberton Meadows school opened in August 1915, but the schoolhouse was not completed until four months later. In 1929, a new school building was erected. In 1956, the replacement had two rooms, but the second room was used for only two years because enrolments declined.

Erected in 1925, the Boys' Club hall was as a venue for community dances. The upper valley hall, which replaced the former around 1932, collapsed under the weight of snow in the 1970s. In the 1930s, Joseph Prendergast opened a log cabin store with a barber's chair. He was the first licensed barber.

In 1951, the post office closed. That year, electricity came to the valley, which allowed movies to be shown in the Boys' Club hall. Jack Taillefer lived in Pemberton where he ran a garage. As the only electrician and plumber, wiring work in the valley became so plentiful that he sold the garage.

== Trails, roads, ferries, and bridges ==
The trail up the valley was in such poor condition in the early 1900s that Hartzell, Morrison, and others often used canoes. Prior to 1906, when the Ronayne brothers blasted the Rockslide, settlers to the northwest did not own wagons.

The approximate distances by road from Pemberton of the cross-river ferries were 5 kilometres (3.1 mi) for Dermody, 19 kilometres (12 mi) for Ronayne, and 25 kilometres (16 mi) for Crown Mountain. Dermody was an unspecified ferry, intermittently subsidized 1921–1933. Ronayne was a pontoon ferry, subsidized 1926–1934. Crown Mountain was a raft ferry, subsidized 1926–1945. These ferries likely operated for longer periods. The Ronayne one still existed in 1940. In the early 1950s, the capsizing of a raft ferry in which two occupants drowned may well have been the Crown Mountain one.

The gravelling and ditching of the valley road began in the early 1950s. About 2000, the road was paved.

== Floods ==
In 1912, government help was sought to address flooding. The blasting of river obstructions a few months later provided only partial relief.

In fall 1940, heavy rains breached inadequate dykes causing serious crop and livestock losses and property damage.

After years of petitioning, the Pemberton Dyking District was formed in 1947 to manage drainage and flood control in the Pemberton Valley. In a tri-partite agreement with federal and provincial governments, the organization dyked and straightened the Lillooet River lowering the level by 4.6 metres (15 ft). The project was carried out under the Prairie Farmer's Rehabilitation Act. The new land made available by the drainage project brought a rush of new settlers in the late 1940s–1950s. The project was only half completed before the 1948 floods, which inundated the lower valley farms.

The ongoing drainage program made abandoned farms viable and created new farmland from swamps.

In 1984, the next most significant flood caused extensive damage. In 2003, flooding impacted the southern end of the valley.

The flood risk from the Lillooet River was increased by the 2010 Capricorn Creek landslide, the largest in recorded Canadian history. The resulting sediment moving downstream has made the river shallower, reducing flow capacity and increasing vulnerability to floods.

== Notable persons ==
- George Clark Miller, politician, was a resident in 1919.
