= Pemberton, British Columbia =

Pemberton
- Village
- Village of Pemberton
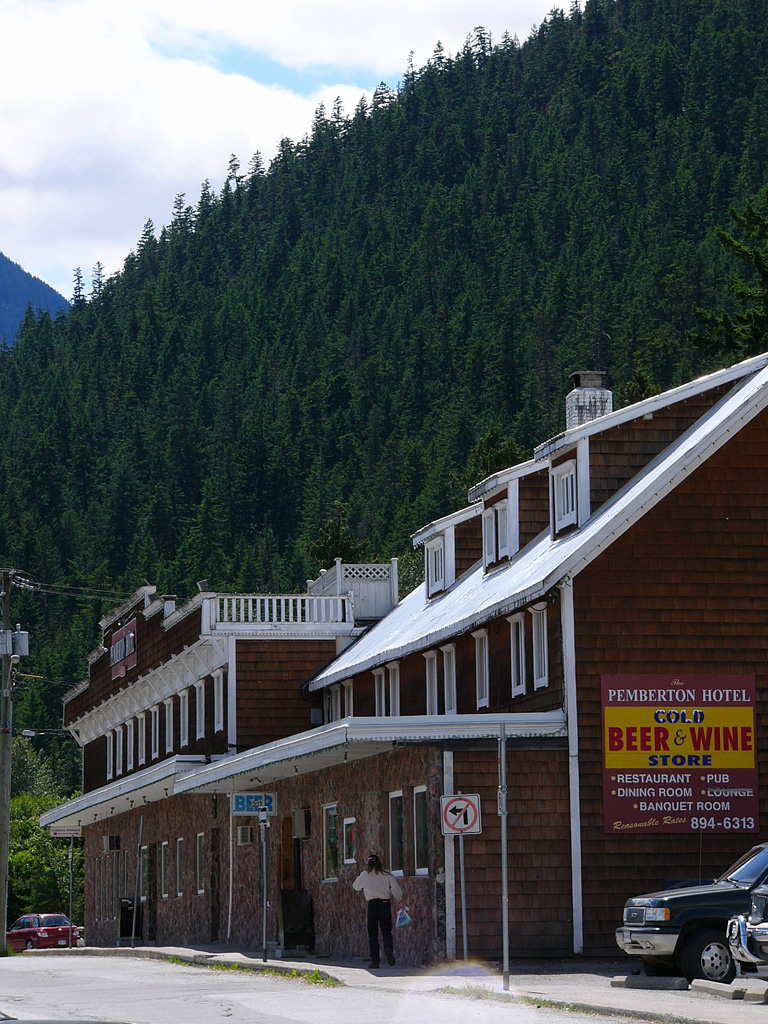

- Location of Pemberton in British Columbia
- Coordinates: 50°19′13″N 122°48′27″W
- Country: Canada
- Province: British Columbia
- Region: Pemberton Valley (Sea to Sky Country/Lillooet Country)
- Regional district: Squamish-Lillooet
- Incorporated: 1956

Government
  - Type: Elected village council
  - Governing body: Pemberton Village Council
  - Mayor: Mike Richman

Area
  - Total: 10.89 km^{2} (4.20 sq mi)
- Elevation: 210 m (690 ft)

Population (2021)
  - Total: 3,407
  - Density: 217.5/km^{2} (563/sq mi)
- Time zone: UTC−07:00 (PT)
- Postal code: V0N
- Area code: 604 / 778 / 236
- Highways: Highway 99
- Website: Official website

Pemberton is a village municipality in the Squamish-Lillooet region of southwestern British Columbia. This Pemberton Valley community is on the southwest shore of the Lillooet River and northeast shore of Pemberton Creek. On BC Highway 99, the locality is by road about 153 kilometres (95 mi) north of Vancouver, 33 kilometres (21 mi) northeast of Whistler, and 100 kilometres (62 mi) southwest of Lillooet.

== First Nations ==
The valley lies in the unceded traditional territory of the Lil'wat First Nation, who have resided for thousands of years, but are now concentrated at Mount Currie. During the hunting season, the people journeyed into the headwaters of the Lillooet River. The absence of trails indicates travel was mostly by canoe. Indigenous farmers introduced potato growing to the area, having received seed potatoes either from passing early traders or from visiting the Lower Mainland.

== Early European exploration ==
Hudson's Bay Company (HBC) employees were among the first outsiders to venture into the valleys of the Birkenhead River and Lillooet River. In 1827, Francis Ermatinger came from the northeast via Seton Lake and Anderson Lake. Three years later, James Murray Yale arrived from the south. Their likely objective was to discover a feasible route between Kamloops and Fort Langley that bypassed the dangerous waters of the lower Fraser Canyon. The need became more critical when the HBC lost the main access to the Interior via the lower Columbia River after the Oregon Treaty transpired. To determine a new route suitable for horse travel, which connected the Fraser with present-day Mount Currie, Alexander Caulfield Anderson journeyed by way of Lillooet Lake and Harrison Lake in 1846.

== Port Pemberton ==
The Douglas Road, which conveyed miners and supplies, was a trail upgraded in 1858 during the Fraser Canyon Gold Rush. The now ghost town of Port Pemberton, at the head of Lillooet Lake and the hub of this trail, comprised about six restaurants and six huts. Hemmed in by steep bluffs and large differences between high and low water on the lake, the unsuitable site is about 17 kilometres (11 mi) by road east of present-day Pemberton. South of the port, Drinkall's Pemberton House provided lodgings and Otis Parsons (later of Parsonville) ran a general store.

Completed in 1864, the shorter Cariboo Road, which connected Yale to Barkerville via Ashcroft, ended most traffic on the Douglas Road. Consequently, most settlers abandoned the Pemberton area. The port and general area were named for Joseph Despard Pemberton, a surveyor for the Hudson's Bay Company and Surveyor-General for the Colony of Vancouver Island in the 1850s. Joseph Pemberton probably never visited the area. By 1874, only a few settlers remained and the indigenous people had returned to their traditional ways. By 1882, only one name appeared on the voters' list. Pemberton House was abandoned in the mid-1890s.

== Agriculture ==
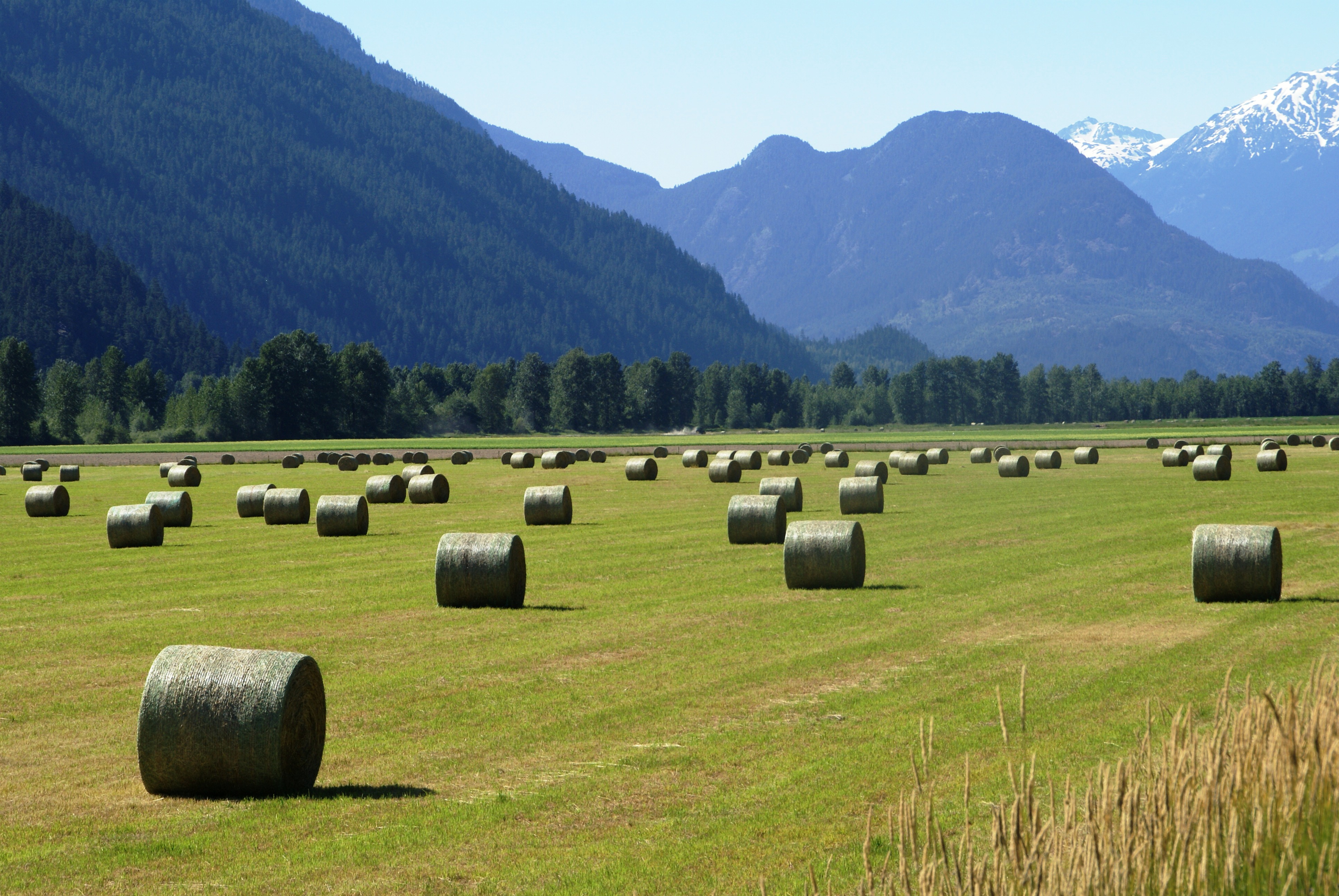
Haybales in a sunny field

This section outlines agriculture south of the mouth of Ryan Creek. Pemberton Meadows includes north of this point.

John Currie, whose spouse was indigenous, was listed as a permanent resident by 1885, having significant landholdings with partners Dugald McDonald and Owen Williams. In 1888, Currie and McDonald pre-empted two 65-hectare (160-acre) lots which included present day northern Pemberton. McDonald left in 1890.

John Currie was also the inaugural Pemberton Meadows postmaster from 1895 to 1901. Unlike the later definition, Pemberton Meadows then included the current Pemberton. The general store/post office was housed in a log building on his farm, which was immediately northwest of Pemberton. Mail travelled via Lillooet. After a few years, the post office reopened at the later defined Pemberton Meadows.

In 1895, Will Miller preempted about 5 kilometres (3 mi) northwest, adjacent to what would become Miller Creek. Acquiring further land with his brother Bob, they sold out to the Howe Sound, Pemberton Valley & Northern Railway (HSPV&N) in 1912. Pettit, who had pre-empted immediately east of Pemberton, sold land to Charles Barbour in the early 1900s.

The Currie household also provided meals and lodgings, a practice continued by Leonard Neill, the beef farmer who bought the property in 1903.

== Early community ==
In the early 1900s. John McKenzie opened a store on the Barbour land. A small lake a few miles to the north bears his name.

In the 1910s, the Pemberton Trading Co (PTC) bought the store, engaging J. Frank Brokaw as the manager. Brokaw was the inaugural Agerton postmaster from 1912 to 1915. The origin for the Agerton name is unclear. One possibility is the Latin "ager" meaning field, another is an abbreviation for "a great town". The post office location was not far from the former Currie ranch, where the Pemberton Meadows post office had closed a decade earlier. However, the store soon moved closer to the proposed HSPV&N train station (which was never built at that location).

Bob McLauchlan operated the first Pemberton Hotel for a few years before rebuilding in 1914 near the station. Decades later, this structure became the first unit of the Pemberton Motor Hotel. By the late 1920s, the hotel offered limited interior plumbing. The wife of William Tuck, the Pacific Great Eastern Railway (PGE) roadmaster, was the proprietor. The dining room also served train passengers and later received a liquor licence. The business passed through several hands over a short period. Although World War I enlistments temporarily reduced the population, the presence of the railway attracted many new families.

Whereas the PTC store was about a mile from the built train station, Charles Wellington opened a store with upstairs accommodation around 1914 by the station. In 1915, William C. Kiltz took over at the PTC. About 1923, he left to establish the first Creekside store. Joseph Taillefer, who had joined the staff around 1920, became the PTC store manager. Their boarding house next door had six upstairs bedrooms. About 1930, the PTC relocated closer to the station, with upstairs accommodation for the storekeeper.

About 1931, the Pemberton community hall was erected, which hosted the Pemberton community dances instead of the more distant Boys' Club hall at Pemberton Meadows. That year, the Pemberton and District Board of Trade was formed, and the Agerton post office was renamed Pemberton. In 1934, the PTC store burned to the ground when gasoline from a lamp dripped onto a newly waxed upstairs floor. The store safe and some goods were saved. After temporarily operating from the community hall, Wellington's store was bought to become known as Taillefer's store.

For decades, the train station possessed the only phone. By the 1940s, Taillefer's store had a phone served by the provincial government network which operated across the railway transmission lines.

The Pemberton and District Co-operative Association, founded in 1941, primarily maintained a warehouse adjacent to the railway for shipping potatoes but also operated a small store managed by Mrs Prendergast. During the 1940s, the main street included the community hall, Bob Taylor's garage, Taillefer's store, the hotel, Prendergast's store, and Jack Taillefer's garage. Taylor ran the Pemberton Express (PX), which delivered express parcels, general freight, private mail, and groceries. He provided taxi, car rental, and produce haulage services. Also, he sold gasoline, farm machinery, and real estate. Warren Taillefer's store carried a wide variety of goods compared to Prendergast's small store in a log cabin, which closed by 1948. In the 1950s, the Prendergast building became Wendell and Grethyll Watson's café.

In 1951, the completion of the Bridge River Power Project brought electricity to Pemberton. In 1953, the British Columbia Telephone Co. installed party lines connected through the Squamish exchange. In 1958, an automatic telephone exchange opened at Pemberton. The village was incorporated in 1956.

Brotherston and McNally bought Jack Taillefer's garage and Ford agency in 1952, but the building became the first drugstore in 1964. In 1956, the Pemberton and District Credit union was established, and two years later, the Bank of Nova Scotia opened twice weekly. In 1957, Warren's (Taillefer) department store split into separate grocery and hardware stores. The latter opened a laundromat in 1964.

An RCMP detachment formed in 1961.

== Railway ==
In 1873, a route via the Pemberton area was an option surveyed, but rejected, for the proposed Canadian transcontinental railway.

By 1909, the HSPV&N Railway had bought the Neill ranch and Miller land. By 1911, the company owned 1,190 hectares (2,930 acres) around Pemberton. The HSPV&N planned townsites adjacent to the Squamish and Agerton settlements, naming the former as Newport. The prior Neill land was subdivided into 74 lots ranging from 2 to 4 hectares (5 to 10 acres). The former Miller land was divided into larger acreages. After the company floundered, Foley, Welch and Stewart agreed in 1912 to build the line under the title of the Pacific Great Eastern Railway (PGE).

In February 1914, PGE renamed Newport as Squamish. The rail head reached the Pemberton area in early October 1914. When the first train from Squamish reached Pemberton later that month, passengers alighted onto a roughly hewn temporary platform, and a weekly mail service began.

During the decades of passenger travel, Pemberton was a regular stop. Tisdall station 7.1 kilometres (4.4 mi) to the southwest also opened in 1914, but existed intermittently over the years. Eastward links existed to Mount Currie and beyond. A water tower stood during the steam train era.

The first reference using the expression Pemberton station was 1919. The precise date the station name officially changed from Agerton is unclear, but was definitely the case by 1922.

About 1932, a steel structure replaced the wooden trestle bridge over the Lillooet River. A wye existed at the southern end of the station.

Later construction projects were a station agent house in 1958 and a new station in 1962.

The withdrawal of the Cariboo Prospector in October 2002 ended passenger train service.

== Trails, roads, ferries, and bridges ==
The Lillooet Cattle Trail, built via Pemberton in 1877, rendered limited benefit in relation to its cost. Maintained for four years, the trail slowly fell into disrepair. In 1891, rehabilitation was carried out, but the route remained unpopular. Bob Miller built the first wagon road in Pemberton.

In 1909, the Red Bridge was erected north of the later PGE bridge. During 1914 and 1915, a 10-kilometre (6 mi) road was built from the eastern end along the north bank of the Lillooet River to Mount Currie. Formerly, travel was only possible during low water along the south bank.

In 1922, two 30-metre (100 ft) howe trusses were replaced over the Lillooet, one being the Red Bridge.

A Pemberton ferry was subsidized from 1926 to 1935 but may well have operated for a longer period. The location is unclear, but may have been over the Green River.

By 1953, a gravel road across former swampland replaced the old narrow dirt road to Mount Currie, which had included three unguarded railway crossings. A wider bridge over the Lillooet opened that year. Until 1958, no road existed between Pemberton and Bridge River. In earlier times, produce was transported to the mines by packhorse. In addition, the Pemberton Portage Road has provided a northward link. Paving of the Duffy Lake Road (Highway 99) to Lillooet was completed in 1991. The narrow Squamish to Whistler gravel road built in the early 1960s was extended to Pemberton in 1964. This road was paved in 1969 as far Mount Currie.

== Forestry ==
First Nations were the first loggers. During the Fraser Canyon Gold Rush, timber was felled to build bridges and boats. Pemberton Meadows includes a broad outline of logging and milling in the area.

In 1938, a BC Forest Service ranger cabin was built close to the railway.

In 1971, Evans products established a sawmill, creating 175 mill jobs and 125 logging ones. During its short lived presence, the wellbeing of the community was enhanced.

== Demographics ==
Census population: Pemberton
Year	Pop.	±%
1961	181	—
1966	172	−5.0%
1971	157	−8.7%
1976	254	+61.8%
1981	282	+11.0%
1986	347	+23.0%
1991	502	+44.7%
1996*	857	+70.7%
2001*	1,642	+91.6%
2006	2,192	+33.5%
2011*	2,434	+11.0%
2016	2,574	+5.8%
2021	3,407	+32.4%
Source: Statistics Canada * Revised figure

In the 2021 Census of Population conducted by Statistics Canada, Pemberton had a population of 3,407 living in 1,357 of its 1,430 total private dwellings, a change of 32.4% from its 2016 population of 2,574. With a land area of 61.36 km^{2} (23.69 sq mi), it had a population density of 55.5/km^{2} (143.8/sq mi) in 2021.

=== Religion ===
According to the 2021 census, religious groups in Pemberton included:

- Irreligion (2,705 persons or 79.7%)
- Christianity (590 persons or 17.4%)
- Hinduism (15 persons or 0.4%)
- Sikhism (15 persons or 0.4%)
- Buddhism (10 persons or 0.3%)
- Judaism (10 persons or 0.3%)
- Other (45 persons or 1.3%)

=== Ethnicity ===
Panethnic groups in the Village of Pemberton (1986−2021)
Panethnic group	2021		2016		2006		2001		1996		1991		1986	
Panethnic group	Pop.	%	Pop.	%	Pop.	%	Pop.	%	Pop.	%	Pop.	%	Pop.	%
European (Note: Statistic includes all persons that did not make up part of a visible minority or an indigenous identity.)	2,985	87.92%	2,220	86.55%	1,995	90.89%	1,480	90.8%	735	86.47%	450	90%	280	81.16%
Indigenous	205	6.04%	170	6.63%	10	0.46%	50	3.07%	60	7.06%	15	3%	25	7.25%
East Asian (Note: Statistic includes total responses of "Chinese", "Korean", and "Japanese" under visible minority section on census.)	65	1.91%	60	2.34%	160	7.29%	60	3.68%	40	4.71%	25	5%	35	10.14%
Southeast Asian (Note: Statistic includes total responses of "Filipino" and "Southeast Asian" under visible minority section on census.)	60	1.77%	60	2.34%	15	0.68%	10	0.61%	10	1.18%	10	2%	0	0%
South Asian	35	1.03%	30	1.17%	0	0%	20	1.23%	0	0%	0	0%	5	1.45%
African	15	0.44%	10	0.39%	0	0%	10	0.61%	10	1.18%	0	0%	0	0%
Latin American	10	0.29%	10	0.39%	0	0%	20	1.23%	0	0%	0	0%	0	0%
Middle Eastern (Note: Statistic includes total responses of "West Asian" and "Arab" under visible minority section on census.)	0	0%	0	0%	0	0%	0	0%	0	0%	0	0%	0	0%
Other/multiracial (Note: Statistic includes total responses of "Visible minority, n.i.e." and "Multiple visible minorities" under visible minority section on census.)	0	0%	0	0%	10	0.46%	0	0%	0	0%	—N/a	—N/a	—N/a	—N/a
Total responses	3,395	99.65%	2,565	99.65%	2,195	100.14%	1,630	99.27%	850	99.18%	500	99.6%	345	99.42%
Total population	3,407	100%	2,574	100%	2,192	100%	1,642	100%	857	100%	502	100%	347	100%
Note: Totals greater than 100% due to multiple origin responses.

== Later community ==
The village fortunes have been interdependent with Mount Currie for decades. Whereas agriculture, then forestry, previously dominated, the community moved from a resource-based town to a resort-dependent town in the 1980s. By the end of the 1980s, agriculture and manufacturing had all but disappeared. Accommodation, food, and beverage had become the largest employer. However, residents dislike being a bedroom community for Whistler. The rapid population growth has created a housing shortage. Local employment opportunities are limited and commuting is the norm.

In 2019, TELUS completed the laying of fibre optic cables to homes and businesses in the area.

New modernized traditional-style commercial structures include Portage Station, Winchester, and the Pemberton Gateway Village Suites Building (with nostalgic Red Clock Tower) with covered porches, Pemberton Valley Lodge, and the Pemberton Barn that houses the Friday Farmers Market. The library and community centre have covered walkways on three sides.

Two residential development proposals presented in 2022 were Benchlands on the northwest corner of Pemberton and Redwoods between Pemberton and Mount Currie. The former would create 270 new single-detached and multi-family units and the latter 176 multi-family townhouses. Community opinions are split between affordability and high density, threatening the community's character.

BC Transit provides daily services. The municipality operates the Pemberton Regional Airport (CYPS)

== Education ==
In 1929, Bertha Green was the inaugural teacher when the Pemberton school opened near the train station. In 1951, the Pemberton Superior School opened for grades 1–10 to replace the existing school. In 1957, the new larger Elementary-High school was completed, which provided additional classrooms and a gym. In 1963, Signal Hill Elementary opened. In 1995, a separate new high school was built.

School District 48 Sea to Sky operates three public schools in the village: Q'aLaTKu7em Community School, Signal Hill Elementary and Pemberton Secondary School. The latter two offer dual track English and French immersion.

== Recreational trails ==
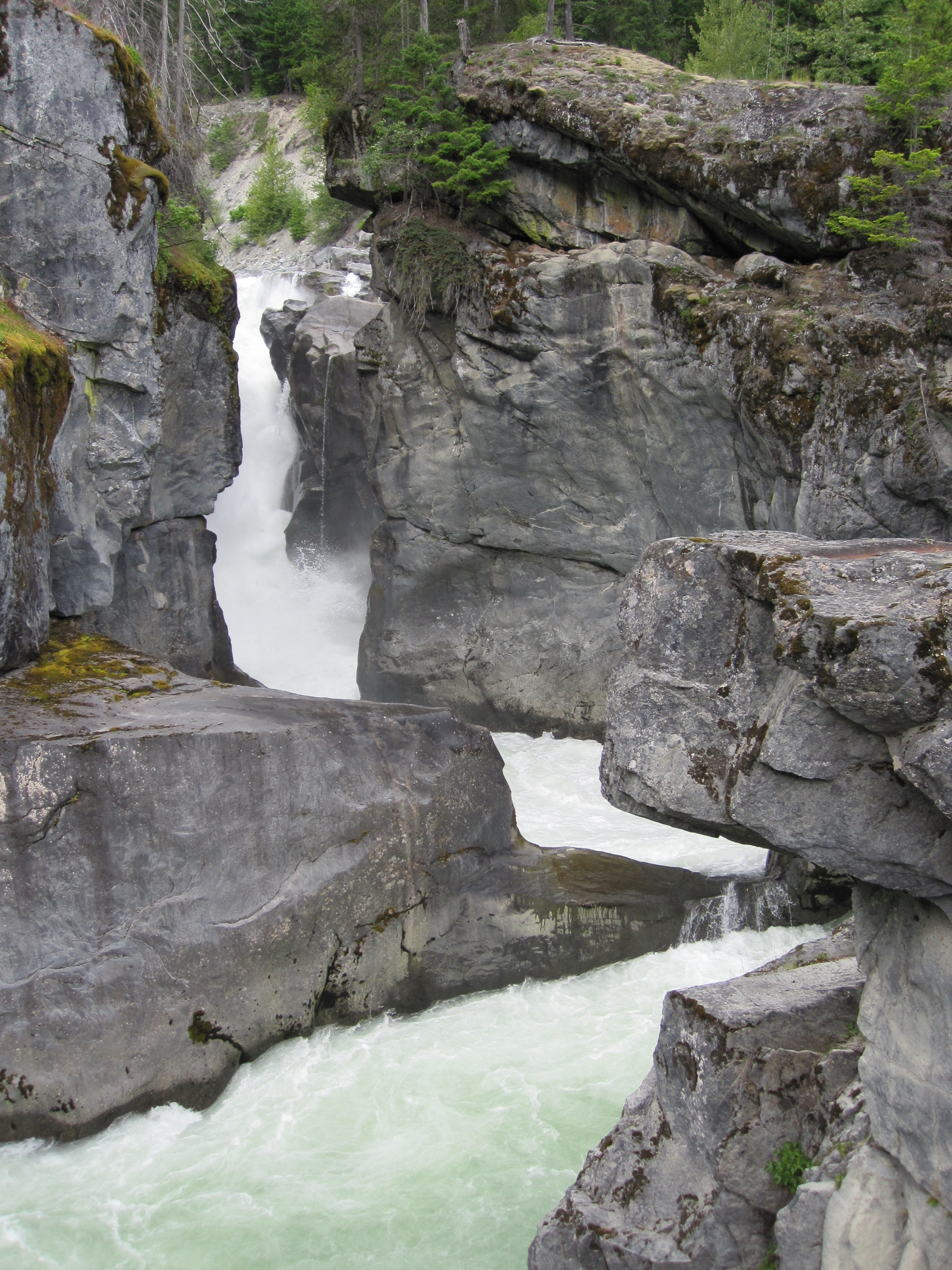
Nairn Falls, Green River, Nairn Falls Provincial Park

The Pemberton Valley Trail Association has built 48 kilometres (30 mi) of public trails for cross-country skiing, biking, walking, or horseback riding. The latest trail connects One Mile Lake to Nairn Falls, a 1-hour hike in summer each way but can be used year-round with skis or snowshoes in winter. This trail was completed in 2012 and is part of the TransCanada Trail Network, Sea to Sky and Cariboo Trail Section. There are real hitching posts all round town to tie up your horses. There are almost 200 kilometres (120 mi) of public trails in the Pemberton Valley System.

== Music festivals ==
On July 25–27, 2008, Pemberton hosted the Pemberton Festival, produced by Live Nation, which had a musical lineup of 66 acts including Nine Inch Nails, Coldplay, Jay-Z, Tom Petty & the Heartbreakers, The Tragically Hip, Death Cab for Cutie, Vampire Weekend, Metric, and Interpol. The festival was the first to be held in the valley since the Stein Voices for the Wilderness Festivals of 1989–90, held in nearby Mount Currie, which drew over 35,000 people, the largest number of people in the valley since the gold rush. Its roster of artists included Gordon Lightfoot, Bruce Cockburn, and Spirit of the West.

Pemberton Music Festival was re-organized in 2014 by New Orleans–based company, HUKA Entertainment. The event took place July 16–20, 2014, and brought in over 30,000 attendees over the span of five days. The festival featured multiple stages of live entertainment, with different genres including rock, indie rock, hip hop, electronic, heavy metal, and comedy. Buses and shuttles were used to bring people from surrounding communities to prevent the first Pemberton Festivals traffic issues. Approximately 20,000 attended in 2014.

The second revived Pemberton Music Festival July 16–19, 2015, included the artists Missy Elliott, Weezer and Jane's Addiction, with an estimated attendance of 115,000. In 2016, the daily crowd was estimated at 45,000, with an overall attendance of close to 180,000. The 2017 Music Festival was officially cancelled and declared bankruptcy on May 18, 2017.

From 2008 to 2014, the one-day Two Acre Shaker music festival was held. The Becker's property, the venue until 2011, would sell out. The Lillooet Lake Rodeo grounds at Mount Currie, which had double the capacity hosted the final years.

== Notable people ==
- Barry Sonnenfeld (1953–), movie director, is a resident.

== Media ==
Pemberton news is covered by Whistler's weekly newspaper, Pique Newsmagazine, published every Thursday and also available online.

Pemberton Magazine is also published once a year by Pique Newsmagazine for Tourism Pemberton.

== Climate ==
The climate of Pemberton is very warm and dry in the summer and mild and wet in the winter. Pemberton is an ecologically complex and diverse zone which is referred to as the Coast-Interior Transition zone. Moving from west to east in the direction of the prevailing winds and taking into consideration the elevation changes; it follows that there is a windward, wetter zone and a leeward drier zone and an even drier zone on the leeward side of the Lillooet Ranges and the Pacific Ranges north of the rail line. High summer temperatures and the pronounced water deficits during the growing season are the norm.

== Fauna ==
- Mammals:
  - Large predators:
    - Bears: Grizzly and black bears
    - Big cats: Canada lynx, bobcat and their hybrids, North American cougar
    - Grey wolf, coyote, and their hybrids, fox, wolverine
  - Herbivores and ungulates:
    - Hybrid black-tailed deer / mule deer, elk, moose, mountain goats, and mountain sheep
- Avians: waterfowl and raptors
- Reptiles:
  - Garter snakes – 3 species:
    - Northwestern garter snake Thamnophis ordinoides
    - Western terrestrial garter snake AKA Wandering garter snake Thamnophis elegans vagrans
    - Thamnophis sirtalis – 3 subspecies 3a) Valley garter snake / Thamnophis sirtalis fitchi, 3b) Valley garter snake / Thamnophis sirtalis fitchi, 3c) Red-sided garter snake (or "Red Racer") Thamnophis sirtalis parietalis
  - Northern Rubber Boa Charina bottae Limited Range British Columbia is the most Northern, and closest boa range to either pole.
  - Sharp-tailed snake Contia tenuis Endangered newly discovered, limited range only known mainland habitat.
  - alligator lizards Elgaria coerulea principis and Western Skink Eumeces skiltonianus both lizards Limited Range in hottest and driest areas
  - Northern Pacific Rattlesnake Crotalus oreganus oreganus Edge of Historical Range, no longer extant, limited range. Once found only in specific micro-climates: hottest and driest areas with southern exposure under rock outcroppings and long needle pine, before DDT.
- Amphibians – newts, tree frogs, frogs, and large Western Toad

== See also ==
- List of francophone communities in British Columbia
