= Pemberton Valley =

Valley in British Columbia, Canada

Coordinates: 50°30′00″N 123°00′00″W

The Pemberton Valley is a valley flanking the Lillooet River upstream from Lillooet Lake, including the communities of Mount Currie, Pemberton, British Columbia and the agricultural district surrounding them and flanking the river as far upstream as the Pemberton Meadows area. The term is normally used only to refer to inhabited parts of the valley, not the unsettled areas to the north of Pemberton Meadows although the official definition extends from the head of Lillooet Lake all the way up to the confluence of Meager Creek. Historically the region was part of the Lillooet Country but due to re-orientation of the area's economy and society since the opening and expansion of BC Highway 99 the area is now more considered to be part of the Sea-to-Sky Corridor.
