= Cadwaladr =

Cadwaladr, Cadwalader or Cadwallader (with other variant spellings) is a given name and surname of Welsh origin meaning "battle-leader". It was most notably held by Cadwaladr, a seventh-century king of Gwynedd, who was the last Welsh king to claim lordship over all of Britain.

== Pronunciation ==
The name is pronounced [kadˈwaladər] in Welsh and typically /kədˈwɒlədər/ in English.

== People with the given name ==
Cadwaladr
- Pronunciation: [kadˈwaladər]
- Gender: masculine

Origin
- Origin: Welsh
- Meaning: "battle-leader"
- Region of origin: Wales

- Cadwaladr ap Cadwallon (633–682), king of Gwynedd
- Cadwaladr ap Gruffydd (c. 1096–1172), third son of Gruffydd ap Cynan, king of Gwynedd
- Cadwaladr ap Rhys Trefnant (fl. 1600), Welsh poet
- Cadwaladr Cesail (fl. 1620), Welsh poet
- Cadwaladr Bryner Jones (1872–1954), Welsh agriculturalist
- Cadwalader Ringgold (1802–1867), American Naval Officer

== People with the surname or patronymic ==
Cadwaladr
Origin
- Language: Welsh

- Betsi Cadwaladr (1789–1860), Welsh nurse
- Cadfan ap Cadwaladr (c. 1140 – c. 1215), Lord of Ceredigion (son of Cadwaladr ap Gruffydd)
- Dafydd Cadwaladr (1752–1834), Welsh Calvinistic Methodist preacher
- Dilys Cadwaladr (1902–1979), Welsh poet
- Edward Cadwaladr, 16th-century Welsh poet
- Ellis Cadwaladr (fl. 1707–1740), Welsh poet
- Huw Cadwaladr, 17th-century Welsh poet
- Llewellyn Cadwaladr (1857–1909), Welsh operatic tenor
- Rhys Cadwaladr (fl. 1666–1690), Welsh poet

== People with the surname in variant spellings ==
This section lists people whose surname is a variant spelling of Cadwaladr other than Cadwalader and Cadwallader, which have their own dedicated pages.

- Roger Cadwallador (1568–1610), English beatified Roman Catholic priest and martyr
- Carole Cadwalladr (born 1969), British author and journalist

== See also ==
- Cadwalader (disambiguation)
- Cadwallader (name)
- Cadwallader (disambiguation)
- Betsi Cadwaladr University Health Board
- Cædwalla of Wessex
- Algernon Cadwallader
