= Cadwalader =

Cadwalader by itself most often refers to

- Cadwalader, Wickersham & Taft, the oldest continuously running law firm in the United States
- Cadwalader's Ice Cream, a chain of ice cream parlours across Wales

As a given name, it may also refer to

- Cadwaladr ap Cadwallon, King of Gwynedd from c. 655 to 682
- Cædwalla of Wessex, King of Wessex from 685 until 688
- Cadwaladr ap Gruffydd (12th century), brother of Owain Gwynedd

== People with the given name ==
- Cadwalader Evans (1762–1841), American politician
- Cadwalader Morris (1741–1795), American politician
- Cadwalader Ringgold (1802–1867), American naval officer and explorer

== People with the surname ==
- Beatrix Cadwalader Farrand (born 1872), United States, Landscape Gardener
- Gardner Cadwalader (born 1948), United States Olympic rower
- George Cadwalader (1806–1879), general in the United States Army
- John Cadwalader (1805–1879), American lawyer, jurist, and politician from Philadelphia, Pennsylvania
- John Cadwalader (1742–1786), American merchant and soldier from Philadelphia, Pennsylvania
- John Lambert Cadwalader (1836–1914), lawyer from Pennsylvania, assistant U.S. secretary of state
- Lambert Cadwalader (1742–1823), American merchant and leader in New Jersey and Pennsylvania
- Thomas Cadwalader (1708–1799), American physician in Philadelphia
- Thomas McCall Cadwalader (1795–1873), American military general
- Betsi Cadwaladr (1789–1860), Welsh nurse

== Places ==
- Cadwalader Beach, New Zealand
- Cadwalader Heights, Trenton, New Jersey, United States
- Cadwalader Inlet, Antarctica
- Cadwalader Park, Trenton, New Jersey, United States

== Other ==
- Cadwaladerite, a mineral
- Cadwalader family, 18–19th century American family

== See also ==
- Cadwaladr
- Cadwallader (name)
- Cadwallader (disambiguation)
