= Tolkien Peak =

Mountain in BC, Canada

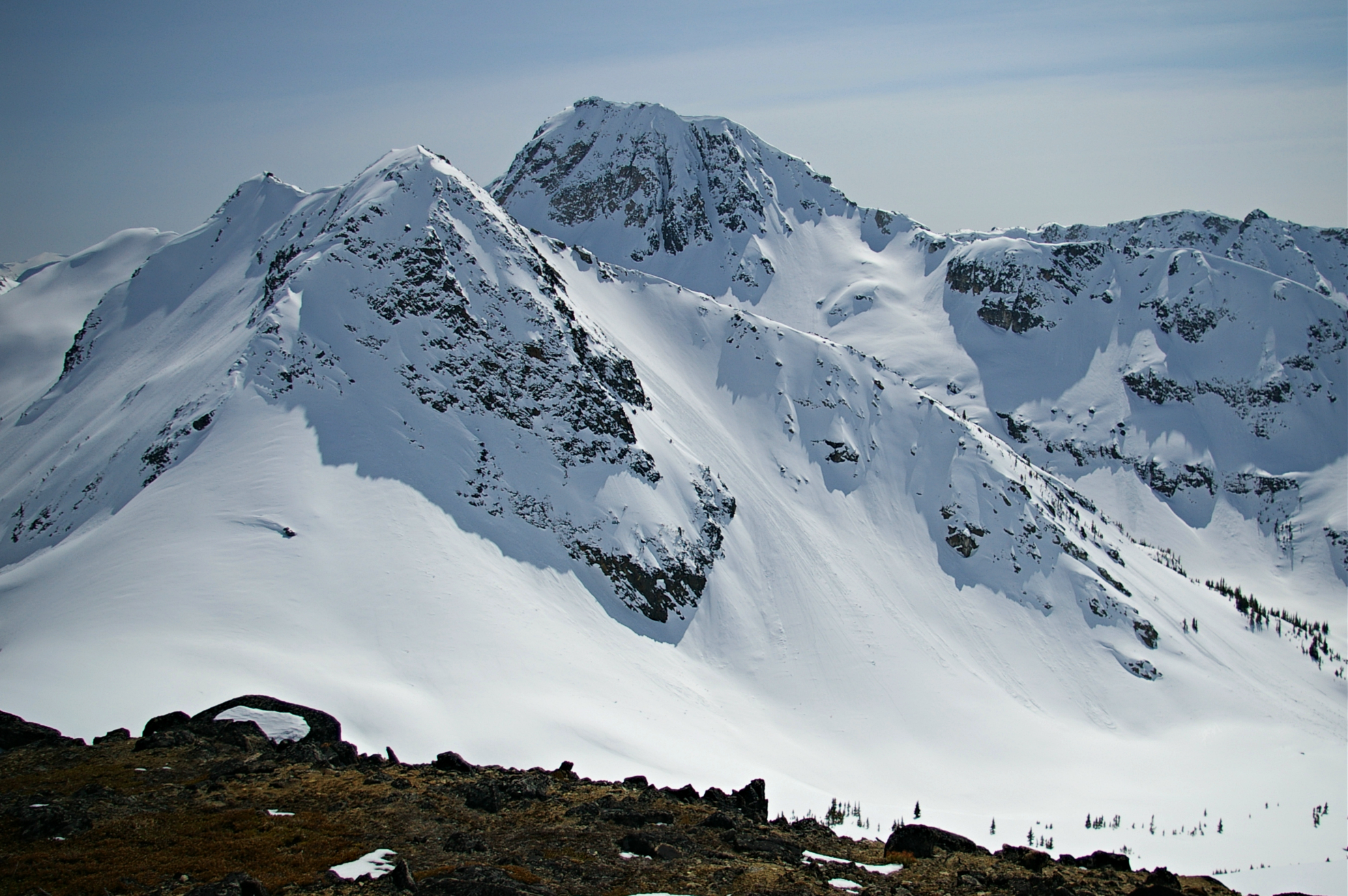
- Tolkien Peak, northern aspect

Highest point
- Elevation: 2,380 m (7,810 ft)
- Prominence: 350 m (1,150 ft)
- Parent peak: Mount Gandalf (2391 m)
- Listing: Mountains of British Columbia
- Coordinates: 50°36′24″N 122°42′41″W

Geography
- Location within British Columbia Location within Canada
- Country: Canada
- Province: British Columbia
- District: Lillooet Land District
- Protected area: Birkenhead Lake Provincial Park
- Parent range: Cadwallader Range; Coast Mountains
- Topo map: NTS 92J10 Birkenhead Lake

Climbing
- Easiest route: Scrambling via Southeast Ridge

Tolkien Peak is a 2,380-metre (7,810-foot) mountain summit located in the Cadwallader Range in southwestern British Columbia, Canada. It is situated in Birkenhead Lake Provincial Park, 32 km (20 mi) north of Pemberton, and 2.9 km (2 mi) south of Mount Gandalf, which is its nearest higher peak. The peak is named for J. R. R. Tolkien (1892–1973), author of the novels The Hobbit and The Lord of the Rings. The names for nearby Mount Aragorn, Mount Gandalf, and Mount Shadowfax were taken from fictional characters in his books, which were read while waiting out stormy weather during the 1972 first ascents of those mountains. Precipitation runoff from the peak drains into tributaries of the Fraser River.

== Climate ==
Based on the Köppen climate classification, Tolkien Peak is located in a subarctic climate zone of western North America. Most weather fronts originate in the Pacific Ocean, and travel east toward the Coast Mountains where they are forced upward by the range (Orographic lift), causing them to drop their moisture in the form of rain or snowfall. As a result, the Coast Mountains experience high precipitation, especially during the winter months in the form of snowfall. Temperatures can drop below −20 °C with wind chill factors below −30 °C. The months July through September offer the most favorable weather for climbing Tolkien Peak.

== See also ==
- Geography of British Columbia
- Geology of British Columbia
