= Cadwallader (name) =

Cadwallader is a given name and surname of Welsh origin. Notable people with the name include:

== Surname ==
- Abel G. Cadwallader (1841–1907), American Civil War soldier awarded the Medal of Honor
- Alice A. W. Cadwallader (1832–1910), American philanthropist and temperance activist
- Brooke Cadwallader (1908–1994), American textile designer
- Douglass Cadwallader (1884–1971), American golfer
- Gavin Cadwallader (born 1986), English football player
- Robyn Cadwallader, Australian author
- W. Ray Cadwallader (c. 1932–2016), American politician
- Stan Cadwallader, husband of Jim Nabors

== Given name ==
- Henry Cadwallader Adams (1817–1899), English cleric, schoolmaster and novelist
- Cadwallader John Bates (1853–1902), English historian and antiquarian
- Cadwallader Blayney, 10th Baron Blayney (1769–1784), Irish lord
- Cadwallader Blayney, 12th Baron Blayney (1802–1874), Irish nobleman and politician
- Cadwallader Colden (1688–1776), Scottish-American physician, natural scientist, and politician
- Cadwallader D. Colden (1769–1834), American politician
- Cadwallader Jones Jr. (1813–1899), American politician
- Cadwallader Owen (c. 1562 – 1617), Welsh Anglican clergyman
- Cadwallader C. Washburn (1818–1882), American businessman, politician and soldier
- Cadwallader Lincoln Washburn (1866–1965), American artist and war correspondent
- Cadwallader Jackson Wiltse (1823–1900), American politician
- Cadwallader Wolseley (1806–1872), Irish Anglican priest

== Other ==
- Algernon Cadwallader, American emo band

== See also ==
- Cadwallader (disambiguation)
- Cadwalader (disambiguation)
- Cadwaladr
