= Cadwallader =

Cadwallader may refer to:

- Cadwallader (name), a surname and given name; the article list of people with this name
- Cadwaladr, the standard Welsh form of this name; the article lists other variant spellings
- Cadwalader (disambiguation), a further variant form of the name

== Places ==
- Cadwallader Range, a mountain range in British Columbia, Canada
- Cadwallader Creek, British Columbia, Canada
- Cadwallader, a former name of West Chester, Ohio

== Other ==
- Algernon Cadwallader, an American emo band
