= Mount Gandalf =

Mountain in the country of Canada

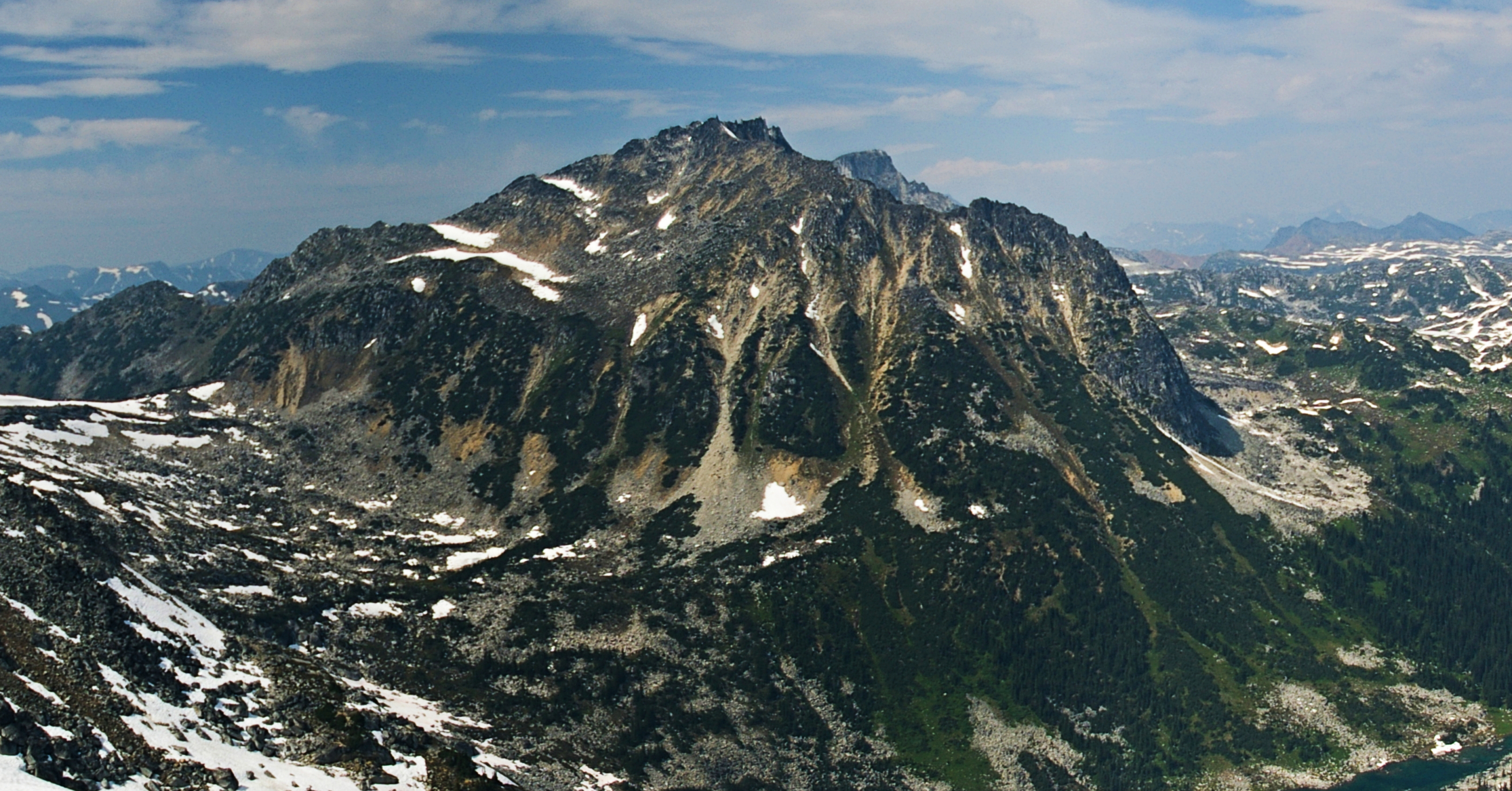
- Mount Gandalf, southeast aspect

Highest point
- Elevation: 2,391 m (7,844 ft)
- Prominence: 106 m (348 ft)
- Parent peak: Mount Aragorn (2435 m)
- Listing: Mountains of British Columbia
- Coordinates: 50°37′54″N 122°42′07″W

Geography
- Location within British Columbia Location within Canada
- Interactive map of Mount Gandalf
- Location: Birkenhead Lake Provincial Park; British Columbia, Canada
- District: Lillooet Land District
- Parent range: Cadwallader Range; Coast Mountains
- Topo map: NTS 92J10 Birkenhead Lake

Geology
- Rock type: granite

Climbing
- First ascent: 1972 by Fred Thiessen, Eric White, Peter Jordan
- Easiest route: Scramble class 2 via South Face

Mount Gandalf is a 2,391-metre (7,844-foot) mountain summit in the Cadwallader Range in southwestern British Columbia, Canada. It is at the northeast corner of Birkenhead Lake Provincial Park, 35 km (22 mi) north of Pemberton, 56 km (35 mi) west of Lillooet, 2.9 km (2 mi) north of Tolkien Peak, and immediately south of Mount Aragorn, which is its nearest higher peak. Precipitation runoff from the peak drains into tributaries of the Fraser River.

== History ==
The first ascent of the mountain was made on May 8, 1972, by Peter Jordan, Fred Thiessen, and Eric White. This climbing party also made the first ascents of nearby Mount Aragorn and Mount Shadowfax. The names for Mounts Aragorn, Gandalf, and Shadowfax were taken from fictional characters in the novels The Hobbit and The Lord of the Rings by J. R. R. Tolkien, which were read while waiting out stormy weather during the 1972 outing. However, Mount Gandalf became incorrectly identified on maps as Shadowfax, and vice versa, as originally proposed in 1978 by Karl Ricker of the Alpine Club of Canada. The mountains' names were corrected as recommended in March 2006 by Scott Nelson and endorsed by the BC Mountaineering Club. The correction was officially adopted December 4, 2006, by the Geographical Names Board of Canada.

== Climate ==
Based on the Köppen climate classification, Mount Gandalf is in a subarctic climate zone of western North America. Most weather fronts originate in the Pacific Ocean, and travel east toward the Coast Mountains where they are forced upward by the range (Orographic lift), causing them to drop their moisture in the form of rain or snowfall. As a result, the Coast Mountains experience high precipitation, especially during the winter months in the form of snowfall. Temperatures can drop below −20 °C with wind chill factors below −30 °C. The months July through September offer the most favorable weather for climbing Mount Gandalf.

== Climbing Routes ==
Established climbing routes on Mount Gandalf:

- South Face - class 2
- North Ridge - class 3
- Wizard of Choss (East Face) - class 5.7

== Gallery ==
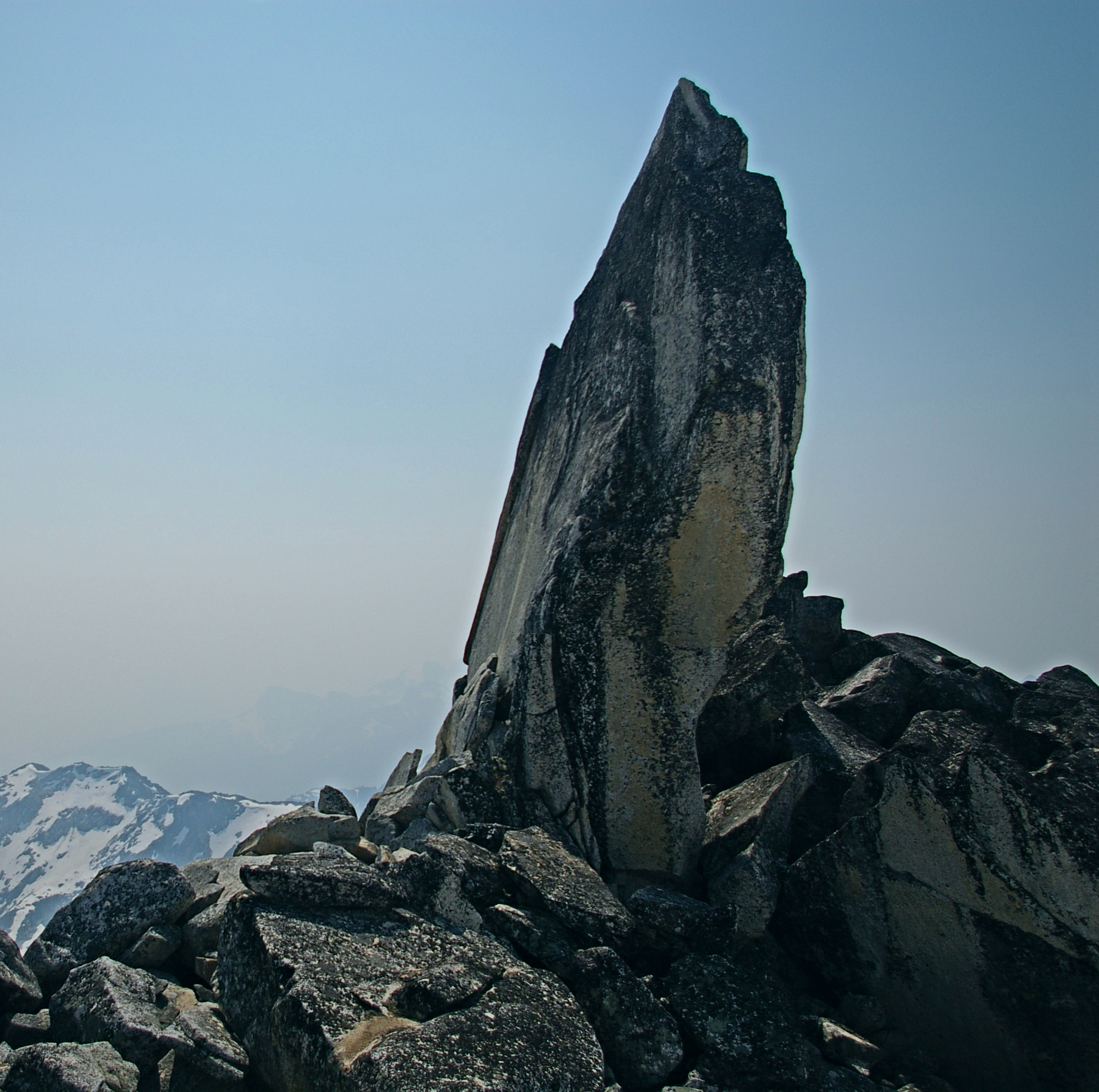
The granite spire that is the summit of Gandalf

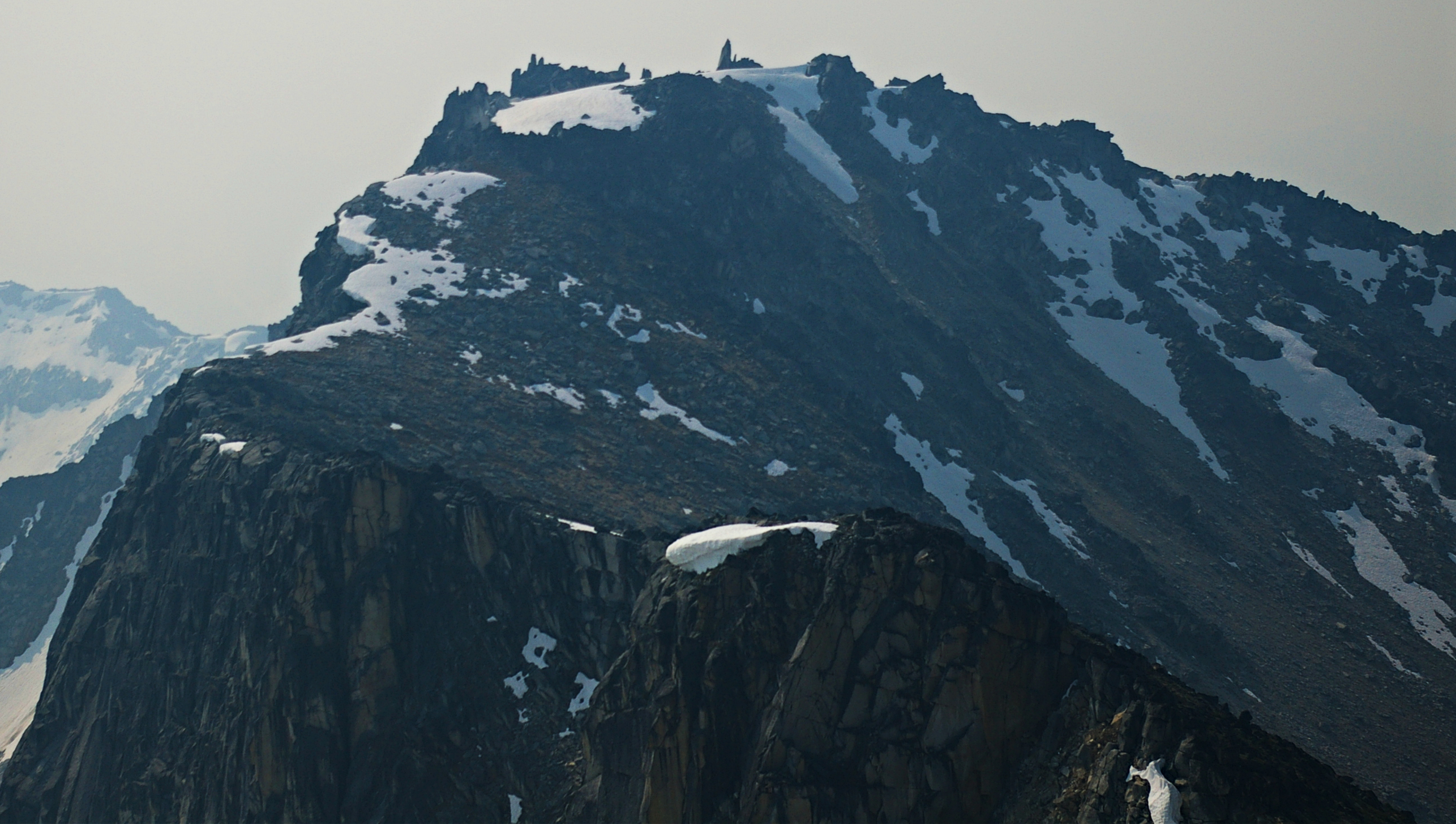
Mount Gandalf, north aspect

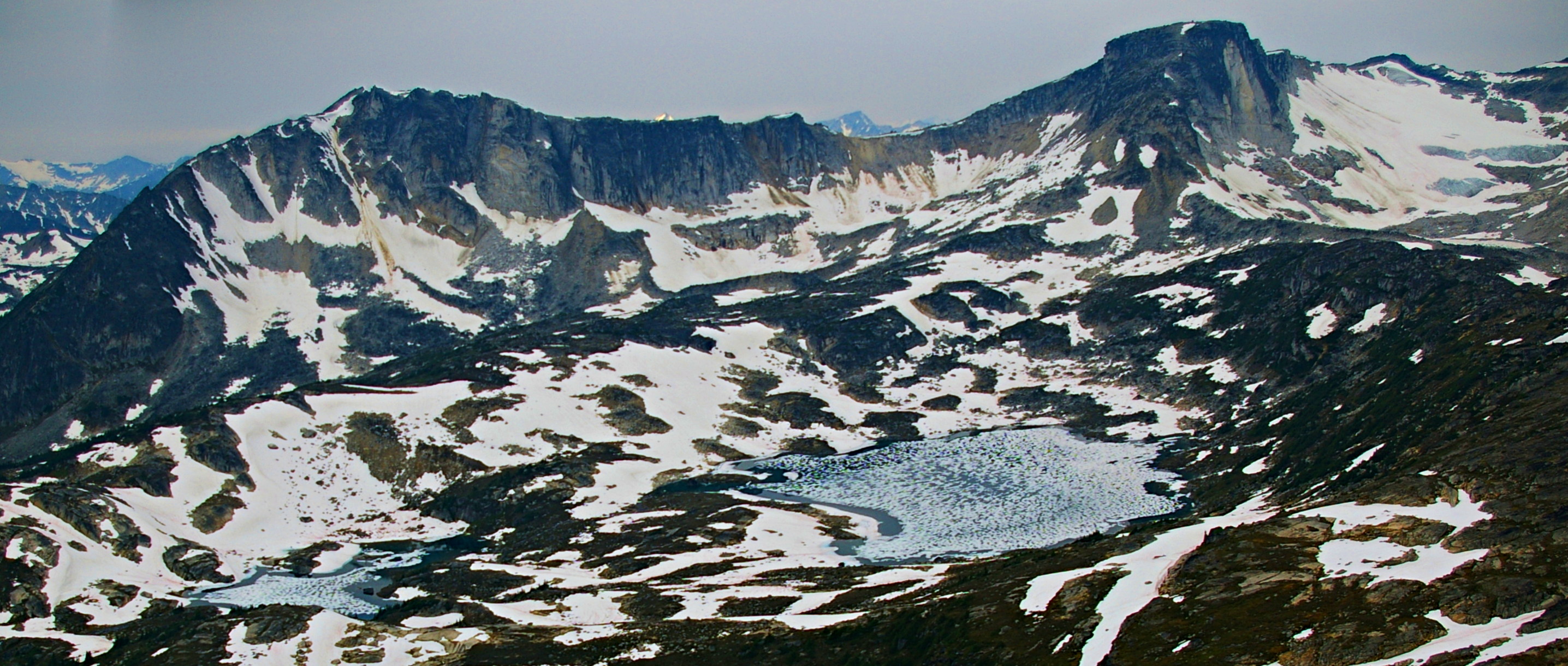
Gandalf (left) and Aragorn (right) seen from Mount Shadowfax

== See also ==
- Geography of British Columbia
- Geology of British Columbia
