= Mount Shadowfax =

Mountain in the country of Canada

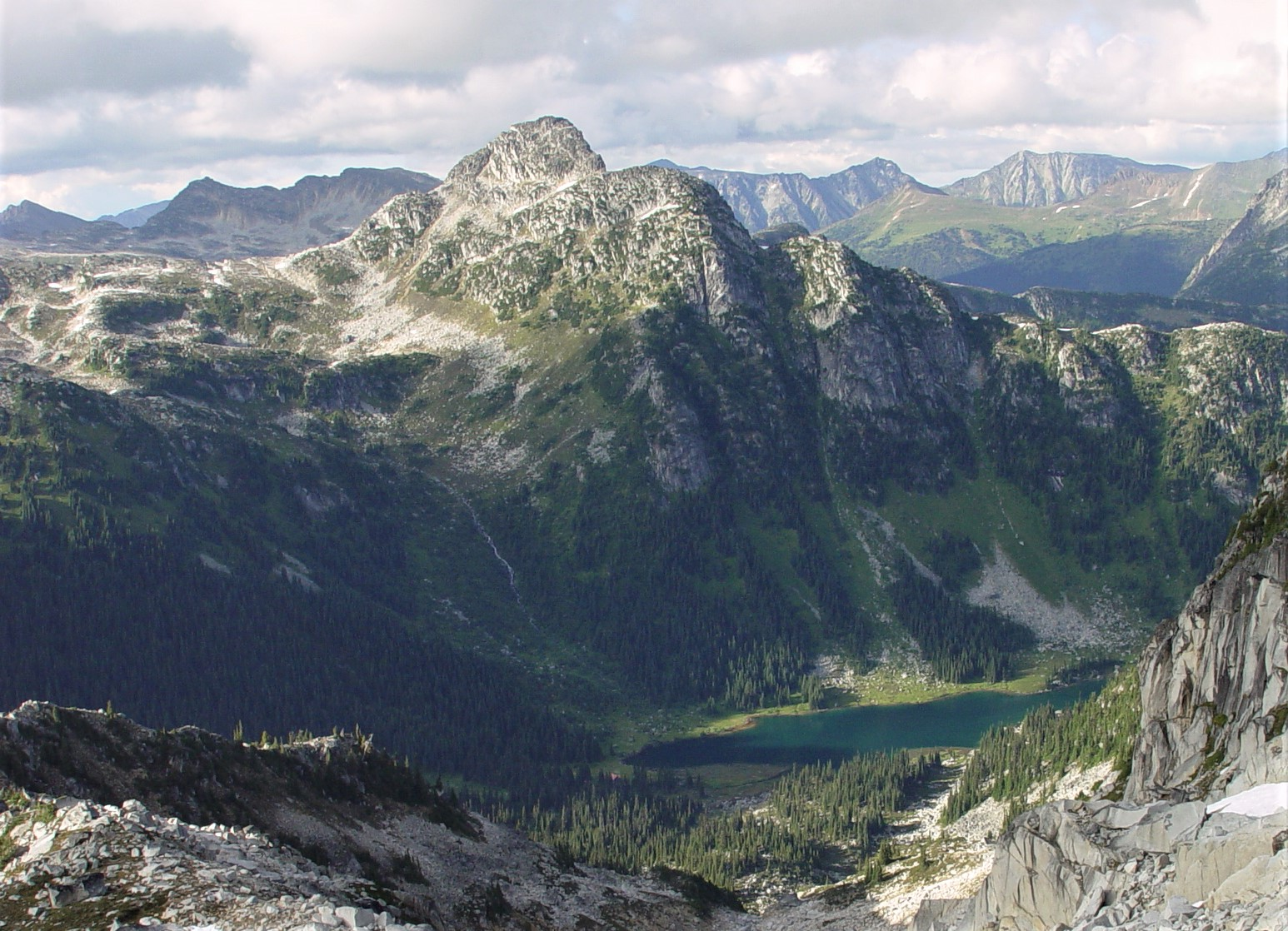
- South aspect

Highest point
- Elevation: 2,315 m (7,595 ft)
- Prominence: 165 m (541 ft)
- Parent peak: Mount Aragorn (2,435 m)
- Isolation: 1.9 km (1.2 mi)
- Listing: Mountains of British Columbia
- Coordinates: 50°38′31″N 122°40′37″W

Geography
- Location within British Columbia Location within Canada
- Interactive map of Mount Shadowfax
- Location: British Columbia, Canada
- District: Lillooet Land District
- Parent range: Cadwallader Range; Coast Mountains
- Topo map: NTS 92J10 Birkenhead Lake

Climbing
- First ascent: May 7, 1972
- Easiest route: Scrambling

Mount Shadowfax is a 2,315-metre (7,595-foot) mountain summit in southwest British Columbia, Canada.

== Description ==
Mount Shadowfax is located in the Cadwallader Range which is a subrange of the Coast Mountains. It is situated 36 km (22 mi) north of Pemberton and 2.07 km (1 mi) northeast of Mount Gandalf. Most precipitation runoff from the peak drains south to Birkenhead Lake via Phelix Creek, however a portion of the north slope drains to Cadwallader Creek, which is a tributary of the Hurley River. Shadowfax is more notable for its steep rise above local terrain than for its absolute elevation as topographic relief is significant with the summit rising over 800 meters (2,625 ft) above Phelix Creek in approximately 2 km (1.2 mi).

== History ==
The first ascent of the mountain was made May 7, 1972, by Peter Jordan and Fred Thiessen. This climbing party also made the first ascents of nearby Mount Gandalf and Mount Aragorn. The names Aragorn, Gandalf, and Shadowfax were taken from fictional characters in the novels The Hobbit and The Lord of the Rings by J. R. R. Tolkien, which were read while waiting out stormy weather during the 1972 outing. Shadowfax is Gandalf's very special horse. The mountain's toponym was originally proposed as Mount Gandalf in 1978 by Karl Ricker of the Alpine Club of Canada and officially adopted January 23, 1979, but was officially changed to Shadowfax on December 4, 2006, by the Geographical Names Board of Canada in accordance with the first ascent party's intention. Older maps will show the two mountains (Gandalf and Shadowfax) with the names interchanged.

== Climate ==
Based on the Köppen climate classification, Mount Shadowfax is located in a subarctic climate zone of western North America. Most weather fronts originate in the Pacific Ocean, and travel east toward the Coast Mountains where they are forced upward by the range (Orographic lift), causing them to drop their moisture in the form of rain or snowfall. As a result, the Coast Mountains experience high precipitation, especially during the winter months in the form of snowfall. Winter temperatures can drop below −20 °C with wind chill factors below −30 °C. The months July through September offer the most favorable weather for climbing Mount Shadowfax.

== See also ==
- Geography of British Columbia
- Tolkien Peak
