= Huw Cadwaladr =

17th-century Welsh poet

Huw Cadwaladr was a 17th-century Welsh poet. His works include an elegy on the death of Edward Morris, and a carol on the death of Rowland Vaughan of Caer Gai.
