= Mansion House (Trenton, New Jersey) =

Historic house in New Jersey, United States

- U.S. National Register of Historic Places
- New Jersey Register of Historic Places
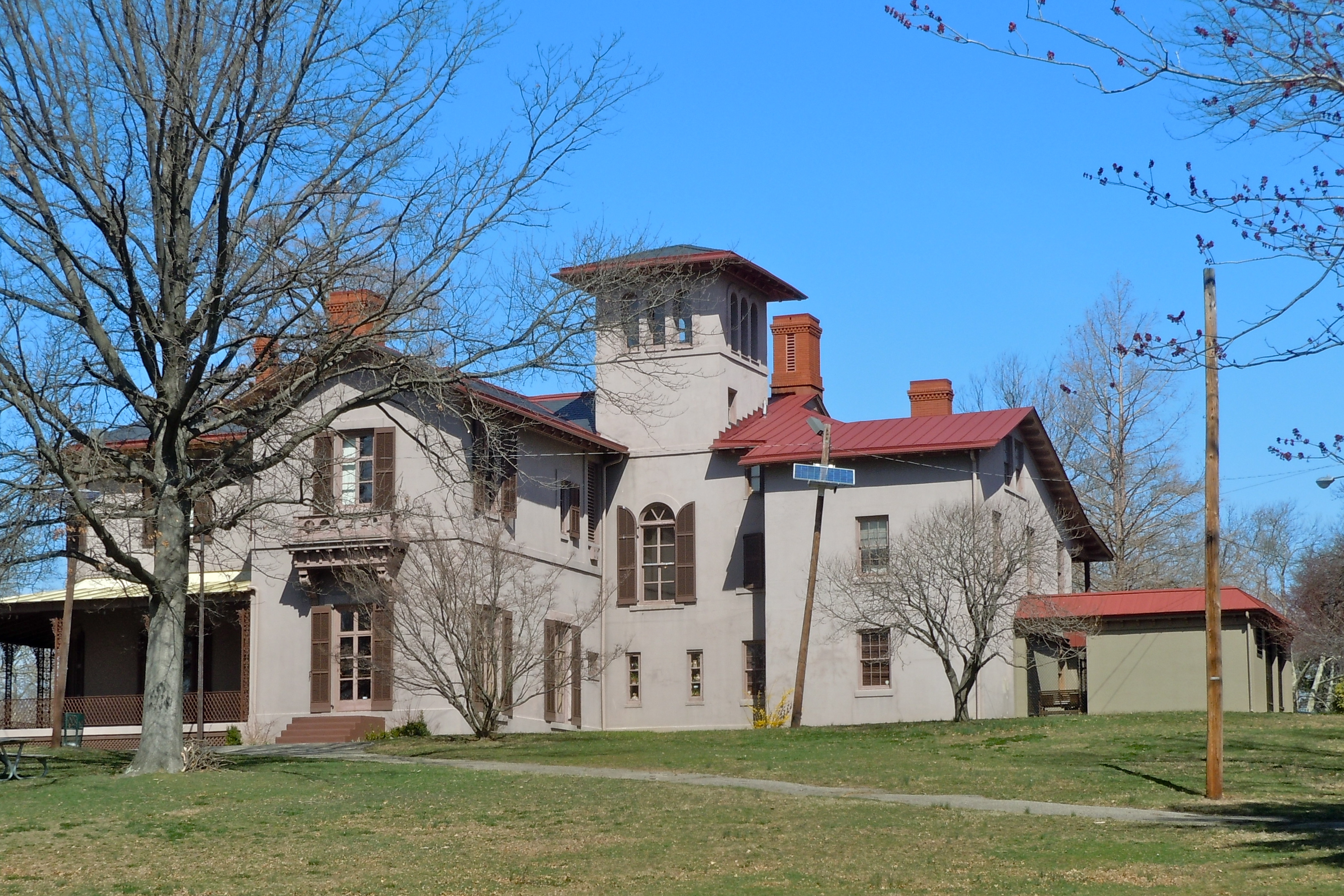

- Location within Mercer County, New Jersey Location within New Jersey Location within the United States
- Location: Cadwalader Park, Trenton, New Jersey
- Coordinates: 40°14′12″N 74°47′22″W
- Area: 100 acres (40 ha)
- Built: 1848
- Architect: John Notman
- Architectural style: Italianate
- NRHP reference No.: 73001112
- NJRHP No.: 1779

Significant dates
- Added to NRHP: February 6, 1973
- Designated NJRHP: May 12, 1972

The Mansion House (also referred to as Ellarslie and the McCall House) is a historic residence located in Cadwalader Park in the city of Trenton in Mercer County, New Jersey, United States. The house was built as a summer residence for Henry McCall Sr. of Philadelphia in 1848, and is one of the earliest examples of Italianate architecture in the United States. The building was added to the National Register of Historic Places on February 6, 1973, for its significance in architecture and landscape architecture.

== History and description ==
The house was designed by architect John Notman as an Italianate villa. It was sold to the park commission of the city of Trenton in 1888. Since 1978 the building has been home to the Trenton City Museum, which features collections of decorative and fine arts.

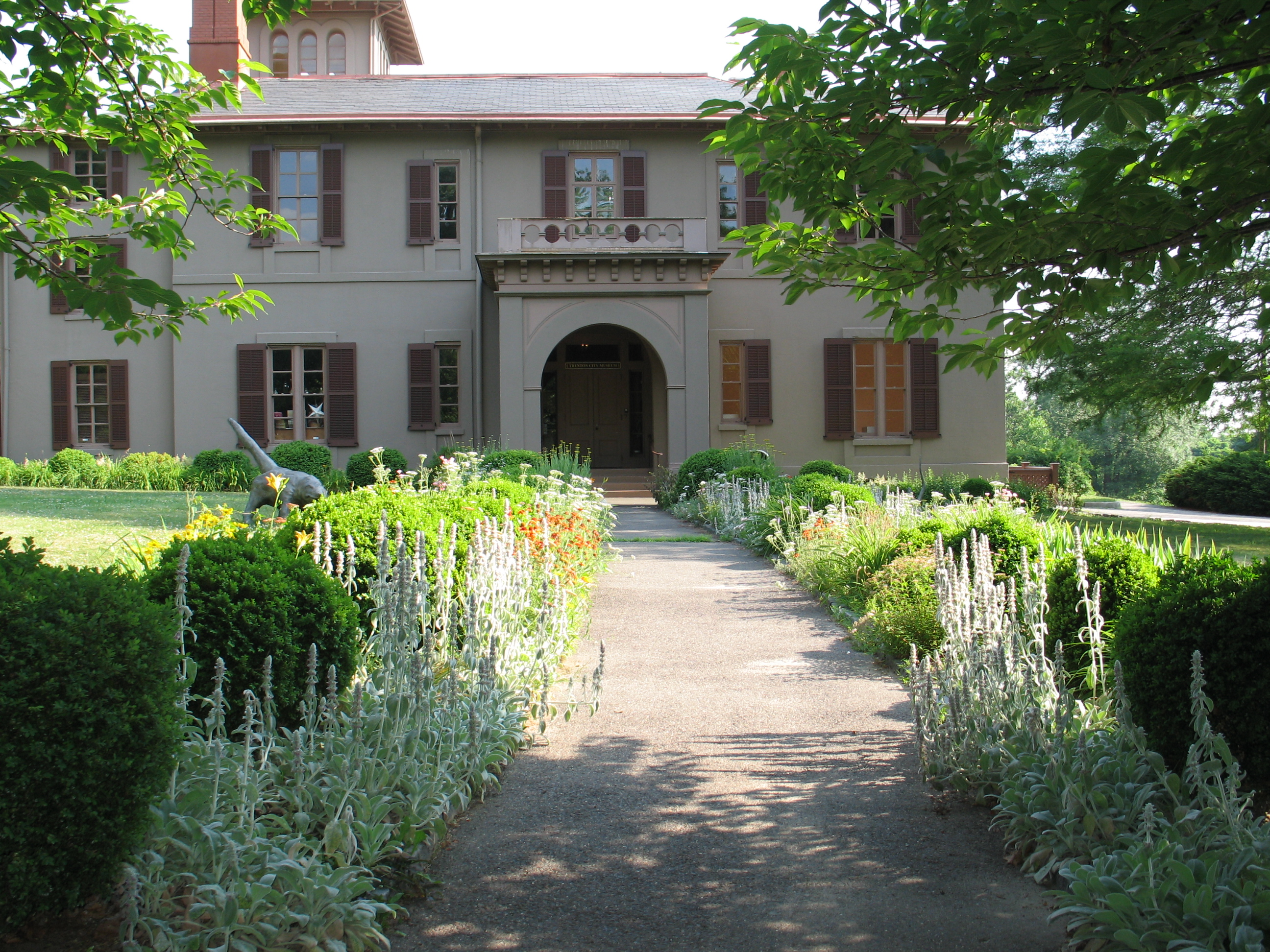
Path to Ellarslie Museum

== See also ==
- National Register of Historic Places listings in Mercer County, New Jersey
