= Rowland Vaughan (poet) =

Rowland Vaughan (c. 1590 – 18 September 1667) was a Welsh poet, translator and jurist.

Vaughan was the owner of Caer Gai, in the parish of Llanuwchlyn, Merioneth in Wales. His paternal family derived from the Vaughans of Llwydiarth. His mother Ellen came from the Nanney or Nannau estate in the same county. Vaughan's wife was from Llanuwchlyn.

Vaughan studied in Oxford where his two sons, John and Edward, were to follow him. He served as sheriff for Merioneth in 1643.

Vaughan was a staunch royalist follower of Charles I during the English Civil War. Following Charles' defeat at the Siege of Chester in 1646, Vaughan was imprisoned for about a year. Around this time his farm was burnt by Parliamentary forces.

After his release from prison, Vaughan focused on rebuilding his finance and exchanging literary works with local poets. Vaughan's translations are of a generally high standard, of works largely Calvinist in content but within a royalist and Anglican context.

After Vaughan's death in 1667, his papers ended up in Brogyntyn (or Porkington), the Ormsby-Gore residence. After the foundation of the National Library of Wales, the papers were filed in the Brogyntyn Collection of the Department of Manuscripts at Aberystwyth.

Vaughan's land-holdings passed to several generations of his descendants but ultimately merged with those of Syr Watkin Williams Wyn circa 1740

== Works ==
- Yr Ymarfer o Dduwioldeb (1630)
- Eikon Basilike (c. 1650)
- Yr Arfer o Weddi yr Arglwydd (1658)
- Pregeth yn Erbyn Schism (1658)
- Prifannau Sanctaidd neu Lawlyfr o Weddiau (1658)
- Ymddiffyniad Rhag Pla o Schism (1658)
- Prifannau Crefydd Gristnogol (1658)
- Evchologia: neu Yr Athrawiaeth i arferol weddio (1660)
- Carolau a Dyriau Duwiol (1729)

== Bibliography ==
- Y Bywgraffiadur Gymreig hyd 1940, London, 1953
- John Ballinger: Lewis Bailey, Yr Ymarfer o Dduwioldeb gan Lewis Bailey Wedi ei gyfieithu i'r Gymreig gan Rowland Vaughan (introduction in English), Cardiff, University of Wales Press, 1930
