= Cadwalader Heights, Trenton, New Jersey =

Populated place in Mercer County, New Jersey, US

Cadwalader Heights
- Neighborhood of Trenton
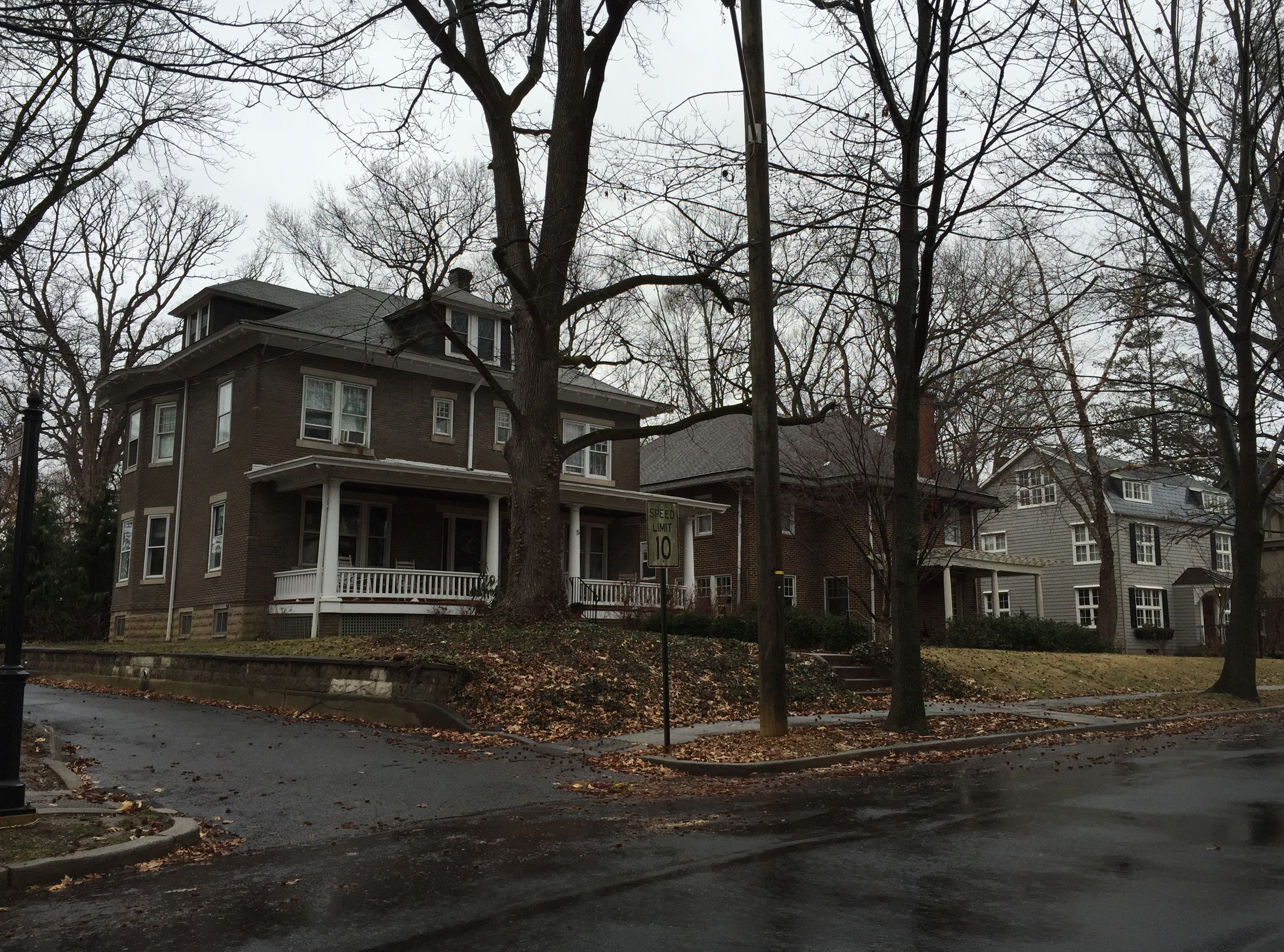
- Homes along Belmont Circle in Cadwalader Heights

- Location of Cadwalader Heights in Mercer County Inset: Location of county within the state of New Jersey Cadwalader Heights (New Jersey) Cadwalader Heights (the United States)
- Coordinates: 40°14′07″N 74°47′09″W
- Country: United States
- State: New Jersey
- County: Mercer
- City: Trenton

Cadwalader Heights is a neighborhood located within the city of Trenton in Mercer County, in the U.S. state of New Jersey. The neighborhood was designed by Frederick Law Olmsted and primarily consists of detached, single-family homes built from 1907 to 1930. Cadwalader Heights is just southeast of Cadwalader Park.
