= Cadwallader Owen =

Welsh clergyman, debater and writer

Cadwallader Owen (c. 1562 – 1617) was a Welsh Church of England clergyman, debater and writer.

== Life ==
Owen was from Maentwrog, Merioneth. He was educated at Jesus College, Oxford, matriculating on 24 November 1581. He obtained his Bachelor of Arts degree in 1583 and Master of Arts degree in 1589. He was a fellow of Oriel College, Oxford, from 1585 to no later than 1606, when he married Blanche Roberts. He was awarded a Bachelor of Divinity degree by the university in 1603. Owen was rector of Llanbrynmair, Merioneth from 1608 onwards. In addition to his clerical duties, he had a reputation for debating, taking the name "Sic doces". His written work is now lost. He died in 1617 and was buried in his parish on 6 April 1617.

His son was Richard Owen, who was a prominent clergyman before and after the Restoration, holding positions in Eltham, St Swithin in London Stone, and North Cray.
