= Cadwalader Morris =

American politician

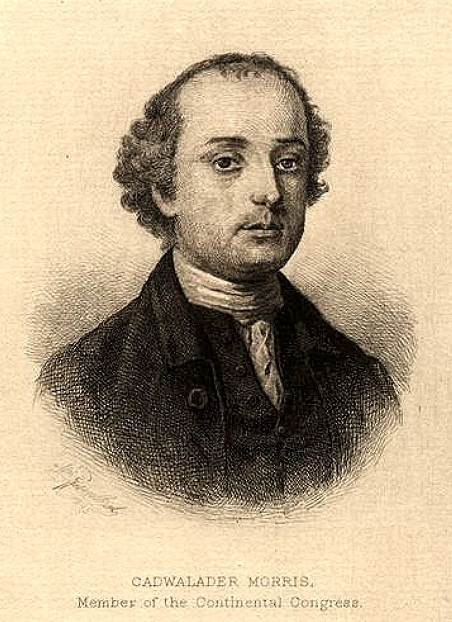
Cadwalader Morris

Cadwalader Morris (February 19, 1741 – January 25, 1795) was an American merchant and politician from Philadelphia, Pennsylvania.

== Early life ==
Morris was born in Philadelphia on February 19, 1741. He was a son of merchant Samuel Morris (1711–1782) and Hannah (née Cadwalader) Morris (1715–1787). His brother was Anthony Cadwalader Morris.

His paternal grandparents were Phoebe (née Guest) Morris and Anthony Morris, the brewer, merchant, judge, assemblyman, and mayor of Philadelphia. His maternal grandparents were Martha (née Jones) Cadwalader and General John Cadwalader, who emigrated from Wales to Philadelphia in 1697, sailing with William Penn on his second voyage to the Quaker City. Among his maternal family was uncle Dr. Thomas Cadwalader, and cousins, General John Cadwalader, U.S. Representative Lambert Cadwalader, and aunt Mary Cadwalader (wife of Judge Samuel Dickinson).

== Career ==
After attending the rural school, Morris became engaged in commercial pursuits and in the management of his estate, residing for a time in the West Indies.

During the American Revolution, he was a member of the First Troop Philadelphia City Cavalry, which was commanded by his cousin, Captain Samuel Morris. He was a delegate for Pennsylvania in the Continental Congress in 1783 and 1784.

In 1781, he was a founder and also a member of the first board of directors of the Bank of North America. After the war he had an iron furnace for several years at Birdsboro, Berks County, Pennsylvania, after which he returned to mercantile pursuits in Philadelphia and was a member of the Democratic Society of Philadelphia.
