= Dafydd Cadwaladr =

Welsh Calvinistic Methodist preacher

Dafydd Cadwaladr (1752 – 9 July 1834) was a Welsh Calvinistic Methodist preacher. He grew up in Llangwm, Denbighshire, where his family had lived for generations. By noting the letters on sheep's backs and then picking his way through the Prayer Book he was able to teach himself to read, and enjoyed reciting works such as the 'Pilgrim's Progress' at the local 'knitting meetings'.

For a while he worked as a farm boy, but c. 1771 he took the position of servant at Fedw Arian, Bala, Gwynedd, working for the Methodist preacher William Evans. Dafydd knew his bible by heart, and about 1780 himself began preaching. He also enjoyed walking, and thus became a popular preacher throughout Wales.

He died in 1834, and is buried at Llanycil. His daughter was the nurse, Betsi Cadwaladr, who worked in the Crimea.
