= Edward Cadwaladr =

Welsh poet

Edward Cadwaladr was a 16th-century Welsh poet. Little is known about him, but it is thought that two of his works (an englyn in reply to one by David Cadwaladr, and a free metre religious poem) may still survive.
