= Cadwallader Range =

Mountain range in British Columbia, Canada

Coordinates: 50°38′00″N 122°38′00″W

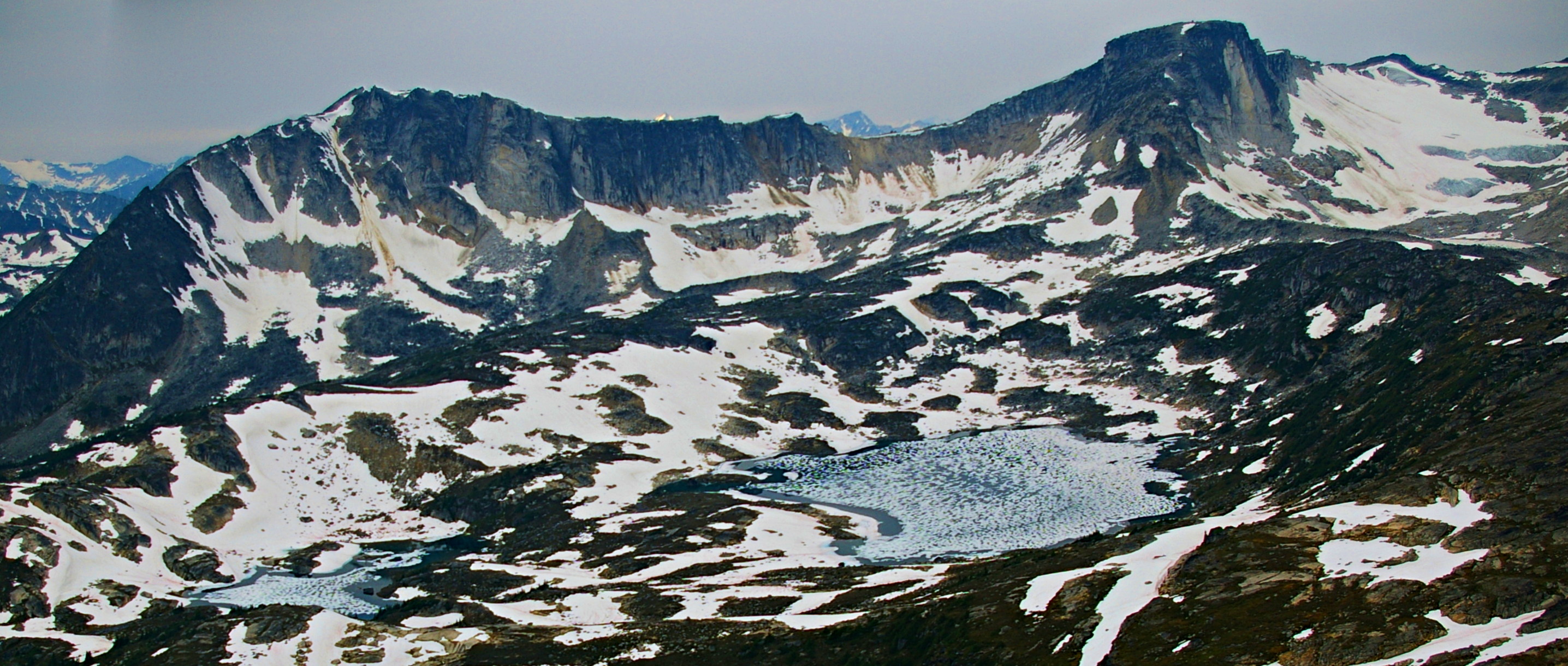
Mt. Gandolf (left) and Mt. Aragorn (right) seen from Mt. Shadowfax

The Cadwallader Range, originally named the Cadwallader Mountains, is a sub-range of the Pacific Ranges of the Coast Mountains in the Bridge River-Lillooet Country of the South-Central Interior of British Columbia, Canada, located between the south end of Anderson Lake (E) and the Hurley River. According to the provincial basemap, the precise alpine boundaries of the range are McGilliray Pass, at its eastern extremity and beyond which is the Bendor Range, and the pass between Noel and Sockeye Creeks on its west, which is immediately north of the lower end of Birkenhead Lake. The officially unnamed range west of that has been called the Noel Range, after its main peak Mount Noel. At the foot of the range along its northeast flank is Cadwallader Creek, scene of the historic and once-rich Bralorne and Pioneer Mines and the ghost town of Bralorne (a.k.a. Bralorne-Pioneer).

The range was named Cadwallader Mountains in 1917, and was renamed the Cadwallader Range in 1951. The name is derived from that of the creek, which was named after a Welshman Evan Cadwallader, his surname ultimately derives from a medieval Welsh king Cadwaladr c.655 – 682 AD.

Evan was a prospector who visited the area in 1865 as a member of an exploration party of four, commissioned by Governor Seymour to investigate mining potentials in the area, and who lived afterwards at Moodyville. A post office named for him operated from 1900 to 1902 somewhere along the creek's course, but its exact location is unknown.

== See also ==
- Birkenhead Peak
- Chief Hunter Jack
- Mount Aragorn
- Mount Gandalf
- Mount Shadowfax
