= Cadwalader Park =

City park in Trenton, New Jersey, US

Coordinates: 40.237°N 74.79°W

Cadwalader Park

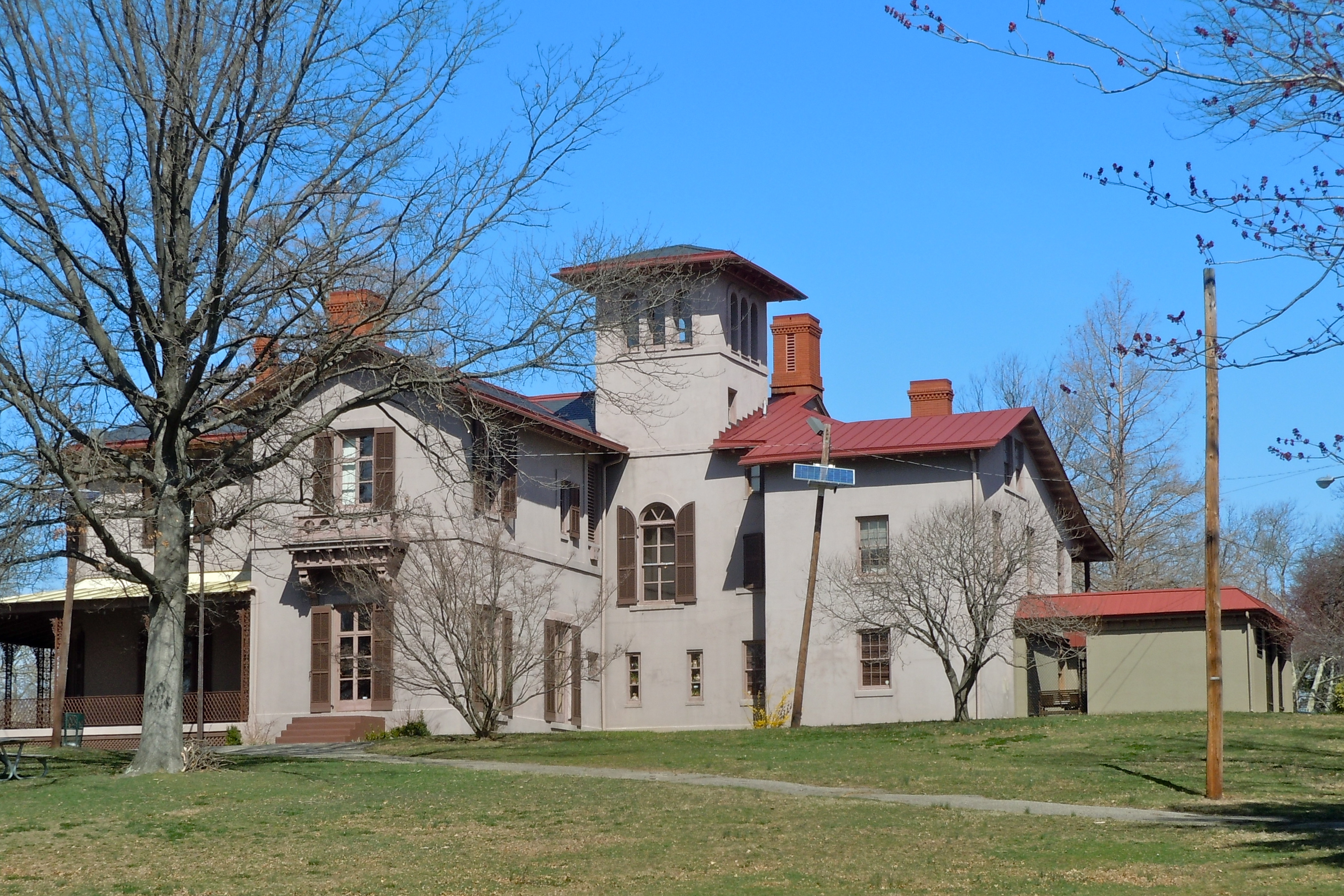
Ellarslie Mansion, home of the Trenton City Museum

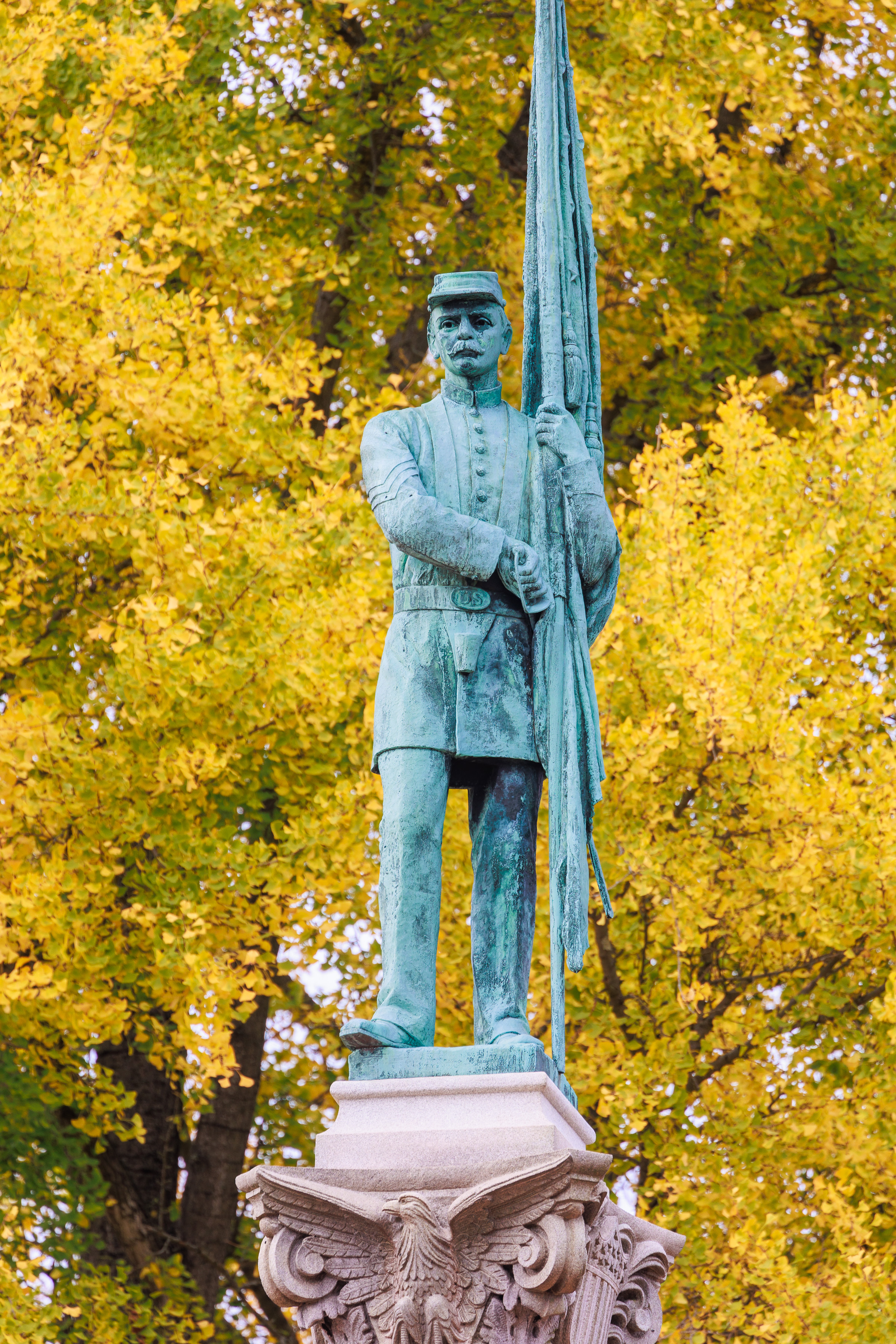
Soldiers and Sailors Monument

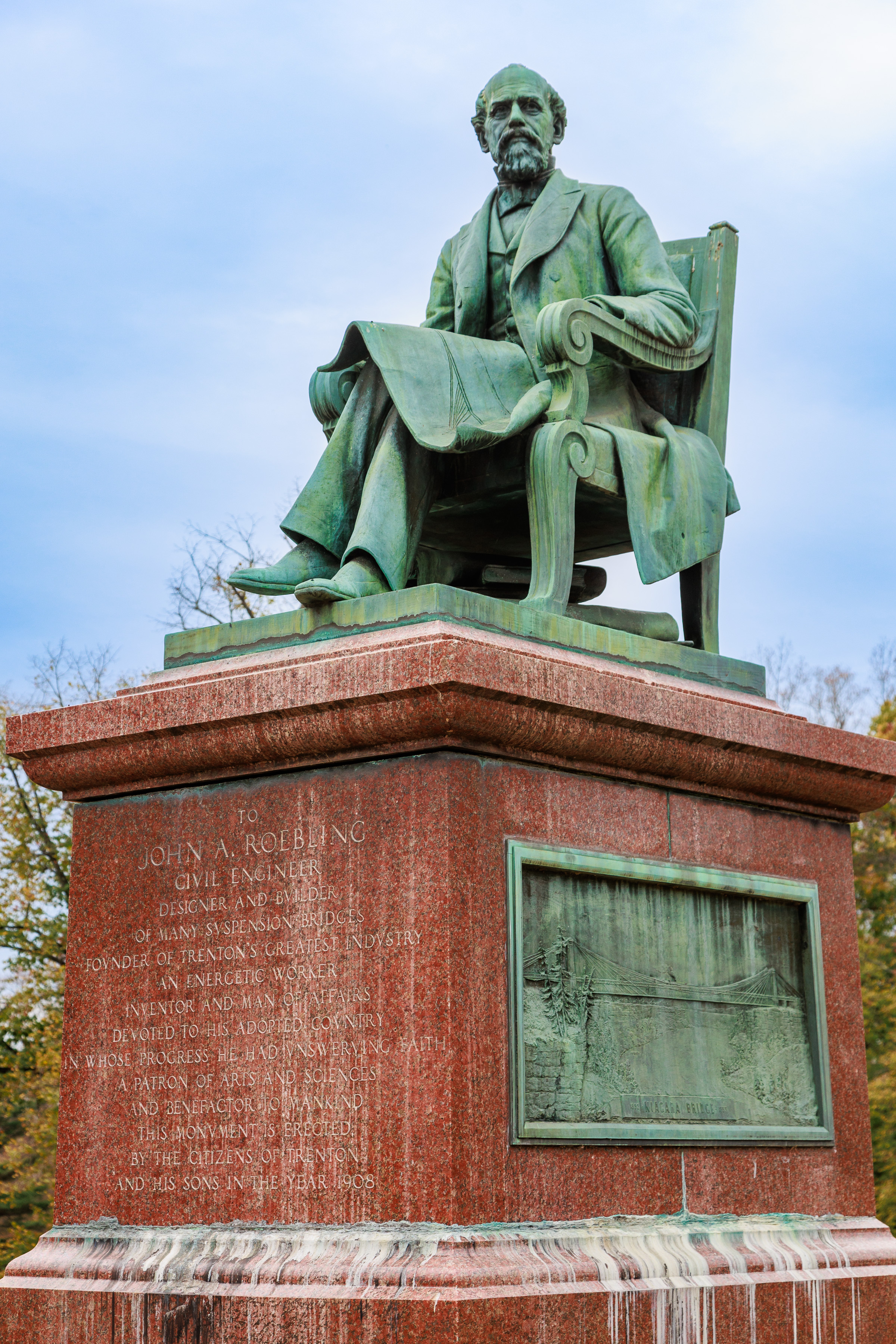
John A. Roebling Monument

Cadwalader Park is a city park located in Trenton, Mercer County, New Jersey, United States. The nearly 100 acres (0.40 km^{2}) green space is Trenton's oldest park. It is named for Thomas Cadwalader, who lived for a while near Trenton where he became the chief burgess in 1746. Trenton's "central park" was designed by Frederick Law Olmsted.

== History and description ==
Work on the park was begun in 1887, following the purchase of Ellarslie Mansion from George Farlee. A committee of the Common Council for the city of Trenton sought a location for what would become the City Park, and contacted Olmsted. Though perhaps best known for his design of Central Park in New York, Olmsted applied the same approach in the design of Cadwalader Park. The Mansion, which houses the Trenton City Museum, is at the center of the park.

At one time the park had a train stop along the long gone Belvidere-Delaware Railroad.

The park has a deer paddock, a stream, a small lake and hundreds of trees, including some that are rare at this latitude. An arm of the Delaware & Raritan Canal flows through the park. Neighborhoods bordering the park include Cadwalader Heights, Hiltonia, Hillcrest and Parkside.

The park contains a memorial to the fallen of the Civil War and the column of the Soldiers’ and Sailors’ Monument, erected in 1903. At one time this included a number of artillery pieces, now reduced to the plinthed barrel of the 'Swamp Angel', an 8 inch breech-loading Parrott rifle used to bombard Charleston in 1863. The gun burst on the 36th shell to be fired, which can still be seen today.

The park also contains a seated bronze statue of Trenton engineer John A. Roebling, erected in 1908.
