= Cadwaladr ap Rhys Trefnant =

Welsh poet

Cadwaladr ap Rhys Trefnant (fl. 1600) was a Welsh poet. Few of his works are thought to survive today. He is known to have written a number of poetical compositions in praise of various affluent Montgomeryshire family members, such as Sir Edward Herbert, Lord of Powys.
