= Mount Aragorn =

Mountain in the country of Canada

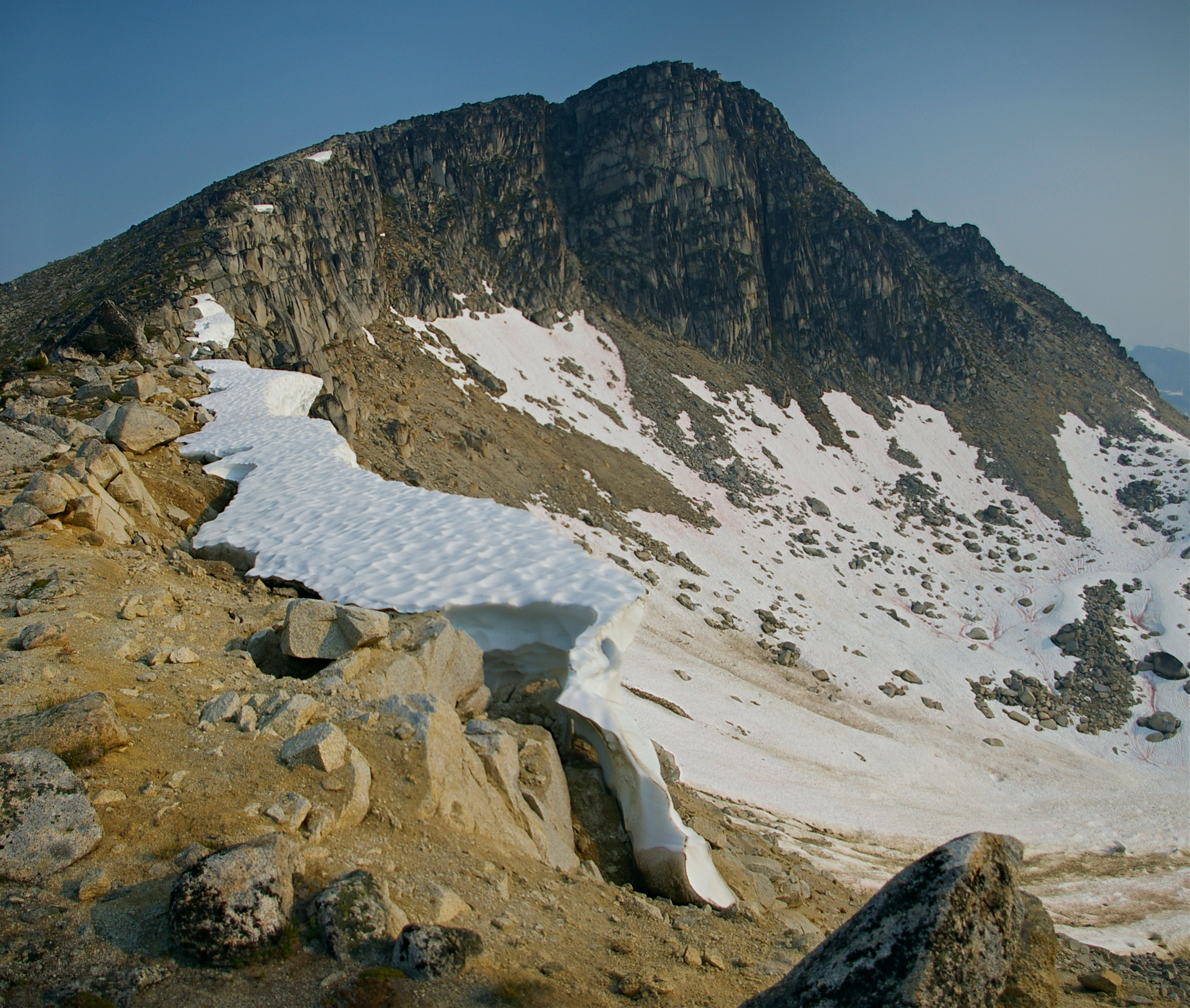
- Mount Aragorn from south ridge

Highest point
- Elevation: 2,435 m (7,989 ft)
- Prominence: 265 m (869 ft)
- Parent peak: Cadwallader Peak (2608 m)
- Listing: Mountains of British Columbia
- Coordinates: 50°38′33″N 122°42′22″W

Geography
- Location within British Columbia Location within Canada
- Interactive map of Mount Aragorn
- Location: British Columbia, Canada
- District: Lillooet Land District
- Parent range: Cadwallader Range; Coast Mountains
- Topo map: NTS 92J10 Birkenhead Lake

Geology
- Rock type: granite

Climbing
- First ascent: 1972 by Fred Thiessen, Eric White, Peter Jordan
- Easiest route: Scrambling via South Ridge

Mount Aragorn is a 2,435-metre (7,989-foot) mountain summit located in the Cadwallader Range in southwestern British Columbia, Canada. It is situated 36 km (22 mi) north of Pemberton, 56 km (35 mi) west of Lillooet, and immediately north of Mount Gandalf. Precipitation runoff from the peak drains into tributaries of the Fraser River.

== History ==
The first ascent of the mountain was made in 1972 by Peter Jordan, Fred Thiessen, and Eric White. This climbing party also made the first ascents of nearby Mount Gandalf and Mount Shadowfax. The names Aragorn, Gandalf, and Shadowfax were taken from fictional characters in the novels The Hobbit and The Lord of the Rings by J. R. R. Tolkien, which were read while waiting out stormy weather during the 1972 outing. The mountain's name was proposed in 1978 by Karl Ricker of the Alpine Club of Canada, and was officially adopted January 23, 1979, by the Geographical Names Board of Canada.

== Climate ==
Based on the Köppen climate classification, Mount Aragorn is located in a subarctic climate zone of western North America. Most weather fronts originate in the Pacific Ocean, and travel east toward the Coast Mountains where they are forced upward by the range (Orographic lift), causing them to drop their moisture in the form of rain or snowfall. As a result, the Coast Mountains experience high precipitation, especially during the winter months in the form of snowfall. Temperatures can drop below −20 °C with wind chill factors below −30 °C. The months July through September offer the most favorable weather for climbing Mount Aragorn.

== Climbing Routes ==
Established climbing routes on Mount Aragorn:

- North Face - class 5.10a
- East Ridge - class 3
- South Couloir - class 3
- South Ridge
- South Pillar - class 5.10

== Gallery ==
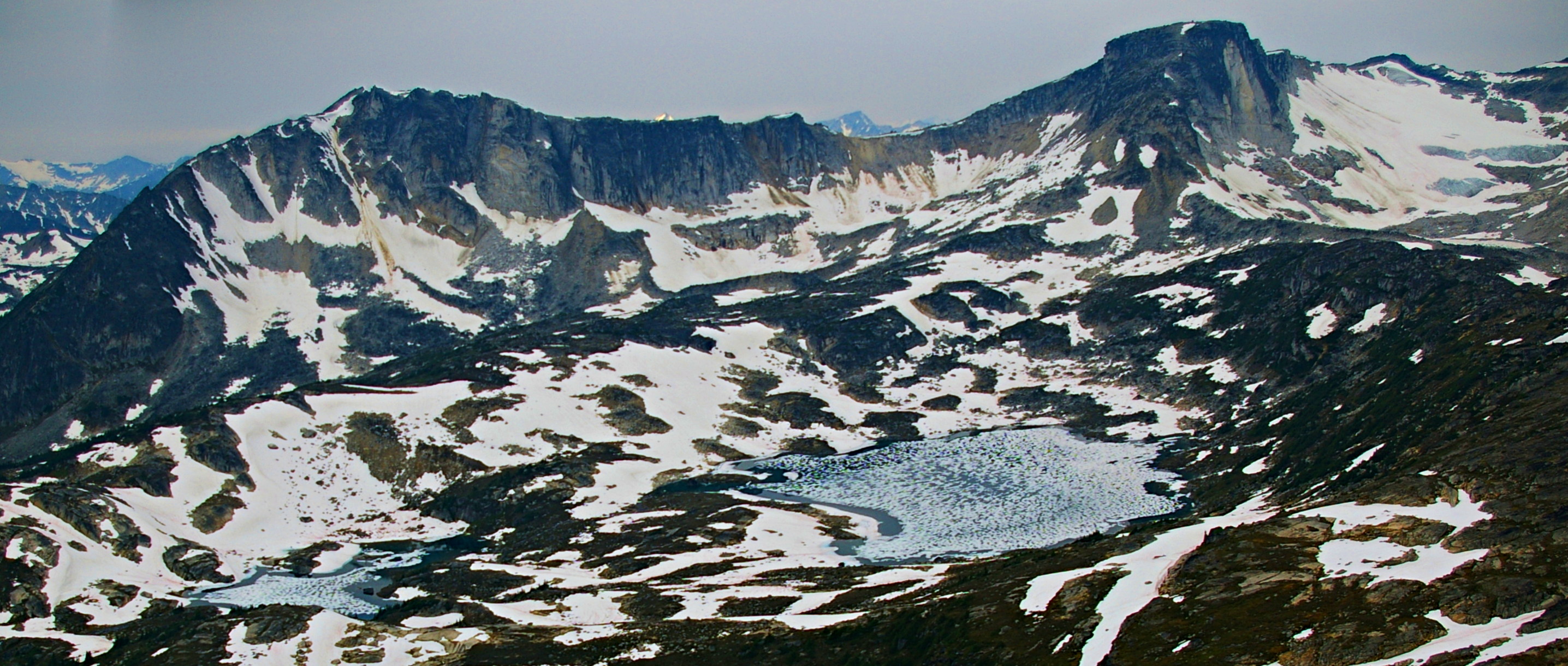
Mount Gandalf (left) and Mount Aragorn (right) seen from Mount Shadowfax

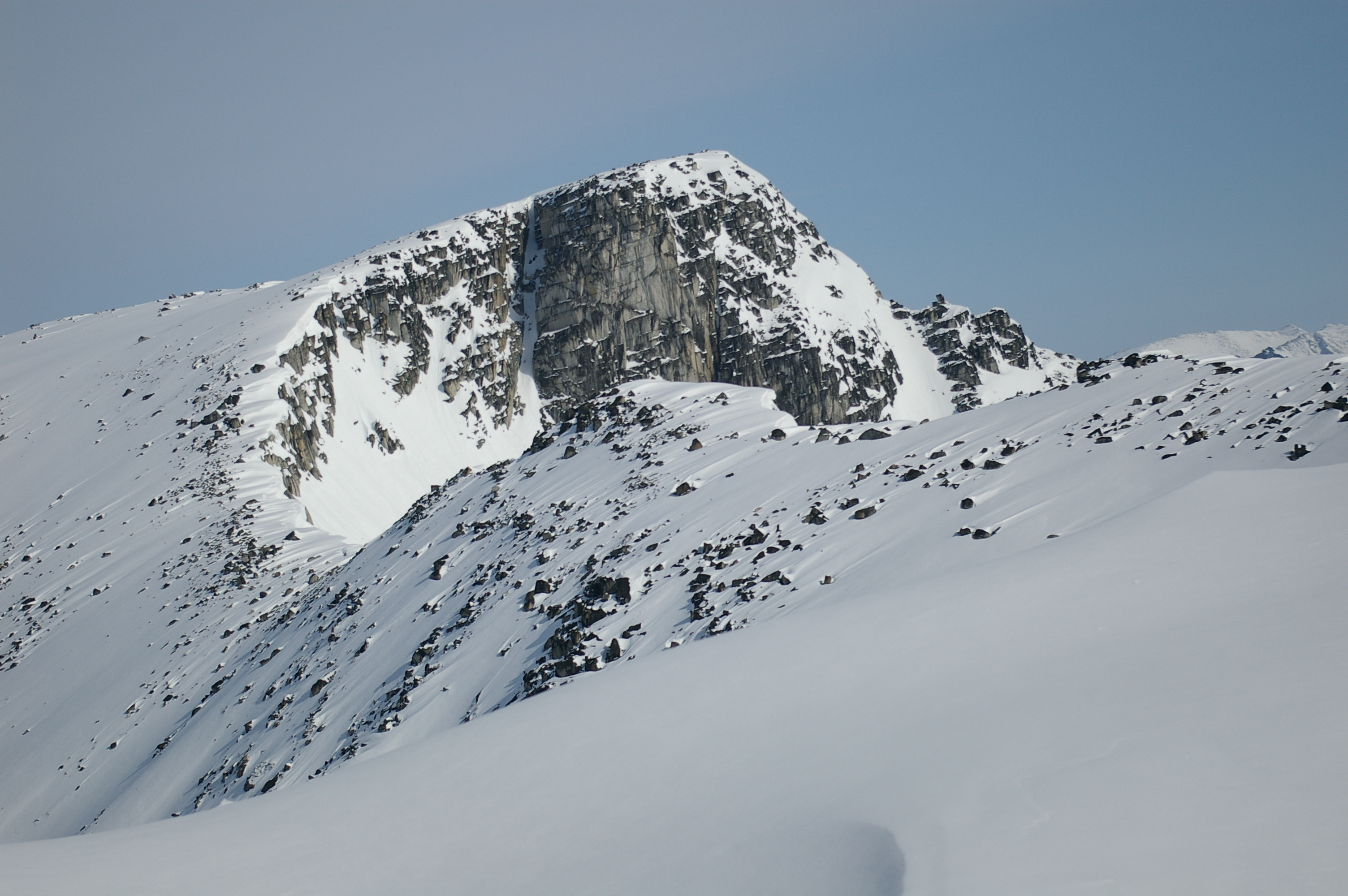
Mount Aragorn seen from Mount Gandalf

== See also ==
- Geography of British Columbia
- Geology of British Columbia
