= Ellis Cadwaladr =

Welsh poet

Ellis Cadwaladr (fl. 1707–1740) was a Welsh poet. He grew up in Llandderfel, Merionethshire. The content of some of his poems is thought to suggest that he had a good education. It is known that he won in the chair competition at the Eisteddfod held in Bala on Whit Monday, 1738. A number of his ballads, including 'Cerdd i ofyn Pâr o Ddillad o Rôdd Pendefig', and 'Cerdd o barchedigaeth urddasol Watkin Williams Wynne, Esq.', were printed in the 18th century.
