= Cadwaladr Cesail =

Welsh poet

Cadwaladr Cesail (fl. 1614–1626) was a Welsh poet.

Cesail is believed to have lived at Y Gesail Gyfarch, in Caernarfonshire. He wrote cywyddau and englynion to praise or eulogize members of prominent families, such as the Bodwrda family of Caernarvonshire . It is thought at least 27 of Cesail's cywydd poems and nine of his englyn poems may still survive.
