= Chilcotin (sternwheeler) =

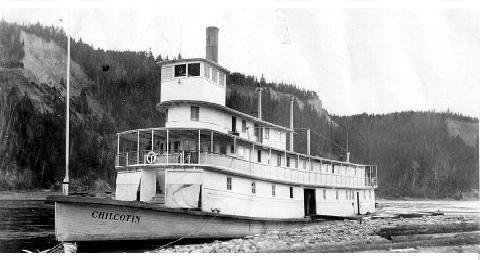
- Chilcotin at South Fort George 1914

History

Canada
- Name: Chilcotin
- Laid down: 1910 in Soda Creek, British Columbia
- Launched: July 20, 1910
- In service: 1910
- Out of service: 1914
- Fate: Retired 1914

General characteristics
- Type: Sternwheeler
- Length: 134.5 ft (41.0 m)
- Beam: 23.5 ft (7.2 m)
- Notes: No.126945

The sternwheeler Chilcotin was built for the Soda Creek to Fort George route of the upper Fraser River. She was built by shipbuilder Donald McPhee for the Fort George Lumber and Navigation Company, which was a partnership held by Nick Clarke and Russell Peden of the South Fort George town-site of Fort George. Chilcotin was the largest of the company's three sternwheelers and was intended to run as competition against the BC Express Company's new luxury sternwheeler, BX. Chilcotin had main, promenade and Texas decks, hot and cold running water and stateroom accommodation for fifty.

She was built at Soda Creek in late 1909 and early 1910, downstream from where the BC Express Company were building BX. A friendly rivalry quickly developed between the two construction camps and as soon as Chilcotin's builders learned that BX was going to be 5 feet (1.5 m) wider than Chilcotin, they teased the workers from the other camp, saying that BX would never fit through the narrow channels of the Cottonwood and Fort George canyons and called her the "White Elephant". This rumor spread far past the town of Soda Creek and soon the employees of the BC Express Company found themselves being consoled by their friends and associates for "having built a dud". However, BX proved to be a far superior craft and Chilcotin, was never much competition to her.

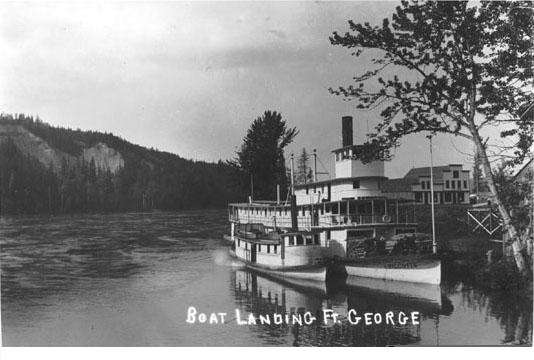
Chilcotin and Fort Fraser at South Fort George

Chilcotin was launched on July 20, 1910, and was put under the command of Captain Arthur Francis Dogherty. She made her first trip up to Fort George that August, but on the return trip to Soda Creek, she had an accident in the Fort George Canyon and had to be taken back to South Fort George. The vessel was laid up at South Fort George for the rest of the season.

In 1911, Chilcotin was overhauled and put under the command of DA Foster, who was also the captain of the sternwheeler Quesnel. That season she would make several trips up the Fraser to Giscome Portage and the Grand Canyon of the Fraser as well as working on the Soda Creek to Fort George route. However, unlike BX which could run this route on a twice-weekly basis, Chilcotin could only advertise a weekly service. Chilcotin worked on the upper Fraser until 1914, when, with the depressed economic conditions caused by World War I and the halting of the construction of the Pacific Great Eastern Railway, her owners decided to retire her.

== See also ==
- Steamboats of the Upper Fraser River in British Columbia
- List of ships in British Columbia
