= Robert C Hammond (sternwheeler) =

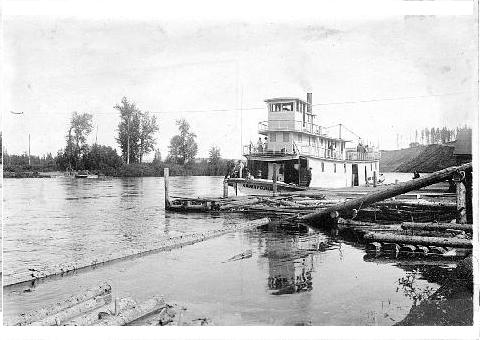
- Robert C Hammond at Central Fort George 1914

History

Canada
- Name: Robert C Hammond
- Laid down: 1913
- Launched: May 22, 1913 at Central Fort George
- In service: 1913–1914
- Fate: Retired, 1914

General characteristics
- Length: 101 ft (31 m)
- Beam: 21.5 ft (6.6 m)
- Notes: No.133979

Robert C Hammond was the last sternwheeler built for service on the upper Fraser and Nechako Rivers. She was owned by the Fort George Lake and River Transportation Company, a partnership of George Hammond and his brother. She was launched at the Central Fort George town-site of Fort George on May 22, 1913. She was built so that George Hammond, the promoter of Central Fort George, could claim that his community had steamer service. Central Fort George was on the Nechako River and the large sternwheelers owned by the BC Express Company, despite a $50 per trip inducement, could rarely call there, as there often were sandbars unless the water was very high. The rival sternwheelers of the South Fort George town-site owned by the Fort George Lumber and Navigation Company were not interested in helping George Hammond promote Central.

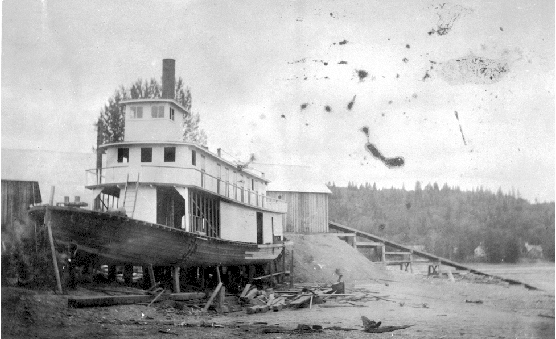
Robert C Hammond, 1913

In 1913, the Robert C Hammond made several trips on the Nechako as well as working on the route from Soda Creek to Fort George. For one auspicious moment in her short career, she was going to be a Royal Mail Ship for the newly formed Imperial Express Company which had been formed by Mayor JT Robinson of Kamloops and JC Shields of Vancouver, which had won the government mail contract from the BC Express Company. However, Imperial Express found themselves ill-prepared to meet this challenge and the BC Express Company consented to carry the mail for them for $500 a week. The Robert C Hammond continued its service until September 1914 when the depressed economic conditions caused by the Great War and the halt on the construction of the Pacific Great Eastern Railway caused her owners to retire her.

== See also ==
- Steamboats of the Upper Fraser River in British Columbia
- List of ships in British Columbia
