= Frank Swannell =

Canadian surveyor

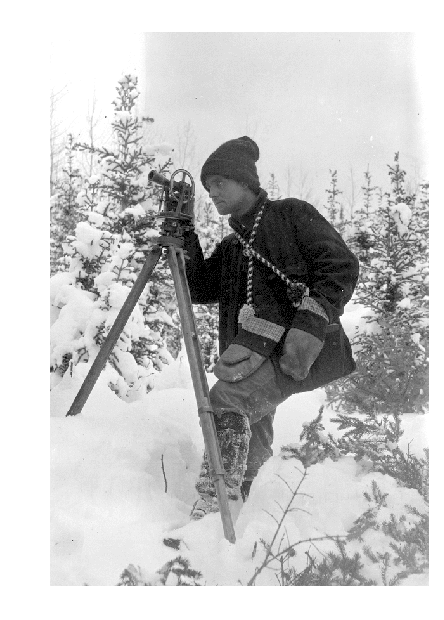
Frank Swannell 1910

Frank Cyril Swannell (May 16, 1880 in Hamilton, Ontario - 1969 in Victoria) was one of British Columbia's most famous surveyors.

He came to British Columbia during the era of the Klondike Gold Rush and became a surveyor's assistant. Then, from 1908, he was a professional surveyor and surveyed many regions of British Columbia. He kept a journal of his work and collected over 5000 unique pictures of the era, which were donated to BC Archives for the benefit of future researchers. The photographs span a period of more than 40 years and cover many areas of the province. Their subjects include stagecoaches, sternwheelers, old forts and remote villages, mountains and rivers, pioneer settlers, miners and First Nations people. Swannell's pictures are a priceless contribution to the history of British Columbia.

== Early years ==
Swannell graduated from high school in Toronto and then attended a two-year program in mining engineering at the University of Toronto from 1897-1899. In the summer of 1898, he worked for a surveying firm in New Denver, British Columbia. After he graduated, he intended to travel to the Yukon to participate in the Klondike Gold Rush, but instead obtained work with the Victoria surveyors, Gore and McGregor, receiving his Provincial Land Surveying licence and Dominion Land Surveying licence in 1903 and 1904 respectively. In 1908, Swannell left the firm and struck out on his own and soon gained a reputation for being among the best in the business.

== 1908-1914 ==
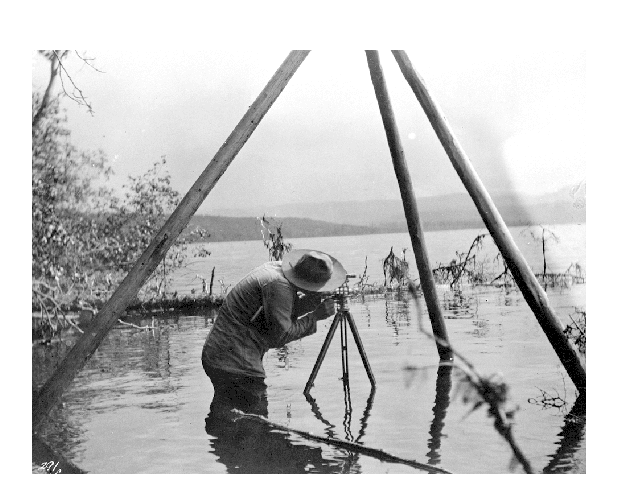
Frank Swannell at Takla Lake

The construction of the Grand Trunk Pacific Railway caused a great deal of interest in Central and Northern British Columbia, and settlers were arriving looking for agricultural land, which needed to be surveyed before it could be sold or pre-empted. The equipment the surveyors used would be considered simple by today's standards, but it was remarkably accurate: a transit and a 66-foot length of chain (80 lengths to a mile). The pioneer surveyors did more than survey land, they also recorded the topography, soil conditions and potential uses of the land, information that was a necessity for the government and land-seekers alike.

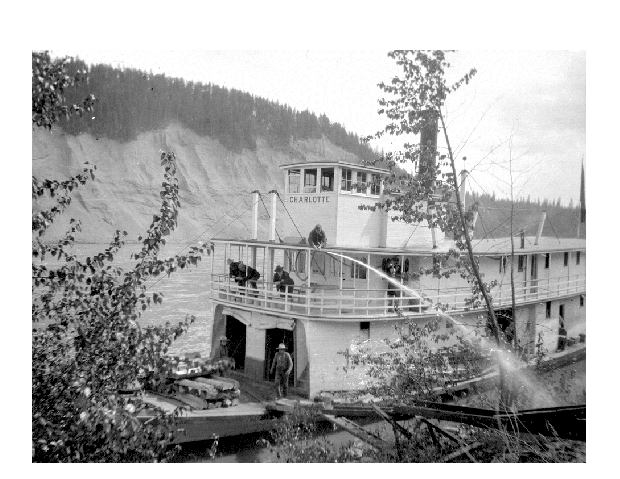
Charlotte on the Fraser River (1908)

In 1908, Swannell received the government contract to survey the Nechako Valley. Swannell and his crew worked in the summers and he kept his winter home in Victoria. When spring came, they would travel from Vancouver on the Canadian Pacific Railway to Ashcroft and take a stagecoach to Soda Creek where the sternwheeler Charlotte would take them to Quesnel. From Quesnel it was a ten-day hike along the Yukon Telegraph Trail to the Nechako Valley.

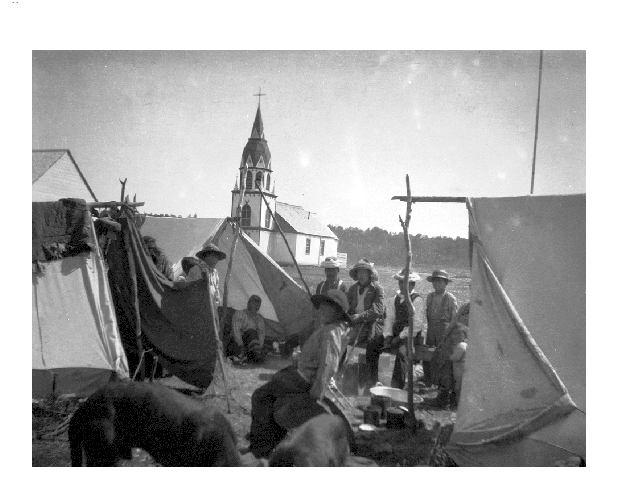
The surveyor's camp at Stoney Creek (1908)

Surveying British Columbia into the familiar 640 acre sections that are created by north to south range lines and east to west township lines was much more difficult than it was in many other areas of Western Canada. Survey lines had to be cut through dense wilderness, across swamps, lakes, rivers and over mountainous areas. Aside from surveying, Swannell also had to worry about keeping food supplies on hand for his crew, a problem which was quite often nearly insurmountable as there were few farms in the region and goods often took three weeks or longer to arrive from Hudson's Bay Company stores on pack trains or by canoe. During that first summer, Swannell and his crew surveyed the area around Fort Fraser, Fraser Lake and Stoney Creek.

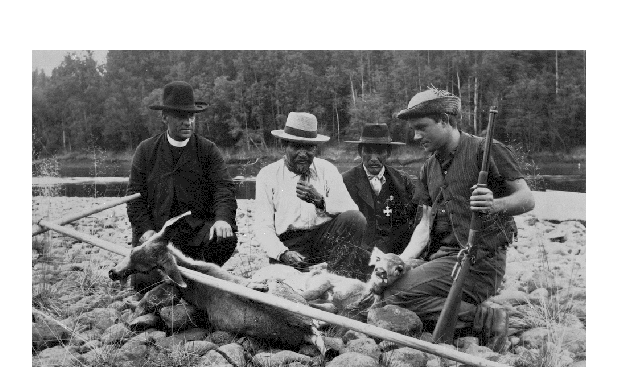
Frank Swannell with Father Coccola and the Chief from Fort George (1909)

In 1909, Swannell and his crew began the season by surveying lots in the Lillooet and Pemberton areas and several locations around Anderson and Seton Lakes. By July, they were finished and returned to Quesnel, transferring from the Charlotte to the new sternwheeler, Nechacco which was able to take the crew up the Fraser to Fort George and onto the Nechako River all the way to Fraser Lake. In August, Swannell traveled to Fort St. James and inspected the surrounding area, including Stuart Lake and Takla Lake. From there, Swannell traveled to Moricetown, Hazelton and Prince Rupert, taking many pictures of the pioneer communities and First Nations villages along the way before returning to his home in Victoria that November.

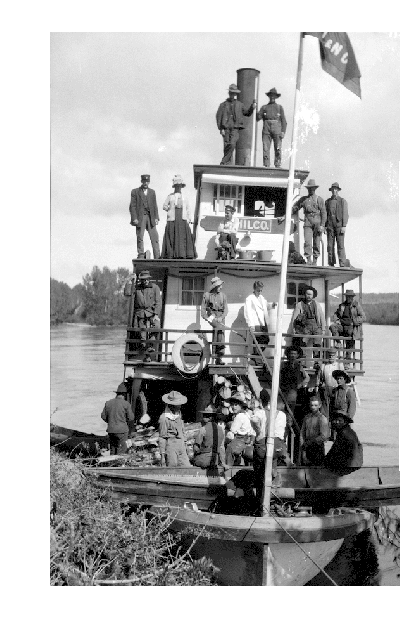
Frank's crew on the Chilco near Isle Pierre (1910)

In 1910, Swannell spent January and February working close to his home in Victoria, working on Saltspring Island. In March, he went to the Gordon River from Port Renfrew and in mid March continued on to more surveying at Atla Lake in the Whistler region. By early April Swannell had moved on to the Lillooet River. By July, he and his crew had returned to the Nechako Valley and surveyed the areas around Fraser Lake and the Nechako River and the Endako Valley. That year, Swannell left Endako in December, taking a 400-mile sleigh ride to Ashcroft to meet the CPR. He arrived home on New Year's Eve.

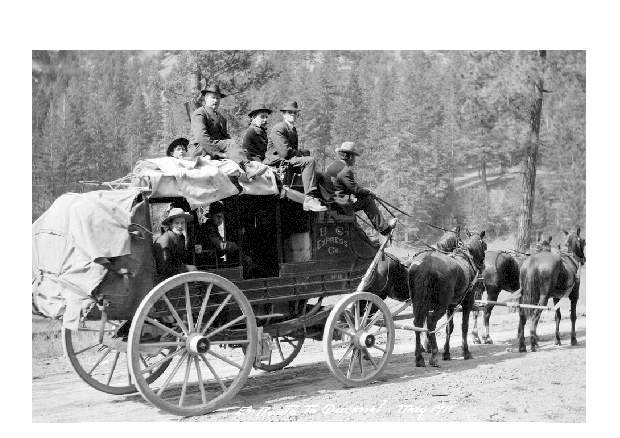
Frank Swannell and crew on a BC Express stage (1911)

In 1911, he completed some small government surveys around Victoria, as well as some surveying work for private interests. By March, he was back in the Lillooet region and returned to the Nechako Valley in mid May. Travel had already become more convenient in the years since they had begun work in the region and Swannell and his party took a BC Express Company stagecoach from Ashcroft to Soda Creek, where they boarded the BC Express Company's sternwheeler, BX. By the end of May, they arrived back in the Nechako region aboard the Fort Fraser and recommenced their surveying work in the area around Fort St. James.

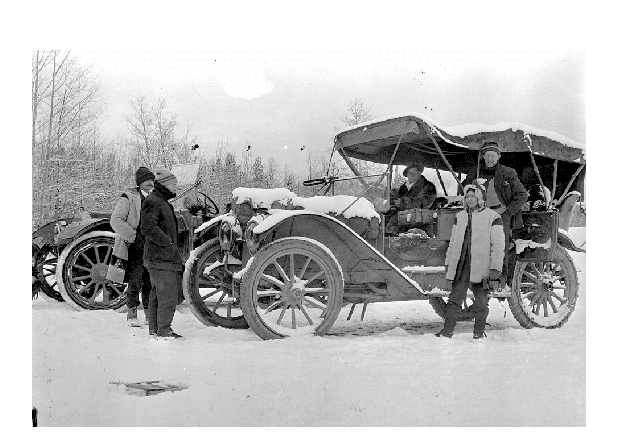
Frank Swannell at 105 Mile House (November 1912)

In 1912, Swannell won a large contract to survey the area around Nation Lake and throughout the surrounding Omineca Country. He and his crew would travel a total of 1,700 miles that season, most of it by raft, but some of them by a relative newcomer to the route into Northern British Columbia, the automobile.

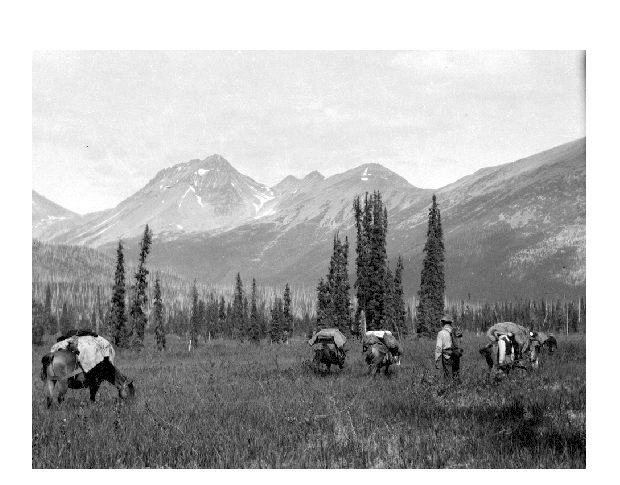
Swannell's pack train near the Omineca Mountains (1913)

In 1913, the Surveyor General, impressed with Swannell's progress in the Nechako and Omineca regions, sent him back to the area, with the intention of extending his surveys further north and east, further into the Omineca. Swannell resurveyed Mount Pope and Takla Lake and then surveyed the area around Fort Babine, Driftwood River and the Omineca River and the Finlay River. Swannell visited the Big Kettle Fumarole at the junction of Humar Creek and the Omineca River during his surveys and provided a description in his government report. Swannell's party travelled on the North-West Mounted Police Trail that ran between Fort Grahame and Bear Lake. On November 1, they travelled to Burns Lake from Fort St. James, and Swannell observed and photographed the ongoing construction of the Grand Trunk Pacific Railway, before travelling on to Prince Rupert and returning to Victoria.

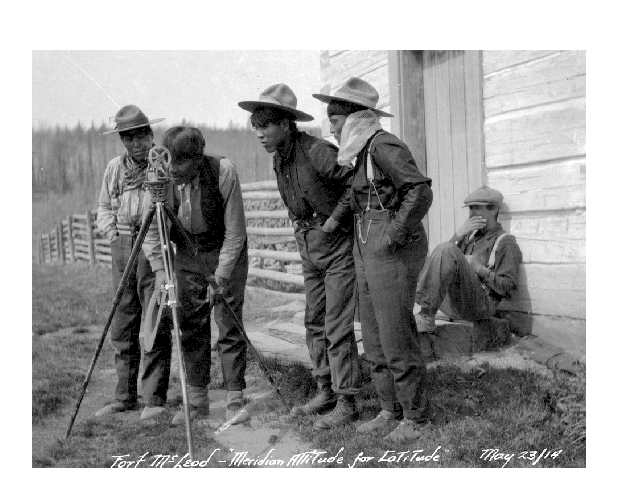
Frank Swannell at Fort McLeod (1914)

In 1914, Swannell and his crew returned to the Omineca region and recommenced the survey work around the Finlay River. Swannell decided to take a new route home that fall and traveled up the Peace River to Hudson's Hope and Fort St. John, eventually arriving at Lesser Slave Lake where they took the steamer Northland Sun to Sawridge, Alberta and then they drove to the train which took them to Edmonton and then continued home by rail.

== The Great War ==
Late in 1914, Swannell enlisted to fight in World War I and in 1919, joined an anti-Bolshevik force in Siberia where he was wounded in the shoulder.

== Bedaux expedition ==
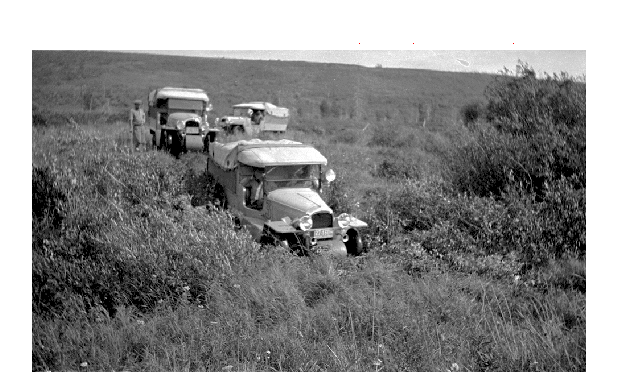
Bedaux expedition in the Peace River Country (August 1934).

Swannell was sent by the Canadian government to map the route of the ill-conceived Bedaux expedition of 1934. The expedition was intended to run 2,400 kilometers from Edmonton, Alberta to Telegraph Creek, British Columbia and was led by American Charles Bedaux, who was acquainted with car manufacturer, Andre Citroen, who designed the Kégresse track equipped half-track trucks Bedaux used on his journey. Aside from Bedaux and Swannell were fellow mapmaker, Ernest Lemarque, three women: Bedaux's wife, an Italian countess, and a maid, several cameramen, a group of cowboys from Alberta, and the man who would direct the film High Noon, filmmaker, Floyd Crosby. Of the five Citroens, two slid off of cliffs, one was sent downriver and the last two were abandoned. The expedition continued on horseback, but in late September, with winter fast approaching and the horses beginning to die of disease and starvation, Bedaux called a halt to the trip just short of their destination.

== Later years ==
Swannell died in Victoria in 1969.

== Places named after Swannell ==
- Swannell Ranges
- Swannell River
- Mount Swannell
