= Steamboats of the Upper Fraser River =

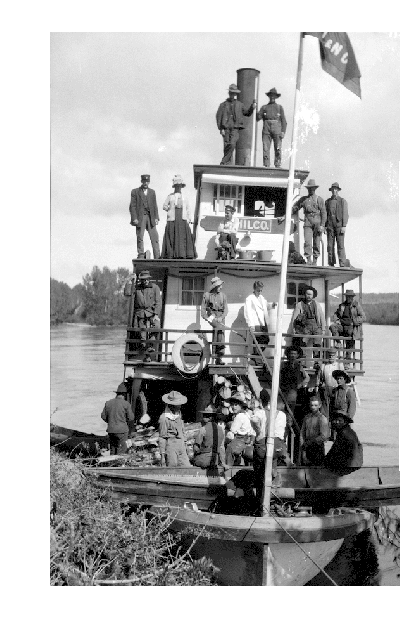
Chilco and crew with Frank Swannell's workers (1910)

Twelve paddlewheel steamboats plied the upper Fraser River in British Columbia from 1863 until 1921. They were used for a variety of purposes: working on railroad construction, delivering mail, promoting real estate in infant townsites and bringing settlers in to a new frontier. They served the towns of Quesnel, Barkerville and Fort George. Some only worked the Fraser from Soda Creek to Quesnel, while others went all the way to Tête Jaune Cache or took the Nechako River and served Fort Fraser and beyond.

== Pioneer sternwheelers - the Wright boats ==
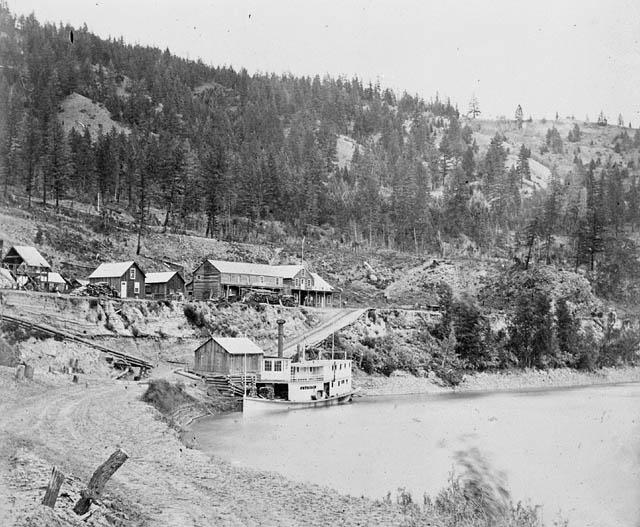
Enterprise at Soda Creek

The first steamer used on the upper Fraser River was the Enterprise. She was built in 1862 near Alexandria by James Trahey for her owners Captain Thomas Wright and Gustavus Blin Wright, who also were her operators. She ran between Soda Creek and Quesnel from 1863 until 1871 when the Wrights took her to Takla Landing for use in the Omineca Gold Rush. This voyage was to be her last and she was abandoned after she made the trip. The next steamboat used on the Soda Creek to Quesnel route was also built by Trahey for the Wrights. She was the Victoria, which was built in Quesnel and put into service in 1869. She served the district for seventeen years until she was berthed at Steamboat Landing near Alexandria.

== The Charlotte and the Quesnel ==
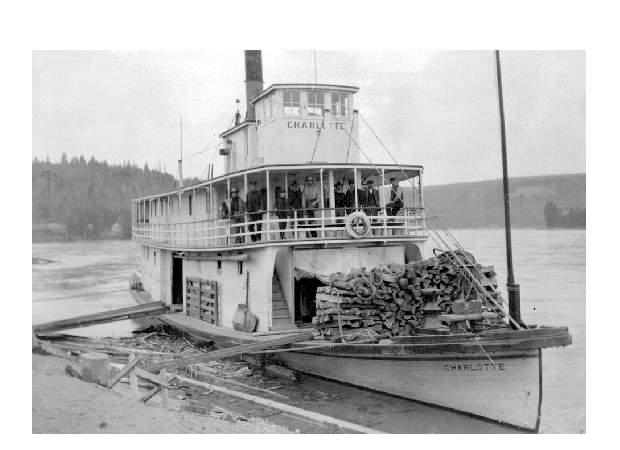
Charlotte at Quesnel (1898)

For ten years the area was without steamer service until the Charlotte was built by Alexander Watson for the North British Columbia Navigation Company in 1896. The N.B.C.N.C was organized by Senator James Reid of Quesnel, Captain John Irving of Victoria and Stephen Tingley of Ashcroft. Tingley, at this time had been the owner of the BC Express Company for eight years, having been the most famous of the "bull whips" of the Cariboo Road. They hired Captain Frank Odin to pilot her. He was her captain until 1906, when Captain Owen Forrester Browne became her pilot. The Charlotte was the only steamer on the upper Fraser until 1909 when it was announced the Grand Trunk Pacific Railway would be crossing the Fraser River at Fort George. The Quesnel was launched by Telesphore Marion, a pioneer merchant from the town of the same name. It would become the fourth sternwheeler to work the upper Fraser and would also be the last. Her pilot was Captain DA Foster.

== The Fort George Lumber and Navigation Company sternwheelers ==
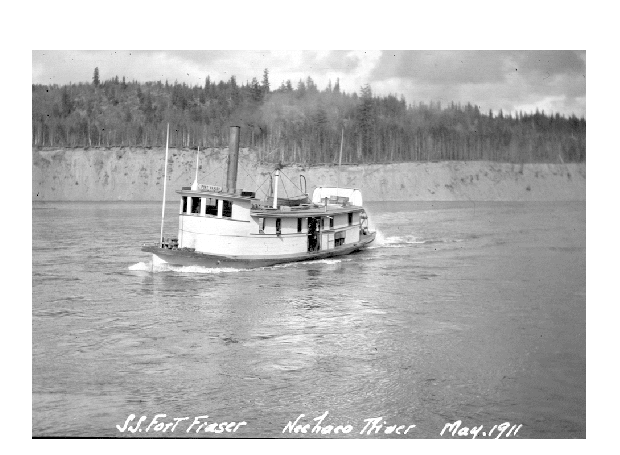
Fort Fraser (1911)

The Nechacco (which would later be renamed the Chilco shown in picture at top of page) joined the Charlotte and the Quesnel in May 1909. She was built by Donald McPhee for the Fort George Lumber and Navigation Company of South Fort George and was piloted by Captain John Bonser, an experienced swiftwater pilot from the Skeena River. The Nechacco would be the first sternwheeler to navigate the treacherous Grand Canyon of the Fraser. The Fort George Lumber and Navigation Company then built the Fort Fraser which pioneered the route to Tête Jaune Cache in 1910 and like the Chilco, she also made several trips on the Nechako River for Frank Swannell that summer. She would also be piloted by Captain Bonser, with Captain George Ritchie taking command of the Chilco for the latter part of the 1910 season of navigation. Unfortunately the Chilco would be lost in April 1911, torn apart in the icy waters of the Fraser near the Cottonwood Canyon. To compete against the BC Express Company's sternwheelers, the Fort George Lumber and Trading Company built a third sternwheeler, again by Donald McPhee in 1910, the Chilcotin. She was piloted by Captain Arthur Frances Dogherty.

== The BC Express Company's sternwheelers ==
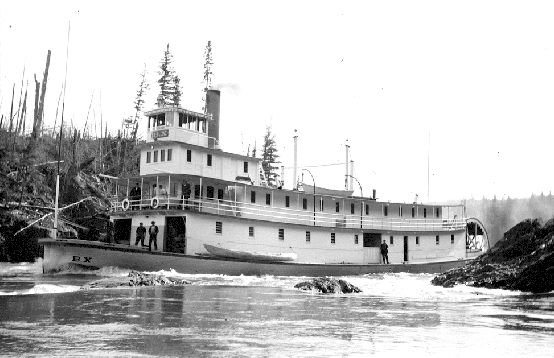
BX in Fort George Canyon (1911)

The BC Express Company, (which had been formerly known as Barnard's Express) had been freighting in the area since the 1860s during the Cariboo Gold Rush. They were also aware of the great changes that the railway would bring to this sparsely populated area. Thousands of construction workers would soon be working in-between Tête Jaune Cache and Fort George and millions of acres of land would be opened for settlement. The owner of the BC Express Company was now Charles Vance Millar who had purchased the company from Stephen Tingley in 1897. Millar decided to build two large and very luxurious steamers to accommodate the growing demand. Both were built at Soda Creek by Alexander Watson Junior, the son of the man who had built the Charlotte. The first company sternwheeler was launched in May 1910. It was named the BX and was piloted by Captain Owen Forrester Browne. She had stateroom accommodation for seventy and was also licensed to carry sixty deck passengers. Her paddlewheel was covered, so there was no backsplash, and a fine view could be enjoyed from the stern, which was where the ladies cabin was located. The BX boasted hot and cold running water and steam heat. She soon became the preferred steamer for passenger service and also won the government mail contract. Premier Richard McBride traveled on the BX in her sumptuous bridal suite, which featured, among other luxuries, a double brass bed with a silk eiderdown. She was the only steamer that could advertise a bi-weekly service from Soda Creek to Fort George. On Sunday and Wednesday mornings, she would leave Soda Creek at the break of dawn, usually 3am, and would reach Quesnel around noon. After unloading the mail and supplies for that town she would continue upriver until dark, tying up at a woodpile where her crew would have an opportunity to load more fuel aboard. This was called wooding up and it was a common activity. Most sternwheelers burnt upwards of four cords of wood an hour when they were travelling upstream and they could only carry three. She would arrive in Fort George the next day, usually around 11am. Her return trips downriver were far swifter, she would leave Fort George at 7am on Tuesdays and Saturdays, arriving in Soda Creek by 4;30pm of the same day.

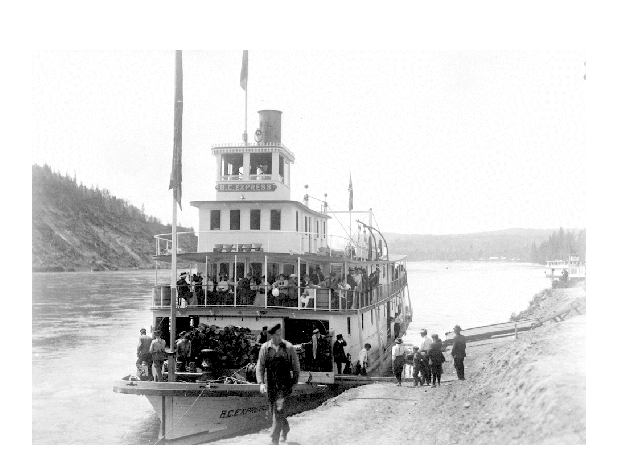
BC Express (1913)

For the 1911 season of navigation, the BC Express Company built a second sternwheeler, the BC Express which was nearly identical to the BX, only slightly smaller and lacking the covered paddlewheel. Her pilot was Captain Joseph P Bucey. The BC Express worked the route from Fort George to Tête Jaune Cache until 1913 and then joined her sister ship, the BX, on the Soda Creek to Fort George route, where they both worked on the construction of the Pacific Great Eastern Railway. In 1915, only the BX worked on the Fraser, and in '16 and '17 there were none at all. The BX returned to the river in 1918, still under Captain Browne, and was joined, when the need arose, by the BC Express.

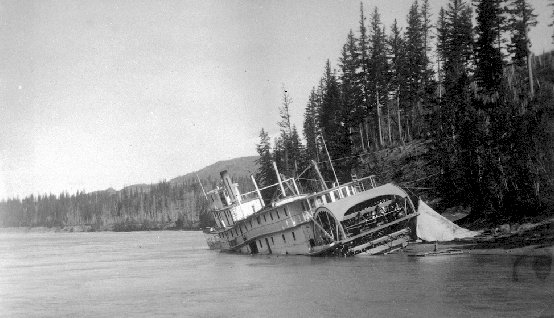
BX sunk at Woodpecker (1919)

Then, in August 1919, the BX struck a reef named "Woodpecker" and sank in the Fort George Canyon while carrying 100 tons of concrete. Her sister ship towed her back to Quesnel for salvage but she never sailed again.

== George Hammond's sternwheeler ==
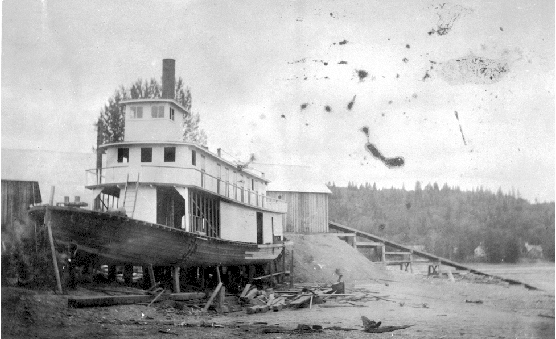
Robert C Hammond (1913)

The Central Fort George townsite promoter, George Hammond, started the Fort George Lake and River Transportation Company and built the tenth sternwheeler, the Robert C Hammond. It was built so that Hammond's claim to potential buyers that his community had sternwheeler service could be based on fact. Hammond had tried to hire the BC Express boats to visit his community but unfortunately, the Nechako River was often too low for these boats to navigate.

== The Grand Trunk Pacific's sternwheelers ==
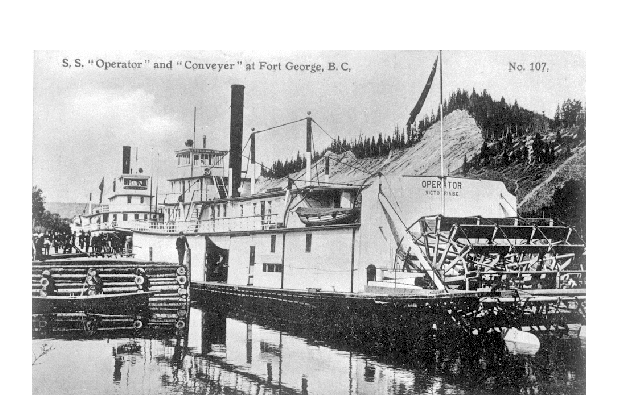
Operator and Conveyor at South Fort George (1913)

When the Grand Trunk Pacific Railway reached Tête Jaune Cache in 1912, they were able to use their own sternwheelers to transport workers and supplies up and down the river. The Operator and the Conveyor had worked on the Skeena River and were dismantled at Victoria. Their machinery and boilers were hauled up by rail to Jasper, Alberta and then hauled by mule wagon to Tête Jaune Cache where they were reassembled for use on the stretch of the river between there and Fort George. Their captains were Captain 'Con' Myers and Captain Jack Shannon, respectively. When their work was completed their machinery was recycled and the hulls were left at the shore of the Fraser River near Prince George.

== The end of an era ==
The Quesnel was the last sternwheeler on the upper Fraser, Captain Foster piloted her for the last time in April 1921 and then she was wrecked on the rocks of the Fort George Canyon.

== See also ==
- Steamboats of the lower Fraser River and Harrison Lake
- List of ships in British Columbia
- Steamboats of the Skeena River
- Steamboats of the Columbia River

== References and further reading ==
- Downs, Art (1971). Paddlewheels on the Frontier Volume 1. Foremost Publishing. ISBN 0-88826-033-4.
- Christensen, Bev (1989). Prince George: Rivers, Railways and Timber. Windsor Publications. ISBN 0-89781-266-2.
- West, Willis (1985). Stagecoach and Sternwheel Days in the Cariboo and Central BC. Heritage House. ISBN 0-919214-68-1.
- Leonard, Frank (1996). A Thousand Blunders: The History of the Grand Trunk Pacific Railway in Northern British Columbia. UBC Press. ISBN 0-7748-0552-8.
- West, Willis (1949). BX and the Rush to Fort George. BC Historical Quarterly.
- Koppel, Tom (1995). Kanaka:The Untold Story of Hawaiian Pioneers in British Columbia and the Pacific Northwest. Whitecap Books. ISBN 1-55110-295-1.
- Runnalls, Reverend Francis Edwin (1946). A History of Prince George. Prince George: the author.
- Walker, Russell. Bacon, Beans and Brave Hearts.
