= Giscome Portage =

- Location of Giscome Portage in British Columbia
- Coordinates: 54°14′33″N 122°35′01″W
- Country: Canada
- Province: British Columbia

The Giscome Portage was a portage between the Fraser River and Summit Lake, which connected with the river route to the Peace Country via Finlay Forks. BC Parks administers the Giscome Portage Trail Protected Area. The Huble Homestead Historic Site, at the south end, is on the Fraser River, 40 kilometres (25 mi) north of Prince George and 6 kilometres (3.7 mi) off Highway 97.

== 1800s ==
Simon Fraser’s journals (1806) make the first reference to a portage in the vicinity. The Lheidli T'enneh called the trail "Lhedesti" meaning "the shortcut". In 1862, John Giscome and Harry McDame, approached the Lheidli T'enneh at Fort George regarding a suitable route to the Peace River Country, where the two men planned to prospect for gold. The next year, a guide from the tribe led them across the nine-mile-long portage and John Giscome later wrote an article for a Victoria newspaper. Despite the newspaper coverage, the trail saw little use until the height of the Omineca Gold Rush in 1871, when nearly 400 miners successfully petitioned the government to build a wagon road over the portage to facilitate travel to the goldfields. The contract for building the road was awarded to Gustavus Blin Wright, who widened the trail at a cost of $9,070.

Peter Dunlevy, who operated a store at Soda Creek and Fort George, opened a store at the south end on the river in 1873, naming the portage after John Giscome, his cook. Sandford Fleming’s Canadian Pacific Railway survey investigated the portage as a railway route, and Charles Horetzky and Marcus Smith commented favourably upon its low altitude. Alfred Selwyn and George Dawson of the Geological Survey of Canada used and reported on the portage, with Dawson showing both the Salmon and Giscome Portages on his 1879 map. Dunlevy’s trading post closed about 1895 when Peace River freight generally travelled via the railhead at Edmonton. By this time, most of the miners had left for other gold strikes and the road fell into disrepair.

== 1900s ==
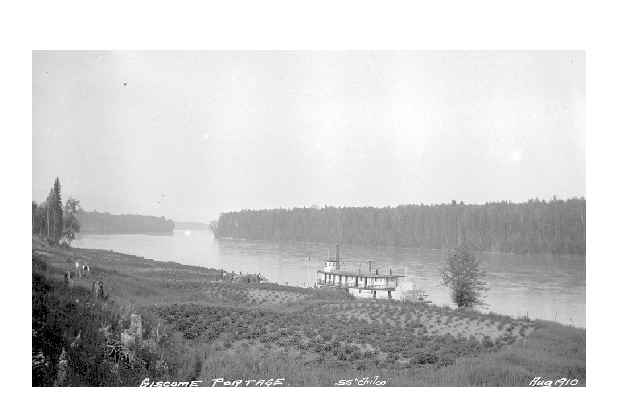
Chilco at Giscome Portage 1910

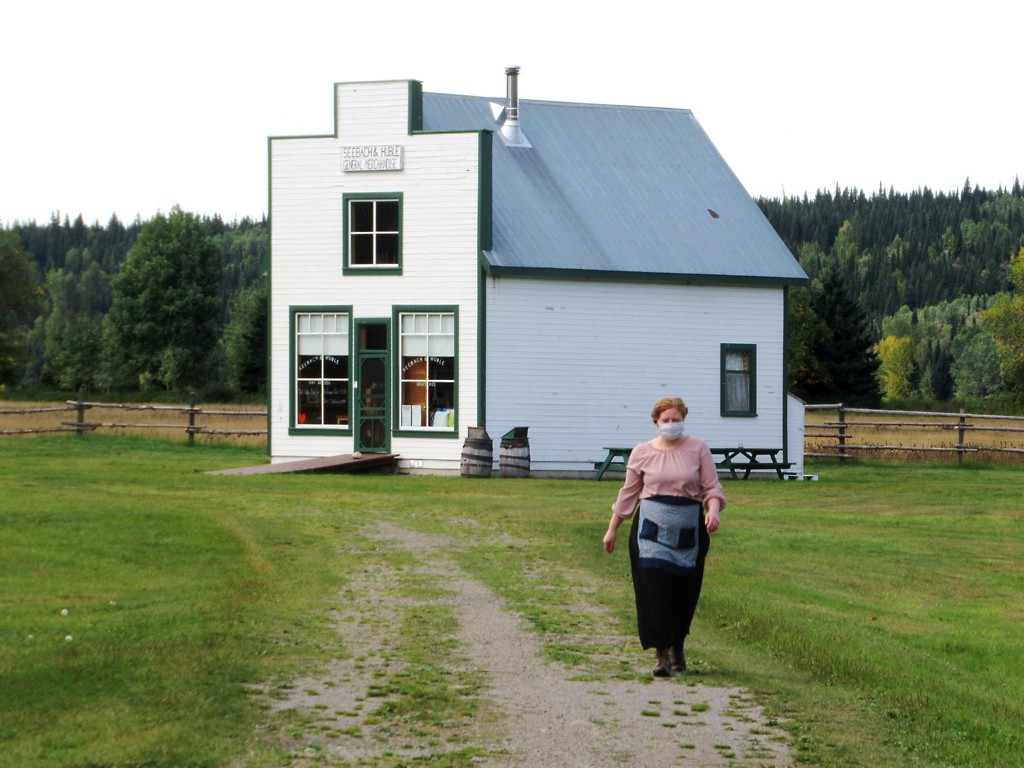
the restored Huble Homestead Store as was in 1903-1916

In 1903, Ontarians Albert Huble and Edward Seebach established a trading post at the south end of the Giscome Portage. Huble pre-empted the land, and the men built cabins, a barn and a store. They also re-cut the trail, making it wide enough for a horse-drawn wagon. They transported their supplies from Fort George, on horseback in the summer or by dog team or snowshoes in the winter. After 1909, the area experienced new growth with the Grand Trunk Pacific Railway's plans to cross the province at Fort George and the arrival of the Chilco, one of twelve sternwheelers operating as far as Tête Jaune. The steamboats of the Upper Fraser River, which regularly stopped at the portage, purchased vegetables and meat. Huble, who conveyed goods to Summit Lake, also guided travellers through the Giscome Rapids.

When the river was frozen in winter, the 27 settlers drew lots to determine who would walk the 41-mile trail from Giscombe landing to the South Fort George post office to collect their mail. Seebach and Huble advertised that all steamboats called at their Giscombe landing. In 1912, the partnership sold 4,500 acres to British Empire Land for subdivision. During 1914, Seebach (Seeback alternate spelling) and Huble (Hubble alternate spelling), and George McDowell, their agent, regularly advertised their weekly passenger and freight motorboat service, which travelled as far upriver as Mile 194 (Upper Fraser).

In 1914, the outbreak of World War I brought a dramatic decrease in business. During 1915, the steamer Quesnel connected downriver with Prince George. The post office operated November 1 to December 31, 1915 and the store closed in 1919. That year, the opening of the Prince George–Summit Lake wagon road superseded this route. Possibly triggered by falling business, 1920 advertisements promoted the upriver run to the Salmon River Sawmill, which was about the 6.4 kilometres (4 mi) southeast of the Hansard Bridge and 0.5 kilometres (0.3 mi) northwest of Dewey. In 1929, Mrs. E. Walker Mitchell acquired the Huble property, which became the W.M. Ranch in 1957.

With the aid of government grants and local fundraising, the Giscome Portage Historical Society (formed in 1983) restored the store and homestead.
