= Charlotte (sternwheeler) =

1896 sternwheeler built by Alexander Watson

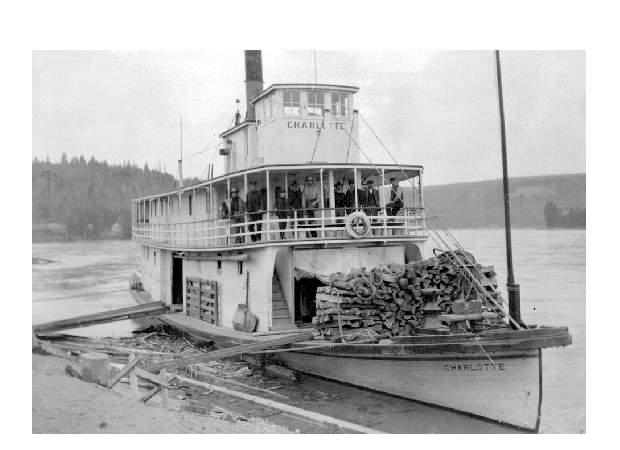
- Charlotte at Quesnel 1898

History

Canada
- Name: Charlotte
- Builder: Alexander Watson
- Laid down: 1896
- Launched: August 3, 1896
- In service: 1896
- Out of service: 1910
- Fate: Wrecked at Fort George Canyon, salvaged and abandoned at Quesnel in 1910

General characteristics
- Type: Sternwheeler
- Length: 126 ft (38.4 m)
- Beam: 23 ft (7.0 m)
- Notes: No. 103909

The sternwheeler Charlotte was built in 1896 by Alexander Watson for the Northern British Columbia Navigation Company (NBCNC). The partners of the NBCNC were Stephen Tingley, Senator James Reid and John Irving. She was launched on August 3, 1896, and christened by James Reid's wife after whom she'd been named.

== Soda Creek to Quesnel ==
The Charlotte was built to serve the route from Soda Creek to Quesnel on the upper Fraser River and was a far superior craft than either of her predecessors, the Enterprise and the Victoria which had worked that route during the 1860s through to the 1880s. The Charlotte's first captain was Frank Odin. Due to her late launch, her first season was a short one and nearly disastrous. In mid November, Odin had taken her for one last run from Quesnel to Soda Creek and was on the way back when he discovered that ice was running down the river. Odin was forced to tie her up at Steamboat Landing near Alexandria, right in front of where the old hulk of the Victoria was. Not wanting to leave the Charlotte in the frozen river over the winter, her owners decided to buy the wreck from its owner, Robert McLeese, so the Charlotte could be safely berthed in her place.

For the next twelve years the Charlotte plied the route between Soda Creek and Quesnel, delivering the mail and other cargo for the pioneer communities. Her owners saw little need to take her any further north and risk her in the Cottonwood or Fort George canyons. However, by 1907, it was widely known that the Grand Trunk Pacific Railway would be coming through the province via the Yellowhead Pass and would be going right through Fort George. Tingley, Reid and Irving began considering the feasibility of extending the Charlotte's route further north. Though the Enterprise had successfully navigated those two canyons on her historic trip to Takla Lake thirty-six years earlier, the Charlotte's owners knew that in no ways guaranteed that a regular route could be maintained without great risk. The town of Quesnel was also planning to build a river steamer, one that would be launched for the season of 1909. Local man, Captain DA Foster was to be her pilot and upon inspecting the canyons in late 1907, he petitioned the federal government for funds to remove the obstacles to navigation. His petition was granted and he received $13,000 for this purpose and personally supervised the clean-up of the two canyons. In light of these improvements and the news of the impending railway, the Charlotte's owners gave her an overhaul, widening the bores of her engine and replacing her old manual capstan with a powerful steam-driven one. During this period they also hired Captain Owen Forrester Browne to be her pilot. Throughout the navigating season of 1908, Captain Browne took the Charlotte to the foot of the Cottonwood Canyon several times and became familiar with the area. Finally, after much consultation with some of the local First Nations, Browne decided to attempt the trip.

== Soda Creek to Fort George ==
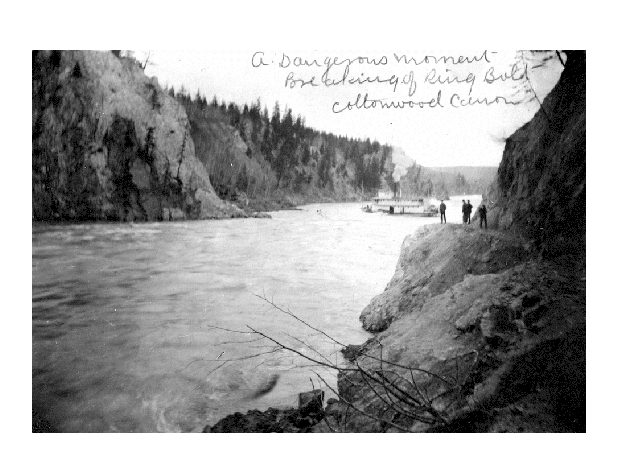
A dangerous moment: breaking of the ringbolt

On the Charlotte's first trial attempt through the canyons in the fall of 1908, Captain Browne was joined by one of the Charlotte's owners, Captain Irving. Armed with her powerful new capstan and a good supply of dry cordwood, the Charlotte was taken to the foot of the Cottonwood Canyon where her crew attached a line to a newly placed ringbolt and Browne began to line her through. She had nearly reached the head of the canyon, when the ringbolt gave way and the Charlotte went crashing backwards through the canyon. Captain Browne reacted quickly to the crisis, guiding the sternwheeler narrowly past a pile of rocks where she would have been torn open and immediately sank.

After the near accident, Browne and Irving returned to Quesnel and put their own petition in to the government for funds, this time to blast away a large rock that was confining the current in the Cottonwood Canyon. Browne was sure that once this menace was removed, the canyon could be navigated. The funds were issued and the canyon was ready for the 1909 season of navigation. By that spring the Charlotte was joined by two other river steamers, the Quesnel, that Captain Foster had been planning, and the Nechacco, owned by the Fort George Lumber and Navigation Company. All three steamers were able to navigate the full route from Soda Creek to South Fort George. By 1910, three others had joined the fleet, the BX, Chilcotin and Fort Fraser. The Charlotte met with several small accidents that summer and then one major one on 15 July, when she hit a reef in the Fort George Canyon and sank. The damage was so extensive that it was October before she was salvaged and taken to Quesnel. Upon assessing the cost of repairing her, and knowing that the little pioneer steamer could not compete against the bigger and more modern BX, her owners decided that any further investment in her could not be justified and she was abandoned on the riverbank at Quesnel.

== See also ==
- Steamboats of the Upper Fraser River in British Columbia
- List of ships in British Columbia

== References and further reading ==
- Downs, Art (1971). Paddlewheels on the Frontier Volume 1. Foremost Publishing. ISBN 0-88826-033-4.
- West, Willis (1985). Stagecoach and Sternwheel Days in the Cariboo and Central BC. Heritage House. ISBN 0-919214-68-1.
- West, Willis (1949). The BX and the Rush to Fort George. British Columbia Historical Quarterly.
- Koppel, Tom (1995). Kanaka: The Untold Story of Hawaiian Pioneers in British Columbia and the Pacific Northwest. Whitecap Books. ISBN 1-55110-295-1.
