= Paddlewheel Park =

Small city park on the Fraser River, Canada

Coordinates: 53.8989°N 122.7365°W

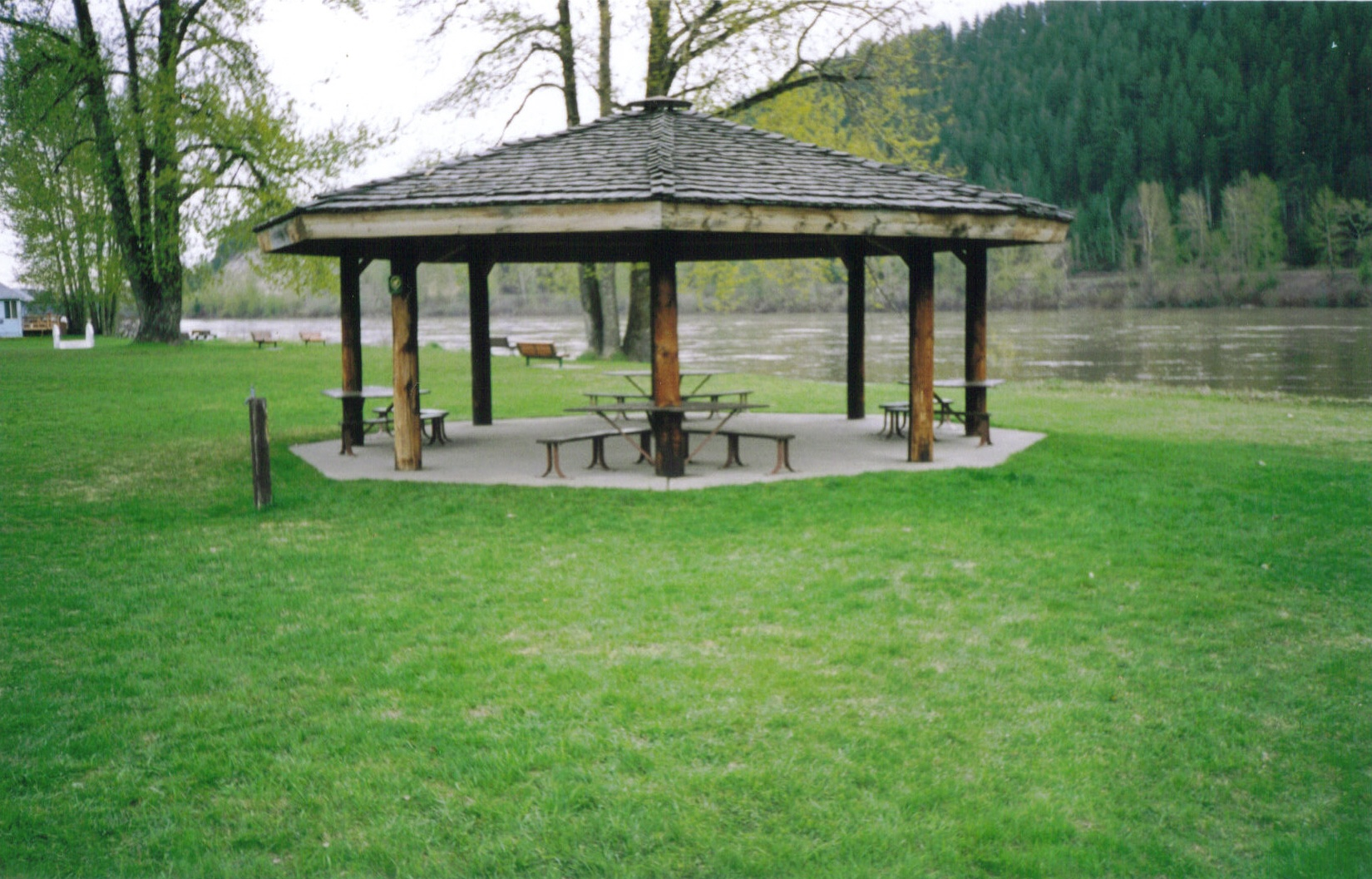
Gazebo at Paddlewheel Park

Paddlewheel Park is a small city park on the Fraser River in Prince George, British Columbia, Canada. The park was built in honor of the upper Fraser River sternwheelers that landed there from 1909 until 1921.

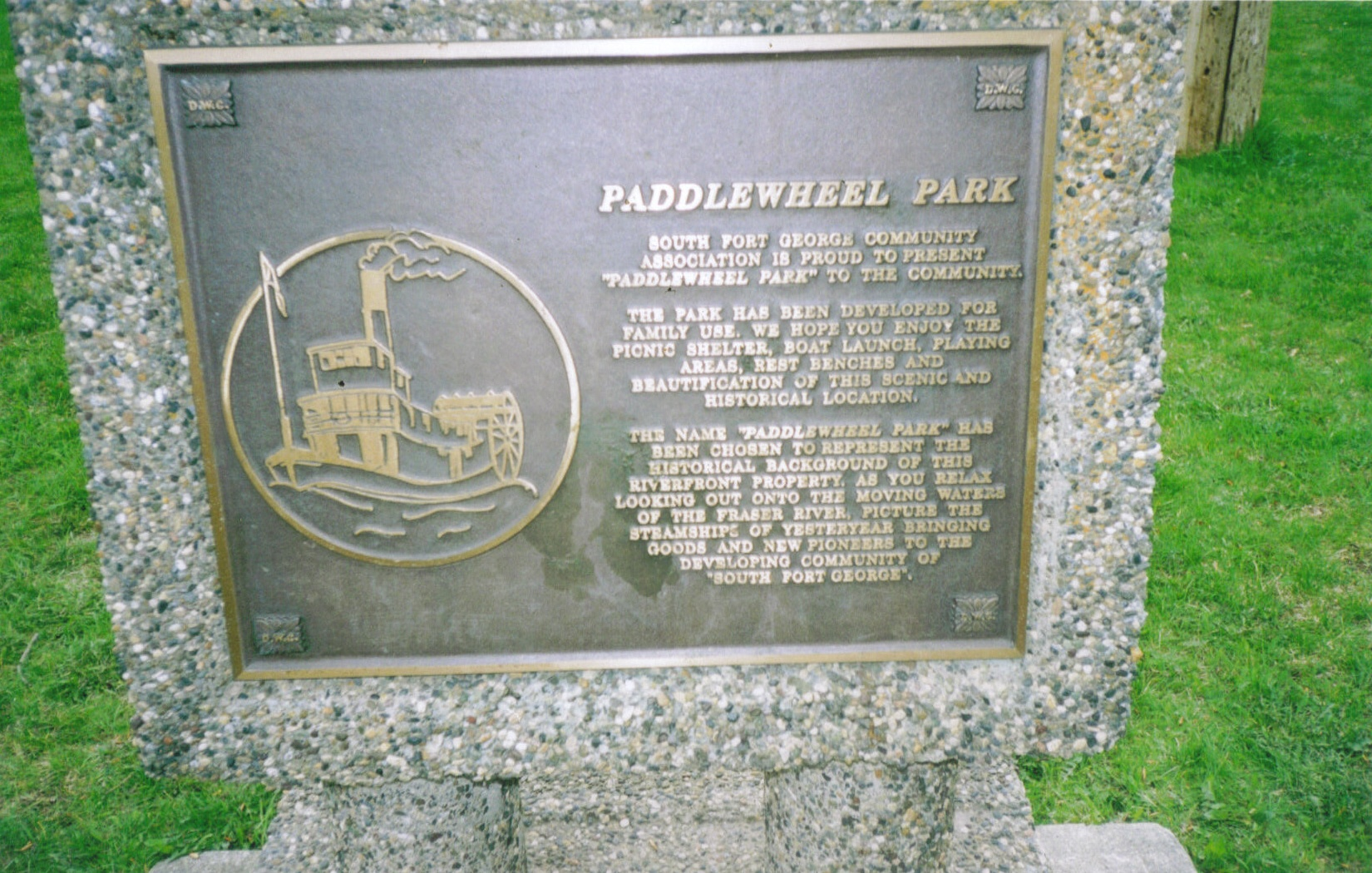

The park is located at the foot of Hamilton Avenue in historic South Fort George. Hamilton Avenue is named after pioneer storekeeper Alexander Hamilton. The local office and warehouse of the BC Express Company were located there from 1910 until 1921. Hamilton Avenue was also the address of the Hotel Northern which, during the era of Grand Trunk Pacific Railway construction, was one of the busiest hotels in British Columbia, often enjoying sales of $7000 per day, at a time when drinks were 25 cents apiece.

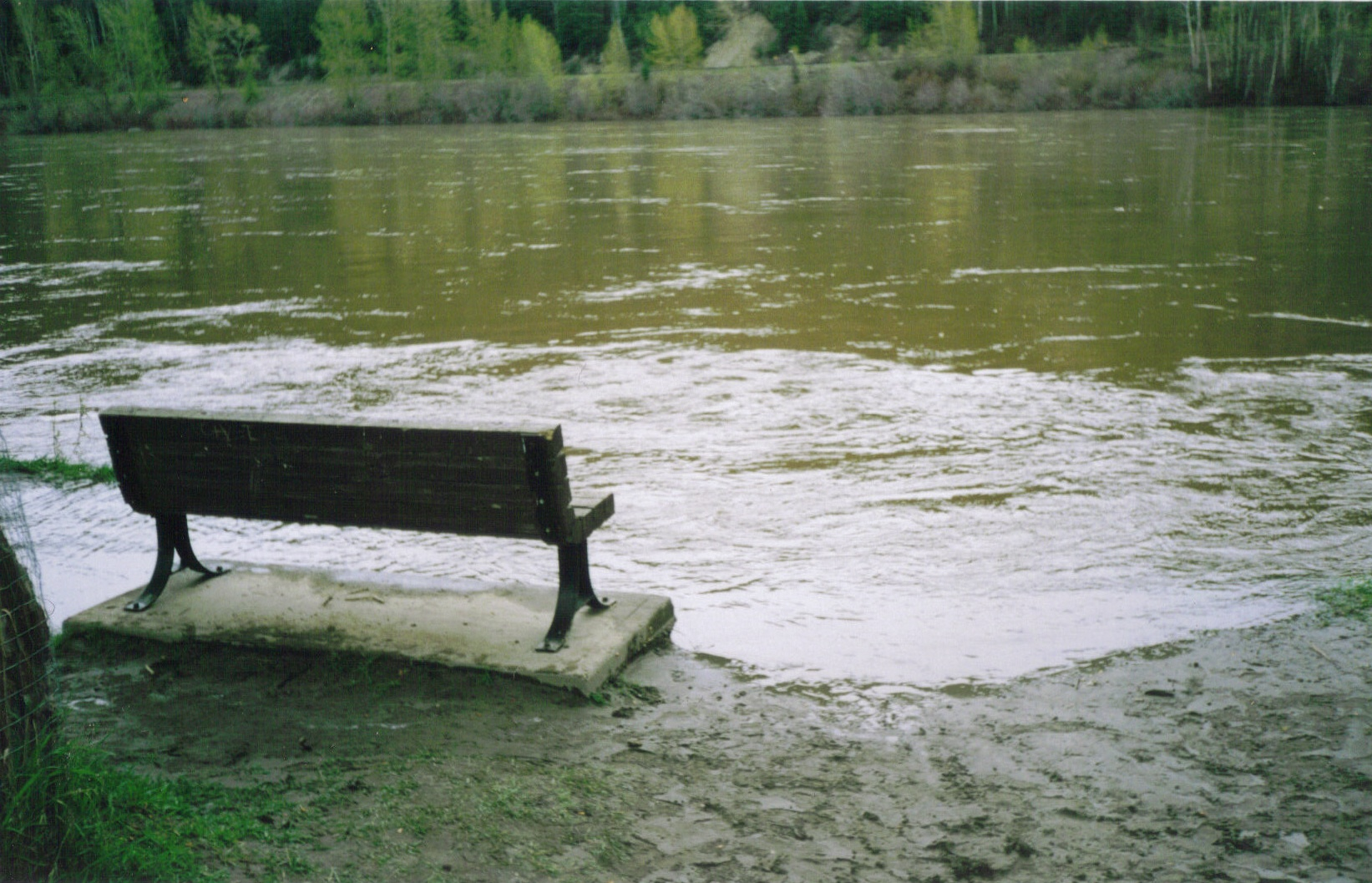
Flood conditions at Paddlewheel Park May 2007

The park has a seating area and plaque that explains its history, but due to its location in a low-lying area by the Fraser River, it has been prone to flooding, especially during spring run-off.
