= Nechacco =

Sternwheeler

Coordinates: 53.1315°N 122.6690°W

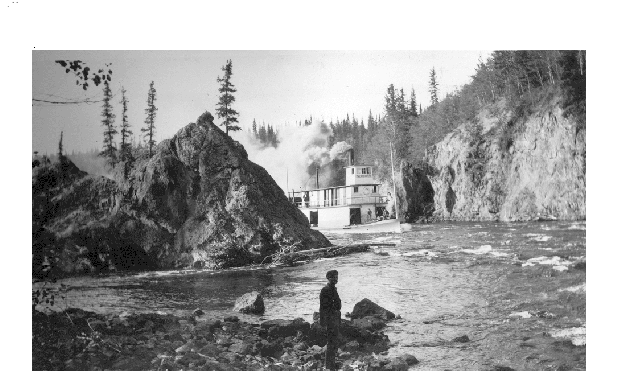
- Nechacco on the Nechako River 1909

History

Canada
- Name: Nechacco
- Builder: Donald McPhee
- Laid down: 1909
- Launched: May 25, 1909 at Quesnel, British Columbia
- In service: 1909-1911
- Renamed: re-registered as Chilco 1910
- Fate: Tore apart in ice jam at the Cottonwood Canyon, April 1911

General characteristics
- Length: 80 ft (24.4 m)
- Beam: 16.4 ft (5.0 m)
- Notes: No. 126512

The Nechacco sternwheeler was built for service on the Soda Creek to Fort George route on the upper Fraser River in British Columbia. She was owned by the Fort George Lumber and Navigation Company. The partners in this company were Nick Clark and Russel Peden of South Fort George, who operated a sawmill there. Nick Clark also owned the lots in that townsite and was offering them up for sale. The new steamer was intended to bring prospective property buyers to Fort George and to furnish them with supplies.

== 1909 ==
The Nechacco was built by Donald McPhee and was launched in Quesnel on May 25, 1909. In her first year of service she was piloted by Captain John Bonser, an experienced swift-water pilot from the Skeena and Yukon Rivers. Under his direction, the Nechacco completed several difficult and history making trips. She was the first sternwheeler to reach Fort George from Quesnel, arriving on May 30, barely nudging the Charlotte out of the honor, and the first to ever navigate through the fearsome Grand Canyon of the Fraser, 104 miles upriver from Fort George. She was also the only sternwheeler to follow in the footsteps of the pioneer ship Enterprise and make the trip to Takla Landing on Takla Lake, as well as the first steamer to take the Nechako River all the way to Stoney Creek. The Nechacco was often chartered by pioneer surveyor Frank Swannell whose survey work took him far and wide along many of the local rivers from 1908 until 1914.

Despite such a prestigious start, she was destined to have the most dramatic end of all the upper Fraser sternwheelers.

== 1910 ==
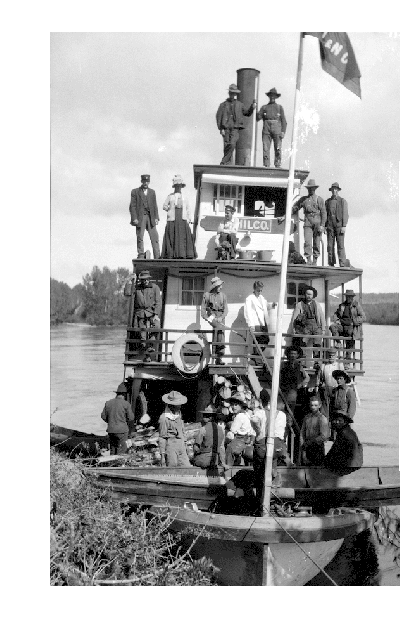
Chilco (1910) John and Ida Bonser at upper left

In 1910, the Nechacco had been re-registered as the Chilco and was piloted for the first part of the season by Captain Bonser and the latter part by Captain George Ritchie. Late in November, she was on her way back from Soda Creek with South Fort George's winter food supplies and had just passed the Cottonwood Canyon when she hit a reef and sank. The river was nearing freeze up and nothing could be done at that time to salvage her, so the cargo was removed and taken down to Quesnel. Upon hearing of the wreck, one of the Chilco's owners, Russell Peden, and South Fort George hotelier, Al Johnson, immediately snow-shoed down to Quesnel to petition Captain Browne, who was then master of the BX, to make one last trip upriver with the much needed supplies. Browne consented and the supplies were delivered without incident, although ice had already begun to form along the shoreline.

== 1911 ==
In March 1911, Captain Ritchie returned to the Chilco with his crew and began the salvage operations and temporary repairs that were necessary to get her back to Quesnel where she could be properly made ready for the season. In late April, Ritchie decided that the river was clear and started the trip downstream to Quesnel. Upon entering the head of the Cottonwood Canyon, he saw that the foot of the canyon was blocked solid with ice. The Chilco was rapidly speeding towards the deadly obstacle and it was too late to turn back. The captain and the crew escaped to the shore on the lifeboat and there were no injuries or loss of life. (Other reports were made in the local paper, then the Fort George Herald, that the escape was made onto the ice). Nonetheless, the result was the same, the crew survived, but the Chilco did not. She was torn apart in the icy waters and not one piece of her was ever recovered.

== See also ==
- Steamboats of the Upper Fraser River in British Columbia
- List of ships in British Columbia
- Giscome Portage
