= Big Kettle Fumarole =

- Interactive map of Big Kettle Fumarole
- Location: British Columbia, Canada
- Coordinates: 56°12′30″N 126°37′10″W
- Elevation: 1,088 m (3,570 ft)

The Big Kettle Fumarole is a low temperature gas vent at the junction of Humar Creek and Omineca River in Cassiar Land District of northern British Columbia, Canada. It contains a 4.6 m (15 ft) high and 1.8 m (5.9 ft) diameter tufa cone with a 1.5 m (4.9 ft) deep kettle-like depression. This cone represents the remains of a former cold spring.

The Big Kettle outgasses carbon dioxide from its kettle-like depression. British Columbia Land Surveyors (BCLS) member Frank Swannell visited the fumarole in 1913 and noted that several dead birds and small animals were present. Swannell speculated that they were killed by an intermittent issue of sulfurous gas.
