= Gustavus Blin Wright =

Canadian entrepreneur (1830–1898)

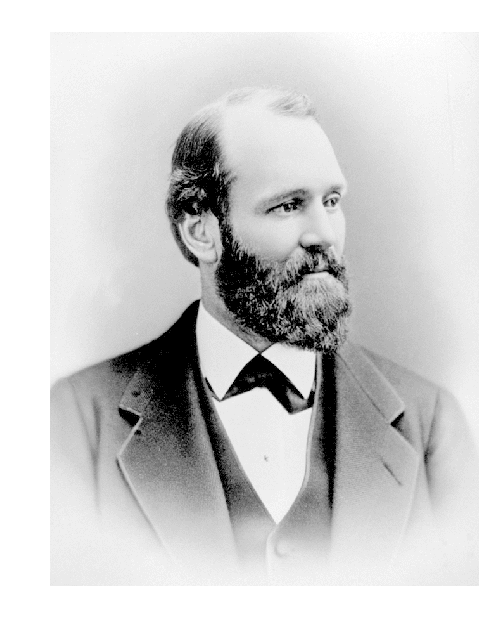
Gustavus Blin Wright 1870

Gustavus Blin Wright (June 22, 1830 – April 8, 1898) was a pioneer roadbuilder and entrepreneur in British Columbia, Canada. His biggest achievement was building the Old Cariboo Road to the Cariboo gold fields, from Lillooet to Fort Alexandria, but he was also a partner in a freighting firm that operated on the Douglas Road, he ran a toll bridge at Bridge River, near Lillooet, and built part of the road from Quesnel to Barkerville. He was also the original owner of the town of 70 Mile House.

== Early years ==
Gustavus Blinn Wright was born in Burlington, Vermont, United States. He arrived in British Columbia on February 28, 1862, aboard the steamer Brother Jonathan and began a partnership that operated vessels on the route between San Francisco and New Westminster.

== The Old Cariboo Road ==
On August 16, 1862, Wright won the contract to build the 47 mile (76 km) long section of the Old Cariboo Road from Lillooet to Cut-Off Valley, which connects from the Fraser River at Pavilion, over Pavilion Mountain via Kelly Lake to Clinton, British Columbia, as "47 Mile House" would become known. He was also given the option to complete the rest of the 151 miles (243 km) of construction to Alexandria, which he also undertook. By the end of the 1862 season, his crews had completed the road as far as the 127 Mile post. He built a camp for his workers for the winter of at 70 Mile House and then purchased the property outright the following spring.

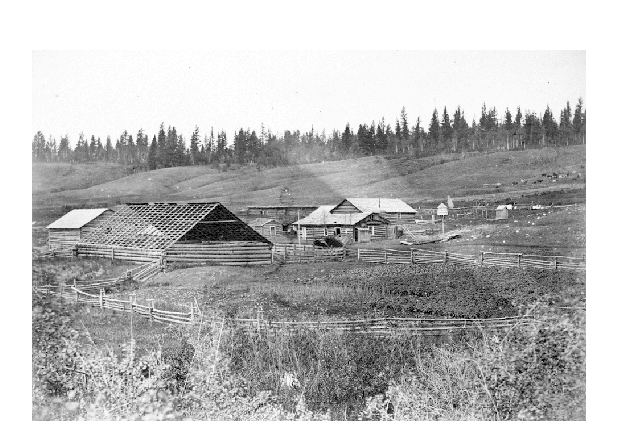
Wright's Ranch at 127 Mile House 1867

Some controversy erupted when Wright proposed a change to the planned route that had originally been intended to go past the roadhouse at Williams Lake. Wright said he was concerned that the high cliffs and deep ravines would make construction too difficult and he proposed a different route that by-passed Williams Lake and went past Wright's own roadhouse at Deep Creek instead. While some believed Wright was making a perfectly logical decision based on the difficulty of the terrain, others, like the owners of the roadhouse at Williams Lake, claimed that Wright had ulterior motives, and was changing the route simply for the sake of the profits he stood to gain by diverting the majority of the traffic to his own roadhouse. The situation was finally resolved by Colonel Moody of the Royal Engineers, who examined both routes and came back with the recommendation that the road be built as Wright had proposed.

By July 1863, the section was completed through to Soda Creek and Alexandria. Then, early in 1864, Wright undertook the construction of the wagon road from Quesnel 26 miles (42 km) to Cottonwood, on the way to Barkerville.

== Wright's sternwheelers ==
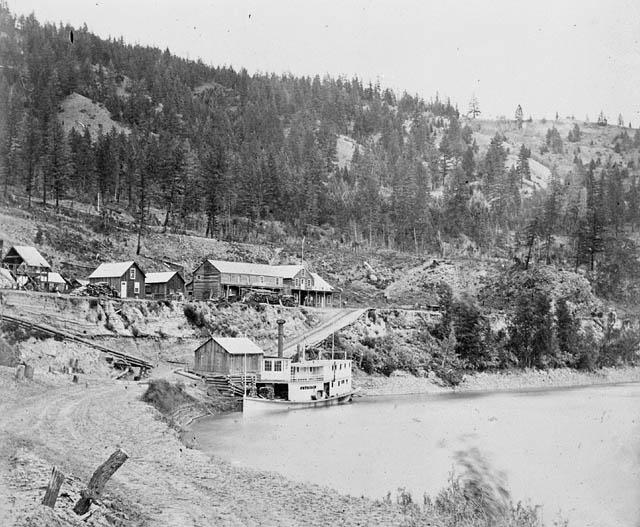
Wright's Enterprise at Soda Creek 1868

At Alexandria, Wright built the first of his two sternwheelers that would ferry passengers and supplies up the Fraser River to Quesnel. It was the Enterprise, and was built by Victoria shipbuilder, James Trahey. The Enterprise was launched and put into service in the spring of 1863.

In 1868 Wright built a second sternwheeler to augment the service of the Enterprise. It was the Victoria built at Quesnel by James Trahey and put into service in the spring of 1869.

== The Omineca Gold Rush ==
In 1871, during the Omineca Gold Rush, Wright decided to take the Enterprise up to Takla Landing, 230 miles (370 km) northwest of Quesnel, following a route that even the seasoned Hudson's Bay Company canoe-men regarded as extremely difficult. In June 1871, the Enterprise left Quesnel with a full load of passengers and freight, and, after a perilous trip that took more than two months, arrived at Takla Lake on August 12. However, by then other supply routes had been made to the Omineca diggings, from Hazelton via the Skeena River. On her journey back from Takla, the Enterprise was wrecked and abandoned on Trembleur Lake. Wright's Victoria would work on the upper Fraser River until 1886, when she was berthed at Steamboat Landing near Alexandria.

He died on April 8, 1898, in Ainsworth, BC.
