= Enterprise (1863) =

Mid-19th Century British Columbian Sternwheeler

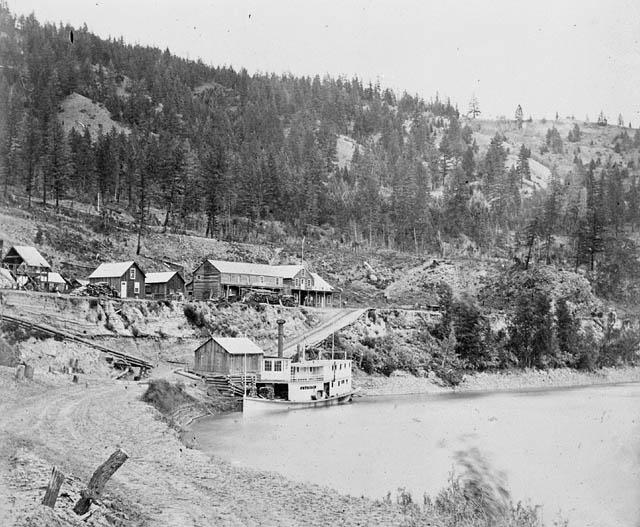
- Enterprise at Soda Creek in 1868

History

Colony of British Columbia
- Name: Enterprise
- Builder: James Trahey
- Laid down: 1862
- Launched: May 9, 1863
- In service: 1863-1871
- Fate: Abandoned on Trembleur Lake

General characteristics
- Length: 110 ft (33.5 m)
- Beam: 20 ft (6.1 m)
- Propulsion: 15 ft 6 in (4.72 m) sternwheel
- Speed: 12 knots
- Notes: Captain JW Doane

The Enterprise was a passenger and freight sternwheeler that was built for service on the Soda Creek to Quesnel route on the upper Fraser River in British Columbia. It was built at Four Mile Creek near Alexandria by pioneer shipbuilder James Trahey of Victoria for Gustavus Blin Wright and Captain Thomas Wright and was put into service in the spring of 1863. Her captain was JW Doane. The Enterprise was the first of twelve sternwheelers that would work on this section of the Fraser from 1863 to 1921. Though she was not large, she was a wonderful example of the early craft of shipbuilding. All of the lumber she was built from was cut by hand and her boiler and engines had been brought to the building site at Four Mile packed by mule via the wagon road from Port Douglas, 300 miles away.

== The route ==
The Fraser River was not considered navigable by sternwheeler between Yale and Soda Creek due to many hazardous canyons and rapids, so the terminus of river navigation on the upper Fraser River was located at Soda Creek. From there a steamer could travel with no obstructions to Quesnel where a stage road ran to Barkerville. The stages of Barnard's Express would travel on the Cariboo Road up from Yale and connect with the Enterprise at Soda Creek. Passengers and freight would then be transferred onto the sternwheeler and travel upriver 56 miles to Quesnel. Once there they would be transferred to company stages again to Barkerville for the last 54 miles. The Enterprise made this trip three times a week, from May to October, for eight years. In October 1863 she carried two Englishmen, Viscount Milton and Dr. Walter Butler Cheadle who would later write fondly of the experience, "Given use of captain's cabin, cigars and books. Fetched out every few minutes to have a drink with someone... Cocktails every five minutes and champagne lunch afterward.".

Not all early sternwheeler passengers would be so delighted with the experience. Most would be expected to sleep on the open deck and had to work for, as well as pay for, their passage. Usually this work involved 'wooding up': cutting and loading firewood for the boiler which could consume as much as five cords an hour. .

== The Omineca Gold Rush ==
In 1871 during the Omineca Gold Rush, the Wrights decided to take the Enterprise up to Takla Landing, 230 miles northwest of Quesnel, following a route that even the seasoned Hudson's Bay Company canoe-men regarded as extremely difficult. In June 1871, the Enterprise left Quesnel with a full load of passengers including a reporter from Barkerville's Cariboo Sentinel. She navigated the Fort George Canyon on July 6, although the help of the passengers was required as they cranked her manual capstan to line through. She arrived in Fort George, then a large First Nations village and a Hudson's Bay Company Post, and continued onto the Nechako River, up to the Stuart River and through Stuart Lake onto Tachie River to Trembleur Lake to Middle River, finally arriving at Takla Lake on August 12. It would be a journey worthy of its own chapter of sternwheeler history and a fitting swan song for the pioneer steamer because, although it was an amazing accomplishment, it was made too late. Other supply routes had been made to the Omineca diggings, from Hazelton via the Skeena River. On her journey back from Takla, the Enterprise was wrecked and abandoned on Trembleur Lake.

== See also ==
- Steamboats of the Upper Fraser River in British Columbia
- List of ships in British Columbia
- Enterprise (1855)

== References and further reading ==
- Downs, Art (1971). Paddlewheels on the Frontier Volume 1. Foremost Publishing. ISBN 0-88826-033-4.
- West, Willis (1985). Stagecoach and Sternwheel Days in the Cariboo and Central BC. Heritage House. ISBN 0-919214-68-1.
- West, Willis (1949). The BX and the Rush to Fort George. British Columbia Historical Quarterly.
