= Quesnel (sternwheeler) =

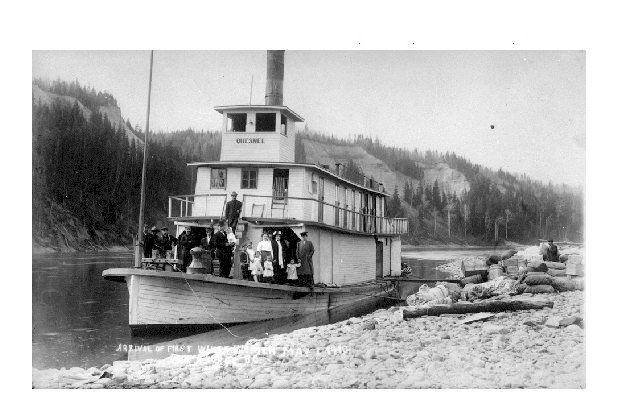
- Quesnel at South Fort George 1910

History

Canada
- Name: Quesnel
- Builder: John Strand and Donald McPhee
- Laid down: 1909
- Launched: May 1909 as City of Quesnel relaunched September 2, 1909 as Quesnel at Quesnel, British Columbia
- In service: 1909-1921
- Fate: Wrecked at Fort George Canyon in 1921
- Notes: Captain Donald Arthur Foster

General characteristics
- Length: 70 ft (21.3 m)
- Beam: 16.2 ft (4.9 m)
- Notes: No. 126245

Quesnel was a sternwheeler first launched in May 1909 at Quesnel, British Columbia to serve the Soda Creek to Fort George route of the upper Fraser River.

== Career ==
Originally named City of Quesnel, the vessel was largely constructed locally. City of Quesnel was owned by merchant Telesphore Marion, built by carpenter John Strand, and piloted by Captain Donald Arthur Foster, all locals of Quesnel. However, on her launch day, it was discovered that she rode too low in the water and that her hull needed to be lengthened. Shipbuilder Donald McPhee was already in town, having just completed the construction of another sternwheeler, the Nechacco. McPhee was hired to do the work and City of Quesnel was rebuilt and relaunched under the name Quesnel on September 2.

Among the first of the upper Fraser River vessels built during the era of rail construction, she would also be the last. She served the district for six seasons, until she was retired in the spring of 1915. By then, several factors had devastated the local economy and steamer service wasn't as profitable as it had been previously. The Grand Trunk Pacific Railway was completed, and the outbreak of the Great War had caused an abrupt halt to the construction of the promised Pacific Great Eastern Railway which had been under construction from Fort George south since early 1914.

== Sinking ==
In April 1921, Captain Foster, in partnership with WH Matheson, relaunched Quesnel, intending to resume the local service that BC Express and BX had recently abandoned. The local farmers, settlers and miners, especially those between Quesnel and Fort George, applauded her return, as it was a financial hardship for them to be without steamer service, because the rates on other shipping methods were higher.

Quesnel only worked for three weeks before she was wrecked in the Fort George Canyon on May 13. Captain Foster and Matheson recovered her cargo, which consisted of, among other things, a Ford automobile and 100 barrels of beer, and attempted to salvage her, but during the operation, she broke free from the rock she was caught on and sank and was never recovered. The era of river navigation on the upper Fraser was over.

== See also ==
- Steamboats of the Upper Fraser River in British Columbia
- List of ships in British Columbia

== References and further reading ==
- Downs, Art (1971). Paddlewheels on the Frontier Volume 1. Foremost Publishing. ISBN 0-88826-033-4.
- West, Willis (1985). Stagecoach and Sternwheel Days in the Cariboo and Central BC. Heritage House. ISBN 0-919214-68-1.
- West, Willis (1949). The BX and the Rush to Fort George. British Columbia Historical Quarterly.
