= BX (sternwheeler) =

Boat owned by Barnard's Express

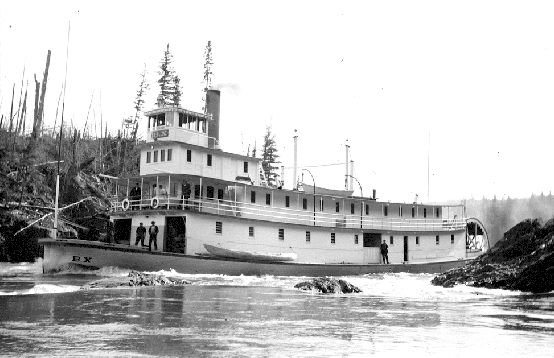
- BX in Fort George Canyon 1911

History

Canada
- Name: BX
- Builder: Alexander Watson Jr
- Laid down: 1910 in Soda Creek, British Columbia
- Launched: Friday May 13, 1910 at Soda Creek
- In service: 1910-1919
- Fate: Sank at Woodpecker 1919, salvaged and retired in 1920
- Notes: Captain Owen Forrester Browne

General characteristics
- Length: 127.5 feet (38.9 m)
- Beam: 28.8 feet (8.8 m)
- Draft: 16 inches empty 30 inches (760 mm) loaded
- Notes: No.126516

BX was a sternwheeler and the first of two river steamers built for service on the upper Fraser River by the BC Express Company during the busy era of Grand Trunk Pacific Railway construction. The BX was built at Soda Creek in early 1910 by Alexander Watson Jr, of Victoria, who was one of British Columbia's foremost shipbuilders and the son of the man who had built the sternwheeler Charlotte. The BC Express Company also hired Captain Owen Forrester Browne to be the master of the BX as he was the most experienced upper Fraser River pilot.

== Construction ==
Captain Browne worked with Alexander Watson throughout the design and construction phases of the BX. Watson purchased the BX's boiler, engines and other equipment from the Chicago Marine Ironworks Company, who were informed that the BX's construction site at Soda Creek was 167 miles (269 km) away from the railway at Ashcroft and therefore the equipment would have to be hauled by horse drawn freighters for that distance. Chicago Marine decided to build the boiler in sections, the heaviest piece was less than 10,000 lb (4,500 kg), so it was easily transported to the construction site. They also supplied two compound condensing engines for the BX which would use half the fuel of a single engine of similar power. These engines gave the BX an enormous advantage over the other sternwheelers that were on the river at this time, as it cut down on both the labor needed to load the wood and the cargo space required to carry it.It was later estimated that these engines saved the BX a sum equal to the amount of her construction, $54,531.33.

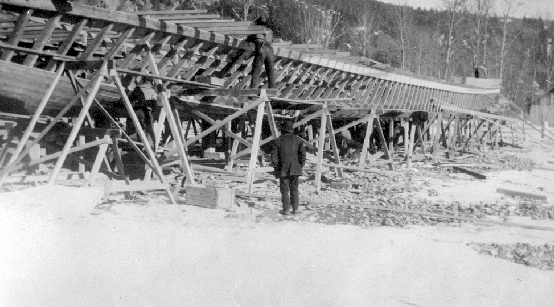
RMS BX under construction in 1910

For the hull, Watson turned to local man, William Lyne, who was a portable sawmill operator.Lyne was instructed to find a good stand of fir and cut the necessary timbers and planks. Intending to build a steamer with the lightest draught possible, Watson built the rest of the BX out of first grade cedar, shipped up from Victoria. Construction began in February when Watson arrived with a crew of fifty carpenters, joiners and labourers and work was begun on the hull.

At the end of March, a near catastrophe occurred. The ice on the Fraser suddenly broke up and piled up at Soda Creek Canyon, a quarter mile from the BX's construction site. The river overflowed its banks and chunks of ice were deposited all over the site. The rushing water knocked the BX off its blocks and swept many of the tools and supplies out of the warehouse and down into the river. Luckily the workers had heard the ice breaking up in the canyon and had been able to scramble to higher ground and safety. When the floodwaters receded, Watson was able to inspect the BX and found that the only damage done was some twisted and broken timbers that were quickly replaced. The company swiftly shipped up the replacement tools and supplies from Ashcroft and work resumed once more.

When the BX was completed, she had three decks, with stateroom accommodation for 70 passengers and could also carry another 60 deck passengers. The staterooms featured steam heat, hot and cold running water, fine quality bedding and attractive wall and floor coverings. Her dining room could seat 50 and was lavishly furnished, right down to the plates, which were specially ordered from England and monogrammed in the BX Company's colors: red, yellow and white. Off the ladies cabin above the covered paddlewheel a bridal chamber was built, which contained, among other luxuries, a double brass bed and a silk eiderdown worth $150. Many dignitaries, including Premier Richard McBride would travel in the comfort of this sumptuous suite.

== Maiden voyage ==
The BX was launched at Soda Creek on Friday May 13, 1910, without ceremony. Many people of a superstitious bent, especially the shipyard workers, criticized Watson and Browne for choosing to launch a ship on a Friday the 13th. The BC Express Company mollified the workers by explaining that it was the company's lucky day.

Watson and Browne were pleased with how the BX sat in the water, her draught was only 16 inches (410 mm) at the bow and 20 inches (510 mm) at her deepest part. Even fully loaded, with a hundred tons of freight, she only sat 30 inches into the water.

She left Soda Creek for her first trip upstream on May 23, leaving at the break of day and arriving in Quesnel at 11 am. Captain Browne made semi-weekly trips between Quesnel and Soda Creek until June 23 when he decided that the BX was ready for testing in the two canyons between Quesnel and Fort George, the Cottonwood Canyon and the Fort George Canyon. He left Quesnel at 1pm and upon arriving at the Cottonwood Canyon, offloaded the passengers and lined through using the steam capstan. However, Browne soon realized that the light and powerful BX did not need to line through and could run the canyons unaided. By law passengers were forced to disembark and walk around any canyon that a steamer was lining through and be picked up on the other side. However, by the fall of 1910, the federal steamboat inspector decided that the BX was allowed to keep her passengers on board. This gave her a huge advantage over her rivals, all of which had to line through both canyons, wasting time and fuel as well as inconveniencing the passengers.

The BX arrived in South Fort George on June 24, to a warm welcome from the local populace. The steamer landing on the Fraser had been there since 1909 and was already used by the vessels Charlotte, Chilco and Quesnel. Nevertheless, local residents had been anticipating the day of the BX's arrival to see where the company would choose to have its landing and where it would build its office and warehouse. Many local business decisions were going to be based on this, as it was widely and correctly assumed that the BX would be bringing up the bulk of the passengers and landseekers from the south. One businessman, hotelier Al Johnson, was waiting for this information so he would know where to build Fort George's first licensed hotel, the Hotel Northern. The promoters of South Fort George were well aware of the huge benefit it would be to have the landing at their town-site, so the day after the BX arrived they offered the BC Express Company free lots of their choice in South Fort George. The company accepted the offer and construction on the facilities was begun. This would be a huge disappointment to South Fort George's rival town-site, Central Fort George on the Nechako River, which had hoped for the BC Express's landing and offices for itself. George Hammond, the promoter for Central, made the best he could out of a bad situation and hired a representative for the Central town-site and had him travel on the BX and promote Central to the passengers before they arrived in South Fort George.

== The route ==
Once the BX had been successfully tested in the canyons, she began a semi-weekly passenger and mail service from Soda Creek to Fort George. The BX would meet the company horse stages or automobiles at Soda Creek and would leave at 3am on Sundays and Wednesdays, arriving in Quesnel at noon, offload cargo and passengers and continue upriver until dark. The next day she would start again at dawn and arrive in Fort George around 11am. The return trips downriver were much faster, the BX would leave Fort George on Tuesdays and Saturdays at 7am and arrive in Soda Creek at 4pm the same day. She made good speed through the canyons, often as fast as 30 mph (48 km/h).

In 1910, the stage fare from Ashcroft to Soda Creek was $27.50, steamer fare from there to Fort George was $17.50, meals were 75 cents and berths, $1.50. Along the route, if a settler needed the BX to stop, they simply raised a white flag along the riverbank and the steamer would pull over and land. A white flag was never ignored, it might only be a settler wanting to ship some produce to market, or it could be a sick child that needed emergency transportation to a hospital.

Late in 1910, the BX fulfilled a heroic role. The Chilco had been on its way up from Quesnel to Fort George in late November with Fort George's winter food supply when it met with an accident just above the Cottonwood Canyon and the food had to be transported back to Quesnel. When news of this reached Fort George, pioneers Al Johnson and Russell Peden snow-shoed down to Quesnel to petition Captain Browne to make one last run with the BX with the necessary supplies. By then ice had begun to form along the river, but Captain Browne consented and brought the BX to Fort George, without as much as a scratch on her paint.

1911 was a busy year as more settlers poured into the district, and in 1912, the BX was joined by her sister ship, the BC Express, which under the command of Captain Joseph Bucey, had been built for service on the Fort George to Tête Jaune Cache section of the upper Fraser. However, that year the Fraser was very low and all the sternwheelers had trouble. The BX rammed the same rock twice in the Fort George Canyon, until her crew, in case of frustrated over-exuberance, dynamited the offending boulder, thereby breaking every window in the BX in the process.

But 1912 also brought some very good news for all the local river steamers, and the area in general. It was announced that another railway was going to be built, the Pacific Great Eastern which would run from Vancouver to Fort George and eventually beyond to the Peace River Country. Foley, Welch and Stewart would be the contractors for this railway as well and they planned to build the grade along the upper Fraser River from Fort George to Soda Creek so that sternwheelers could be used to aid in its construction.

In 1914, the construction of the Grand Trunk Pacific was finished and construction on the Pacific Great Eastern began and the Foley, Welch and Stewart vessels, the Operator and the Conveyor joined BX and BC Express on the route between Soda Creek and Fort George. By then, the rivalry between the FW&S boats and the BC Express boats was quite heated and it soon came down to a race. The Conveyor had proved itself to be swifter than its sister ship Operator, as had the BX proven swifter than the BC Express, so one day in July, the Conveyor's Captain Shannon challenged Captain Browne to a race to Quesnel from Soda Creek. The rules were rather odd, as the BX was still obligated to stop and deliver her mail at several different landings whereas the Conveyor had no such obligation and could run right through. As the race progressed, it soon became obvious to all that the BX was the faster boat, as she had stayed ahead for most of the race, despite having to stop several times. At one landing the BX had more mail to deliver than usual and had fallen behind the Conveyor, but she soon caught up and was passing her opponent when Captain Johnson rammed the BX with the Conveyor. Captain Browne immediately pulled over to inspect his boat for damages and the Conveyor pulled ahead again. Fortunately Browne soon discovered that the Conveyor had hit the BX just where the shear of her guards met and that there was no serious damage. In fact, when Browne arrived in Quesnel, he had almost caught up with the Conveyor again. When the full tale was heard by the local populace, it was unanimously agreed that the BX was the winner and she was declared the "Speed Queen of the Fraser". Captain Shannon, meanwhile was apologetic, and had stated that he just got caught up in the moment.

That would be the last race on the upper Fraser River, because that August would bring the onset of World War I and the halting of construction of the Pacific Great Eastern.

== The end of an era ==
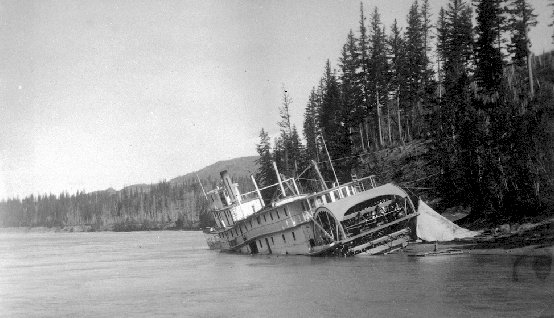
BX sunk at Woodpecker 1919

In 1915, only the BX was used on the upper Fraser River, with the BC Express reserved for special trips. Despite having a monopoly on river traffic, the BX finished the season with a $7000 loss.

In 1916 and 1917, sternwheelers were not used on the river at all. In 1918, after an appeal from the Quesnel Board of Trade, the provincial government granted the BC Express Company a $10,000 per year subsidy to continue river navigation from Soda Creek to Fort George. The BX ran until August 30, 1919, when she was punctured by an infamous rock called the "Woodpecker" and sank with a 100 tons of bagged cement intended for construction of the Deep Creek Bridge. The BC Express Company, fully intending to salvage their prized craft, hired Alexander Watson Jr to rush up from Victoria to overhaul the BC Express, which had been out of service since 1915, so she could go rescue the BX. However, out at the site of the accident, it was discovered that the bags of cement had solidified and had to be separated before the BX could be raised and the salvage could not be completed before freeze-up. In early 1920, the salvage work was completed and at a cost of $40,000 the BX was raised and patched sufficiently to get her back to Fort George. The newly overhauled BC Express pushed her back upstream through the Fort George Canyon and to the shipyard at Fort George. This would be the first time in the history of sternwheelers that one would push another upriver through a canyon. That it could be accomplished was a fitting testament to the craftsmanship of Alexander Watson Jr and the skill of Captain Browne and Captain Bucey. The BC Express ran until November 1920 and then it joined the BX on the riverbank at Fort George, where their hulls were abandoned. Their engines and equipment were shipped to Northern Alberta to work on the Mackenzie River for the Alberta and Arctic Transportation Company.

== See also ==
- Steamboats of the Upper Fraser River in British Columbia
- List of ships in British Columbia

== References and further reading ==
- Downs, Art (1971). Paddlewheels on the Frontier Volume 1. Foremost Publishing. ISBN 0-88826-033-4.
- West, Willis (1985). Stagecoach and Sternwheel Days in the Cariboo and Central BC. Heritage House. ISBN 0-919214-68-1.
- West, Willis (1949). The BX and the Rush to Fort George. British Columbia Historical Quarterly.
- Christensen, Bev (1989). Prince George: Rivers, Railways and Timber. Windsor Publications. ISBN 0-89781-266-2.
- Leonard, Frank (1996). A Thousand Blunders: The History of the Grand Trunk Pacific Railway in Northern British Columbia. UBC Press. ISBN 0-7748-0552-8.
- Koppel, Tom (1995). Kanaka:The Untold Story of Hawaiian Pioneers in British Columbia and the Pacific Northwest. Whitecap Books. ISBN 1-55110-295-1.
- Runnalls, Reverend Francis Edwin (1946). A History of Prince George. Prince George: the author.
