= South Fort George =

Suburb in canada

Coordinates: 53.8958°N 122.7416°W

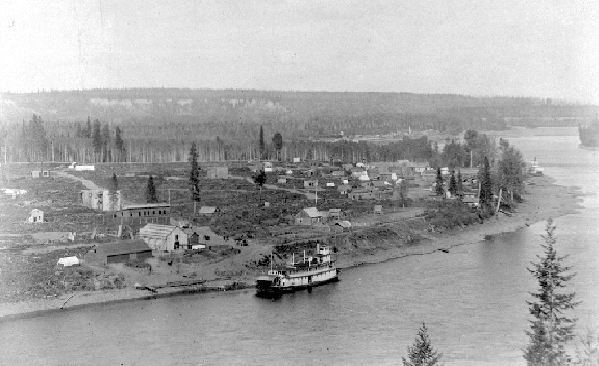
BX at South Fort George (1910)

South Fort George is a suburb of Prince George, British Columbia, Canada.

Before the arrival of the Grand Trunk Pacific Railway in 1914, the Prince George area was known as Fort George and was a Lheidli T'enneh village and Hudson's Bay Company store.

In 1909, two rival townsites were built and promoted. One was on the Fraser River and was called South Fort George, while the other was on the Nechako River and was called Central Fort George. Both of these townsites believed that the railway would build a station in their community, but in May 1912, the railway chose to purchase the First Nation's village instead.

== History ==
=== Early pioneers ===
In 1909, Nick Clark of the Northern Development Company purchased the South Fort George property from Alexander Hamilton and Joseph Thapage. Then the company subdivided the land into town lots which would be put up for sale in 1910. Meanwhile, Nick Clark built a sawmill and, with Russell Peden and William Cooke, started the Fort George Lumber and Navigation Company and arranged for the building of a sternwheeler for the community, the Nechacco. The new steamer was intended to bring prospective property buyers to South Fort George and to furnish them with supplies. The Nechacco would be the first sternwheeler to reach South Fort George from Quesnel, arriving on May 30, 1909, barely nudging the Charlotte out of the honor.

Once the community had sternwheeler service, other businesses began to arrive, such as the Bank of British North America, established in 1910, and three general stores.

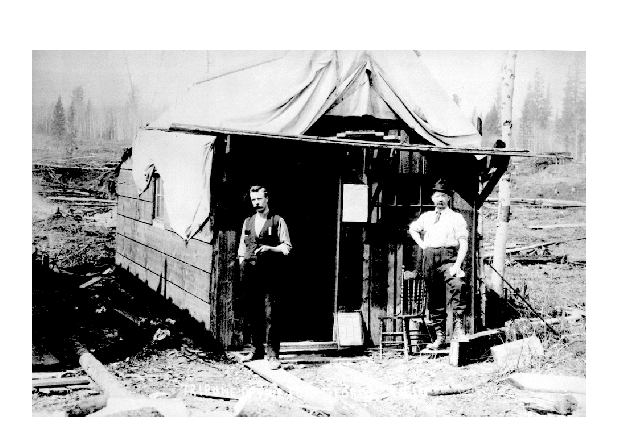
John Houston (on left) outside the Fort George Tribune

Pioneer newspaperman John Houston arrived in South Fort George in the fall of 1909 and began the Fort George Tribune. The first edition was published on November 6, 1909. Unfortunately, other than land claims notices there was little local news for his paper to report. John's articles were often humorous and included notices as to whose cow recently had a calf and what he'd had to pay for eggs that week. He commented in one article about how his socks often froze to the floor while he sat at his printing press and worked on the newspaper.

=== The Hotel Northern ===
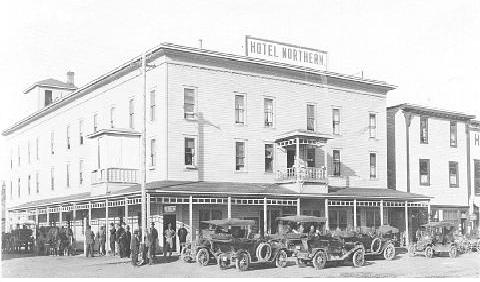
Hotel Northern (1913)

Hoteliers Al Johnson and Robert Burns arrived in 1910, but wisely waited until the BC Express Company chose South Fort George as the location for their office and steamer landing. Once Johnson and Burns learned that the newly built and luxurious BX would be landing at South Fort George, they built the Hotel Northern and applied for and received a liquor license by December 1910. Unfortunately the first Hotel Northern wouldn't operate for very long and would burn down on July 1, 1911. However, Al Johnson wasted no time in replacing it and built the second Hotel Northern on Hamilton Avenue, on the corner of 3rd Street.

At the height of rail construction, particularly throughout 1913, the Northern was one of the busiest bars in British Columbia, employing 12 - 15 bartenders who worked along a 120-foot-long (37 m) bar. During this period, the Northern often sold $7,000 worth of 25 cent drinks in a single day.

=== The ladies of the evening ===
The Hotel Northern wasn't the only business making a fortune from railway construction. At least four brothels were built in South Fort George during this era and one Madam, Irene Jordan, did so well that she decided to expand her business into Central Fort George and built a large house there, the first two-piano brothel in Northern British Columbia. However, it turned out that Central Fort George did not want a brothel in their town and it was shut down by Police Chief Dunwoody. But the story would not end there. Undeterred, Miss Jordan had the new brothel skidded over to where the Prince George townsite was being built and the house was later rented by Prince George's first mayor, WG Gillette, to be the Prince George City Hall. Another public outcry erupted and the local newspaper editors had a grand time making jokes and drawing cartoons about this arrangement, until the mayor and the city council moved out into a new City Hall.

=== Theatres ===
Northern Interior Amusement Company opened the 500-seat-capacity Fort George Theatre in 1911 to operate every night except Sunday. Although screening silent movies, it primarily provided live entertainment in the form of boxing matches, and charity dinners, dances, and concerts, as well as providing a venue for political and religious meetings. The Maple Leaf Theatre, a smaller facility, existed at this time. Likely a vaudeville and movie house, it also hosted religious meetings. In 1913, the new proprietors, who upgraded the interior to cater for mainly movie screenings, renamed the venue as the Edison Electric Theatre. That same year, George H. Adams (formerly of the Edison), opened the small Dreamland Theatre. Also, relocating to the central business district of South Fort George, the Fort George Theatre was rebuilt with a balcony, boxes and sectional floor space. At year end, the Edison, Dreamland and Fort George Theatres existed. The Dreamland also staged charity concerts, before its relocation to George St, Prince George in January 1915.

=== The Great War ===
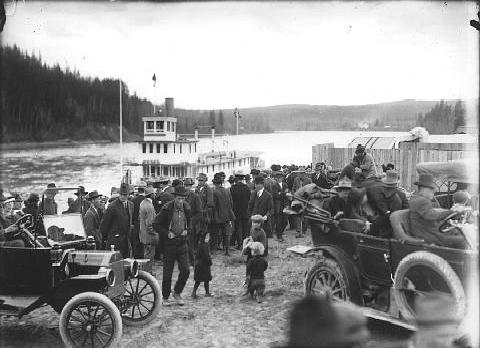
The sternwheeler landing at South Fort George (1913)

By 1913, South Fort George had a population of 1,500 residents, but by the fall of 1914, it was down to less than 1,000. Part of the reason for its decline was the construction of Prince George. Several of the South Fort George business had moved to better locations along George Street in the new town. Nevertheless, the main reason was the onset of the Great War, which caused many local men to enlist and travel overseas. The war also caused John Stewart of Foley, Welch and Stewart to put a halt to the local construction of the Pacific Great Eastern Railway, which devastated the local economy even further.

As the war continued, so did the decline in the population and the economy. In 1915, Al Johnson sold the Hotel Northern and moved down to Vancouver where he leased and operated the Castle Hotel until 1930.

The BX sternwheeler continued to work on the river, but finished the 1915 season with a $7000 loss. By 1916, all of the sternwheelers had been taken off the upper Fraser River until 1918 when the BX operated until she sank in the Fort George Canyon and had to be rescued by the BC Express. The Quesnel ran for a few short weeks in 1921, until she too was wrecked in the Fort George Canyon.

With the loss of so much of its population, Central Fort George was eventually abandoned and wouldn't be developed until 1953, but South Fort George persevered and became a village in 1968, remaining independent until 1976 when it was incorporated into the City of Prince George.

== South Fort George today ==
Today South Fort George is a residential area and home to many local businesses, including a few car dealerships.

The sternwheeler landing on Hamilton Avenue is commemorated by Paddlewheel Park.

== See also ==
- Steamboats of the Upper Fraser River in British Columbia
