= Soda Creek =

Soda Creek Xat'sull
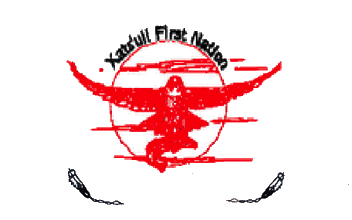
- Flag

- Location of Soda Creek in British Columbia
- Coordinates: 52°20′3.82″N 122°17′11.24″W
- Country: Canada
- Province: British Columbia
- Regional District: Cariboo
- Time zone: UTC−8 (PST)
  - Summer (DST): UTC−7 (PDT)

Soda Creek is a rural subdivision 38 km north of Williams Lake in British Columbia, Canada. Located on the east bank of the Fraser River, Soda Creek was originally the home of the Xat'sull First Nation. Soda Creek Indian Reserve No. 1 is located on the left (E) bank of the Fraser River, one mile south of the Soda Creek BCR (CN) station, 431.10 ha. 52°19′00″N 122°16′00″W

Xat'sull /ˈhætʃəl/ means "on the cliff where the bubbling water comes out".

European settlement began in the 1860s with the onset of the Cariboo Gold Rush and the building of the Old Cariboo Road.

== History ==
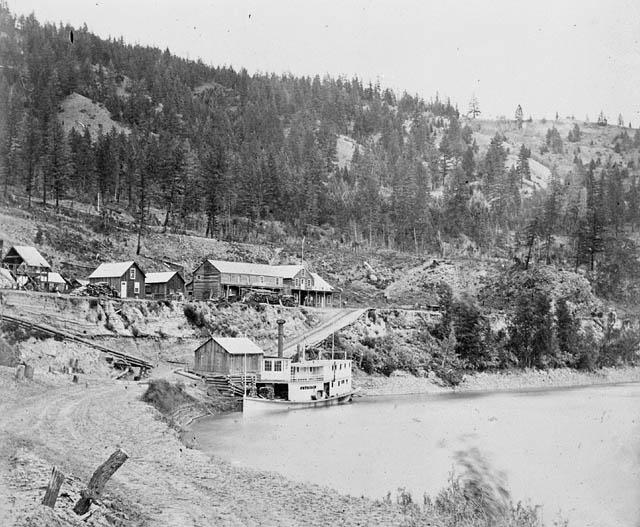
Enterprise at Soda Creek (1868)

The Old Cariboo Road was built from Lillooet to Alexandria, beginning in 1859 and completed to Soda Creek in 1863. The roadbuilder for that section was Gustavus Blin Wright.

While Wright was overseeing the construction of the road he was also arranging with his associates for the building of a sternwheeler steamer that could take travelers to Quesnellemouthe, (later shortened to Quesnel) where they could then travel east to Barkerville.

The Fraser River was not considered navigable by sternwheeler north of Yale due to many hazardous rapids and canyons. However, from Soda Creek to Quesnel, the Fraser was relatively free of obstructions, therefore Soda Creek was the logical terminus for sternwheelers on the upper Fraser River.

The Enterprise was launched in the spring of 1863 and most of the travelers on their way to the goldfields, by foot, horseback, or wagon, took the Enterprise as the wagon road would not be not completed to Quesnel until 1865.

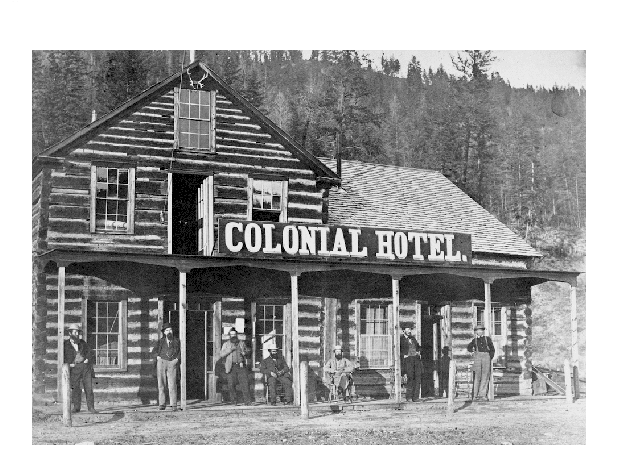
Colonial Hotel (1868)

With the launching of the Enterprise the government placed a land reserve on Soda Creek. Almost at once land lots were sold. Robert McLeese, Joseph T.Senay, Robert A. Collins, Peter Dunlevy, Henry Yeates, and George Hendricks, were some, who built hotels, stores, blacksmith shops and saloons on the site.

In 1869 Wright added a second sternwheeler to the route, the Victoria. Both sternwheelers worked on the route until 1871, when the Enterprise was taken up north to Takla Landing to deliver supplies and miners to the Omineca Gold Rush.

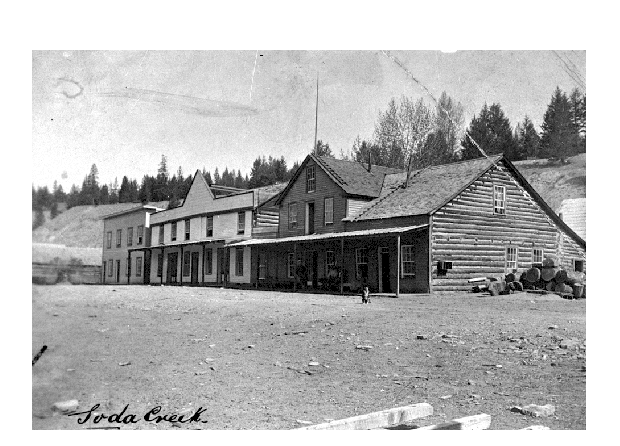
Main Street (1890s)

The Enterprise didn't return and the Victoria worked alone for the next 15 years until she was taken off the river in 1886. By then the gold rushes were over and Soda Creek slumbered until the construction of the Grand Trunk Pacific Railway.

== The second boom ==
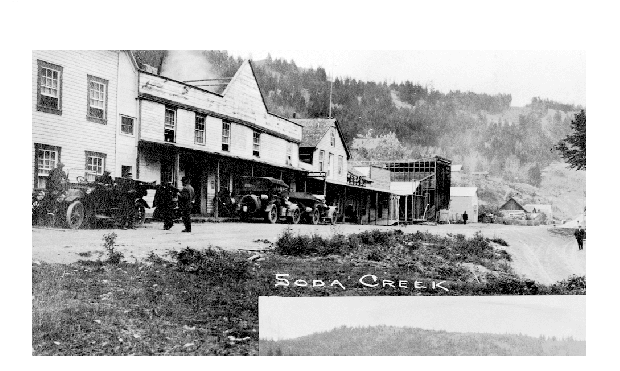
Soda Creek (1914)

Following the initial stampede to the Cariboo Gold Rush in the early 1860s, Soda Creek enjoyed a second boom which started in 1909, when it was announced that the Grand Trunk Pacific Railway's route would go through Fort George from eastern Canada.

Again the town's prosperity was due to being the natural sternwheeler terminus on the Fraser River as sternwheelers were necessary to take settlers and supplies safely and comfortably upriver to Fort George.

The Fort George Lumber and Navigation Company of South Fort George built two sternwheelers at Soda Creek, both in the winter of 1909/10, the Chilcotin and the Fort Fraser which were used along with the Chilco, Charlotte and Quesnel to deliver passengers and supplies to the new communities in Fort George.

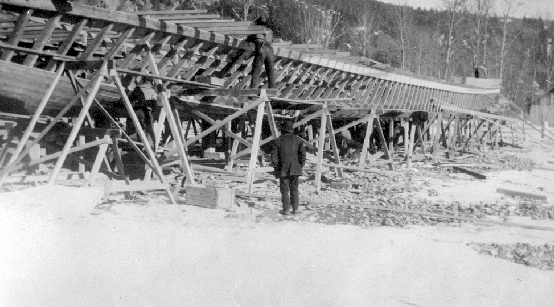
BX under construction (1910)

The BC Express Company had been servicing the area since the Cariboo Gold Rush and they held the government mail contract, so the company's owner, Charles Vance Millar, decided to expand the company's route to Fort George by adding sternwheelers and automobiles to their fleet of stagecoaches.

The BC Express Company built a company office and construction site at Soda Creek and in the winter of 1909/10 they built the BX and then the BC Express in the winter of 1911/12.

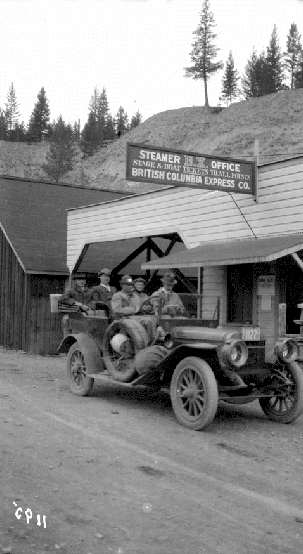
BX Office at Soda Creek (1911)

The automobiles were Winton Sixes, purchased in 1910 from a car manufacturer in Seattle.

During the years of rail construction, Soda Creek prospered as a major stopping place on the Cariboo Road as travelers and supplies came up from Ashcroft on stagecoaches or in automobiles and were transferred onto the sternwheelers to go further north.

== See also ==
- List of rivers of British Columbia
- Soda Creek/Deep Creek Band
