= Alexandria, British Columbia =

Hamlet in Cariboo Regional District, British Columbia, Canada

Alexandria
- Location of Alexandria in British Columbia
- Coordinates: 52°37′59″N 122°27′04″W
- Country: Canada
- Province: British Columbia
- Region: North Cariboo
- Regional district: Cariboo
- Time zone: UTC−07:00 (PT)
- Area codes: 250, 778, 236, & 672
- Highway: Highway 97

Alexandria or Fort Alexandria was a general area encompassing a trading post, ferry site, and steamboat landing in the North Cariboo region of central British Columbia. The present unincorporated community is on the eastern side of the Fraser River. On BC Highway 97, the locality is by road about 74 kilometres (46 mi) northwest of Williams Lake and 45 kilometres (28 mi) south of Quesnel.

== Name origin ==
The name honours Alexander Mackenzie, who in 1793 on his Peace River to Pacific Ocean expedition was the first European to visit the Alexandria First Nation village. On being warned of the dangerous falls and rapids downstream, Mackenzie returned northward beyond the future Quesnel, before turning westward along the West Road River (Blackwater River) toward the coast.

== First Nations ==
The First Nations village on the west side of the river was known as Tautin (Ltau'tenne, "sturgeon people"), part of the Takulli (Carrier), which originally numbered in the hundreds.

In 1826, when the Chilcotin attacked this village opposite the fort, the fur traders supplied arms to the vulnerable defenders. This gesture caused the former to stop trading with the fort for a period. Although the Carrier conducted some revenge killings that year, hostilities between the two groups had subsided by the following year.

Religious beliefs were often a mixture of traditional and Christianity. Around 1834, indigenous visitors from Oregon introduced one such belief, which the village members enthusiastically embraced. During this era, Father Demers used the fort as a base for his missionary endeavours.

By 1902, the effects of colonization had reduced the village to about 15 members.

== Fort ==
In 1821, George McDougall of the North West Company Chala-Oo-Chick trading post, west of Fort George, paddled downriver to establish the Alexandria trading post, prior to the corporate merger with the Hudson's Bay Company (HBC) that summer.

In HBC governance, Fort St. James was over Fort Alexandria, which was over the minor Fort Chilcotin. The fishery at the Alexandria post was significant both in terms of trade and the diet of residents.

In 1836, the fort relocated from the east side of the river to the west side, possibly to simplify trade with First Nations. Alternative accounts suggest the reasons as erosion of the riverbank, the fort burned to the ground, and/or accessing more arable land across the river for farming.

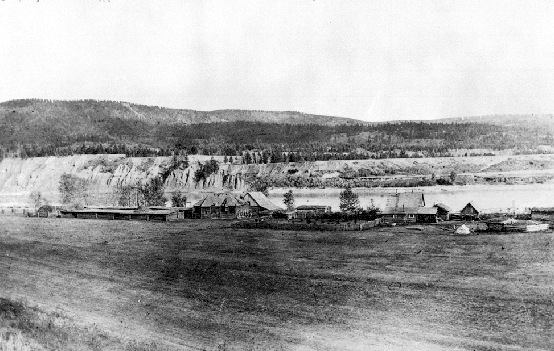
Fort Alexandria, 1910s

Tradition places the second fort adjacent to the existing church on the Alexandria reserve.

When news of the murder of Samuel Black, chief factor at Fort Kamloops, was received in 1841, one account indicates a party of four rode through the snow from Alexandria, whereas another states they delayed until mid-summer.

The fort emphasized growing crops and rearing cattle. The phenomenal wheat harvests prompted the construction of a flour mill. Using horses to rotate the grindstone, the mill operated 1842–1846.

The frame church built in 1846 was one of the four Roman Catholic (RC) missionary stations.

By 1860, the fort's workforce had reduced to four or five individuals, ten per cent of its peak number. The fort closed in 1867 and became purely a farm. HBC relinquished the property in 1881 and the buildings were demolished in 1915. The initial location was formally recognized as a National Historic Site of Canada in 1925. A commemorative cairn was erected in 1936 about 8 kilometres (5 mi) south of present Alexandria.

== Trails and roads ==
In the 1820s, the Hudson's Bay Brigade Trail from the fort went south to Fort Astoria (a.k.a. Fort George) at the Columbia River mouth. Furs from northern forts came by boat to Fort Alexandria, where pack trains carried the product south. A brigade could comprise 400 to 500 horses of which 200 were stabled at Fort Alexandria. In 1827, the route destination was changed to Fort Okanogan. The trail took eight days to cover about 320 kilometres (200 mi) to Fort Kamloops and 10 days to cover the remaining 480 kilometres (300 mi). The next year, the navigability of the Fraser was examined as an alternative route, but the 27 strong rapids in the passage south to the Bridge River mouth quashed the idea.

In 1843, a new brigade route south to Kamloops reduced the journey to 744 kilometres (462 mi). Before the signing of the Oregon Treaty in 1846, Alexander Caulfield Anderson, the chief factor at Alexandria, was surveying alternative routes before one was finalised in 1849.

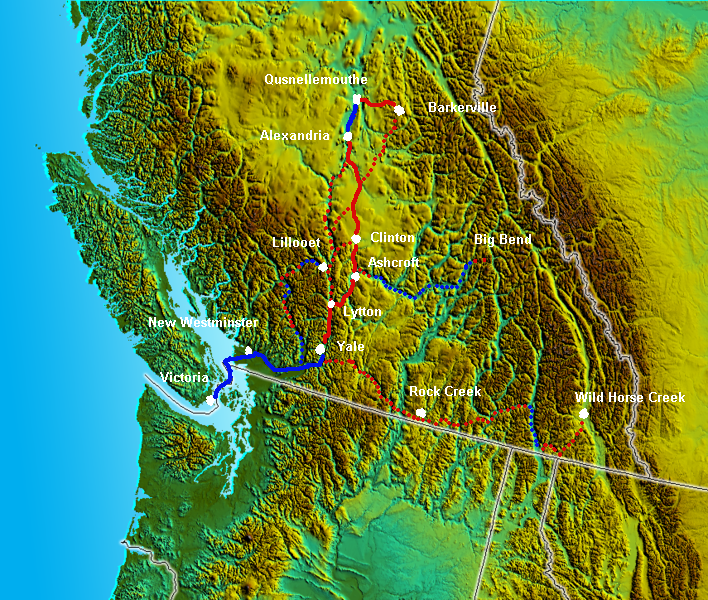
Route of the Cariboo Road in red. Steamboat travel in blue; dotted lines are alternate routes or routes to other goldfields

In 1860, the Pony Express Co began a Lytton–Fort Alexandria–Quesnel River route, which was a seven-day return trip.

In 1863, the completion of the Old Cariboo Road from Lillooet replaced the brigade trail to Kamloops. That year, Alfred Waddington's road crew began building a wagon road from Bentinck Arm to the fort. When the Chilcotin massacred the road workers in 1864, in what became known as the Chilcotin War, a 50-person force from the fort was part of an exercise to track down those responsible.

In 1863, James Trahey completed building the Enterprise at Cuisson Creek (Four Mile Creek) (south of present Alexandria, but north of the fort), and the steamer travelled between Soda Creek and Quesnel until its berthing in 1886 at Steamboat Landing near the fort. During that era, paddlewheelers called at the fort. While the ferry was withdrawn during the winter months, the early Lillooet–Soda Creek passenger stage was extended to Alexandria.

In 1864, the completion of the Cariboo Road superseded the road from Lillooet. That year, Walter Moberly built a wagon road northeastward to Richfield (immediately south of Barkerville).

At least during the 1940s, a Greyhound stop existed at Marguerite and briefly at Alexandria.

In 1954, 5.3 kilometres (3.3 mi) were paved southward from Alexandria. The next year, when surface runoff from torrential rains damaged the centre pier of the Cuisson Creek bridge, highway traffic was rerouted for a week over the railway bridge.

In spring 1960, the highway, which ran in front of the RC church, was realigned eastward to its present location following a landslide.

== Ferries ==
=== Early fort site ===
The ferry, which operated 1821–1895 was likely a rowboat, because a passing steamer was needed to take packhorses across and livestock swam.

=== Later Alexandria ===
About 0.8 kilometres (0.5 mi) north of Diamond Island, the pontoon reaction ferry was established in 1913 as a subsidised government service.

In 1940–41, a 10-ton standard reaction ferry replaced the 8-ton one. In 1942–43, the towers were renewed. In 1950, the ferry was discontinued.

=== Later Marguerite ===
About 4 kilometres (2.5 mi) south of the former fort sites, a ferry connected the community of Castle Rock on the west shore with the east shore wagon road, then railway line, and ultimately the station at Marguerite. The Sing Lee Creek ferry, which existed in 1915–16, appears to be the forerunner of the government ferry. Officially called the Macalister ferry, the subsidised service was a.k.a. the Castle Rock ferry. Commencing as a canoe in 1917, a wooden reaction ferry was installed in 1921, which could carry vehicles and passengers.

A new ferry was built in 1941–42 and a new residence for the operator in 1944–45. While the ferry was withdrawn seasonally between December and March, an ice bridge was installed. By the early 1950s, a cage-like aerial passenger ferry had been erected for winter use.

Motorists temporarily crossed to the old road on the west side when the highway south of Quesnel closed after the Quesnel River bridge collapse in June 1954 and washouts in June 1955.

While driving onto the small ferry in April 1959, an automobile crashed through a guard chain and plunged into the river. The driver was rescued, but three other occupants drowned. Attempts to pull the vehicle out of the 9.1-metre (30 ft) deep water proved difficult. The bodies of two 12-year-old girls were found within months and a 38-year-old woman was discovered near Chilliwack that October.

In 1961–62, the ferry was partially rebuilt after flash flood damage. In 1964, the official name changed to Marguerite to avoid confusion with the community of Macalister 9.5 kilometres (5.9 mi) farther south. At this time, the hours were 7 am to noon, 1 pm to 5 pm, and 6 pm to 7 pm.

In 1977, the towers and concrete foundations were replaced.

In 1984, local protests prompted the province to reverse its decision to discontinue the ferry, but daily hours reduced from 15 to 10. However by 1991, hours had increased to 14 for the two-vehicle, 12-passenger ferry.

In 2002, the final ferry run occurred. Despite First Nation protests, the government announced in April 2003 that the service would not be resuming. The remnants of the abandoned residence stand beside the highway.

== Communities ==
By the 1910s, from north to south, the general areas straddling the river were Alexandria, Castle Rock, and Macalister. The arrival of the railway created Marguerite, which gained prominence over Castle Rock.

=== Early fort area ===
In 1859, Fort Alexandria was the common name of the fort and adjacent settlement. During that era of the Fraser Canyon Gold Rush, miners lived in tents and rough cabins. However, being merely a stopover on the way to the goldfields, the year-round population was minimal. The next year, the town was surveyed, but lots were not known to have been sold. The settlement comprised a saloon, restaurant, and several stores.

In 1860, Alexander Douglas McInnes acquired the HBC farmlands and resided a couple of miles south. He built a roadhouse for travellers to the goldfields. After the goldrush subsided, Quesnel became the distribution centre and Alexandria lost significance.

McInnes was the inaugural postmaster 1876–1904. By the late 1880s, a general store also existed. By 1910, the roadhouse had closed.

John Sandford Twan, born at the fort in 1853, remained a resident almost until his death in 1947.

=== Later Alexandria ===
In 1912, BC Express (BX) purchased land for a shipyard and winter berth. During the railway construction, both the BX and railway contractor boats used the Alexandria landing.

By 1918, a general store operated. By the next year, a school existed, but the initial name of Sisters Creek suggests it was to the north or relocated from there. Alexandria North was the subsequent name (largely to distinguish it from the long established Alexandria school on Vancouver Island), and the location had moved to south of Alexandria.

Our Lady of Perpetual Help RC church was erected in 1940, but closed in the late 1960s.

By 1940, a sawmill existed. By 1946, the more significant J. Earl McIntyre mill operated.

Joining Alexandria North in School District 28 Quesnel, the new Alexandria school (a Quonset type structure) opened in 1949–50. The Alexandria North school closed in 1953.

Matheson's Diamond Island Sawmill operated at least until the 1960s.

The Alexandria school closed in 1963, after which students were bussed to Quesnel.

Immediately south on the east side of the highway, a rusting beehive burner stands alone.

=== Castle Rock ===
Castle Rock is an unincorporated community on the west bank of the Fraser River between the cities of Williams Lake and Quesnel, British Columbia, Canada, located in that province's Cariboo Country opposite the community of Margeruite and near Alexandria. The geographical features of Castle Rock are a rocky outcrop and bar on the west shore of the Fraser River about 3.9 kilometres (2.4 mi) north of Alexandria, whereas the general community area is a long way farther south. Castle Rock is named for a rock outcrop of the same name on the Fraser River in that area.

The Castle Rock post office operated from a residence 1916–1943 and 1950–1951. A school opened in 1917.

In 1949, a Quonset type structure replaced the Castle Rock school building on the west side of the river. The school closed in 1956.

=== Marguerite ===
In 1885, Harry Moffat established Landsdowne Farm, a dairy ranch, in the vicinity of later Marguerite, where he remained a resident until 1927. In the early 1900s, the big ranch house served as a roadhouse for stages.

At Marguerite, Mary E. Rowed was the inaugural postmaster 1924–1937. By 1926, a general store existed.

A BP service station operated at Marguerite at least until the 1960s. The Marguerite rest area is about 800 metres (875 yd) south of the former ferry site.

== Railway ==
In early December 1920, the northward advance of the Pacific Great Eastern Railway (PGE) rail head reached Australian Creek, about 10 kilometres (6 mi) north of Alexandria, before activity ceased for the winter. After clearing landslides during the following spring, the line northward reopened to this point in early June 1921. Alexandria became a station that year.

In May 1956, a 27-metre (90 ft) deep and 15-metre (50 ft) wide washout near Marguerite closed the line for 11 days.

In 1960, a wooden trestle was constructed over Cuisson Creek on a new alignment about 11 metres (35 ft) west of the old trestle. In the mid-1980s, a fill replaced the bridge.

In October 1992, shots were fired at a passing freight train near Alexandria. The incident was one of several random acts of shooting at trains.

Train Timetables (Regular stop or Flag stop)
	Mile	1923	1936	1943	1950	1959	1969	1978	1986	1996	2001
Quesnel	347.0	Regular	Regular	Regular	Regular	Regular	Regular	Regular	Regular	Regular	Regular
Dragon	339.2	Flag	Flag	Flag	Flag	Flag	Flag		Flag		
Kersley	334.4	Flag	Regular	Regular	Flag	Flag			Flag		
Australian	327.8	Flag	Both	Both	Flag	Flag					
Alexandria	320.8	Flag	Flag	Flag	Flag	Flag	Flag	Flag	Flag	Flag	
Tingley	312.9	Flag									
Marguerite ^{a}	311.4		Regular	Regular	Regular	Flag					
Macalister	307.4	Flag	Both	Regular	Regular	Flag	Flag	Flag			
Soda Creek	298.6	Flag	Regular	Regular	Regular	Flag	Flag	Flag	Flag	Flag	Flag

^a. The station existed by 1925.

== Accidents and incidents ==
1963: A hunter in the vicinity of Marguerite was fatally shot by a companion when mistaken for a deer.

1964: Two youngsters discovered a canvas bag in a ditch near Alexandria containing almost $80,000 in stolen treasury cheques and about $10 in change.

1979: Speed and alcohol were factors when a fiery head-on collision between a car and a pickup truck near Alexandria killed nine people.

== Maps ==
- "Official motorist's guide of British Columbia". library.ubc.ca. 1931. p. 65 (28).
- "Shell BC map". www.davidrumsey.com. 1956.

== See also ==
- List of Inland Ferries in British Columbia
- List of crossings of the Fraser River
- List of National Historic Sites of Canada
