= Steamboats of the Skeena River =

Steamboats in a Canadian river

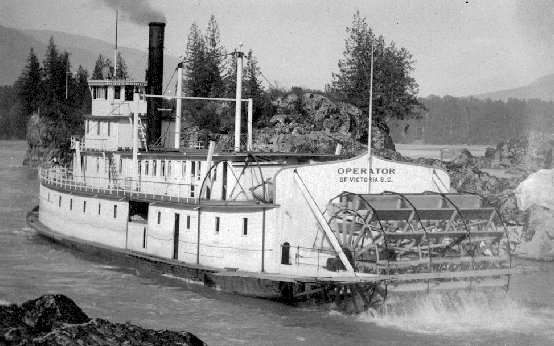
Operator on the Skeena River in 1911

The Skeena River is British Columbia's fastest flowing waterway, often rising as much as 17 feet (5.2 m) in a day and fluctuating as much as sixty feet between high and low water. For the steamboat captains, that wide range made it one of the toughest navigable rivers in British Columbia. Nevertheless, at least sixteen paddlewheel steamboats plied the Skeena River from the coast to Hazelton from 1864 to 1912.

== Pioneer sternwheelers ==
The first sternwheeler to arrive on the Skeena River was the Union, which was owned and operated by Captain Tom Coffin. On her first trip up from Victoria in 1864 she carried four passengers and 20 tons of freight. However, Coffin soon realized that he was not able to ascend the Skeena without more preparation, and the trip was declared a failure. In 1865, the Collin's Overland Telegraph Company chartered the Union, and Captain Coffin gave the Skeena another try. The Union fought her way upstream for 90 miles (140 km) and could not ascend any further. The telegraph company then decided to build their own sternwheeler, the Mumford, and she left Victoria under Captain Coffin in July 1866. This time Coffin travelled 110 miles (180 km) upstream, a feat he repeated three times, successfully delivering 150 miles (240 km) of material for the telegraph line and 12,000 rations for its workers. Passengers during these pioneer journeys did not enjoy a luxurious or relaxing trip. They were often kept busy with bucksaws and axes, helping chop wood for the ravenous boiler. The Mumford left the Skeena in October and berthed in New Westminster. That was the end of her adventures, as the Collins Telegraph Company went defunct when the transatlantic cable was successfully laid.

== Hudson's Bay Company and Robert Cunningham ==
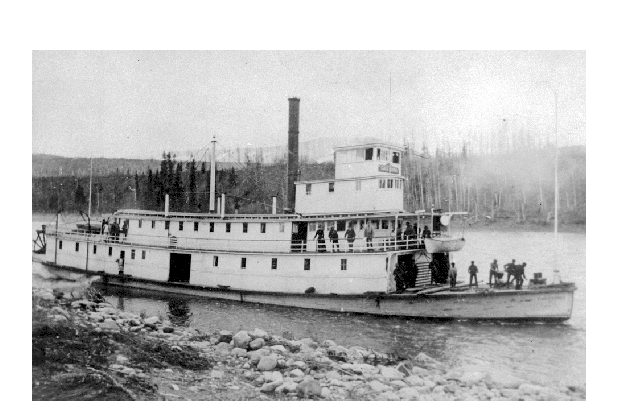
HBC Caledonia at Hazelton in 1901

When the Omineca Gold Rush began in 1869, it became profitable to attempt navigation on the Skeena again. The Omineca diggings could be easily reached from Hazelton, where a trail ran for 115 miles (185 km), passing Fort Babine and Takla Lake. At first, canoes were used to ship the supplies from the coast. Captain William Moore was under contract with the Hudson's Bay Company (HBC) to perform this service, and Robert Cunningham traded as an independent. This was gruelling and perilous work, as well as slow and expensive. The HBC decided in 1889 to build a sternwheeler, the Caledonia, and hired Captain George Odin to be her pilot. She was launched on February 28, 1891, at New Westminster and made her first trip to Hazelton that May, taking nine days to make the trip. The Caledonia was considered a success and began serving not only the Skeena River, but also the northern coastal regions. Captain John Bonser was hired on to be her captain, and in 1895 the Caledonia was overhauled and lengthened at his request, making her more manoeuvrable.

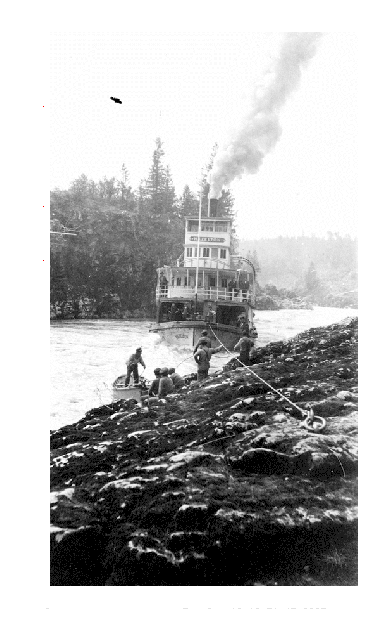
The Hazelton lining through Kitselas Canyon

Bonser named eleven of the canyons and rapids on the Skeena River, using the character of the obstacle as a guide. Among them were the Whirly Gig Rapids, Hornet's Nest Rapids and the Devil's Elbow Canyon, where the Skeena rushed directly towards a rock bluff before twisting off to the right. Despite these perils the Caledonia operated for seven seasons until the HBC replaced her with a new sternwheeler in 1898, also named the Caledonia. By this time, the Klondike Gold Rush was in full swing and there was more interest in the north than ever previously. Robert Cunningham had prospered during this period and now owned a cannery and a lumber mill. He decided that a sternwheeler would be a fine addition to his enterprises, and he bought the Monte Cristo and hired Captain Bonser away from the HBC to pilot it. The HBC built a second sternwheeler, the Strathcona, and were little concerned about Cunningham's rival vessel.

Then in 1900, Cunningham sent Bonser down to Victoria to design a sternwheeler. This would become the Hazelton, and under Bonser's command she soon proved to be superior to the other boats on the Skeena. In her first season, she went to Hazelton thirteen times, making the trip upstream in forty hours and downstream in ten. Realizing that the Strathcona and the Caledonia could not compete, the HBC built a third sternwheeler, the Mount Royal and hired Captain Johnson as her pilot. On her launch date, April 9, 1902, she got hung up during her launch, and after two hours was freed, only to get caught up again. A bad launch was considered to be an ill omen and, in this case, was one that would be fulfilled.

== Sternwheeler race on the Skeena ==
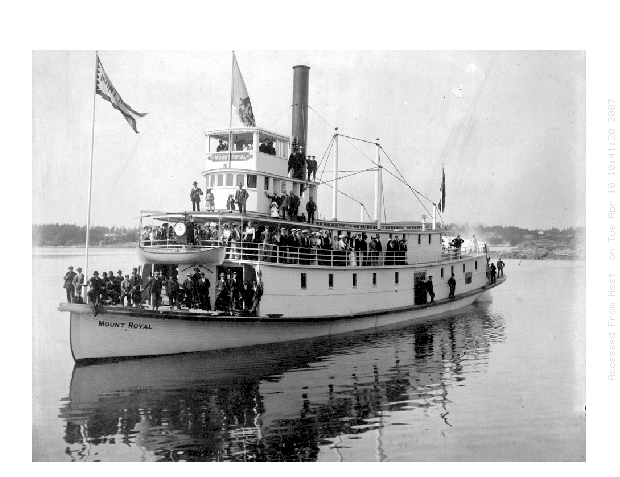
HBC Mount Royal in 1902

When the HBC's Mount Royal arrived at the Skeena, rivalry flared between her and the Robert Cunningham's Hazelton almost immediately, with each captain trying to beat the other's times to Hazelton and back. The standing order from both companies was "beat the other boat." Inevitably, this led to a side-by-side race, an old but dangerous tradition among sternwheelers. In the spring of 1904, both boats wanted to be the first one of the season to arrive in Hazelton. Captain Bonser started out in the Hazelton first, and while he was wooding-up 105 miles (169 km) upstream, he saw the Mount Royal with Johnson at the helm coming up from behind. Wooding-up was immediately ceased, and the Hazelton pulled into the stream as the Mount Royal approached, and they raced bow to bow. Slowly the Mount Royal gained on the Hazelton. Captain Bonser was having none of it, and he rammed the Mount Royal several times. Johnson lost control and the current carried her back downstream, bow first. Bonser wagged the Hazelton's stern at the Mount Royal, tooted the whistle and continued triumphantly upstream. Furious, Johnson left the pilothouse unattended to retrieve a rifle and shot at the departing Hazelton. Afterwards, Johnson laid charges on Bonser claiming he deliberately rammed the Mount Royal. Bonser claimed in his defence that it was an accident.

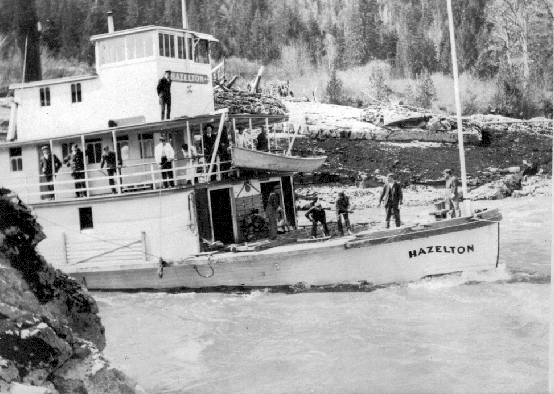
The Hazelton at Kitselas Canyon

The Federal Department of Marine investigated and decided that both captains were at fault, Bonser for ramming the Mount Royal, and Johnson for leaving the helm. The men were reprimanded and the case was closed.

The HBC and Robert Cunningham came to a mutual decision that the rivalry was not profitable and an agreement was reached to end it. The HBC paid Robert Cunningham $2,500 to tie up his vessel, and they hauled his freight for free. Later, the HBC bought the Hazelton. These new arrangements between the HBC and Robert Cunningham left Captain Bonser without a vessel until 1906 when he took command of the Pheasant, a small sternwheeler that was the butt of many jokes and nicknamed the "Chicken" because it had to scratch so hard to get upstream. She was wrecked that autumn in the Redrock Canyon, the first loss of Bonser's long career, although not his last. Bonser's next boat was the Northwest, which was owned by the Northern British Columbia Transportation Company, who also had a hotel and store at Telkwa. Her main purpose was to deliver liquor from the coast to hotels along the Skeena.

== Tragedy of the HBC Mount Royal ==
In 1907, Captain Johnson was still in charge of the Mount Royal. On the afternoon of July 6, he was returning from Hazelton and was steaming through the Kitselas Canyon, when disaster struck. A strong wind pushed her into a large rock formation named Ringbolt Island, wedging her crosswise against the current. She held while the passengers and crew scrambled to safety on the shore. Johnson assessed the situation and decided that the Mount Royal could be saved and with ten crewmen, he returned aboard. He had decided that the best way to deal with this problem was to use the capstan to winch the sternwheeler back over Ringboat Island. This proved to be a disastrous decision. The king post broke and rammed through the bottom of the Mount Royal, and she buckled as the current washed over her, then she rolled upside down and broke into pieces. Although Johnson survived, six of the crewmen drowned, including the first officer. One of the four survivors was rescued by George Little, who would later become the founder of the town of Terrace. George and a companion spotted the wrecked hull as the wreckage floated past the community of Kitselas. Curious, they paddled out to it and saw a hand waving at them from a hole in hull. The survivor was the Mount Royal's chief engineer, Ben Maddigan, who was trapped in the bilge and filthy, but unhurt. After Little chopped him out, he commented that there must have been some air down there. The exhausted engineer replied, "I don’t know about air, but there was one hell of a lot of water!"

Captain Johnson went on to pilot the new sternwheeler built to replace the Mount Royal, the HBC's Port Simpson. Two months after the Mount Royal was wrecked, another sternwheeler was lost on the Skeena. The Northwest, which would become Bonser's second loss, hit a rock and sank. There was no loss of life, but she was carrying the winter liquor supply for the towns along the Skeena, and her loss still caused a bit of uproar. In response to this minor crisis, the HBC refitted the Caledonia, and she ran an emergency trip up the Skeena with the much desired supplies. Bonser then moved on to the upper Fraser River in 1909, where he piloted two sternwheelers before returning to the Skeena in 1911.

== Grand Trunk Pacific's sternwheelers ==
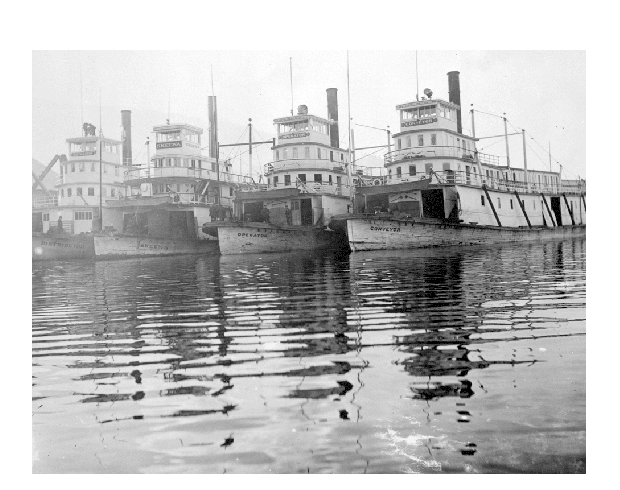
GTP's Distributor, Skeena, Operator and Conveyor in 1910

The Grand Trunk Pacific Railway's western terminus was at Prince Rupert, and rail construction began from there in 1908. The railway construction firm of Foley, Welch and Stewart built the Distributor and the Skeena and purchased the Omineca in 1908. The latter was wrecked later that summer near Port Essington, but her machinery was put in another sternwheeler, and she was rechristened under the same name in 1909. That same year Foley, Welch and Stewart launched two more steamers, the Operator and the Conveyor, which would be piloted by Captain Con Myers and Captain Jack Shannon, respectively. These five sternwheelers had their work cut out for them. The construction of the railway from Prince Rupert to Hazelton was one of the most difficult sections of track that would ever be laid in North America. This 186-mile (299 km) stretch would take nearly four years to build and would employ thousands of workers. Four of the company sternwheelers hauled material and supplies for construction, while a fifth, the Skeena, was used almost exclusively to supply food to the camps of the construction workers. Much of these supplies were provided by meatpacker Pat Burns, who had wisely anticipated this need and had a built slaughterhouse at Hazelton.

== Last sternwheeler ==
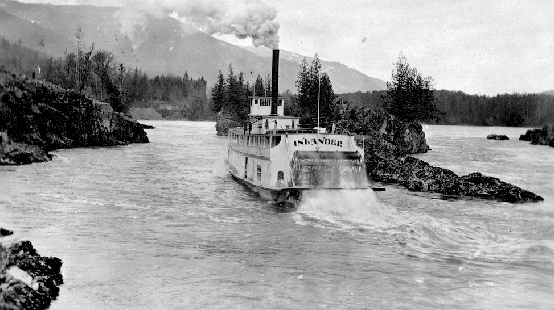
Inlander at Kitselas Canyon in 1911

In 1910, the last sternwheeler built for work on the Skeena River was the Inlander. She was owned by residents and businessmen of the area and was piloted by Captain Joseph Bucey for that season of navigation. In 1911, Bucey left for the upper Fraser River where he would work on the sternwheeler BC Express until 1921. Captain John Bonser, now back from the upper Fraser, replaced Bucey on the Inlander and piloted her for the 1911 and 1912 seasons. Then, that August, the rail line was finished to Hazelton, a death knell for the Inlander. She left Hazelton for the final time on September 13, 1912, under Captain Bonser. When she reached Port Essington, the Inlander was pulled up onto ways and left to rot. Like the Inlander, Captain Bonser had also made his last trip. He died on December 26, 1913.

== End of an era ==
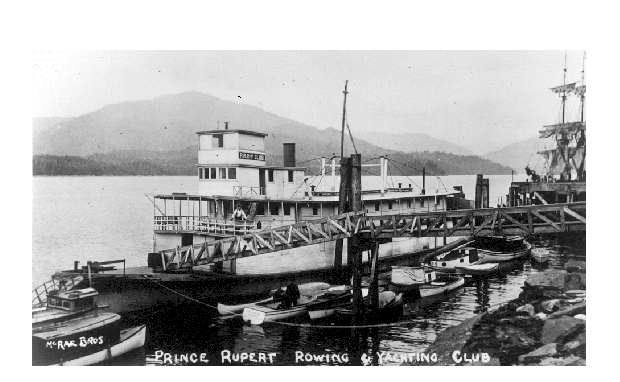
Hazelton as clubhouse

After 1912 the Skeena River was no longer used for river navigation by sternwheelers. The GTP boats, Operator and Conveyor, were dismantled; their machinery would be used in new sternwheelers that were built at Tête Jaune Cache for east end construction. Their pilots, Captain Myers and Captain Shannon, would stay with them until 1914 when the line was finished.

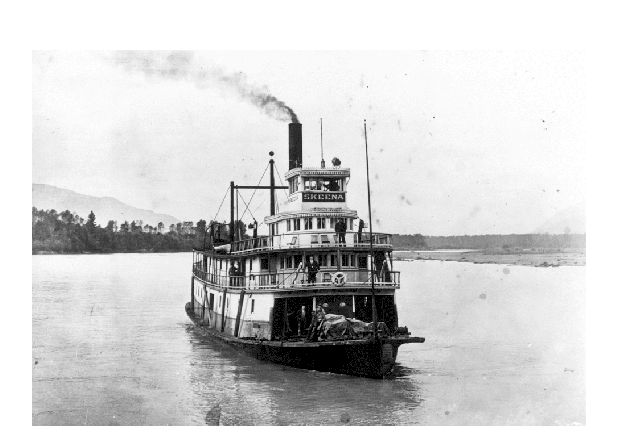
Skeena in 1913

The Distributor and the HBC Port Simpson were also dismantled and rebuilt and would later work together on the Mackenzie River. The HBC's Hazelton became the clubhouse for the Prince Rupert Yacht Club. The Skeena was purchased by Captain Seymour in 1914 and went on to work on the lower Fraser River. For eleven more years the devotion of her skipper-owner kept her plying the river past Surrey, Coquitlam, Maple Ridge, Langley and Mission. But when Captain Seymour died in 1925 she lost her only advocate. She was sold and converted to a floating barge for an oil company. Thus ended the last of the Skeena River sternwheelers.

== See also ==
- Skeena River
- Steamboats of the Columbia River
- Steamboats of the Mackenzie River
- Steamboats of the Peace River
- Steamboats of the Stikine River
- Steamboats of the Upper Fraser River in British Columbia
