= Hazelton (sternwheeler) =

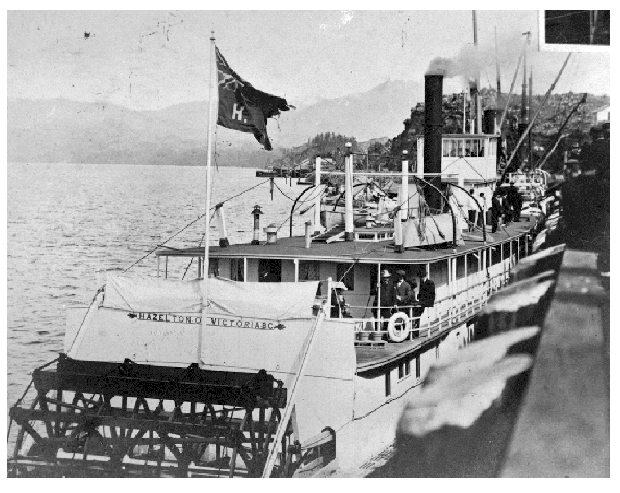
- Hazelton on the Skeena River

History

Canada
- Name: Hazelton
- Laid down: 1900 in Victoria, British Columbia
- Launched: 1901 for the Skeena River
- In service: 1901–1912
- Fate: Sold and converted to a clubhouse for the Prince Rupert Yacht Club
- Notes: Captain John Bonser 1901-04 Captain Joseph Bucey

Hazelton was a sternwheeler that worked on the Skeena River in British Columbia, Canada from 1901 until 1912. Her first owner was Robert Cunningham who ran a freighting business that served the communities along the Skeena River.

Hazelton was named after one of the communities she served, Hazelton, which was one of the oldest towns in Northern British Columbia, having been founded in 1866 and was the main staging area for the Omineca Gold Rush.

Robert Cunningham had Hazelton built to run against the sternwheelers of the Hudson's Bay Company, Caledonia and Strathcona. To design and pilot her, Cunningham hired veteran white-water skipper John Bonser, who went down to Victoria in the winter of 1900 to help in the details of her design and construction.

== The rivalry begins ==
Hazelton was launched in 1901 and soon proved that she was superior to the rival HBC vessels. In her first season, she made 13 trips to Hazelton, setting a new speed record by completing the 180-mile journey upstream from Port Essington to Hazelton in just forty hours. The trip back downstream was, of course, swifter yet and Hazelton routinely traveled it in ten hours. To compete against the Hazelton the HBC built another sternwheeler for the Port Essington-to-Hazelton route, the Mount Royal and launched her in 1902 under Captain SB Johnson.

== Sternwheeler race on the Skeena ==
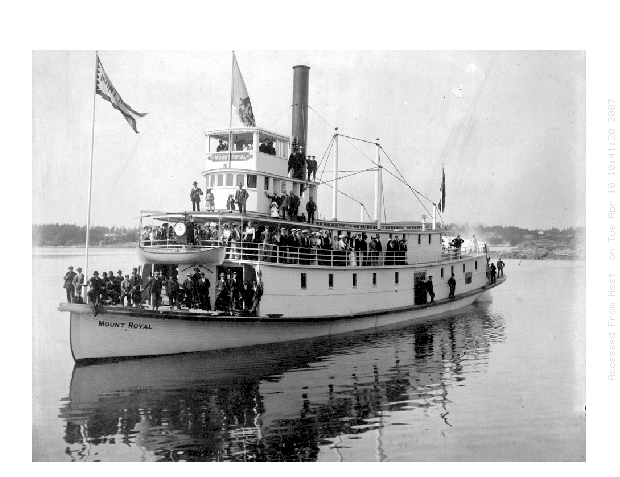
HBC Mount Royal

When HBC's Mount Royal arrived on the Skeena, rivalry flared between her and Hazelton almost immediately, with each captain trying to beat the other's times to Hazelton and back. The standing order from both Cunningham and the HBC was "beat the other boat." Inevitably, this led to a side-by-side race, an old but dangerous tradition among sternwheelers.

In the spring of 1904, both boats wanted to be the first one of the season to arrive in Hazelton. Captain Bonser started out in Hazelton first, and while he was wooding-up 105 miles upstream, he saw Mount Royal with Captain Johnson at the helm coming up from behind. Wooding-up was immediately ceased and Hazelton pulled into the stream as Mount Royal approached and they raced bow to bow. Slowly Mount Royal gained on Hazelton. Captain Bonser was having none of it and he rammed Mount Royal several times. Johnson lost control and the current carried her back downstream, bow first. Bonser wagged Hazelton’s stern at Mount Royal, tooted the whistle and continued triumphantly upstream. Furious, Johnson left the pilothouse unattended to retrieve a rifle and shot at the departing Hazelton. Afterwards, Johnson laid charges on Bonser claiming he deliberately rammed Mount Royal. Bonser claimed in his defense that it was an accident.

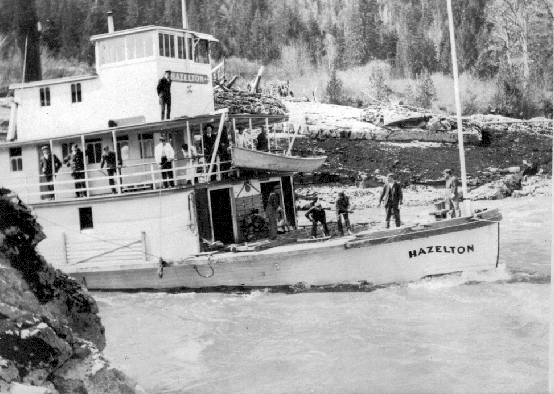
Hazelton at Kitselas Canyon

The Federal Department of Marine investigated and decided that both captains were at fault, Bonser for ramming Mount Royal, and Johnson for leaving the helm. The men were reprimanded and the case was closed.

The HBC and Robert Cunningham came to a mutual decision that the rivalry was not profitable and an agreement was reached to end it. The HBC paid Robert Cunningham $2,500 to tie up his vessel and they hauled his freight for free. Later, the HBC bought Hazelton.

== End of an era ==
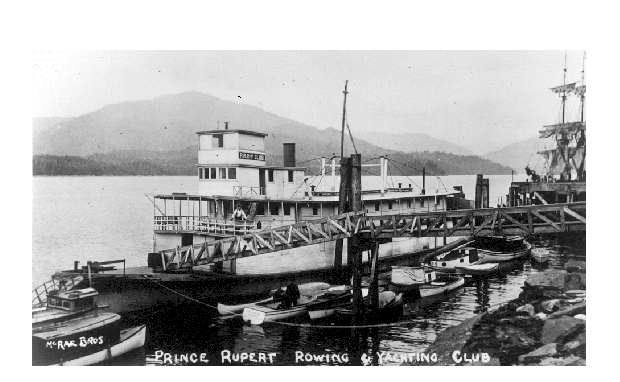
Hazelton as clubhouse at Prince Rupert

Hazelton would later come under the command of Captain Joseph Bucey and would work on the Skeena until 1912 when the construction of the Grand Trunk Pacific Railway was completed from Prince Rupert to Hazelton. Because the railway could now bring freight and passengers from the coast the sternwheelers were no longer required for the Skeena River and one by one they disappeared. Some like the Skeena and the Grand Trunk Pacific's Operator and Conveyor would go to work on other rivers, while others like Inlander would be pulled up on ways and left to rot. Hazelton was dismantled and her hull was sold to the Prince Rupert Yacht Club.

== References and further reading ==
- Downs, Art (1971). Paddlewheels on the Frontier Volume 1. Foremost Publishing. ISBN 0-88826-033-4.
- Bennett, Norma (1997). Pioneer Legacy: Chronicles of the Lower Skeena River. Dr. REM Lee Hospital Foundation. ISBN 0-9683026-0-2.
- Large, Dr. R.G. (1996). The Skeena River of Destiny. Heritage House Publishing Co. ISBN 1-895811-19-8.

== See also ==
- Steamboats of the Skeena River
- List of ships in British Columbia
