= Kitselas Canyon =

Canyon in Kitimat-Stikine Regional District, Canada

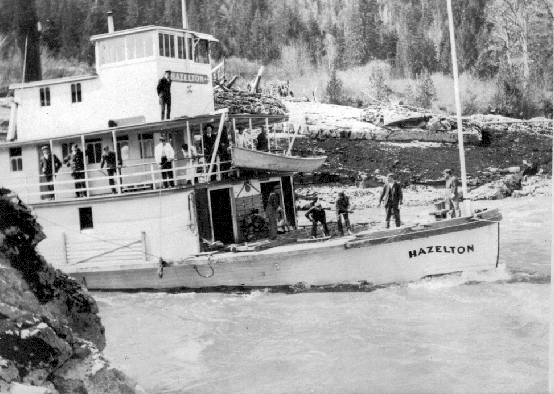
- Hazelton at Kitselas Canyon, 1900.

- Location of Kitselas Canyon in British Columbia
- Coordinates: 54°35′59″N 128°26′05″W
- Country: Canada
- Province: British Columbia
- Region: Skeena
- Regional district: Kitimat–Stikine
- Time zone: UTC-8 (PST)
  - Summer (DST): UTC-7 (PDT)
- Area codes: 250, 778, 236, & 672
- Highways: Highway 16 (TCH)
- Waterways: Skeena River
- Website: Official website

Kitselas Canyon is a canyon carved by the Skeena River in the Skeena region of west central British Columbia, Canada. Off BC Highway 16, the landmark is by road about 185 kilometres (115 mi) west of Smithers and 20 kilometres (12 mi) northeast of Terrace.

== Topography ==
Within the Canadian Cordillera, the canyon is roughly on the boundary between the Coast Mountains and the Intermontane Belt. The 1.7-kilometre (1.1 mi) north–south gorge cuts through the western extremity of the Hazelton Mountains. On the west side, the steep slopes rise to Kitselas Mountain, the highest peak. On the east side, the canyon walls rise 20 to 30 metres (66 to 98 ft) before forming a series of flat terraces, before rising to Bornite Mountain in the Bulkley Ranges.

In the deep gorge, a number of islands are exposed. Two rocky islands divide the river into four channels at high water and two at low, which creates vicious eddies during all seasons. At high water, a narrow rocky channel, called Canoe Passage, separates Ringbolt Island from the shore. On the upper ridge of this island was a wooden bridge destroyed by the floods of 1936 and 1948. About 5 kilometres (3 mi) southwest from Usk along the railway track is Totem Pole Island. This third rocky island can be reached from the bank throughout most of the year.

== First Nations ==
Kitselas means "people of the deep gorge or narrows".

Surrounded by the Kitselas First Nation Reserve 1, the canyon was designated a national historic site in 1972. Occupied for about 5,000 years, the locality includes petroglyphs, totem poles, culturally modified trees, and archaeological remains. During the 1800s, the two permanent Tsimshian settlements controlled trade, ultimately with the Hudson's Bay Company (HBC). The two villages were the fortified Gitlaxdzawk (meaning "people of the ravine"), which stood on the promontory in the midst of the canyon on the west bank, and the Gitsaex (meaning "people at the edge of the lake"), which was at the north end on the east bank. Both sites were in decline by the 1870s on track to abandonment.

Totem Pole Island contains several standing or fallen totems and evidence of community houses, which once stood on the ridge. In the 1920s and 1930s, passenger trains stopped and travellers could reach the poles by crossing a wooden bridge. At that time, the railway had paid to restore the totems which were then bolted to posts and set in concrete. By the 1960s, nettles, prickly bushes, and trees obscured the view.

The current passenger transit provider to the east shore is BC Transit.

== Steamboats ==
After rock ridges and cliffs were blasted in the late 1880s, steamboats were able to pass through the canyon.

In 1891, the HBC SS Caledonia was the first steamboat to navigate the ravine. Steamboat captains regarded it as the most difficult and dangerous of the regularly navigated canyons. The location was called Big Canyon to differentiate it from the Little Canyon at Terrace.

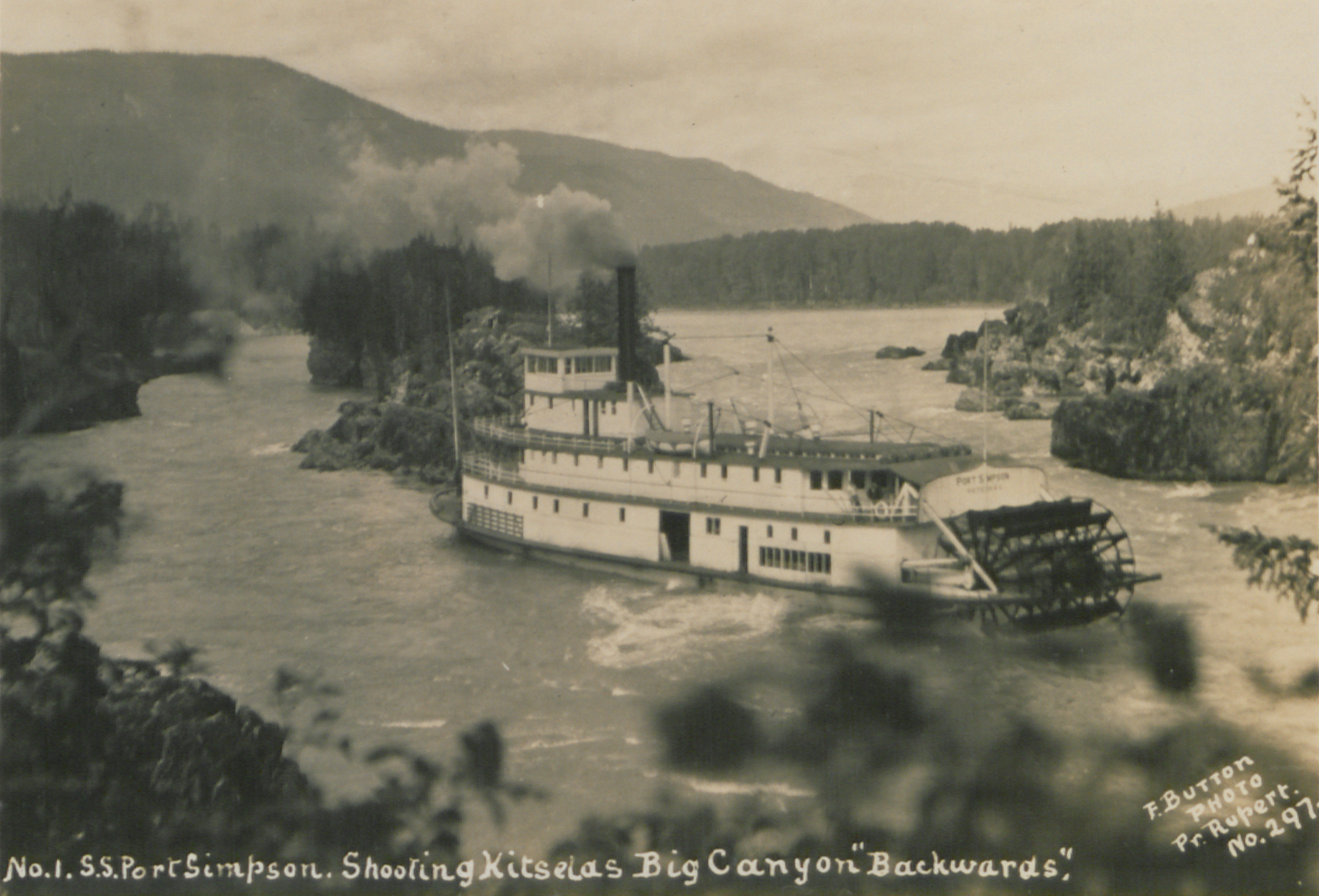
Port Simpson, Kitselas Canyon, 1912.

In 1907, a strong wind pushed the HBC SS Mount Royal into Ringbolt Island. During an attempt to dislodge from the rocks, the vessel broke up and six crew members died.

To traverse the turbulent water, steamboats were winched using steel cables attached to rings cemented into the canyon walls. Foley, Welch and Stewart (FW&S), the Grand Trunk Pacific Railway (GTP) prime contractor, installed donkey engines on the shore for this purpose.

In 1909, the HBC completed a warehouse at the upper canyon, which collapsed in a severe gale later that year.

In October 1911, when the Skeena steamboats were withdrawn for the winter, the end of the steamboat era was evident. By the time of ice breakup the following spring, the railway would be well on the way eastward to Hazelton. As expected, regular scheduled steamboat service never resumed in 1912. That year, the only two sternwheelers remaining on the Skeena were the HBC Port Simpson and the chartered FW&S Inlander.

== Kitselas ==
The settlement was established next to the reserve on the east shore.

The earliest newspaper mention of the name is November 1906. J.W. Patterson (alternative spelling Paterson) became the mining recorder and opened a general store that year and was the inaugural postmaster 1906–1914.

Charles William Digby Clifford owned the 200-lot townsite when surveyed. During the GTP construction boom, land values rose sharply but subsequently plummeted. Clifford built a store and hotel in 1907, the only licensed premises for the railway construction crews. A second hotel operated by 1908, presumably the Patterson one.

A police post existed at least 1908–1911, and the associated jail was erected in 1909. That year, the Big Canyon Weekly newspaper was established, and P. Burns & Co built a cold storage plant, which was moved out the next summer.

By 1910, several stores existed. (Image). That year, the post office installed 61 mailboxes, the Big Canyon hotel installed a bath, and the Big Canyon Weekly was renamed the Inland Colonist. A branch of the Union Bank planned to open mid-year.

In mid-1911, a Continental Trust Co branch did open, and the Inland Colonist relocated to Hazelton. Within months, stores began closing.

Although the Big Canyon hotel/store did not advertise beyond 1912, J.W. Patterson may have operated the business into 1914. However on closing, the cellars were not completely cleared, because three barrels of whiskey worth $1,000 were discovered in 1916.

Once the settlement became largely isolated, residents moved to Usk or farther afield. In 1917, the post office closed. By then, the jail was abandoned but not completely cleared of government property. By 1919, only one resident remained.

== Railway ==
In 1908, a GTP engineer surveying to the north broke a leg in two places in a serious accident.

At the northern end of the canyon on the eastern shore, the FW&S camp 11 included warehouses, a general store, and hospital. All eight steamers would dock at the wharves, which made the place a hive of activity.

In 1910, an aerial tramway was installed to run along the eastern side of the canyon from the southern end shoreline to the top of the hill. To avoid passing northward through the canyon, freight was unloaded from steamboats, carried up the slope by the cable, loaded onto wagons, hauled downhill to the wharves, and reloaded onto steamboats for the journey farther upstream. (Image).

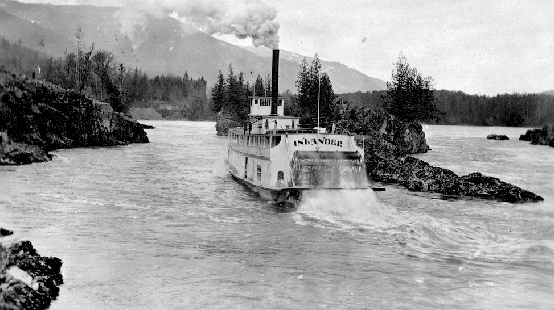
Inlander, Kitselas Canyon, 1911.

Where Usk is defined as about mile 119.2 westward, the railway tunnels of the canyon are at miles 121.9 (377 metres (1,238 ft)), 122.1 (61 metres (201 ft)), 122.3 (169 metres (555 ft)), and 122.8 (284 metres (931 ft)). In February 1911, two tunnel explosions killed three and five workers respectively. A possible third explosion that August killed a further worker. In October, a landslide buried alive two tunnel workers.

In November 1910, the advance of the GTP rail head from Prince Rupert passed through mile 100 eastward, reaching Newtown at mile 102 (western end of the tunnels), where it halted for over a year. In mid-January 1912, tracklaying proceeded through the tunnels.

In 2010, a westbound Canadian National Railway (CN) train fatally struck a man who wandered onto the tracks.

== Durham ==
Durham was on the west shore opposite Kitselas. A HBC freight shed was used prior steamers operating above the canyon. Freight was unloaded, carried overland, and reloaded into canoes at the northern end of the canyon. The adjacent Government Telegraph Office was a three-room building occupied by operator Frank Boss. Charles Durham (born Carl Joseph Halvar Dorum) arrived in 1903 to be linesman for the government telegraph. The family lived in the telegraph office until their house was built on that side of the river upon their pre-emption. During the following summers, the family cleared their land and burned stumps.

In 1910, the sale of Durham townsite lots was advertised as imminent. However, the project received no further mention.

In 1915, the government telegraph office moved to Usk, because the diminished Kitselas could not sustain this office across the river. When Charles Durham was the final Kitselas postmaster 1915–1917, the post office was at his residence. In 1917, the Durham family moved to Usk.

== Ferry ==
The ferry connected the two shores at the southern end of the canyon. In 1910, a two-year ferry charter covering one mile up and downstream was tendered. During 1910–1914, the ferry connected settlers on the east shore with the GTP construction activity and settlers on the west shore. The final two-year tender occurred in 1912.

== Maps ==
- Kitsalas cropped map. 1915.
- Kitsalas complete map. 1915.
- "Standard Oil BC map". www.davidrumsey.com. 1937.
- "Shell BC map". www.davidrumsey.com. 1956.
