= Inlander =

British Columbia sternwheeler

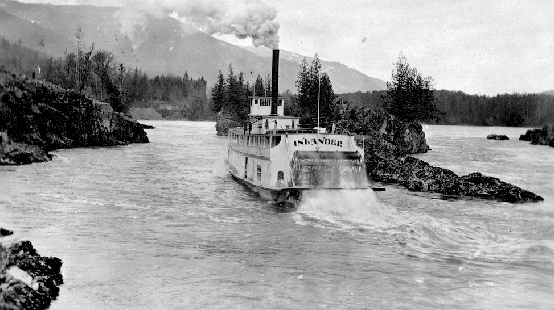
- Inlander on the Skeena River

History

Canada
- Name: Inlander
- Builder: Spratt shipyards at Victoria, British Columbia
- Laid down: 1909 in Victoria
- Launched: spring of 1910 for the Skeena River
- In service: 1910–1912
- Fate: Abandoned at Port Essington, British Columbia
- Notes: Captain Joseph Bucey 1910-11 Captain John Bonser 1911-12

General characteristics
- Length: 135 ft (41.1 m)
- Beam: 28 ft (8.5 m)
- Draft: 17 in (0.43 m) empty 30 in (0.76 m) loaded
- Speed: 12 knots

Inlander was a sternwheeler that worked on the Skeena River in British Columbia, Canada, from 1910 until 1912. She was owned by the Prince Rupert and Skeena River Navigation Company which was a syndicate of Skeena River businessmen who planned to use the Inlander as a passenger and freight steamer during the busy years of Grand Trunk Pacific Railway construction.

Her route took her from Port Essington to Hazelton, over 290 km (180 mi) of one of the most treacherous rivers that was ever used for steam navigation.

== Captains and crew ==
The Inlander's first captain was Joseph Bucey, who had been the pilot of the sternwheeler Hazelton. Some of the other officers were Robert Ryder, who was the chief engineer and Jerry Cunningham, the ship's mate. Wiggs O'Neill was the purser. O'Neill became the foremost historian on the Skeena River sternwheelers and in his later years wrote Steamboat Days on the Skeena River and Whitewater Men of the Skeena. Wiggs Creek near Smithers is named in his honour.

Captain Bucey left the Inlander in 1911 and appeared the following year as the captain of the BC Express on the Fraser River.

For the rest of the 1911 season and through to her final voyage in the fall of 1912, the Inlander was piloted by Captain John Bonser. It was fitting that Bonser piloted the last sternwheeler on the Skeena River, as he had pioneered it twenty years earlier in 1892 for the Hudson's Bay Company in the Caledonia, naming many of the rapids and canyons along the route. The Inlander was the last of many notable riverboats under Bonser's command, among them, the Nechacco and the Northwest.

== Final voyage ==
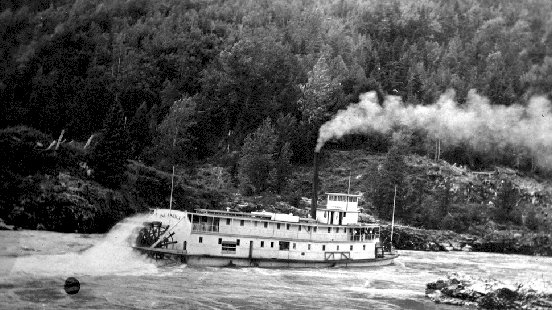
Inlander on Skeena River 1911

By 1912, the Grand Trunk Pacific Railway had reached Hazelton from Prince Rupert and sternwheelers were no longer required on the Skeena River. One by one they departed until the Inlander was the last one left. Some like the Operator, Conveyor and Skeena went on to work on the Fraser River, while others like the Hazelton were dismantled. The Inlander left Hazelton for the final time at noon on September 10, 1912. Captain Bonser blew the Inlander's whistle as a final farewell to the crowd that had gathered on the shore. When she reached Port Essington, the Inlander was pulled up onto her slipway and simply left to rot. Like the Inlander, Captain Bonser had also made his final voyage. He died the following year on December 26, 1913.

== Historical artifacts ==
The Inlander's paddlewheel shaft (or axle) was recovered years after she had perished in Port Essington. The shaft is now on public display in Halezeton. A large scale replica model of the Inlander was built by Lyle Krum (Terrace, British Columbia). It is on display at a museum near Terrace.

== See also ==
- Steamboats of the Skeena River
- List of historical ships in British Columbia

== References and further reading ==
- Bennett, Norma (1997). Pioneer Legacy: Chronicles of the Lower Skeena River. Dr. REM Lee Hospital Foundation. ISBN 0-9683026-0-2.
- Downs, Art (1971). Paddlewheels on the Frontier Volume 1. Foremost Publishing. ISBN 0-88826-033-4.
