= Grand Canyon of the Fraser =

Gorge carved by the Fraser River in British Columbia, Canada

Grand Canyon
- Location of Grand Canyon in British Columbia
- Coordinates: 53°56′00″N 121°39′00″W
- Country: Canada
- Province: British Columbia
- Region: Robson Valley
- Regional district: Fraser–Fort George

The Grand Canyon of the Fraser is a short gorge on the upper Fraser River in the Robson Valley region of east central British Columbia. The location, about 6 kilometres (4 mi) south-southwest of Hutton, became part of the Sugarbowl-Grizzly Den Provincial Park and Protected Area in 2000. The canyon head was about 171 kilometres (106 mi) by river from Fort George, and is about 100 kilometres (62 mi) due east of downtown Prince George.

The name is commonly confused even by journalists with the Fraser Canyon, which runs south from the city of Williams Lake to the town of Hope.

== Locale ==
The canyon is about 2 kilometres (1.2 mi) in length. Striking Green's Rock in the upper rapids was the single largest contributor to deaths. Allegedly, a surveyor called Green died there around 1908. The two sets of falls in the upper canyon, each about 0.6-metre (2 ft) high, were surrounded by large hazardous boulders. In 1912, Foley, Welch and Stewart (FW&S), the principal contractor for the Grand Trunk Pacific Railway (GTP), engaged Frank Freeman to dynamite the boulders. The falls also disappeared, increasing the dangerous current.

A lake connects the upper and lower rapids. During high water, a huge whirlpool in the lower rapids pulled small vessels under. Eddies form whirlpools 5-to-6-metre (15 to 20 ft) deep, and 2-to-3-metre (8 to 10 ft) wide, which can suck in large floating objects.

== First Nations and explorers ==
First Nations people have travelled the river in canoes for generations. In 1825, James McMillan surveyed a trail along the upper river for the Hudson's Bay Company (HBC). In March 1827, George McDougall trekked upstream along the frozen river.

When high water, First Nations would portage canoe contents, and sometimes canoes themselves, around the canyon. Between 1906 and 1910, First Nations crews earned good money piloting GTP surveyors through the whitewater and were highly regarded for their river skills. Crews left vulnerable valuables, such as watches, with the portage party, which would trek around the obstacle.

== Overlanders and successors ==
In 1860, four prospectors carrying $1,600 in gold successfully travelled upstream, possibly inspiring the Overlanders. The first recorded drowning was one of the Overlanders in 1862. The party lost 10 scouting canoes at this spot. They portaged their supplies around the first two stretches of wild water. For the third stretch, a small crew remained on the rafts loaded with supplies. Although sustaining some damage, each craft reached safety below. Back upriver, seven stragglers fell overboard and one drowned. Later that month, another victim drowned.

The next year, a small party traversed the canyon, but three died. Account details differ widely, but the essence of the story was that their craft was swamped and the men were marooned either on the sandbar in the middle of the river or on an inaccessible part of the shore. In due course, all died, but one had been cannibalized.

In winter 1874–75, a survey team, comprising eight men with six dog sleds, passed upstream along the frozen river. In the early 1880s, Sandford Fleming and his survey team came downstream.

== Railway anticipated ==
In 1909, the Nechacco was the first sternwheeler to navigate the treacherous canyon, assisted by ropes to the shores. Over the following years, sternwheelers were winched up the rapids by ropes that connected onboard capstans with rings placed in the canyon walls. That year, a three-man survey party heading upriver lost their canoe and supplies. In 1910, the small steamer Fort Fraser passed through en route to Tête Jaune, and George Williams paddled a 13-metre (42 ft) dugout canoe both ways for the HBC.

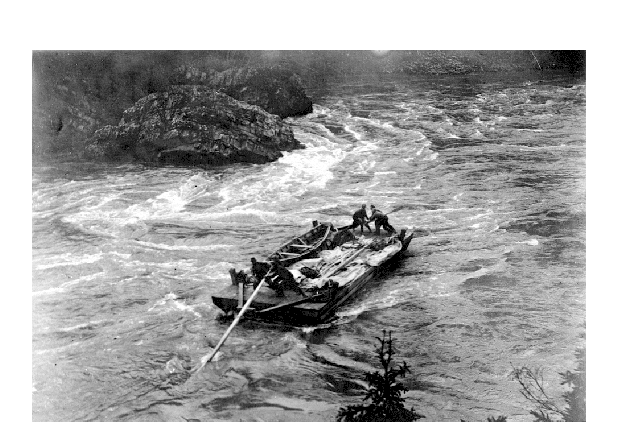
Scow at Grand Canyon, 1908

In wintertime, dog sleds hauled along the snow-covered ice.

Canoes carried supplies upstream from Fort George to GTP surveyors above the canyon. Capsizing and drownings were common. Fort George also supplied crews clearing and grading eastward from Tête Jaune. In July 1912, when the rail head reached westward to that point, the freight direction switched from upriver to downriver, carried largely on scows. FW&S launched numerous scows to transport supplies and equipment to advance depots along the railway right-of-way.

A group of rivermen, called canyon cats, charged steep fees to pilot various craft through the canyon. A scow could be carrying 20 or 30 tons of freight. However, new settlers would often portage their personal possessions around the canyon, hoping to meet their raft downstream.

The sternwheelers Operator and Conveyor were transported in pieces to Tête Jaune, reassembled, and relaunched in 1912. FW&S used these vessels on the Fraser run to the canyon. Powerboats also moved scows through the rapids. Roy Spurr (later at Willow River, Penny, and Upper Fraser) operated a café and rooming house during 1912 and 1913 above the canyon.

During summer 1912, FW&S built a huge warehouse above the upper canyon, connected by a horse tramway to a reloading warehouse at the lake. Freight was unloaded from the sternwheelers, sent by tramway, and reloaded onto scows for supplying the construction camps. That summer, using 30 tons of dynamite, experienced rock men removed some of the larger obstructions from the steamboat channel here and at other Fraser rapids. Although not limited to the canyon, 80 were reported drowned prior to the river freezing in 1912. That winter, hundreds of horse teams hauled freight to the canyon.

== Railway advancing ==
Following the 1913 thaw, wrecks and drownings continued despite the improved river flow. During the spring high water, a whirlpool sucked down and destroyed a FW&S scow carrying a mile of steel cable, a hoisting boiler, and steel rails, but the crew reached shore safely. When a J.M. Olsen & Co. scow struck a rock, the impact sent Mike Johnson overboard and knocked the steersman unconscious. Sucked under, Johnson, a strong swimmer, managed to reboard. Clearing the canyon, they completed the journey without further mishap. On its first round trip for the season, the sternwheeler B.C. Express required three lines to navigate the canyon going upriver, but when returning ran the canyon untethered and without difficulty. This steamer carried the mail between Fort George and Tête Jaune, the only vessel offering a scheduled service.

From June, an onsite police constable ensured each scow doubled its crew to eight men and offloaded for portaging any cargo in excess of 15 tons. Large warning signs were placed above the canyon at this time. FW&S stationed a boat in the lake for rescuing survivors from upper canyon mishaps. Of the 12 drownings reported for the period to early August, the only body recovered was at Mile 176, three miles below the canyon.

From August, the low-level rail bridge erected at Dome Creek blocked steamer traffic, ending an era. Charles S. Sager operated a barber shop/bathhouse on a good-sized scow from September 1913, prior to establishing a bathhouse in Prince George in early 1915.

== Later years ==
Around 1911, all drowned from a raft carrying about 20 Chinese. During summer 1936, an inexperienced adventurer in an inflatable canoe survived the rapids. In 1937, a capsizing canoe almost resulted in drownings below the canyon. From the 1920s to the 1960s, sawmills drove logs through the canyon. Ray Mueller of Longworth was one of the most experienced canyon users. In 1966, he blasted the top off Green's Rock. In 1961, a helicopter carrying three people struck an unmarked cable and plummeted into the river, with one fatality. Up to 200 people are believed drowned over the years.

Some scenes in Overlanders, tv movie (1979), were filmed at the canyon. Jack Boudreau from Penny and Glen Hooker from Bend were riverboat operators who ferried personnel and equipment to site. Recreational trails were established in the late 1980s.
