= Inlander (disambiguation) =

Inlander was a Canadian ship built in 1910.

Inlander may refer to:

- Native Indonesians (pribumi or bumiputera), known as Inlanders during colonial era of Dutch East Indies
- Mainland Chinese, sometimes called Inlanders

== See also ==
- The Inlander (disambiguation)
