= John Bonser =

John Bonser may refer to:

- Boof Bonser (John Paul Bonser, born 1981), US baseball pitcher
- John Bonser (steamship captain) (1855–1913)
- John Winfield Bonser (1847–1914), British barrister and judge
