= John Bonser (steamship captain) =

US-Canadian seaman (1855–1913)

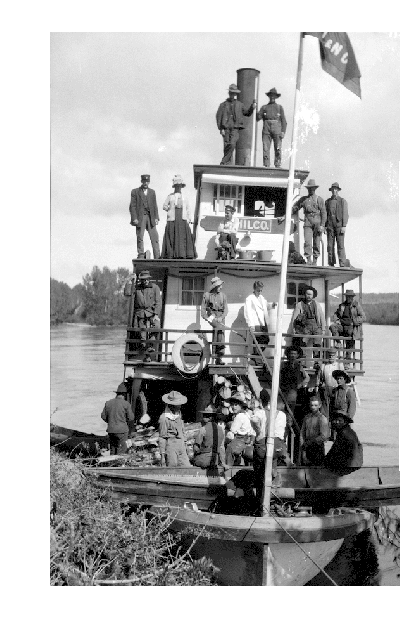
Captain Bonser and Ida (upper left) on the Chilco (1910)

John Henry Bonser (1855-1913) was a steamship captain from Oregon, United States and British Columbia, Canada. He piloted dozens of sternwheelers over his 40-year-long career and pioneered many rivers in the Pacific Northwest.

John was born in 1855 at Sauvie Island near the banks of the Columbia River in Oregon, the second son of James Halstead Bonser. Riverboating was a tradition in the Bonser family, as both John's father and grandfather had been rivermen on the Scioto and Ohio rivers.

== Oregon ==
In 1871, when John was 16, he and his older brother, Thomas Albert Bonser, left home and began working on riverboats on the Cowlitz, Lewis and Columbia rivers, doing everything from piloting the crafts to cooking in the galleys. Then in 1880, Albert drowned while working as a deckhand on the sternwheeler Latona. John considered quitting the river trade, but told his family that he would never let any river beat him.

For the next thirty-one years, he would keep that promise and would gain the reputation of being one of the best swift-water pilots in the business.

In 1881 John married Ida English and built a home in Woodland, Washington. On many occasions Ida would travel with John, even when their children, daughter, Viroqua, and son, Francisco, were born, the family would live on whatever sternwheeler John was piloting at the time. Ida would take the wheel if John was called away on an emergency and provided nursing care to sick or injured passengers and crew. When John began designing his own sternwheelers, he always made sure that a living quarters was built so that his family could accompany him.

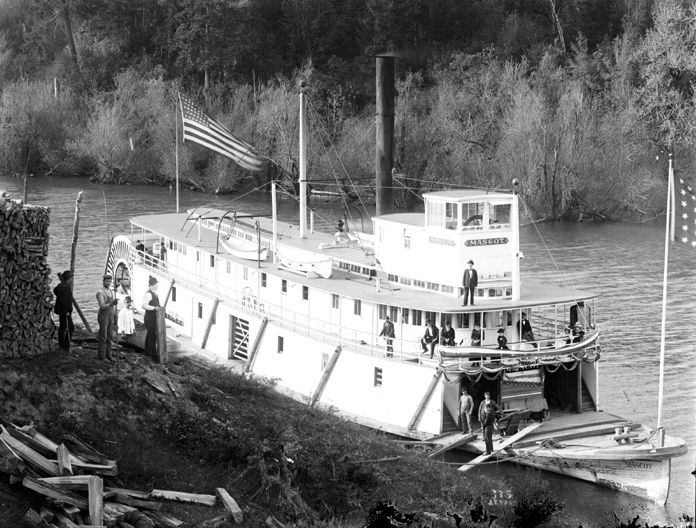
sternwheeler Mascot wooding up, somewhere on the Columbia or Lewis rivers, circa 1900

In 1882, John became the master of the Latona on the Lewis River and then went on to captain the "Queen of the Riverboats" on the Lewis, the Mascot, which offered daily service to Portland, and provided important transportation and delivery services for the settlements along the river.

== British Columbia ==
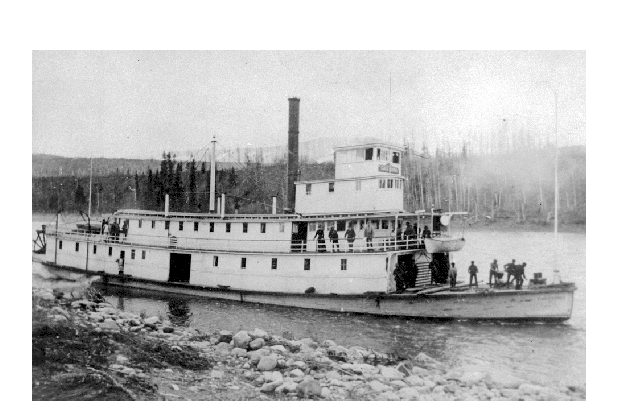
Hudson's Bay Company Caledonia

In 1892, John Bonser was contacted by Captain George Odin, a Fraser River captain, who was currently employed by the Hudson's Bay Company to navigate a route on the Skeena River from Port Essington to Hazelton. Several attempts had been made by other pilots to navigate the treacherously swift Skeena River but none had been successful. Part of Odin's letter read, "We understand that you have the reputation of not being afraid to take a steamboat over Niagara Falls, across the Sahara Desert or from hell to breakfast. We've got the boat here and we want a man to take it into the mountains. If you think you can do it the job is yours."

The boat in question was the Caledonia. Bonser took the job and he and his family moved to British Columbia, building a home in Vancouver.

The Caledonia was considered a success and began serving not only the Skeena River, but also the northern coastal regions. In 1895, the Caledonia was overhauled and lengthened at Bonser's request, making her more maneuverable. Bonser named eleven of the canyons and rapids on the Skeena River, using the character of the obstacle as a guide. Among them were the Whirly Gig Rapids, Hornet’s Nest Rapids and the Devil’s Elbow Canyon where the Skeena rushed directly towards a rock bluff before twisting off to the right. Despite these perils the Caledonia operated for seven seasons.

By 1898, the Klondike Gold Rush was in full swing and there was more interest in the north than ever previously. A business rival of the Hudson's Bay Company, Robert Cunningham, bought the Monte Cristo and hired Captain Bonser away from the HBC to pilot it. Then in 1900, Cunningham sent Bonser down to Victoria to design a sternwheeler specifically for the Skeena River. This would become the Hazelton and under Bonser’s command she soon proved to be superior to all the other boats on the river. In her first season, she went to Hazelton thirteen times, making the trip upstream in forty hours and downstream in ten. Realizing that the new HBC sternwheeler Strathcona and the Caledonia could not compete, the HBC built a third sternwheeler, the Mount Royal and hired Captain Johnson as her pilot.

=== Sternwheeler race on the Skeena River ===
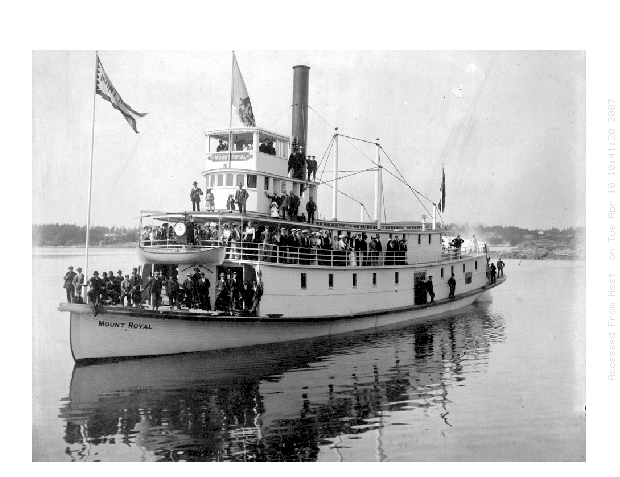
HBC Mount Royal

When Captain Johnson's Mount Royal arrived at the Skeena, rivalry flared between her and Bonser’s Hazelton almost immediately, with each captain trying to beat the other's times to Hazelton and back. The standing order from both companies was "beat the other boat." Inevitably, this led to a side-by-side race, an old but dangerous tradition among sternwheelers.

In the spring of 1904, both boats wanted to be the first one of the season to arrive in Hazelton. Captain Bonser started out in the Hazelton first, and while he was wooding-up 105 miles upstream, he saw the Mount Royal with Johnson at the helm coming up from behind.

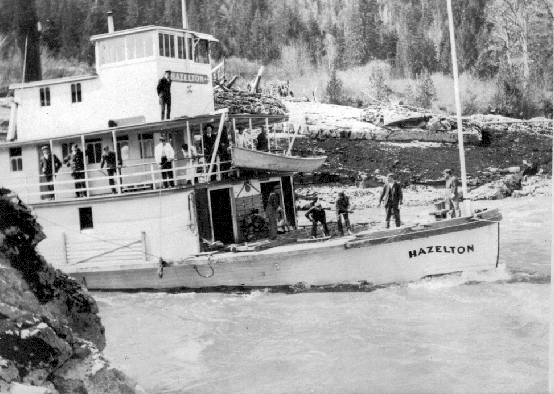
The Hazelton at Kitselas Canyon

Wooding-up was immediately ceased and the Hazelton pulled into the stream as the Mount Royal approached and they raced bow to bow. Slowly the Mount Royal gained on the Hazelton. Captain Bonser was having none of it and he rammed the Mount Royal several times. Johnson lost control and the current carried her back downstream, bow first. Bonser wagged the Hazelton’s stern at the Mount Royal, tooted the whistle and continued triumphantly upstream. Furious, Johnson left the pilothouse unattended to retrieve a rifle and shot at the departing Hazelton. Afterwards, Johnson laid charges on Bonser claiming he deliberately rammed the Mount Royal. Bonser claimed in his defense that it was an accident. The Federal Department of Marine investigated and decided that both captains were at fault, Bonser for ramming the Mount Royal, and Johnson for leaving the helm. The men were reprimanded and the case was closed.

The HBC and Robert Cunningham came to a mutual decision that the rivalry was not profitable and an agreement was reached to end it. Cunningham tied up his vessel, and the HBC hauled his freight for free. Later, the HBC bought the Hazelton. The new arrangements between the HBC and Robert Cunningham left Captain Bonser without a vessel until 1906 when he took command of the Pheasant, a small sternwheeler that was the butt of many jokes and nicknamed the "Chicken" because it had to scratch so hard to get upstream. She was wrecked that autumn in the Redrock Canyon, the first loss of Bonser’s long career, although not his last. Bonser’s next boat was the Northwest, which was owned by the Northern British Columbia Transportation Company, a company which also had a hotel and store at Telkwa. The Northwest's main purpose was to deliver liquor from the coast to hotels along the Skeena.

In September 1907, the Northwest was lost, when she hit a rock and sank. There was no loss of life, but she was carrying the winter liquor supply for the towns along the Skeena, and her loss still caused a bit of uproar. In response to this minor crisis, the HBC refitted the Caledonia and she ran an emergency trip up the Skeena with the much desired supplies. Bonser then moved on to the upper Fraser River in 1909, where he would pilot two sternwheelers before returning to the Skeena in 1911.

=== Upper Fraser River ===
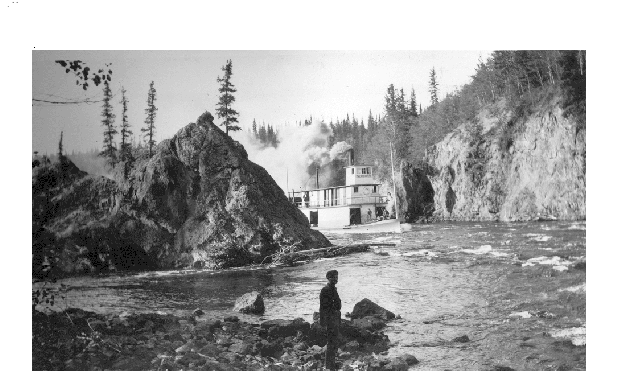
Nechacco on the Nechako River (1909)

In 1909, John Bonser was hired by the Fort George Lumber and Navigation Company of South Fort George to pilot the Nechacco, which would later be renamed the Chilco. Under his command the Nechacco would be the first sternwheeler to navigate the treacherous Grand Canyon of the Fraser.

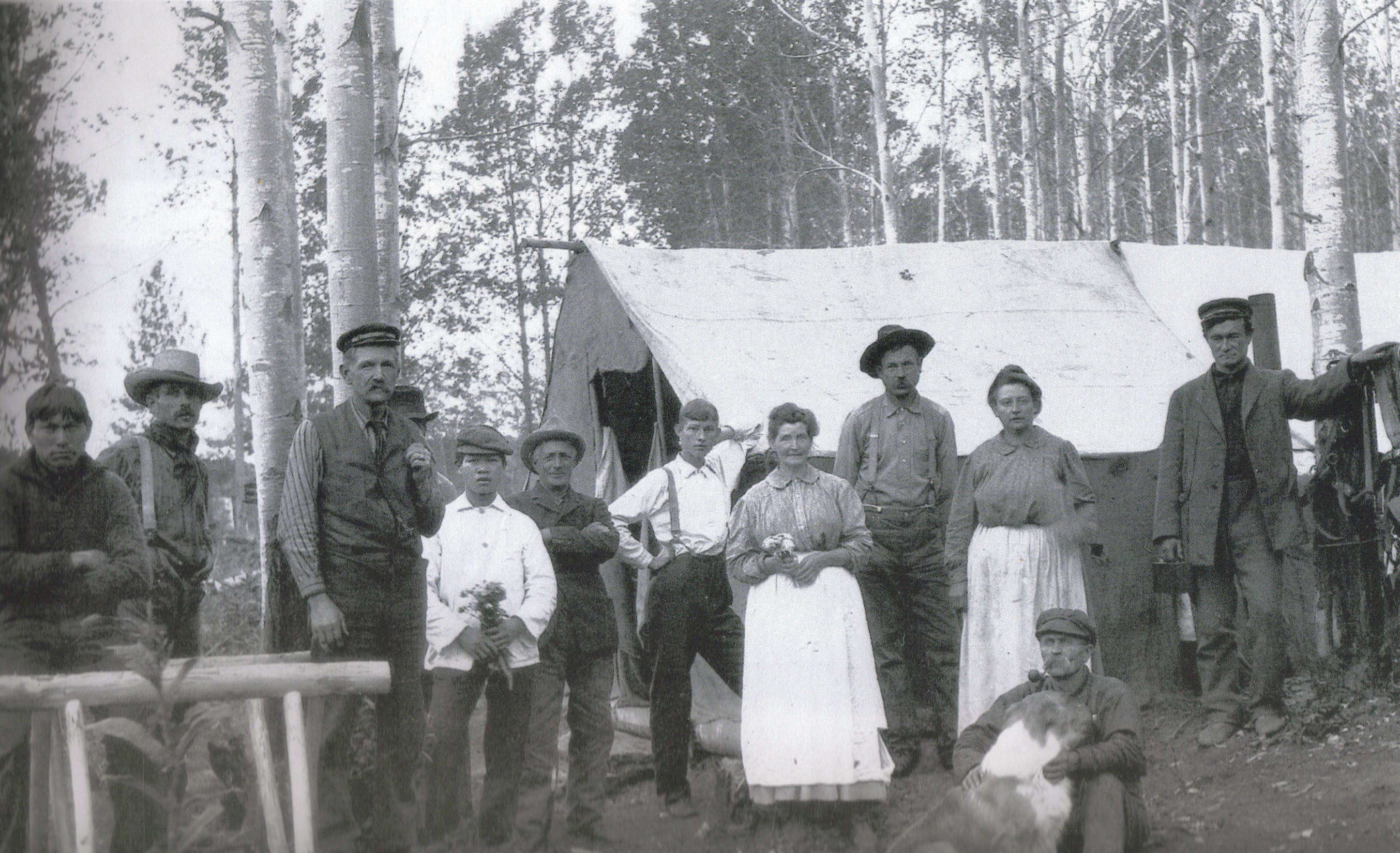
Captain John Bonser (third from left) near the Nechako River

The Fort George Lumber and Navigation Company then built the Fort Fraser in which Bonser pioneered the route to Tête Jaune Cache in 1910. Both sternwheelers would often be chartered by pioneer surveyor Frank Swannell who traveled on them to areas he was surveying in the Nechako Valley along the Stuart and Nechako rivers.

=== The Inlander ===
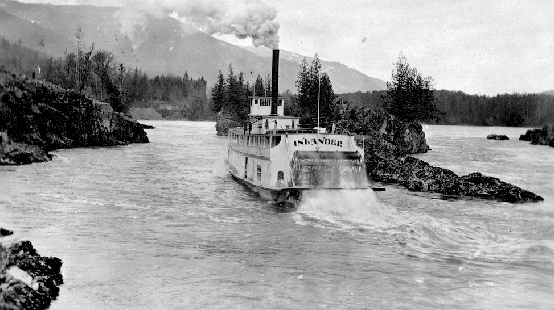
Inlander at Kitselas Canyon in 1911

John Bonser returned to the Skeena River in 1911 and piloted the Inlander for the 1911 and ‘12 seasons of navigation. Then, that August, the Grand Trunk Pacific Railway line was finished to form Prince Rupert to Hazelton, a death knell for the local sternwheelers. On September 13, 1912 the Inlander left Hazelton for the final time, the last of the sternwheelers on the Skeena River. When she reached Port Essington, the Inlander was pulled up onto ways and left to rot. Captain Bonser died just over a year later, on December 26, 1913 at Providence St. Vincent Medical Center in Portland. He was buried next to his son, Francisco, at the Deer Island Cemetery near Goble, Oregon.
