= BC Express =

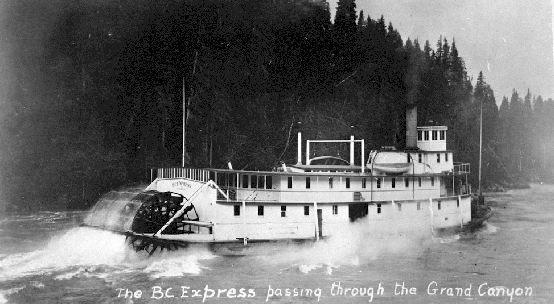
- BC Express at Grand Canyon of the Fraser 1914

History

Canada
- Name: BC Express
- Laid down: 1912 in Soda Creek
- Launched: June 24, 1912 at Soda Creek
- In service: 1912–1920
- Fate: Retired
- Notes: Captain Joseph Bucey

General characteristics
- Length: 121.3 feet (37 m)
- Beam: 27.9 feet (8.5 m)
- Notes: No.130883

The BC Express was a stern wheel paddle steamer (sternwheeler) that operated on the Fraser River in British Columbia, Canada, from 1912 to 1919. The BC Express was built for the BC Express Company by Alexander Watson Jr to work on the upper Fraser River between Tête Jaune Cache and Fort George during the busy years of Grand Trunk Pacific Railway construction. The BC Express Company hired Captain Joseph Bucey, an experienced Skeena River pilot, to be her master.

== The route ==
The upper Fraser River was navigable by sternwheeler between Soda Creek (start of navigation) and Tête Jaune Cache (head of navigation). From Soda Creek to Fort George there were two formidable obstacles, the Cottonwood Canyon and the Fort George Canyon. Between Fort George and Tête Jaune Cache, there were the Giscome Rapids, the Goat River Rapids and the fearsome Grand Canyon of the Fraser, which contained a powerful whirlpool. The Grand Trunk Pacific was being built from Winnipeg west and from Prince Rupert east. The two lines would meet on April 7, 1914, at Fort Fraser. Each end of construction was a portable town, which consisted of worker's accommodations, stores and even restaurants. These towns were referred to as the "end of steel". In 1912, the eastern end of construction would cross the Alberta BC border and by the spring of 1913 it would arrive at Tête Jaune Cache.

== Construction ==
The BC Express was the second sternwheeler built by the BC Express Company, the first one being the BX. Like the BX, the BC Express was also built at Soda Creek. And also like the BX, the BC Express's captain was involved in every stage of her planning and construction.

Construction began on the BC Express in March 1912 at Soda Creek, on the very site where the BX had been built. Although the BC Express, when completed, would look much like her sister ship (lacking only the covered paddlewheel), in actuality the two sternwheelers were very different. They were designed for different purposes on different section of the upper Fraser. Whereas the BX was designed to carry loads upstream from Soda Creek, the BC Express was designed to carry loads downstream from Tête Jaune Cache, which meant she would have to regularly navigate through the perilous Grand Canyon. With these facts in mind Alexander Watson and Joseph Bucey decided to build the BC Express six feet shorter and a foot narrower than the BX. Bucey also had Watson install a special "monkey rudder" on the BC Express's fantail, which would help him in maneuvering through the Grand Canyon.

== 1912 ==
The BC Express was launched on the 24th of June and Captain Bucey took her up to Fort George on the 29th. He was so impressed by how well she handled in the Cottonwood and Fort George canyons that he took her up to the Grand Canyon the following week, where she had no trouble at all steaming over its infamous and deadly whirlpool. She continued to make trips between the Grand Canyon and Fort George until that September when the water levels dropped so low that Bucey decided that the Giscome Rapids were too unsafe to navigate. In October the water levels rose again and she made several trips between Fort George and Soda Creek before the season ended.

== 1913 ==
1913 was the busiest year of navigation on the upper Fraser River because the end of steel for the eastern end of construction of the Grand Trunk Pacific had finally reached the head of navigation at Tête Jaune Cache. It was estimated that 3,500 workers were working on the grade between Tête Jaune Cache and Fort George and even more settlers and businessmen were moving into Fort George and the surrounding area. This had created a great surge of traffic over the Cariboo Road and the BC Express Company's stages and automobiles ran day and night to keep up with demand. Captain Bucey was not unaware of how busy and profitable the season would be. In anticipation of extending the BC Express's route all the way to Tête Jaune Cache, he rode the CPR to Edmonton, Alberta and then took the GTP to Tête Jaune Cache. From there he canoed downstream with a companion to Fort George, learning all he could about the upper reaches of the new route.

Captain Bucey took the BC Express to Tête Jaune Cache that May and returned with just twenty passengers and a small load of cargo. He wanted to see how the sternwheeler would run the Grand Canyon before he took her through with a capacity load. The trip was successful and the BC Express gained the title of the first loaded sternwheeler to ever run the Grand Canyon. Seeing this success, the railway's sternwheelers, the Operator and the Conveyor followed the very next day.

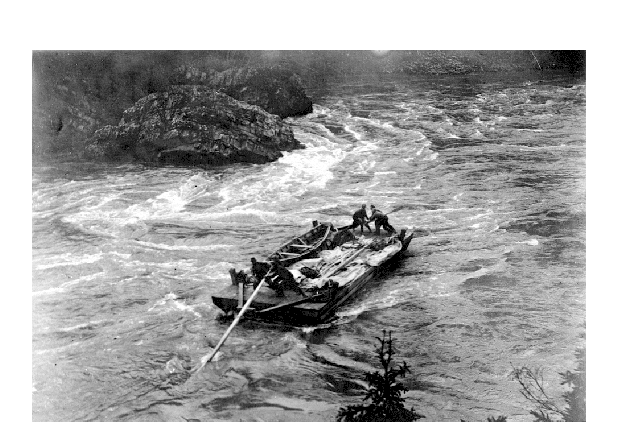
Scow at Grand Canyon

The BC Express began a weekly round trip service from Fort Gorge to Tête Jaune Cache, carrying capacity loads of freight and passengers. The passenger fare was $35, meals and berths extra, and the freight rate was $80 a ton. This latter seemed quite costly, until the shipper investigated the alternative shipping method, which was shipping his cargo by scow for $70 a ton, with no guarantee that the shipment would arrive intact, or at all. The risk to scows was mostly at the Grand Canyon, and the deadly whirlpool within it, which was responsible for the loss of at least eighty lives that summer alone, as well as the loss of approximately one in ten scows, and thousands of dollars of merchandise. Needless to say, the BC Express did a brisk business that season, often grossing $12,000 on a single trip. She was the only sternwheeler to offer freight and passenger service to the general public, as the Operator and Conveyor were strictly used for hauling their own workers and supplies needed for rail construction. The BC Express also had a very interesting season in 1913 and many stories of what occurred that summer were told and retold for years afterwards.

=== The railworkers who wouldn't pay ===
One afternoon in June, Bucey was returning from Tête Jaune Cache and had just passed the Grand Canyon when he spotted a white flag on the river bank. This was a sign that someone needed the sternwheeler to stop, either to take on cargo or passengers. The passengers turned out to be twenty burly railworkers with their paychecks in their pockets, all of whom were on their way to Fort George. In particular, South Fort George, where there was a licensed hotel, and a variety of other entertainments, where one could celebrate the end of another work week. However, when the purser approached the first of these men for his fare, the man obstinately refused to pay, even after the purser offered to cash his company paycheck. Fearing that if he let one get away without paying that none would pay, the purser went up to the pilot house and spoke to Captain Bucey. Bucey landed the BC Express again and went down to speak to the man himself. When the man unwisely repeated that he wasn't paying, Bucey called over two deckhands who, without ceremony, threw the man overboard into the river. Bucey calmly returned to the pilot house and steamed the BC Express back into the center of the river again. The ousted passenger, luckily a strong swimmer, had made it to shore, but his companions must not have fancied the idea of following him into the frigid and swift water, as they all paid their fares immediately.

=== The poker game ===
Later that summer, a well known gambler from the Skeena River was aboard, and he spoke to Captain Bucey about the possibility of having a poker game on one of the lower decks. The gambler promised it would not only occupy the players, but some spectators as well. Bucey was agreeable to the idea and gave his consent. Although gambling on sternwheelers that held liquor licenses was illegal, it was also a long and much-loved tradition. The game started off modestly enough, but soon huge sums were being wagered, and some large jackpots were being won. Present since the start of the game was a stranger, who was a provincial policeman who was being transferred to a new post by the constable at Fort George. Several hours into play, and when the table was covered with a drift of bills, this man abruptly announced his identity, declared the game illegal and confiscated all the money. The players and other spectators were outraged and immediately turned into an angry mob. The Skeena River gambler jumped to the policeman's defense and let the man return to his stateroom while he tried to mollify the angry men. After promising to refund any losses, the gambler went to speak to Captain Bucey to see what could be done about the matter. Bucey thought for a moment and then suggested to the gambler that he go talk to the policeman and suggest that if he let the game continue, he can keep half the money he took. The gambler did so, and was surprised when the policeman accepted the bribe. Upon hearing of the policeman's decision, Bucey had his first mate take over at the wheel, and accompanied by two deckhands, he went to the policeman's stateroom and took him down to the lower deck where the game had started again. Once there he told everyone how the policeman had tried to steal their money, but he assured everyone that he had complete control of his own ship, and that this incident would be reported to the magistrate at Fort George, and that the crooked policeman would be on the next steamer south. The bribe was surrendered, and the game continued unhampered. Captain Bucey had won the respect of his passengers, and their friendship.

=== The diamond salesman ===
One afternoon in August 1913, Captain Bucey was attempting to run the BC Express through the Grand Canyon when he realized that the current was particularly strong in the whirlpool. Bucey decided that it would be necessary to line the sternwheeler through the canyon, and was pulling over to the side when a 70-foot-long (21 m) spruce tree, complete with root structure, appeared on the surface of the whirlpool and swept under the BC Express, jamming against her three main rudders. Though Bucey had lost his main method of steering, he was still able to use the steamer's paddlewheel to maneuver backwards through the canyon, where he would eventually come to a place along the shore where he could tie up and his crew could disembark and remove the tree and check for damages. Most of his passengers, knowing Bucey's skillful reputation, were untroubled by the BC Express's plight, but one man panicked and raced across the bow and leapt onto the canyon wall, where he was left clinging 6 feet above the whirlpool. Unable to do anything for the passenger, Bucey had to continue downstream, where half an hour later he was able to tie up. After landing, Bucey's first thought was for his stranded passenger, and he sent out a rescue party of three men, led by AK Bouchier, the BC Express Company's agent at Tête Jaune Cache. The men walked back up the canyon and were relieved and astonished to find the man still clinging to the canyon wall, 70 feet below them. One of the rescuers was lowered down with a rope, and the passenger was hauled up to safety. The first thing the rescued man did was check his pockets for two small leather bags he was carrying, both full of diamond rings that he peddled along the new rail towns to brothels and private buyers. Once assured that his precious diamonds were safe, he was taken back to his berth on the BC Express and given a stiff scotch.

=== The low level bridge at Mile 141 ===
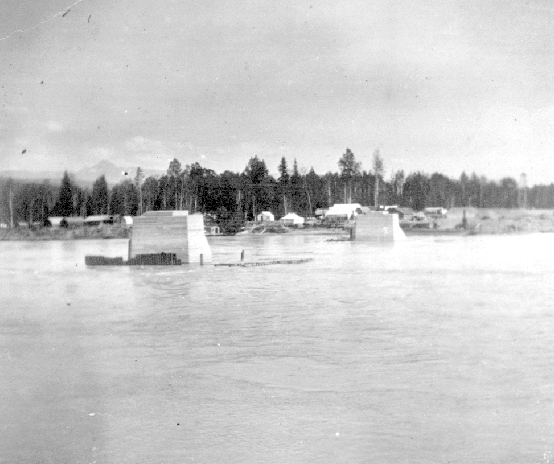
Low level bridge construction at Mile 141 (1913)

At the end of August 1913, Captain Bucey was taking the BC Express up from Fort George to Tête Jaune Cache when he encountered a cable strung across the river at Mile 141 where the railway would be building a bridge. Knowing that the railway had promised that they would not impede navigation on the upper Fraser River and that the bridge, once built, was going to be built with a lift span, Bucey stopped and asked that the cable be removed so he could pass. The bridge workers refused, and when Bucey reminded them of the railway's promise not to impede navigation, the workers informed Captain Bucey that they knew of no plans to build the bridge with a lift span and had been told that they were to protect the cable, "using force if necessary." Bucey was furious and threatened to use a shotgun on the workers, thus blasting his way through to Tête Jaune Cache. Cooler heads eventually prevailed, and Bucey turned the BC Express back towards Fort George. Once back in town, Bucey immediately wired the company's head office at Ashcroft and informed them of the obstruction. The BC Express Company had the Board of Railway Commissioners investigate the situation, and the Board came back in the company's favor and told the railway they must build the bridge at Mile 141 and the other at Bear River with lift spans as promised. The GTP refused the order, stating that if they changed the level of the bridges they'd have to change the level of the grade. The company took the railway to court for damages and loss of revenue, as they had been earning in excess of $5,000 a week on that route, but by the time the case was heard, World War I had begun, and the company's attorney was engaged in war work and was unable to appear. His replacement, a junior partner with little experience, was unable to prepare and present the evidence properly, and the company lost the case. Some historians have opined that the railway built these bridges to impede navigation out of spite and dislike for the BC Express Company because its owner at that time, Charles Vance Millar, had negotiated with the First Nation's people at Fort George to buy the land that the GTP wanted for their town-site.

The GTP got the land, but were forced to settle with Millar and sell him a section of the new town-site, which would later be called the Millar Addition.

== The end of an era ==
In 1915, only the BX was used on the upper Fraser River, with the BC Express reserved for special trips. In 1916 and 1917, sternwheelers were not used at all. In 1918, after an appeal from the Quesnel Board of Trade, the provincial government granted the BC Express Company a $10,000 per year subsidy to continue river navigation from Soda Creek to Fort George. The BX ran until August 30, 1919, when she was punctured by an infamous rock called the "Woodpecker" and sank with a 100 tons of bagged cement intended for construction of the Deep Creek Bridge.

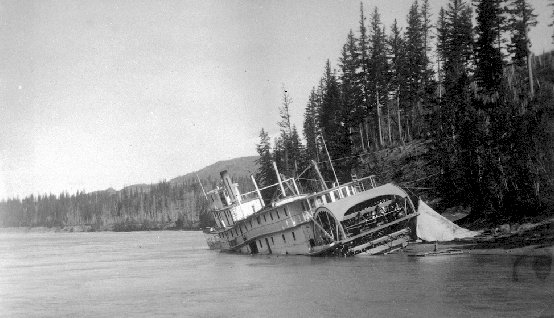
BX sunk at Woodpecker (1919)

The BC Express Company, fully intending to salvage their prized craft, hired Alexander Watson Jr to rush up from Victoria to overhaul the BC Express, which had been out of service since 1915, so she could go rescue the BX. However, out at the site of the accident, it was discovered that the bags of cement had solidified and had to be separated before the BX could be raised and the salvage could not be completed before freeze-up. In the spring of 1920, the salvage work was completed and the BX was raised and patched sufficiently to get her back to Fort George. The newly overhauled BC Express pushed her back upstream through the Fort George Canyon and to the shipyard at Fort George. This would be the first time in the history of sternwheelers that one would push another upriver through a canyon. That it could be accomplished was a fitting testament to the craftsmanship of Alexander Watson Jr and the skill of Captain Browne and Captain Bucey.

The BC Express ran until November 1920 and then it joined the BX on the riverbank at Fort George, where their hulls were abandoned. In a sense, they lived on, as their engines and equipment were shipped to Northern Alberta to work on the Mackenzie River for the Alberta and Arctic Transportation Company.

== See also ==
- Steamboats of the Upper Fraser River in British Columbia
- List of ships in British Columbia

== References and further reading ==
- West, Willis (1985). Stagecoach and Sternwheel Days in the Cariboo and Central BC. Heritage House. ISBN 0-919214-68-1.
- West, Willis (1949). BX and the Rush to Fort George. BC Historical Quarterly.
- Downs, Art (1971). Paddlewheels on the Frontier Volume 1. Foremost Publishing. ISBN 0-88826-033-4.
- Leonard, Frank (1996). A Thousand Blunders: The History of the Grand Trunk Pacific Railway in Northern British Columbia. UBC Press. ISBN 0-7748-0552-8.
