= Kleanza Creek Provincial Park =

Provincial park in British Columbia

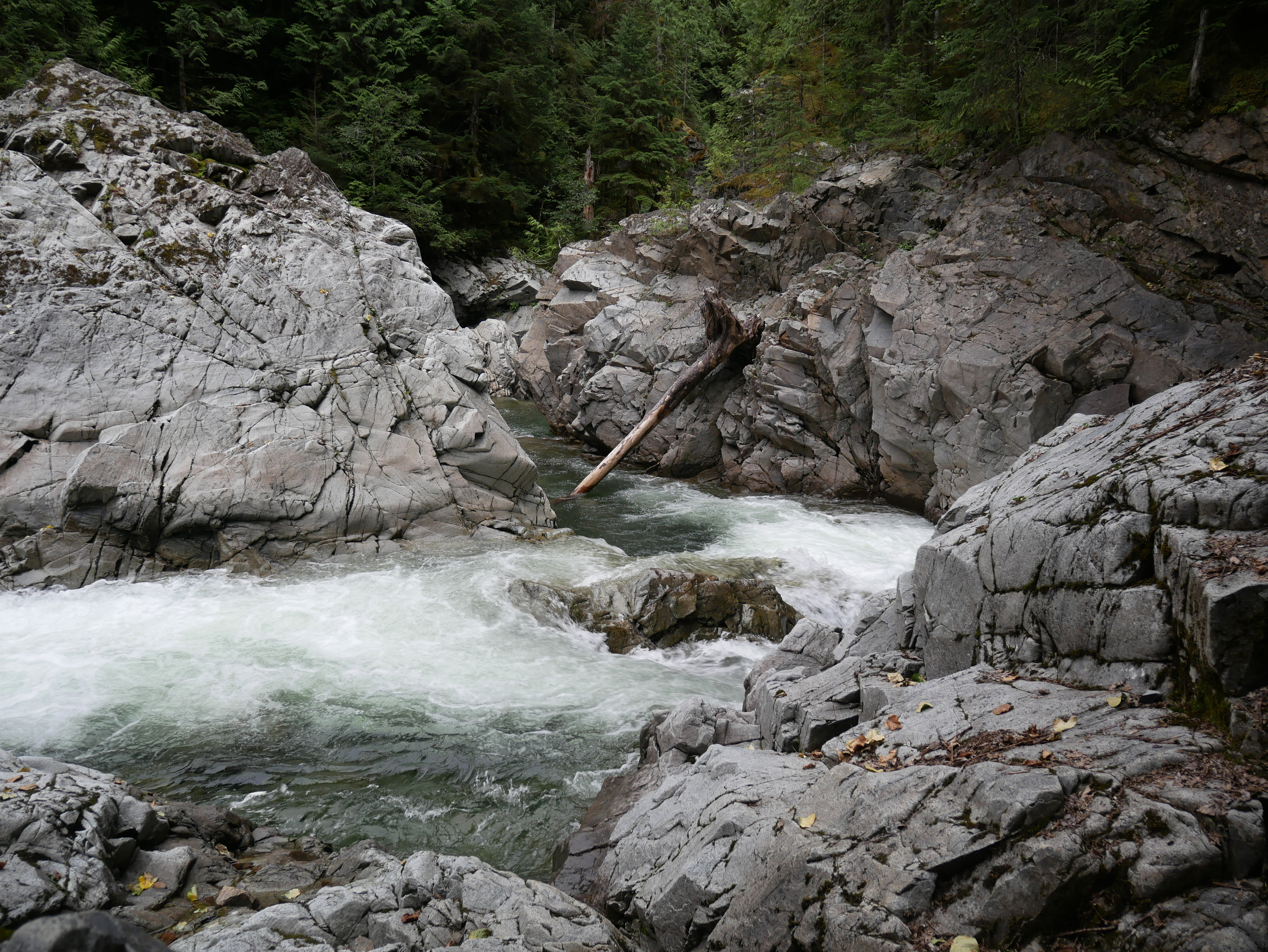
- Cascades in Kleanza Creek Provincial Park

- Location within British Columbia
- Interactive map of Kleanza Creek Provincial Park
- Location: Canada
- Nearest city: Terrace, British Columbia
- Coordinates: 54°35′55″N 128°23′45″W
- Area: 269 ha (660 acres)
- Established: 1956
- Operator: BC Parks

Kleanza Creek Provincial Park is a provincial park in British Columbia, Canada. Kleanza Creek is a tributary of the Skeena River. The park occupies over an area of 269 hectares (660 acres).

The Kleanza Creek Provincial Park is located in the Coast Mountains. The characteristic landscape of this area is dominated by forests and rock canyons. The park is an historically important area. The name 'Kleanza' is the Gitxsan word for gold. In the 1890s the creek saw its first mining for placer gold. Mining for gold on the river was abandoned because it was too deep and there was too much water in it. To this day, remains of old mines can be seen in the canyons.

== Conservation ==
Kleanza Creek Provincial Park provides protection to the Kleanza Creek Canyon and other crucial salmon spawning habitats,

== Wildlife ==
The creek is a major migratory waterway for the Pink salmon, which return to the creek during fall.
