= Sugarbowl-Grizzly Den Provincial Park and Protected Area =

Provincial park in British Columbia, Canada

Sugarbowl-Grizzly Den Provincial Park
- IUCN category II (national park)
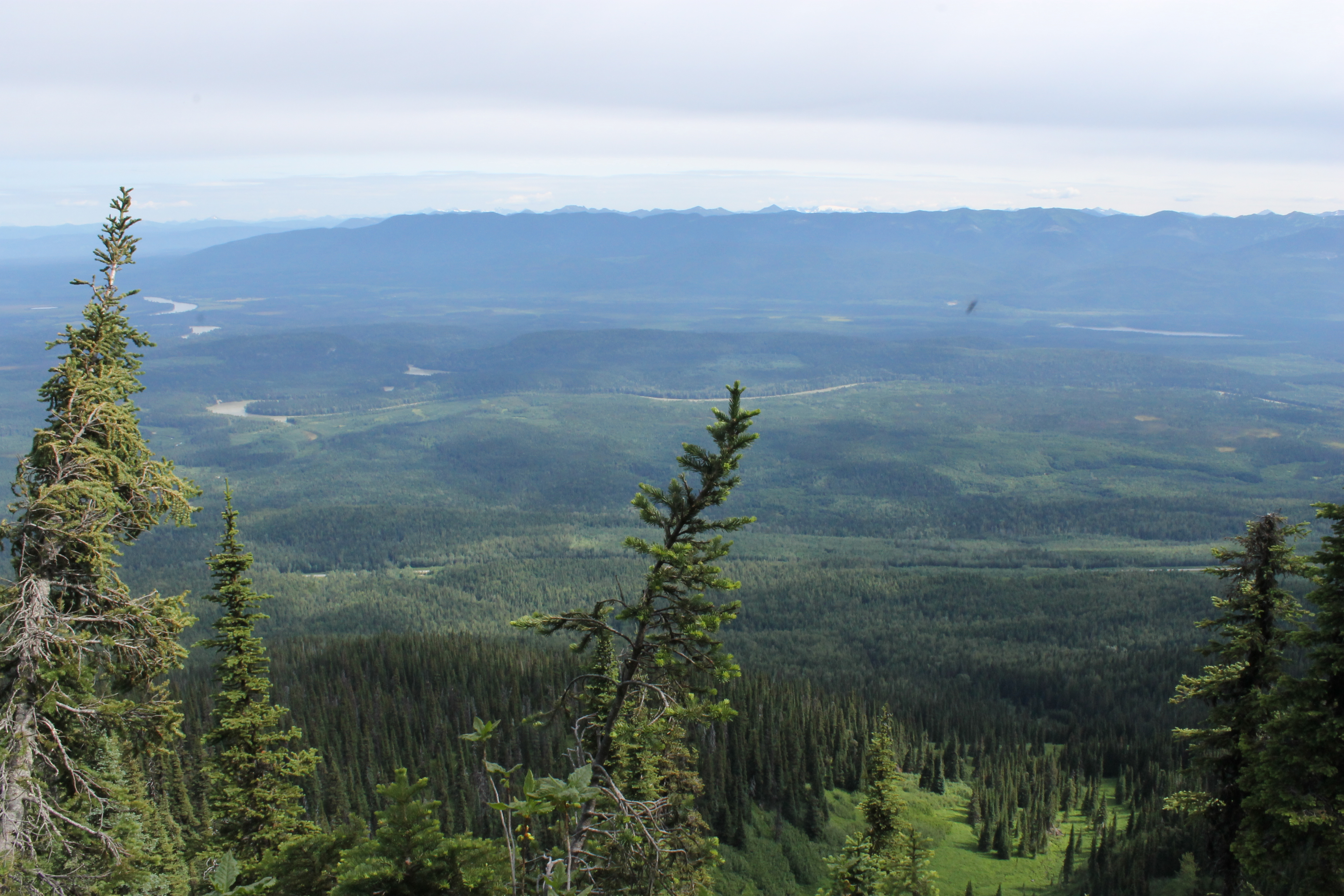
- Panoramic view

- Location within British Columbia
- Interactive map of Sugarbowl-Grizzly Den Provincial Park
- Location: British Columbia, Canada
- Nearest city: Prince George
- Coordinates: 53°50′39″N 121°36′04″W
- Area: 225.29 km^{2} (86.98 sq mi)
- Established: June 29, 2000
- Governing body: BC Parks

Sugarbowl-Grizzly Den Provincial Park and Protected Area is a provincial park in British Columbia, Canada.

== History ==
The park was established in 2000. In 1973 and 1974, Northwood Pulp and Timber Ltd. built the original trails and cabins (Raven Lake and Grizzly Den). The Ministry of Forests maintained the trails and cabins up until 2000.

== Geography ==
The park is 24,765 hectares in size. The Grand Canyon of the Fraser represents a unique feature which has historic significance related to the "Overlanders" journey to the Cariboo gold field in the 1860s and the construction of the Grand Trunk Pacific Railway.

The park is located 95 kilometres southeast of Prince George, British Columbia.

== Conservation ==
The park is a refuge for caribou and grizzly bears.

== Recreation ==
The following recreational activities are available: backcountry camping and hiking, cross-country skiing, snowshoeing, fishing and hunting. There are three cabins available in both summer and winter for the public's overnight use: 8 Mile log cabin; Raven Lake cabin and Grizzly Den cabin.

== See also ==
- List of British Columbia Provincial Parks
- List of Canadian provincial parks
