= Skeena (sternwheeler) =

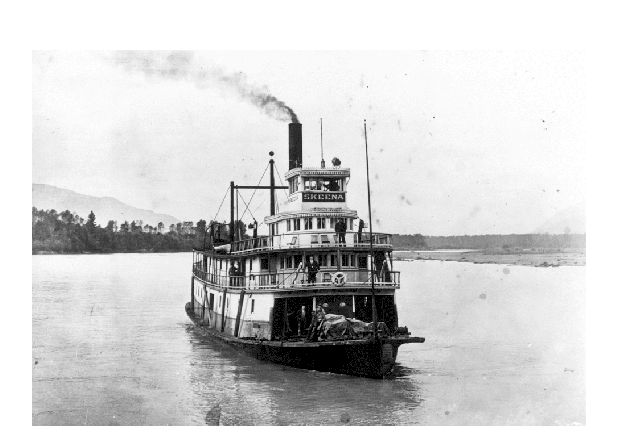
- GTP sternwheeler Skeena

History

Canada
- Name: Skeena
- Laid down: 1908 in Victoria, British Columbia
- Launched: 1909 on the Skeena River
- In service: 1909-1925
- Fate: Sold and converted to a barge in 1925
- Notes: Captain Magar 1909-1911 Charles Seymour 1914-1925

The Skeena sternwheeler was one of five sternwheelers built for the use on the Skeena River by Foley, Welch and Stewart for construction work on the Grand Trunk Pacific Railway from 1909 until 1911. She was built at Robertson's yard in Coal Harbour, Vancouver, in 1908. The other four were the Conveyor, the Operator, the Distributor and the Omineca. Three of these, the Conveyor, the Operator and the Distributor were built at Victoria, British Columbia in 1908 by Alexander Watson Jr.

== Skeena River ==
The Skeena began her work on the Skeena River in 1909 under the command of Captain Magar. She and the other four Foley, Welch and Stewart sternwheelers had their work cut out for them. The construction of the railway from Prince Rupert to Hazelton was one of the most difficult sections of track that would ever be laid in North America. This 186 mile stretch would take nearly four years to build and would employ thousands of workers. The Skeena was unique in that she was used primarily for delivering food supplies to the work camps along the river. In fact, she carried so much of meatpacker Pat Burns products that she was often mistakenly called his boat.

== Fraser River ==
In 1914, Captain Charles Seymour purchased the Skeena and took her down to the Fraser River. For eleven years the devotion of her skipper-owner kept her plying the river past Surrey, Coquitlam, Maple Ridge, Langley and Mission. But when Captain Seymour died in 1925 she lost her only advocate and was sold and converted to a floating barge for an oil company. Her departure ended the historic era of sternwheelers on the lower Fraser River.

== See also ==
- Steamboats of the Skeena River
- List of ships in British Columbia
