= The Inlander =

The Inlander may refer to:

- The Inlander, a sternwheeler that worked on the Skeena River in British Columbia, Canada from 1910 until 1912
- The Inlander (newspaper), a free weekly newspaper published in Spokane, Washington
- The Inlander (Queensland Rail) a passenger train in Queensland, Australia
