= Mount Royal (sternwheeler) =

Coordinates: 54.5508°N 128.4847°W

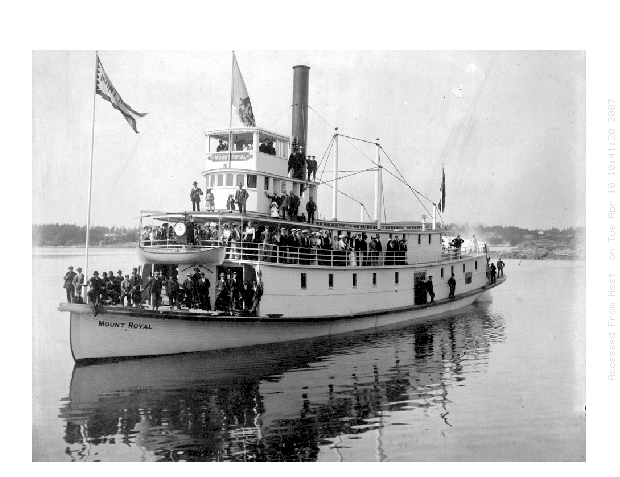
- HBC sternwheeler Mount Royal

History

Canada
- Name: Mount Royal
- Builder: Alexander Watson
- Laid down: 1901 in Victoria, British Columbia
- Launched: first attempt April 9, 1902 successfully launched several days later
- In service: 1902-1907
- Fate: Wrecked in Kitselas Canyon, six lives lost
- Notes: Captain SB Johnson

General characteristics
- Length: 138 ft (42.1 m)
- Beam: 28 ft (8.5 m)
- Draft: 18 inches empty 36 inches loaded
- Speed: 12 knots

Mount Royal was a sternwheeler that worked on the Skeena River and Stikine Rivers in British Columbia, Canada, from 1902 until 1907. She was named after Lord Strathcona who was also known as Donald Smith, 1st Baron Strathcona and Mount Royal.

Mount Royal was owned by the Hudson's Bay Company which also owned Caledonia and Strathcona. These sternwheelers were used to serve the communities along the river before and during the construction of the Grand Trunk Pacific Railway. During her six seasons of service, Mount Royal was piloted by Captain SB Johnson.

Mount Royal was built to run against Hazelton a privately owned sternwheeler that worked as a passenger and freight steamer for Robert Cunningham.

== Construction and launch ==
Mount Royal was built by Alexander Watson in Victoria at Albion Iron Works (VMD). Watson designed her specifically for navigating the treacherous Skeena River. Using fine Douglas fir and Eastern oak, he built one of the fastest, lightest and most luxurious sternwheelers that ever ran on the Skeena. Even with a full load of passengers and cargo, she only sat in 36 inches in the water.

On Mount Royal's launch date of April 9, 1902, she got hung up during the launch, and after two hours was freed, only to get caught up again, this time swinging into the bank. It would be several more days before she was successfully launched into the bay. A bad launch was considered to be an ill omen and, in this case, was one that would be fulfilled.

== Sternwheeler race on the Skeena ==
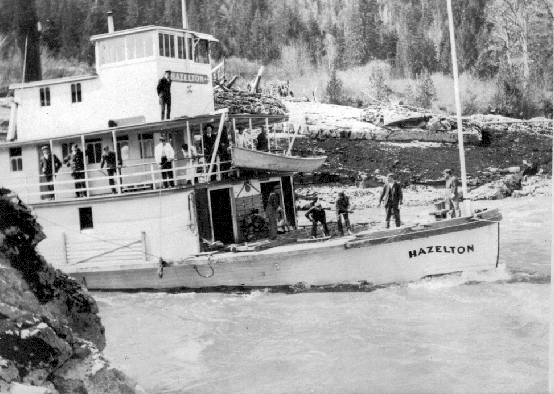
Hazelton at Kitselas Canyon

When Mount Royal arrived at the Skeena, rivalry flared between her and the Robert Cunningham's Hazelton almost immediately, with each captain trying to beat the other's times from Port Essington to Hazelton and back. The standing order from both companies was "beat the other boat." Inevitably, this led to a side-by-side race, an old but dangerous tradition among sternwheelers. In the spring of 1904, both boats wanted to be the first one of the season to arrive in Hazelton. Captain Bonser started out in Hazelton first, and while he was wooding-up 105 miles upstream, he saw Mount Royal with Johnson at the helm coming up from behind. Wooding-up was immediately ceased and Hazelton pulled into the stream as Mount Royal approached and they raced bow to bow. Slowly Mount Royal gained on Hazelton. Captain Bonser was having none of it and he rammed Mount Royal several times. Johnson lost control and the current carried her back downstream, bow first. Bonser wagged Hazelton's stern at Mount Royal, tooted the whistle and continued triumphantly upstream.7 Furious, Johnson left the pilothouse unattended to retrieve a rifle and shot at the departing Hazelton. Afterwards, Johnson laid charges on Bonser claiming he deliberately rammed Mount Royal. Bonser claimed in his defense that it was an accident. The Federal Department of Marine investigated and decided that both captains were at fault, Bonser for ramming Mount Royal, and Johnson for leaving the helm. The men were reprimanded and the case was closed.

The HBC and Robert Cunningham came to a mutual decision that the rivalry was not profitable and an agreement was reached to end it. The HBC paid Robert Cunningham $2,500 to tie up his vessel, and they hauled his freight for free. Later, the HBC bought Hazelton.

== The wreck of Mount Royal ==
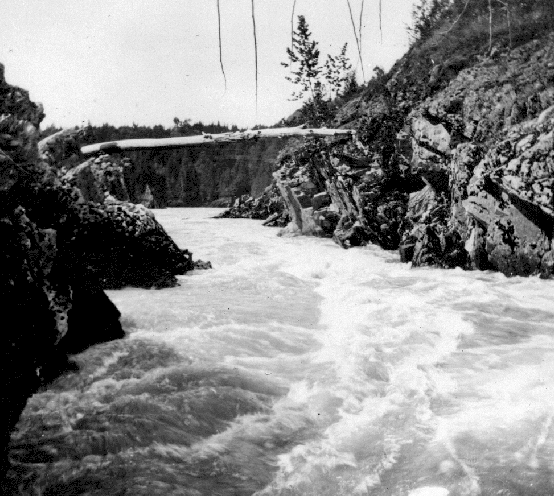
Kitselas Canyon

In 1907, Captain Johnson was still in charge of Mount Royal. On the afternoon of July 6, he was returning from Hazelton and was steaming through the Kitselas Canyon, when disaster struck. A strong wind pushed her into a large rock formation named Ringbolt Island, wedging her crosswise against the current. Luckily, she held while the passengers and crew scrambled to safety on the shore. Johnson assessed the situation and decided that Mount Royal could be saved and with ten crewmen, he returned aboard. He had decided that the best way to deal with this problem was to use the capstan to winch the sternwheeler back over Ringbolt Island. This proved to be a disastrous decision. The king post broke and rammed through the bottom of Mount Royal and she buckled as the current washed over her, then she rolled upside down and broke into pieces. Although Johnson survived, six of the crewmen drowned, including the first officer. One of the four survivors was rescued by George Little, who would later become the founder of the town of Terrace. George and a companion spotted the wrecked hull as the wreckage floated past the community of Kitselas. Curious, they paddled out to it and saw a hand waving at them from a hole in hull. The survivor was Mount Royal's chief engineer, Ben Maddigan, who was trapped in the bilge and filthy, but unhurt. After George Little chopped him out, Little commented that there must have been some air down there. The exhausted engineer replied, "I don’t know about air, but there was one hell of a lot of water!"

There was a strongbox aboard Mount Royal when she sank, and the strongbox contained an undisclosed amount of money. The strongbox was never recovered. An estimate of the amount in the strongbox is about $700. The box contained both paper and coin. It has also been stated that there was a large shipment of gold-dust from either the Omineca Country or Lorne Creek on board. The gold dust theory may be a fabrication. Many ill-equipped attempts have been made to recover the strongbox, but all have failed.

== See also ==
- Steamboats of the Skeena River
- List of historical ships in British Columbia
