= Operator (sternwheeler) =

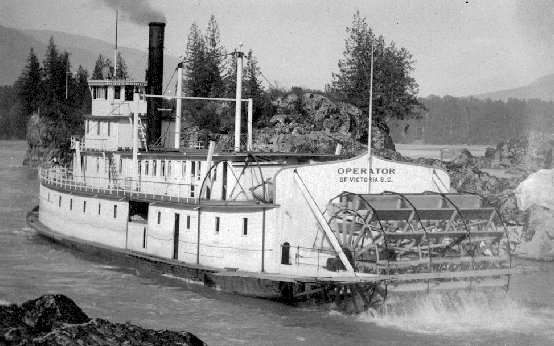
- Operator on Skeena River in 1911

History

Canada
- Name: Operator
- Laid down: 1908 in Victoria for Skeena River
- Launched: 1909 on Skeena River May 12, 1912 on Fraser River
- In service: 1909–1914
- Reinstated: Rebuilt in 1911 at Tête Jaune Cache for Fraser River
- Fate: Retired in 1914
- Notes: Captain "Con" Myers

General characteristics
- Length: 141.7 ft (43.2 m)
- Beam: 34.8 ft (10.6 m)
- Notes: No.130886

The Operator sternwheeler was one of five sternwheelers built for the use on the Skeena River by Foley, Welch and Stewart for construction work on the Grand Trunk Pacific Railway. The other four were the Conveyor, the Skeena, the Distributor and the Omineca. Three of these, the Conveyor, the Operator and the Distributor were built at Victoria, British Columbia, in 1908 by Alexander Watson Jr.

== Skeena River ==
The Operator began her work on the Skeena River in 1909 under the command of Captain "Con" Myers. She and the other four Foley, Welch and Stewart sternwheelers had their work cut out for them. The construction of the railway from Prince Rupert to Hazelton was one of the most difficult sections of track that would ever be laid in North America. This 186-mile stretch would take nearly four years to build and would employ thousands of workers.

At the end of the season of navigation in 1911, the Operator and her sister ship Conveyor were finished on the Skeena, but would continue to work on the Grand Trunk Pacific from the other end of construction on the upper Fraser River.

== Fraser River ==
The Operator and the Conveyor were both taken down to Victoria and dismantled and their machinery and equipment was put in boxcars and shipped by rail to Jasper, Alberta, and then to the end of steel at the eastern end of construction. Because the tracks hadn't reached the head of navigation yet, the boilers and other equipment had to be hauled by mule wagon the last 25 miles to the shipyard at Tête Jaune Cache. It was a difficult and dangerous operation, taking a full week, and one construction worker was killed. At Tête Jaune Cache, the machinery was put into new hulls and the two new ships were once again named Operator and Conveyor and both were put back under the command of their old captains. Both were launched on at Tête Jaune Cache on May 12, 1912.

The Operator was a large and powerful steamer, capable of carrying 200 passengers, 200 tons of freight, and could also handle a 100-ton barge. In 1912, the Operator and the Conveyor began work on the upper Fraser but were confined to the area around Tête Jaune Cache as it was a season of very low water and river navigation for these large sternwheelers was nearly impossible. The Operator and the Conveyor worked regularly during the season of 1913 and then were berthed for the winter at Mile 142 on the downriver side of a new low-level bridge that had just been built, which had cut off navigation for sternwheelers to go further upriver. This bridge had come as an unpleasant surprise to the BC Express Company, which had been promised that the bridges along the upper Fraser would be built with lift-spans to allow sternwheelers access to travel underneath them. However, the low-level bridge made no difference to the two Foley, Welch and Stewart boats, who were finished on this section of the upper Fraser.

In 1914, their next task would be to work on the construction for the Pacific Great Eastern Railway which was being built from Fort George south. Their new route would take them from Fort George to Soda Creek. The Operator and the Conveyor worked this route from May to August 1914, serving the new work camps and hauling supplies and equipment for rail construction.

However, that August would bring the onset of the Great War and the halting of construction of the Pacific Great Eastern. The Conveyor and the Operator both ceased work immediately and were hauled out of the river and left to rot at Foley's Cache at Fort George.

== See also ==
- Steamboats of the Upper Fraser River in British Columbia
- List of ships in British Columbia
