= Foley, Welch and Stewart =

American-Canadian railroad construction partnership

Foley, Welch and Stewart was an early 20th-century American-Canadian railroad construction partnership.

== Earlier lumber and construction involvement ==
In 1897, Peter Larson, Patrick Welch, John (Jack) William Stewart, and the Foley Brothers formed an earthmoving alliance which performed grading during railroad construction.

=== Peter Larson ===
In 1868, Larson arrived in New Orleans from Funen, Denmark, almost penniless. Working northwestward, he obtained grading subcontracts on the Northern Pacific Railway construction throughout the 1870s and early 1880s. Starting with a single scraper pulled by six mules, he greatly expanded his business. He settled in Billings, Montana, which became his headquarters. In 1898, Julius Bloedel and John Joseph Donovan partnered with him in establishing the Lake Whatcom Logging Co.

In 1905, the Grand Trunk Pacific Railway (GTP) began building westward from Fort William, Ontario. Anticipating that Prince Rupert, British Columbia, would become the terminus, Larson and Ed J. Matthews secured options on most of this land. Rather than immediately profit, Larson sold the options to the GTP at cost, looking to the longer term relationship. In due course, the partners of Foley, Welch and Stewart received the contracts to build the Edmonton–Prince Rupert leg of the GTP.

=== J.W. Stewart ===
In 1882, Stewart arrived in Canada from Sutherland, Scotland, with limited means. Working westward, he reached Vancouver in 1885, where he felled trees during the layout of the Canadian Pacific Railway (CP) townsite. In the 1886 Great Vancouver Fire, he stood for hours in False Creek to escape the inferno. After 1887, he moved to Montana Territory and worked for Peter Larson.

In 1911, Bloedel, Stewart and Welch (BS&W) was established for lumber operations on Vancouver Island.

=== Foley Brothers ===
In 1830, the Foley family settled in Lanark, Upper Canada. Timothy and his three younger brothers became loggers. In the early 1870s, the brothers established a logging and sawmill operation in Benton County, Minnesota, which provided lumber for the westward extension of the Great Northern Railway (GN). Logging was in winter and railroad earthmoving in summer. In 1882, they were involved in constructing the Winnipeg–Calgary leg of the CP. In 1898, the Mann, Foley & Larson partnership built the Castlegar–Midway leg of the Columbia and Western Railway (C&W) for CP. In 1906, Foley, Locke & Larson undertook reconstruction for CP east of Winnipeg. That year, Foley, Larson & Co was awarded the 832-kilometre (517 mi) Saskatoon–Edmonton leg of the GTP westward extension.

Not only did the partnership handle construction equipment and supplies, but also groceries. To this end, the wholesale grocery firm of Foley, Lock & Larson was established in 1903. Usually, the agreements with subcontractors compelled the latter to buy all supplies from the partnership.

=== Patrick Welch ===
In 1888, Welch arrived in Helena, Montana, from New York (state). Establishing his headquarters, he oversaw the construction of the Montana Central Railway. In 1896, he relocated to Spokane, Washington, where he associated with the Foley Bros and Stewart on the GN westward extension.

In May 1904, the P. Welch & Co and J.W. Stewart & Co partnership was awarded the Grand Forks–Phoenix branch line of the Vancouver, Victoria and Eastern Railway (VV&E), owned by GN.

In July 1905, P. Welch & Co was awarded the Midway–Myncaster extension of the VV&E.

In August 1905, a joint venture between P. Welch & Co and Porter Bros was awarded the Molson–Oroville extension of the VV&E. That month, P. Welch & Co was awarded 48 kilometres (30 mi) of rock work on the Alaska Central Railroad.

During 1905–1907, a joint venture between P. Welch & Co and Porter Bros undertook $8 million of work on the GN Portland–Seattle line.

In 1907, P. Welch & Co was awarded the Keremeos–Hedley extension of the VV&E in BC.

== Main construction partnership ==
=== Early expansion ===
Whereas Larson had married Margaret Moran, her sisters Susan and Elizabeth had married Welch and Stewart respectively. In 1907, John and Thomas Foley and Peter Larson died. The new partnership name became Foley Bros, Welch & Stewart or Foley, Welch & Stewart (FW&S), but it was not uncommon for projects to operate under the names of the individual partners.

In March 1908, Foley Bros was awarded the Superior Junction–Fort William, Ontario leg of the GTP.

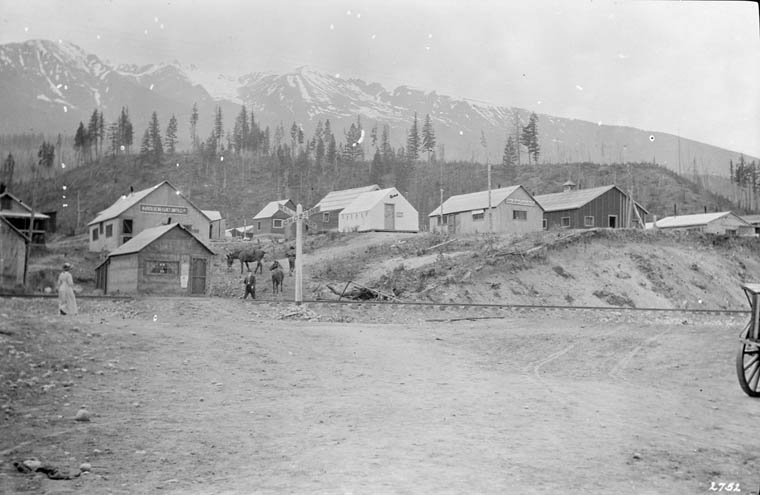
Northeastward view of rebuilt FW&S camp in Tête Jaune Cache vicinity, 1913 (immediately northwest of present Old Tête Jaune Cache Rd bridge over Tête Creek).

In May 1908, Foley Bros was awarded the rock work on the double-tracking of the Fort William–Winnipeg leg of the CP.

In May 1908, FW&S commenced work on the 1,400-kilometre (900 mi) Edmonton–Prince Rupert leg of the GTP from both ends. Subcontractors were allocated sections of less than 8 kilometres (5 mi) each but some undertook multiple sections. The project was completed in April 1914.

In February 1909, after another subcontractor had failed, the GTP subcontracted FW&S to complete 240 kilometres (150 mi) eastward from a point 13 kilometres (8 mi) west of the Abitibi River crossing (Cochrane, Ontario) for the National Transcontinental Railway.

In 1910, J.W. Stewart & Co was awarded the Princeton–Coalmont and Abbotsford–Hope legs of the VV&E within BC. In May 1913, the eastward advance of the Canadian Northern Railway (CNoR) rail head reached Hope. When the VV&E track reached Cannor in September 1916, the junction with the CNoR, GN acquired running rights on the Cannor–Hope leg. Consequently, the FW&S contract was substantially reduced.

In the early 1910s, FW&S was the largest railway contracting firm in the west with 50,000 workers and 3,200 kilometres (2,000 mi) of railway under construction.

In July 1911, P. Welch & Co was awarded the 887-kilometre (551 mi) Port Arthur–Sudbury leg of the CNoR in Ontario. That month, a joint venture between P. Welch & Co and Northern Construction (NorCon) was awarded the 262-kilometre (163 mi) Hope–Kamloops leg of the CNoR in BC. Northern Construction was the contracting name of partners Mackenzie and Mann.

=== PGE ramifications ===
In February 1912, the province entered an understanding with FW&S to build, own, and operate, a Vancouver–Fort George line. By this time, Timothy Foley was in his 70s, so the day-to-day management rested with Welch and Stewart, who were in their 50s. That month, the Conservative administration of Premier Richard McBride introduced legislation for the Pacific Great Eastern Railway (PGE) to create a new 740-kilometre (460 mi) railway (later corrected to 770-kilometre (480 mi)).

Financially supported but not owned by government, the PGE model defied business logic. The railway was authorized to issue 4 per cent interest bonds to a total value of $35,000 per mile of the projected mileage, upon which the government guaranteed the principal and interest.

In September 1912, P. Welch & Co was awarded the construction contract. Stewart took extended medical leave August 1912–August 1913, an extremely busy period for FW&S, when Welch divided his supervisory time between multiple major projects.

McBride allowed the PGE and FW&S to be controlled by the same parties, which removed any incentive to build as quickly and economically as possible. The former sacrificed value for money, while the latter profiteered. In fact, the PGE was only partially completed before becoming insolvent, while FW&S made a 38 per cent profit on $16,475,630 billed. The FW&S profits from land sales were handled separately.

Since both the PGE promoters and government suspected up front that the bond funding would be insufficient for the project, McBride had allegedly promised to provide additional aid to complete the project if this proved the case. Although construction began in October 1912, the first cost estimate was not prepared until late 1913, which revealed a $10 million projected funding shortfall.

To attract investors in 1913, the interest rate on new bond issues increased to 4 1/2 per cent. Although legally, the bond money should only have been dispensed in proportion to the work completed, the release of funds was far in excess. In February 1914, the government raised the bond issue limit from $35,000 to $42,000 per mile. The announcement of an extension into the Peace Country was intended to soften the news of huge cost over-runs to date.

Welch underwent a major operation and took medical leave November 1913–November 1915, while Stewart shouldered the daily responsibilities.

Rather than reducing or suspending operations, which could have preserved almost 70 per cent of the bond money, the government continued releasing funds. When the bond money was exhausted in November 1915, the line was only 35 per cent complete, the PGE was insolvent, and as guarantor of principal and interest on the bonds, the BC Government faced a debt burden. Squamish and Clinton became the terminals of the 264-kilometre (164 mi) line.

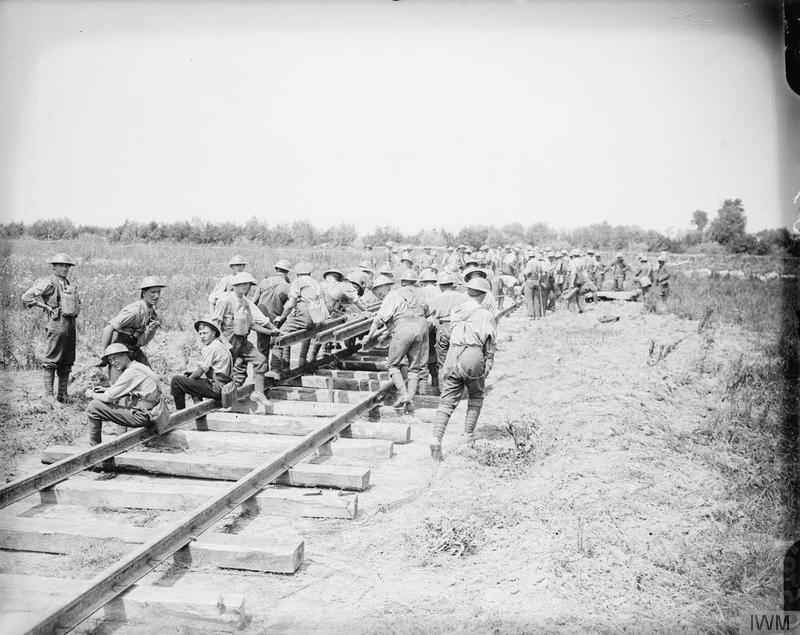
Battle of Passchendaele, laying a light railway line near Boesinghe, 1917

Stewart left for overseas service in August 1916. During World War I, he was promoted to brigadier general in order to direct railway construction in France. His skills in the rapid construction of track elevated him to command all British and Canadian rail units.

Later audits and enquiries revealed that the PGE Act, which usurped the basic checks and balances of the Railway Act, was itself laxly followed by the government, resulting in an overpayment of more than $5.7 million to FW&S.

In late 1917, limited grading having ceased, FW&S proposed a government takeover of the PGE. To avoid lengthy and expensive legal proceedings, FW&S agreed in February 1918 to hand over PGE assets and a cash payment of $750,000. Although released from all obligations and the dropping of government litigation, FW&S was allowed to retain ownership of the PGE Land Development Company. The degree to which financial assets had been transferred to this company since 1912 was never revealed. Although Welch had promised at the hearings to provide information on land sale profits, he instead relocated to Seattle with the corporate records.

The PGE insolvency had forced the BC government to assume the ownership and debt of the railway. As second premier of the following Liberal administration, John Oliver engaged NorCon to extend the line northward to Quesnel. A subsequent royal commission found many similar abuses by Norcon to those of FW&S. When Norcon took away equipment estimated at up to $1 million, the government stated it belonged to FW&S and not the PGE. Assumedly, Norcon directly compensated FW&S.

=== Concurrent projects ===
In August 1912, P. Welch & Co was awarded the Coalmont–Brookmere extension of the VV&E in BC.

In September 1912, FW&S was awarded the Victoria–Port Alberni leg of the CNoR in BC.

In January 1913, a joint venture between FW&S and Edward Peterson was awarded the Weyburn–Lethbridge branch of the CP in Saskatchewan.

In July 1913, FW&S was awarded the CP Connaught Tunnel construction and connecting trackage by offering the lowest bid and earliest completion projection. The 8-kilometre (5 mi) tunnel opened in December 1916.

In November 1913, FW&S was awarded the new harbour and terminal works at Halifax, Nova Scotia. Carried out as a joint venture with Fauquier, Welch supervised the project. Following the 1917 Halifax Explosion, the project was suspended, and the military expropriated the floating cranes for priority needs.

== After World War I ==
After 1917, Welch largely retired, but he associated with Stewart in the Calgary office of Stewart & Welch and with Bloedel in BS&W.

In 1919, Timothy Foley died and Welch was in poor health. During this period, Stewart primarily operated as sole proprietor on a series of smaller railway upgrade projects.

In 1921, Stewart joined A.R. Mann at NorCon, which became known as Northern Construction Co & J.W. Stewart. That year, Stewart and MacDonnell Ltd was established in the UK for the $17 million upgrade of harbour and railway infrastructure at Takoradi in the Gold Coast (later renamed Ghana). Experiencing delays before and after site work commenced in 1923, the company was replaced in September 1924 by Sir Robert McAlpine Ltd, which completed the contract.

In Canada, the Norcon association was awarded the Ballantyne Pier superstructure in 1921, the Second Narrows Bridge in 1923, and the Dunsmuir Tunnel and Downtown Vancouver Canadian National Steamship pier in 1931.

In 1929, Welch died. During his funeral, construction workers on various projects throughout the world paused for an hour. That year, a former worker on the PGE project, who held Stewart at gunpoint demanding an $18,000 payment for an injury claim, was subsequently arrested for attempted robbery and carrying a concealed weapon.

Stewart died in 1938. His funeral was attended by dignitaries from across Canada and farther afield. His coffin was carried upon a gun carriage through Downtown Vancouver.

== Honours ==
In 1917, Stewart and Welch opened the Lucky Four Copper Mine. Mine superintendent Arthur Williamson named the nearby peaks as Mount Foley, Mount Welch, and Mount Stewart. Becoming established names in the mountaineering community, Foley Peak, Welch Peak, and Stewart Peak were officially adopted in 1946. In the 1910s, FW&S had undertaken railway construction both to the east and west along the Fraser River. The names of Foley Glacier, Foley Creek, and Foley Lake, derived from the mountain.
