= Skeena River =

River in British Columbia, Canada

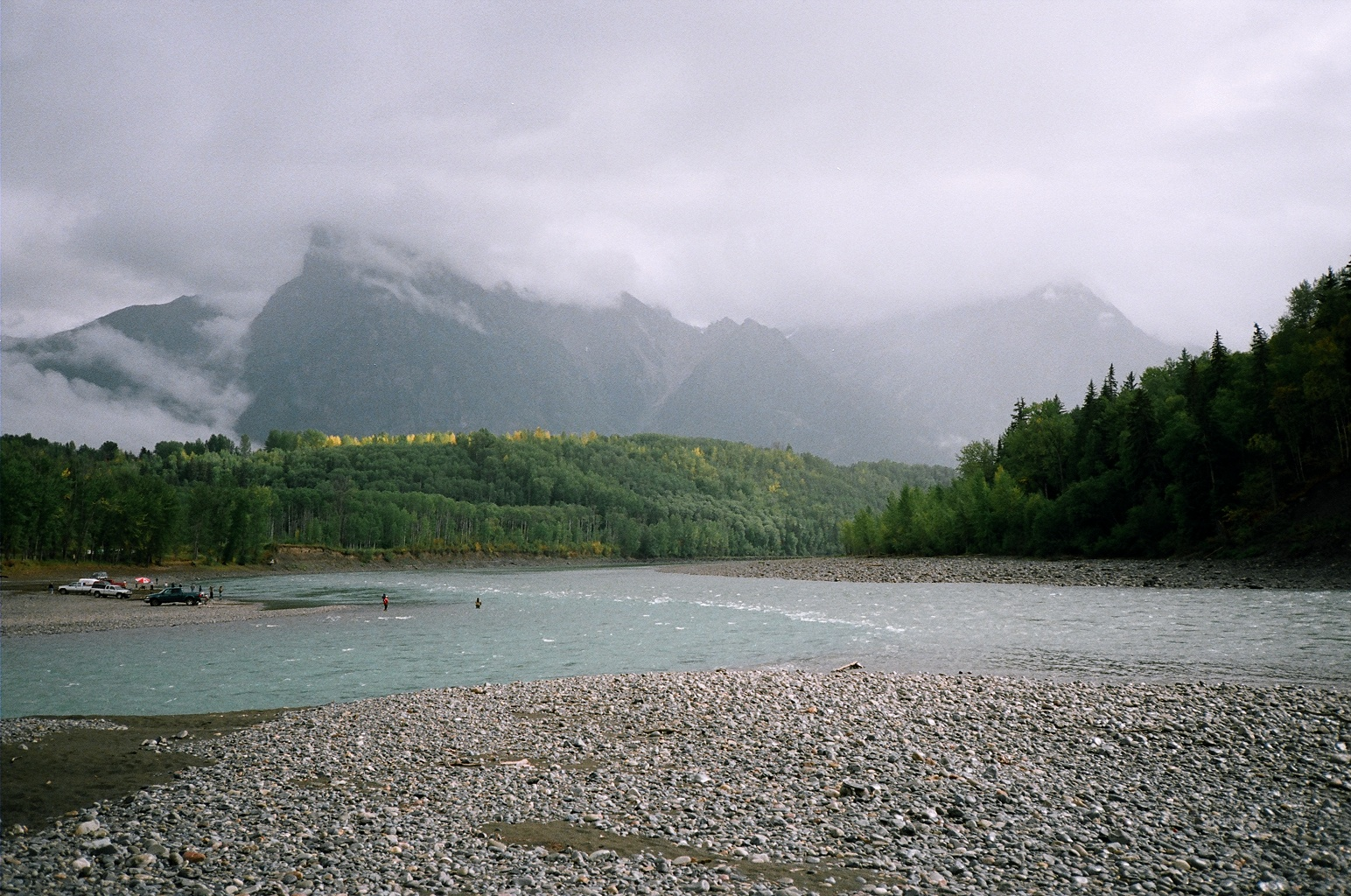
- The Bulkley River (left) flowing into the Skeena River (right) near Hazelton

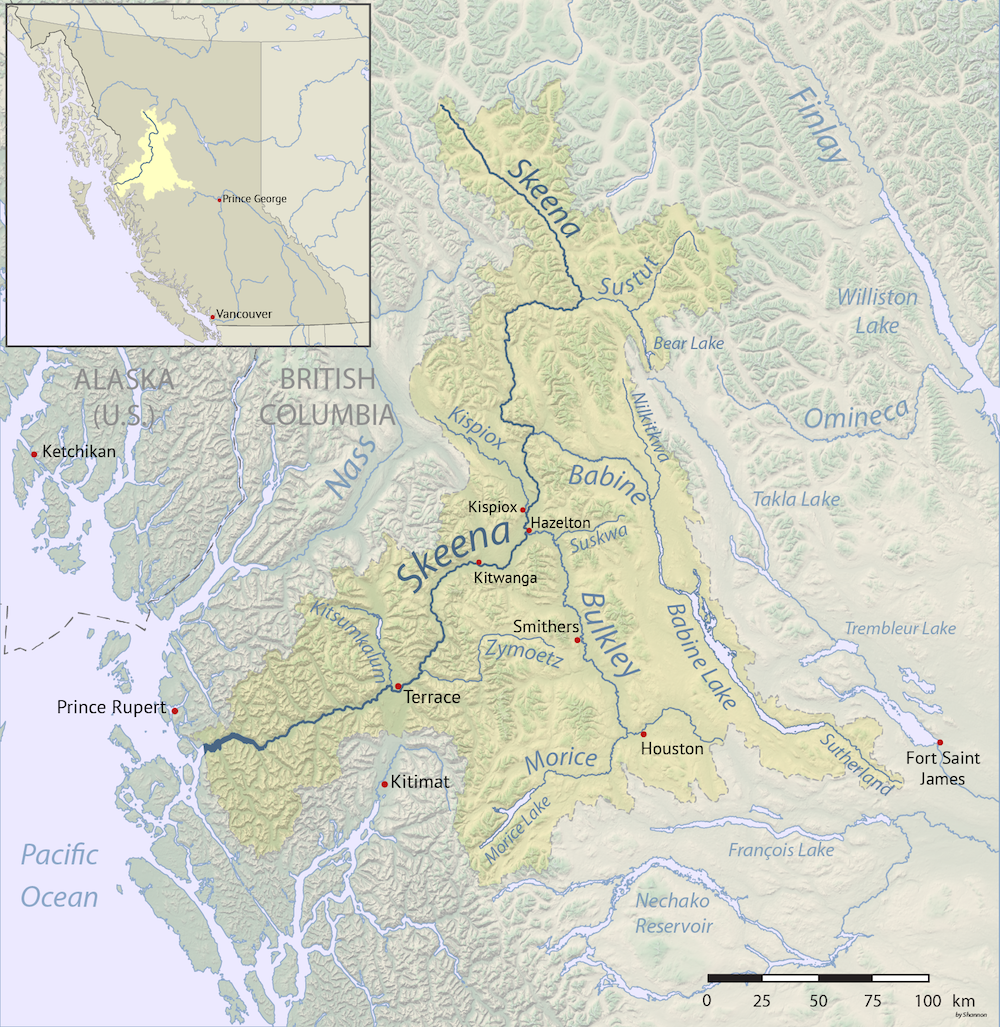
- Skeena River watershed with tributaries

Location
- Country: Canada
- Province: British Columbia
- City: Terrace

Physical characteristics
- Source: Spatsizi Plateau
  - coordinates: 57°9′6″N 128°41′29″W
- Mouth: Pacific Ocean
  - location: Chatham Sound
  - coordinates: 54°8′15″N 130°5′40″W
  - elevation: 0 m (0 ft)
- Length: 570 km (350 mi)
- Basin size: 54,400 km^{2} (21,000 sq mi)
- Discharge
  - location: mouth
  - average: 1,760 m^{3}/s (62,000 cu ft/s)

Basin features
- Tributaries
  - left: Sustut River, Babine River, Bulkley River, Zymoetz River
  - right: Kitwanga River, Lorne Creek, Kitsumkalum River

The Skeena River is the second-longest river entirely within British Columbia, Canada (after the Fraser River). Since ancient times, the Skeena has been an important transportation artery, particularly for the Tsimshian and the Gitxsan—whose names mean "inside the River of Mist", and "people of the River of Mist", respectively. The river and its basin sustain a wide variety of fish, wildlife, and vegetation, and communities native to the area depend on the health of the river. The Tsimshian migrated to the Lower Skeena River, and the Gitxsan occupy territory of the Upper Skeena.

During the Omineca Gold Rush, steamboat services ran from the sea to Hazelton, which was the jumping-off point for the trails to the goldfields. The Hudson's Bay Company established a major trading post north of the Skeena at what became called Port Simpson, British Columbia (Lax Kw'alaams), where nine tribes of the Tsimshian nation settled about 1834. Other tribes live elsewhere in BC, and descendants of one group in Metlakatla, Alaska.

== Geography ==
The Skeena originates south of the Spatsizi Plateau Wilderness Provincial Park in north western British Columbia, forming a divide with the Klappan River, a tributary of the Stikine River. It flows for 570 kilometres (350 miles) before it empties into Chatham Sound, Telegraph Passage and Ogden Channel, east of the Dixon Entrance, all part of the Pacific Ocean. The Skeena drains 54,400 square kilometres (21,000 square miles) of land with a mean annual discharge of 1,760 cubic metres per second (62,000 cu ft/s).

=== Course ===
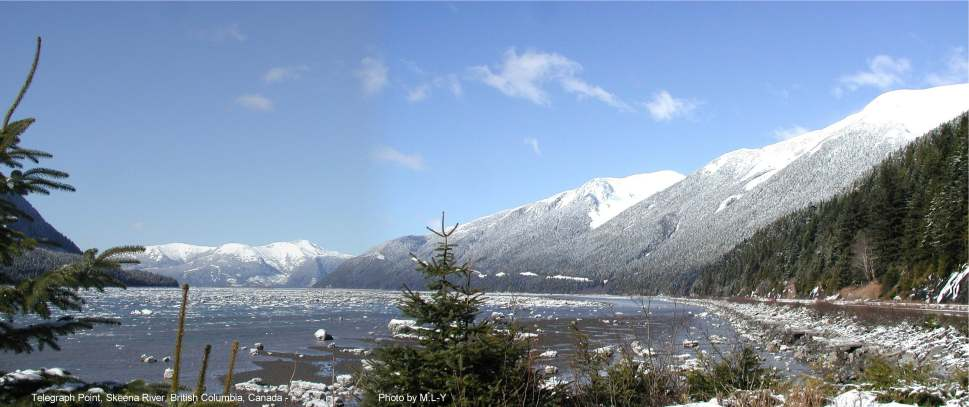
Skeena River at Telegraph Point, east of the city of Prince Rupert, British Columbia

The Skeena River originates at the southern end of Spatsizi Plateau, in a valley between Mount Gunanoot and Mount Thule, south of the Stikine River watershed. The abandoned track of BC Rail's Dease Lake Extension runs along the river in its upper course. It flows south-east, between the shallow peaks of the Skeena Mountains, through the McEvoy and Jackson flats. It continues in this direction until it passes the Slamgeesh Range, then flows westwards to Fourth Cabin, when it turns south through a shallow canyon below Poison Mountain. After Kuldo it takes an eastward turn, then flows south again below Cutoff Mountain and Mount Pope. It continues through rolling hills to the community of Kispiox and then Hazelton, where it receives the waters of Morice-Bulkley River, and turns south-west. The Yellowhead Highway and a Canadian National Railway track follow the course of the Skeena on this section. At Kitwanga, the river is crossed by Highway 37, and then turns south around the Seven Sisters Peaks and Bulkley Ranges, through the Skeena Provincial Forest, then between the Nass Ranges and Borden Glacier, past the ferry crossing at Usk, through the Kitselas Canyon, and then through the Kleanza Creek Provincial Park. It then flows south-west through the city of Terrace, where the river widens. It continues westwards, followed by the Highway 16 and Canadian National Railway line, passes near the Exchamsiks River Provincial Park, then flows into the Dixon Entrance at Eleanor Passage, between Port Edward and Port Essington, facing De Horsey Island.

== Tributaries ==
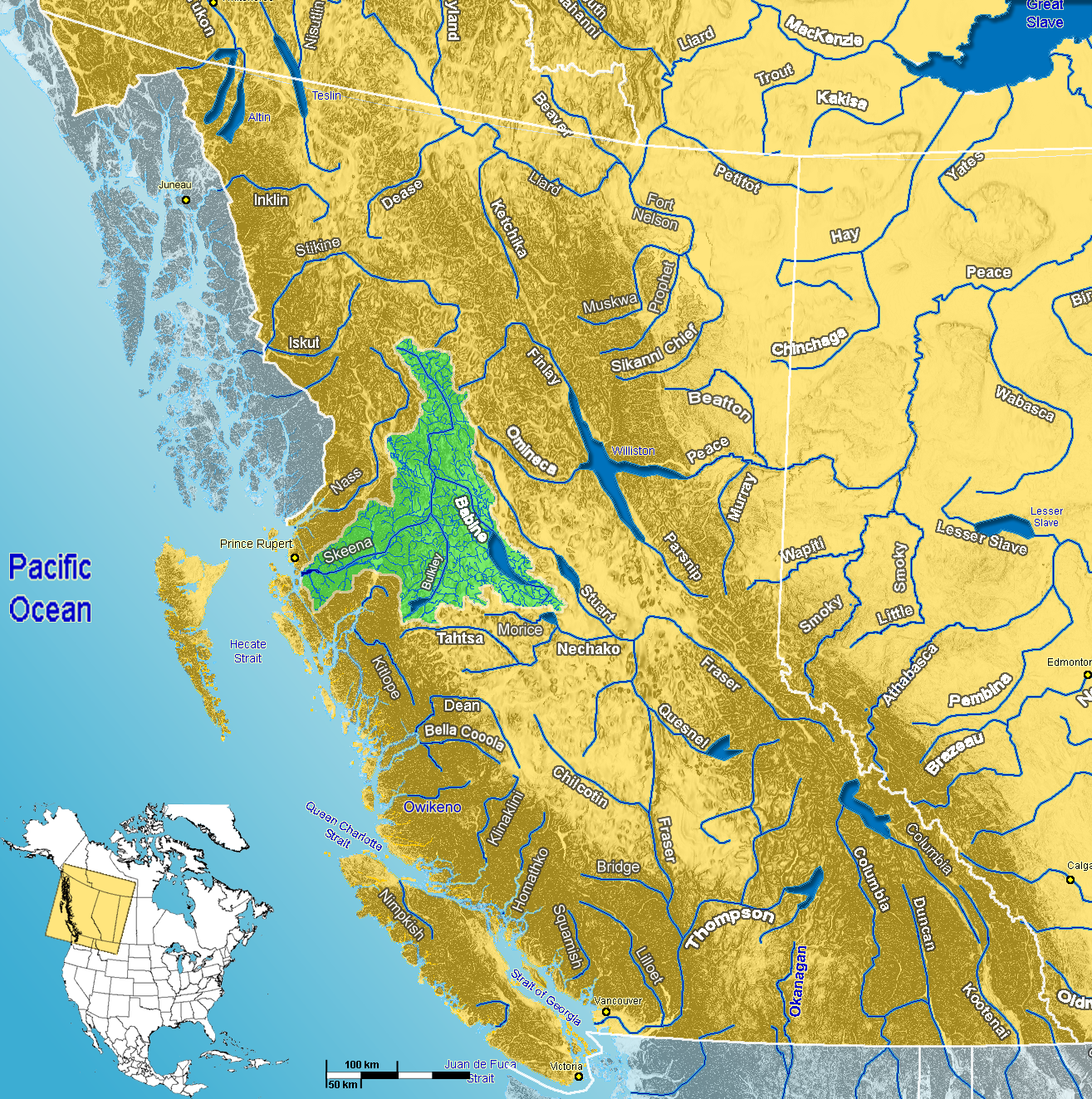
Watersheds in BC showing Skeena River

Partial listing from Fisheries and Oceans Canada
Upper Skeena

- Bear River, Johanson Creek, Mosque River, Shilahou Creek, Slamgeesh River, Sustut River

Middle Skeena

- Babine River, Boucher Creek, Buck Creek, Bulkley River, Comeau Creek, Cullon Creek, Date Creek, Deep Canoe Creek, Fulton River, Harold Price Creek, Kispiox River, Kitseguecla River, Maxan Creek, McCully Creek, McQueen Creek, Morice River, Nangeese River, Nanika River, Nilkitkwa River, Pinkut Creek, Richfield Creek, Shegunia River, Simpson Creek, Stephens Creek, Suskwa River, Sweetin River, Toboggan Creek

Lower Skeena

- Alwyn Creek, Big Falls Creek, Cedar Creek, Coldwater Creek, Copper River (see Zymoetz River below), Deep Creek, Dog Tag Creek, Ecstall River, Erlandsen Creek, Exchamsiks River, Exstew River, Fiddler Creek, Gitnadoix River, Goat Creek, Johnston Creek, Johnston Lake, Kaeen Creek, Kasiks River, Khtada River, Khyex River, Kitsumkalum River, Kitwanga River, Kleanza Creek, Lakelse River, Lean-To Creek, Limonite Creek, Magar Creek, Moonlit Creek, Salmon Run Creek, Scotia River, Sockeye Creek, Spring Creek, Star Creek, Thomas Creek, Trapline Creek, White Creek, Williams Creek, Zymagotitz River, Zymoetz River

== Wildlife ==
The Skeena supports a wide variety of fish and wildlife. The British Columbia Ministry of the Environment, through BC Parks, has designated a number of Ecological Reserves along the course of the river.

=== Fish ===
The Skeena is well known for its sport fishing, most notably salmon. The Skeena is also very important to the commercial fishing industry. For example, numbering 5 million spawning salmon a year, the Skeena is second only to the Fraser River in Canada in its capacity to produce sockeye salmon. However, in the last 40 years there has been a decrease in some of the fish species, leading to strict fishing regulations for the commercial fishery.

The following types of Pacific salmon can be found in the Skeena:

- Chinook salmon, sometimes known as king, Tyee, spring, Quinnat, tule, or blackmouth salmon.
- Chum salmon, sometimes known as dog or calico salmon.
- Coho salmon, sometimes known as silver salmon.
- Pink salmon, sometimes known as humpback salmon.
- Sockeye salmon, sometimes known as red salmon or blueback salmon.

Other anadromous species:

- Steelhead, anadromous form of rainbow trout

=== Bears ===
The rare Kermode bear lives in and near the Skeena Valley from Prince Rupert to Hazelton. The region is also home to many black bears and brown bears. Grizzly bears are less common in the area but the Khutzeymateen Grizzly Bear Sanctuary is located nearby.

== History ==
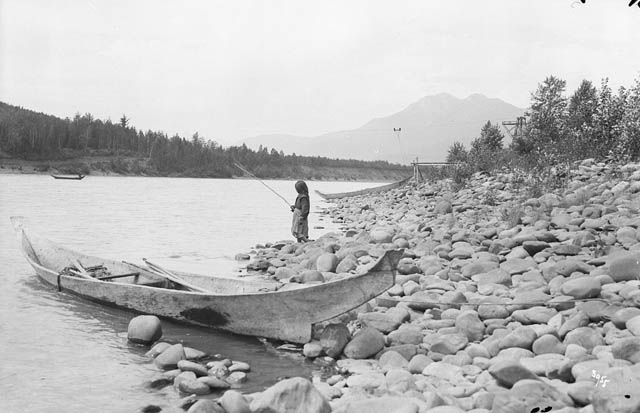
First Nations girl fishing on the Skeena River near Kitwanga, 1915

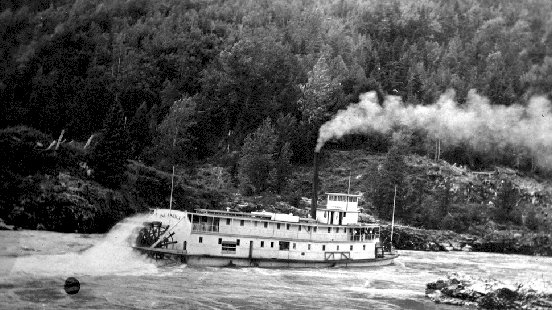
SS Inlander on the Skeena River at Kitselas Canyon, 1911

=== Indigenous peoples ===
The Skeena River watershed is the ancient homeland of the Tsimshian, Gitxsan, and Wet'suwet'en people.

During the 1862 Pacific Northwest smallpox epidemic thousands of indigenous people were evicted from large semi-permanent camps near Victoria and forced to return to their homelands, spreading smallpox throughout the Pacific Northwest coast. Groups of Tsimshian thus brought smallpox from Victoria to the Fort Simpson area, whence it spread widely starting in June 1862. Through the summer indigenous people arrived regularly at the fort to trade, contributing to the spread of smallpox throughout the Northern Coast, up the Skeena River and the Nass River into the British Columbia interior, devastating the Wetʼsuwetʼen and other interior First Nations. All Tsimshianic peoples suffered high death rates from smallpox in 1862–63: About 67% among the Southern Tsimshian, 23% for the Coast Tsimshian, 37% among the Nisga'a, and about 22% among the Gitxsan.

=== Fur trading ===
The Hudson's Bay Company's local headquarters were at Port Simpson, although Port Essington was also used extensively as a port for its sternwheelers.

=== Riverboats ===
While canoes played a crucial role on the Skeena for centuries, the age of the steamboat heralded a new era of boating on the Skeena. The first steam-powered vessel to enter the Skeena was the Union in 1864. In 1866 the Mumford attempted to ascend the river but was only able to reach the Kitsumkalum River. It was not until 1891 that the Hudson's Bay Company sternwheeler the Caledonia successfully negotiated through the Kitselas Canyon and reached Hazelton. A number of other steamers were built around the turn of the century, in part due to the growing fish industry and the gold rush.

== SkeenaWild Conservation Trust ==
In 2007 SkeenaWild Conservation Trust was formed to promote projects and initiatives by conservationists, First Nations in Canada, and local communities to protect the natural sustainability of the Skeena watershed and its wild salmon ecosystems. The organization has a large payroll and is dependant on convincing the public that salmon are in crisis. One of SkeenaWild's main goals is to develop and implement a strategy for long-term stewardship of forest carbon in the Skeena watershed.

== See also ==
- List of rivers of British Columbia
- Steamboats of the Skeena River
- List of ships in British Columbia
- Gitxsan
