= List of historical ships in British Columbia =

The following is a list of vessels notable in the history of the Canadian province of British Columbia, including Spanish, Russian, American and other military vessels and all commercial vessels on inland waters as well as on saltwater routes up to the end of World War II (1945).

== A ==
Ship	Other names	Captain(s)	Type	Tons	Draft	Registry (flag)	Owner(s)	Events/locations	Dates in BC	Demise	Comments
Activo	Activa	Bodega y Quadra, Cosme Beltodano, Salvador Menéndez, Salvador Fidalgo, José María Narváez, others	brigantine	200 ton, 16 guns, 2 masts (originally 195 ton displacement, carried twelve 3-pounders and two 3-pounder swivel guns)		Spain	Spanish Navy Dept. of San Blas		Keel laid 9 December 1791; completed in 60 days; cost 29,854 pesos. Launched 29 February 1792.	Remained in service of San Blas Naval Base until at least 1808.	Built as a schooner specifically for Bodega's 1792 diplomatic voyage to Nootka Sound and named Activa. In 1793 or 1794 was reconfigured as a brigantine and renamed Activo.
SS Abyssinia	Abyssinia		Steamship: passenger and freight liner	3651 tons			CPR (chartered from Cunard)	1887, TransPacific record on inaugural CPR shipment from Orient to NY/UK	1887–1891	destroyed by fire	First of CPR liners, pre-Empress series
Adventure	Horcasitas, Orcasitas, Orcacitas	Robert Haswell	sloop, merchant	about 45		U.S., Spain	Boston merchants, then Spanish Navy Dept. of San Blas	First U.S. ship built in the Pacific, traded to Bodega y Quadra in 1792.	1792–		Built at Clayoquot Sound over the winter of 1791-1792 by the crews of the Columbia Rediviva and Lady Washington. Some materials were brought from Boston but most were harvested at Adventure Cove, Clayoquot Sound.
SS Albion											
SS Alert											
Alexander (1796 ship)		Asa Dodge, John Brown	brigantine, converted to brig, converted to ship	134	68 feet in length		Abiel Winship, Charles Winship; ten other Boston merchants	Built in Pembroke, Massachusetts.	1789, 1800, 1803		Visited Nahwitti in northern Vancouver Island in 1800, opening a lasting trading relationship between Americans and the Kwakwaka'wakw.
SS Alice											
Alpha			steam launch					Arrow Lakes and Columbia River during CPR construction			
Amelia	formerly French Emilie	Trotter	brig			United States	Providence, Rhode Island merchants	At Nootka Sound in May, 1793, then to Haida Gwaii in company with Jefferson.	1793, 1795, 1797		
Ann		James Hale, then Stephen Hersey	Brig	204 tons		US	Bryant & Sturgis and Boardman & Pope	Built 1816, Pembroke, MA. In 1819 arrived in Kaigani Haida territory and traded along the Northwest Coast. Sailed to Canton in late 1819, then to Boston. A second voyage left Boston in 1822 and spent two years in Hawaii, California, and probably the Northwest Coast. Sold to Russians at Bodega Bay in late 1823.	1819, 1823		
Aranzazu		Juan Bautista Matute, Jacinto Caamaño, John Kendrick Jr, others	frigate			Spain	Spanish Navy Dept. of San Blas	scientific/ethnographic survey	circa 1789-1795		Also spelled Aranzazú
Argonaut	Argonauta	James Colnett				Britain	King George's Sound Company, then joint company with John Meares and partners	Captured by Spain during Nootka Crisis			After captured by Spain was briefly part of the Spanish Navy at San Blas and called a packet boat, Argonauta. It was to be part of the 1790 fleet sailing to Nootka Sound under Eliza, but the San Carlos was used instead.
SS Arthur											
Astrolabe	L'Astrolabe	Fleuriot de Langle	frigate	500 tons		France	French Navy	La Pérouse Expedition. With Boussole, was 5th and 6th ships to visit Hawaii.	late 1780s		see also Boussole
Atahualpa		Dixey Wildes (1st voyage), Oliver Porter, Adams (2nd voyage), William Sturgis (3rd voyage), John Suter (4th voyage)		210 tons		U.S., Russia	Theodore Lyman and associates. Russian American Company.	Made four voyages toe the Northwest Coast. Attacked in Milbanke Sound, 1805; Captain Porter and 8 men killed. Coordinated with Lydia (II) after attack. Sold to Russians and renamed Bering.	1801–1802, 1804-1805 1807, 1812-1813	Wrecked at Waimea Bay.	Built in Kennebunk. Sister ship of the Guatimozin. With Lydia (II) (see that entry) sold to Russians for 20,000 sealskins.
Atlinto			gasoline-screw			None	Sold to John Noland in 1927.	Operated on Atlin Lake.	1911–present	On display at Atlin.	Built in 1911. This boat is not to be confused with the sidewheeler Atlinto, built in 1904, and which became the Glengarry in 1906.
Atrevida		José de Bustamante	corvette	120 foot length, 306 tons, 16 officers and 86 men		Spain	Spanish Navy		Launched 1788, returned to Spain 1794		Twin of the Descubierta

== B ==
Ship	Other names	Captain(s)	Type	Tons	Draft	Registry (flag)	Owner(s)	Events/locations	Dates in BC	Demise	Comments
RMS BC Express		Joseph Bucey	sternwheeler	Gross 449 Registered 283			Barnard's Express		Launched at Soda Creek June 1912	Retired in 1920 at South Fort George	
Beaver			sidewheeler			Britain	HBC	Maritime Fur Trade and military use from Columbia River to Alaska Panhandle	1836-1888	Wrecked at Prospect Point, Stanley Park	Boulton and Watt beam engines
Belle Savage		David Ockington	Brig	183 tons		US		1801, apparently was attacked by 150 Gwaʼsala under "Chief Wacosh" in Smith Inlet, vessel was captured but retaken.	1801		Built 1799 at Braintree, Massachusetts. Sometimes sailed in company of Atahualpa.
Blair of Athol			Steam-screw, one 6ʺ × 5½ʺ cyl.	11		Canada #111608	Joseph G. “Scottie” Morrison (1898-1902); Margaret Ward (1902-1904); Northern Lumber Co. (1904-1905)	Operated on Atlin Lake.	1898-1905	Broken up in 1905.	Built in 1900 by Morrison at New Westminster, B.C.
Bordelais		Camille de Roquefeuil	Ship	200 tons, 8 guns, 34 crew		France	Balguerie Jr., Bordeaux, France	Maritime Fur Trade	1817, 1818		1817, sailed from France to Chile, California, Nootka Sound.
Boston		John Salter	"trading ship"			US		On 22 March 1803, was seized by Maquinna, all but two of the crew "murdered"; a "desperate attempt by Maquinna to regain his prestige.	1803		Only survivors John Thompson and John R. Jewitt, the latter's account of his captivity is a classic in Pacific Northwest early history. Both lived in captivity at Nootka Sound until rescued in July 1805 by Captain Samuel Hill of the Boston brig Lydia.
Boussole	La Pérouse	frigate	500 tons		France	French Navy	With Astrolabe, 5th and 6th ships to visit Hawaii.	late 1780s			
Butterworth		William Brown		400 tons		Britain	William Brown	Maritime fur trading in 1790s			Part of the "Butterworth squadron", including Jackall and Prince Lee Boo
RMS B.X.		Owen Forrester Browne	sternwheeler	Gross 513 Registered 283	16 inches	Canada	Barnard's Express		Launched in Soda Creek May 13, 1910	Sank in August 1919, Salvaged and Retired October 1919	

== C ==
Ship	Other names	Captain(s)	Type	Tons	Draft	Registry (flag)	Owner(s)	Events/locations	Dates in BC	Demise	Comments
Cadboro			Schooner, 4 guns, 12 men	71		Britain	HBC	carried J. Douglas from Ft. Nisqually to site of Ft. Victoria, 1842	Launched 1826	Sold (1846?)	HBC ship used for the PNW coast trade
SS Caledonia											
Captain Cook	Betsey (renamed Captain Cook in 1785)	Henry Laurie (or Lawrie)	brig	350 tons, crew of 61, including James Strange (1786 voyage)		Britain	James Strange and David Scott (future chairman of East India Company)	Left John Mackay at Nootka Sound to collect furs until Strange returned, but he never did. Mackay was taken aboard the Imperial Eagle in 1787. Under direction of James Strange, explored and named Queen Charlotte Sound; continued north to Prince William Sound. Tried but failed to sail to Copper Island. Returned to Macau in December 1786.	1786		Sailed with the Experiment
SS Cariboo		Archibald Jameison					Archibald Jameison	At 2 in the morning on August 2, 1861, the ship exploded as it was leaving Victoria harbour. 7 people died.		Sunk August 2, 1861	
Caroline (merchant ship)		Charles Derby, William Sturgis		150 tons			Thomas & James Lamb, Russell Sturgis, and Ebenezer Preble (1st voyage), J & T Lamb, Sturgis, and James & Thomas H. Perkins (2nd).	Captain Derby died in 1802, First Mate Sturgis took command.	1801-1802, 1804-1805		Profittable 2nd voyage; acquired 4,900 sea otter pelts.
Casca			sternwheeler, two 16ʺ x 72ʺ cyl.	590		Canada #103919	Casca Trading & Transportation Co. (1898 to 1899 or 1900); Otto R. Bremmer (1899 or 1900 to 1903); Ironside, Rennie & Campbell Co. (1903-1904); White Pass & Yukon Route (1904-1911)	Operated on the Stikine River in 1898 and 1899.	1898-1899	Broken up at Lower Laberge, Yukon in 1911.	Built in 1898 by the Esquimalt Marine Ry. Co. at Victoria, B.C.
SS Cecil											
SS Champion											
Charlotte		James D. Ingersoll		155 tons		US	Seventeen Boston owners.	Built at Scituate, Massachusetts, 1800; in Haida territory in 1801; sold in 1802.	1801		Went to avenge the Haida attack on the Belle Savage. Five chiefs were lured on board then murdered. Later the Haida avenged this event with the murder of Bernard Magee of the Globe.
MV Charlotte		Owen Forrester Browne Frank Odin	sternwheeler	Gross 217 Registered 79		Canada	North British Columbia Navigation Company		Launched at Quesnel on August 3, 1896	Wrecked at Fort George Canyon, salvaged and abandoned at Quesnel 1910	
Chernui Orel						Russia					
Chichagoff	Chichagov					Russia					
MV Chilco	Nechacco	John Bonser in 1909-10 George Ritchie 1910-11	sternwheeler	Gross 129 Registered 76		Canada	Fort George Lumber and Navigation Company		Launched at Quesnel May 25, 1909	Tore apart in ice jam at Cottonwood Canyon in April 1911. Nothing recovered	First sternwheeler to navigate the Grand Canyon of the Fraser
MV Chilcotin		D.A. Foster	sternwheeler	Gross 435 Registered 274			Fort George Lumber and Navigation Company		Launched at Soda Creek July 20, 1910	Retired 1914	
City of Ainsworth		Lean	sternwheeler			Canada				Sank in storm on Kootenay Lake November 29, 1898, 9 lives lost	Wreck is heritage site
Colonel Moody											
Columbia			Barque, 6 guns, 24 men	308 tons		Britain	HBC	Launched 1835		Sold (1850?)	HBC ship used for the PNW coast trade.
Columbia						US	Columbia River and Kootenay Steam Navigation Company	Arrow Lakes-Columbia River service		destroyed by fire	
Columbia Rediviva	Columbia	Robert Gray, John Kendrick	full-rigged ship	Burthen: 213 tons.	Length: 83′6″. Beam: 24′2″. Draft: 11'. Crew: 16-18 min, 30-31 max.	U.S.		First exploration of the Columbia River	Built 1787 (or rebuilt, "rediviva" meaning "revived"), Plymouth, MA.	Decommissioned 15 Oct 1806, salvaged.	sometimes sailed with Lady Washington
SS Commodore											
Concepción		Francisco de Eliza, others	depot-guardship, frigate, or corvette			Spain	Spanish Navy Dept. of San Blas				Guarded Fort San Miguel in 1790 and 1791. Described by Bodega: "is no more than a corvette with 26 small-calibre guns."
MV Conveyor		Jack Shannon	sternwheeler	gross 725 registered 457		Canada	Foley, Welch and Stewart		Launched on Skeena River in 1909, Fraser River in 1912	Retired at Fort George	Worked on both GTP and PGE rail construction
Convoy		William H. McNeil	Brig	135 tons		US	Josiah Marshall, Boston	Maritime Fur Trade	1826		
SS Consort											
Cortez						Spain					
SS Cowlitz						Britain	HBC	Launched 1840		Sold 1851	HBC ship used for the PNW coast trade.
Crusader		Benjamin Pickens	Brig	110 tons		US	Eliab Grimes.	Maritime Fur Trade	1832		
Cutch	Jessie Banning, Bogota		schooner-rigged steamship			Canada	Union Steamship Company of British Columbia	Union Steamship Co's first successful passenger ship			Later served as a gunboat in South America

== D ==
Ship	Other names	Captain(s)	Type	Tons	Draft	Registry (flag)	Owner(s)	Events/locations	Dates in BC	Demise	Comments
Dare (schooner)			3-masted schooner							rwewced Dec. 23, 1880 off Carmanah Point while en route from San Francisco to Tacoma	home port North Bend OR; Dare Point near Carmanah is named after the ship.
SS Demaris Cove											
Derby (1803 ship)		Benjamin Smith (1st voyage), James Bennett, then Thomas Brown (2nd voyage)	ship	300 tons		United States	J. & T.H. Perkins and James & Thomas Lamb, and Benjamin Smith		1807, 1810		Built 1803 in Salem, Massachusetts. William Sturgis on board during 2nd voyage.
Descubierta		Alessandro Malaspina	corvette	120 foot length, 306 tons, 16 officers and 86 men		Spain	Spanish Navy		Launched 1788, in Pacific Northwest 1791, returned to Spain 1794		Twin of the Atrevida
Despatch (ship)	Dispatch	Elias Nordbery, then John Caswell (1st voyage); Jonathan Bowers (2nd); William Breck (3rd); Samuel A. Dorr (4th)	Ship	106 tons		United States	Dorr and Sons of Boston	In 1795 rescued the only survivor of the Resolution, tender to the Jefferson, whose crew, including Captain Burling and Solomon Kendrick had been killed at Cumshewa. In July 1795 Captain Nordbery was accidentally killed by the Kaigani Haida Chief Altatsee. In May 1799 at Kaigani helped negotiate an end to a mutiny on the Boston ship Ulysses, and witnessed execution of two native captives by Captain Rowan of the Eliza.	1795, 1797, 1799, 1801		Made four voyages to the Northwest Coast.
Dobraia Namerenia						Russia					
SS Dolphin											
SS Dryad				204 tons		Britain	HBC	Launched 1825, purchased by HBC 1829.		Sold 1836	HBC ship used for the PNW coast trade.
Duchesnay	Gen. Jeff C. Davis (1900-1933)		sternwheeler, two 12ʺ x 54ʺ cyl.	277		Canada #107151	Canadian Pacific Ry. (1898-1899); Edward J. Rathbone (1899-1900); U.S. Army (1900-1922); Alaskan Engineering Commission (1922-1923); The Alaska Railroad (1923-1933)	Operated between Wrangell, Alaska and points on the Stikine River in 1898.	1898-1899	Broken up at Nenana, Alaska in 1933.	Built in 1898 by C.P. Ry. at Vancouver, Washington.
SS Duchess of San Lorenzo											

== E ==
Ship	Other names	Captain(s)	Type	Tons	Draft	Registry (flag)	Owner(s)	Events/locations	Dates in BC	Demise	Comments
SS Eagle				193 tons		Britain	HBC	Launched 1824, purchased by HBC 1827.		Sold 1837	HBC ship used for the PNW coast trade.
Eleanora	Eleanor	Simon Metcalfe	brig	190 tons		U.S.		Almost captured during 1789 Nootka Crisis.	1787 or 1788; 1789, 1790, 1794	Captured and destroyed by Haida under Koyah.	One of the first American vessels on Northwest Coast, possibly predating Columbia and Lady Washington.
Eliza		James Rowan	Ship	135 tons		US	J. & T.H. Perkins, James Magee, Russell Sturgis, and other Boston merchants.	At "Nass", May 1799, Captain Rowan captured Haida Chief Scotsi and his brother. In 1796 Rowan had served on the Sea Otter under Stephen Hills, who was killed by Scotsi at Cumshewa. In revenge Rowan arranged the execution of Scotsi and his brother by Kaigani Haida at Tattiskey, witnessed by the Boston ships Ulysses, Despatch, and Eliza, and about 2,000 natives. About the same time Roman and Captain Breck of the Despatch ended a mutiny on the Ulysses. William Sturgis transferred to the Ulysses. Later in 1799 Rowan became the first American captain to try trading illegally in California.	1799		Built 1796, Providence, Rhode Island. William Sturgis part of crew.
SS Eliza Anderson											
Ellwood			Sail	5		Canada #107637	Thomas H. Worsnop	Operated on Atlin Lake.	1898-191_	Registry closed in 1916.	Built in 1898 at Seattle, Washington.
SS Emily Harris											
SS Emma Rooke											
RMS Empress of Japan			steamship/ocean liner	5,905 GRT		Canada	Canadian Pacific Railway (CPR)	trans-Pacific speed record until 1914		1926, scrapped	
RMS Empress of Japan	RMS Empress of Scotland, SS Hanseatic		steamship/ocean liner	30,030 GRT		Canada, Germany	Canadian Pacific Steamships (CP)			1966, fire in NYC harbor	
SS England											
Enterprise (I)		Ezekiel Hubbell, and possibly Joseph O'Cain and/or James Scott	Ship	240 tons		United States	New York merchants	Encountered the Atahualpa in Sitka, April 1801.	1801		
Enterprise (II)		John Ebbets (or Ebberts)	Ship	291 tons		United States	John Jacob Astor	At Nahwitti, June 1810, then Sitka	1810-1811, 1816-1817		Built 1807 in Philadelphia. Two voyages to Northwest Coast, wintering in Hawaii.
MV Enterprise		JW Doane and Thomas Wright	sternwheeler			Canada	Gustavus Blin-Wright	Made one trip to Takla Lake for Omenica Gold Rush	Launched at Alexandria May 9, 1863	Wrecked on Trembleur Lake 1871	First sternwheeler on upper Fraser River. First of only two to travel to Takla Lake
Enterprise (1861)		William Alexander Mouat and George Rudlin	sidewheeler	150			Hudson's Bay Company	The first wooden side-wheeler to travel between Victoria and New Westminster on the Fraser River	Built at San Francisco in 1861 and bought by Hudson's Bay Company in 1862	Collided with the steamer R.P. Rithet (sternwheeler) 28 July 1885	
SS Europa											
SS Exact											
Experiment		John Guise		150 tons, crew of "about 36"		Britain	James Strange and David Scott (future chairman of East India Company)	Maritime fur trading along the coast from Nootka Sound to Prince William Sound. With James Strange aboard sailed to China, arriving at Macau in November 1786.	1786		Sailed with the Captain Cook

== F ==
Ship	Other names	Captain(s)	Type	Tons	Draft	Registry (flag)	Owner(s)	Events/locations	Dates in BC	Demise	Comments
Fair American		Thomas Humphrey Metcalfe	schooner or brig	24 tons		U.S.	Possibly Simon Metcalfe.	Separated from Eleanora near Macau in 1789, sailed via Unalaska to Nootka Sound. There captured by Spain during the Nootka Crisis. Returned by 1790 and sailed to Hawaii for rendezvous with Eleanora. Attacked and captured by Native Hawaiians in revenge for Simon Metcalfe's Olowalu Massacre, with only one survivor, Isaac Davis.	1789		Built in New Jersey, 1784. Tender to Simon Metcalfe's Eleanora. Captured and crewed by Hawaiians under Kamehameha I. Later returned to New York and enrolled for coast service in 1795.
Fairy		William Rogers				US (Boston)	William Douglas	Maritime Fur Trade	1791, 1794		Owned by William Douglas, captain of the Grace and formerly of the Iphigenia.
Favorita		Ignacio de Arteaga	frigate			Spain	Spanish Navy Dept. of San Blas		1779		sailed with Princesa under Bodega y Quadra
Felice Adventurer	Felice, Felice Adventure, Feliz Aventureira, Feliz Aventurero, Felice Aventura	Ostensibly Francisco José Viana, but really John Meares				Portugal	John Meares and partners	Maritime Fur Trade vessel in the 1780s, captured with three others of Meares' ships by Spain in 1789, causing the Nootka Crisis but released in 1789 or 1790.			In 1788 carried materials for building the North West America to Nootka Sound. Together with the Iphigenia, flying the Portuguese flag to evade East India Company monopoly in the region, but actually British in operation
Fenis and St. Joseph	Sao Jao y Fenix, San José el Fénix	Ostensibly John de Barros Andrade, but really Robert Duffin	brig			Portugal	Probably John Meares and partners	transported Zachary Mudge to China, as part of the Vancouver Expedition	1792		sailing under a flag of convenience
Florencia											
Florinda											
Flying Dutchman		William Moore						first lumber shipment from Burrard Inlet; Moodyville August 1863			
MV Fort Fraser	Doctor	John Bonser (1910) George Ritchie (1911–13)	sternwheeler	gross 33, registered 21		Canada	Fort George Lumber and Navigation Company		launched at Soda Creek June 1910	retired in 1913	First sternwheeler to navigate the upper Fraser River to Tête Jaune Cache
SS Fort Yale	Idahoe	Captain Smith Jamieson (killed by boiler explosion on this ship)	Stern wheel steamer	110 feet long.			The Yale Steam Navigation Company Ltd, British Columbia	Designed by James Trahey. Launched from Laing & Scorgie's? (or "Laings Ways"?) shipyard in James Bay, Victoria. Blast from boiler explosion was so great that a 90-pound piece of the boiler was blown a quarter mile inland.	Launched on Oct 15, 1860 James Bay, Victoria, BC	Boiler explosion April 14, 1861	
Forty-Nine		Leonard White						Big Bend Gold Rush/CPR Survey	1865-1866/1870s	end of gold rush, revived for CPR survey	Big Bend service was from Marcus, Washington to La Porte, British Columbia; from 1871 supply ship for Walter Moberly's survey party

== G ==
Ship	Other names	Captain(s)	Type	Tons	Draft	Registry (flag)	Owner(s)	Events/locations	Dates in BC	Demise	Comments
SS Ganymede				214 tons		Britain	HBC	Launched 1827, purchased by HBC 1830.		Sold 1837.	HBC ship used for the PNW coast trade.
SS George Emery											
SS Georgianna											
Gladys			Alcohol vapor screw (1899-1906); Steam-screw (1906-1930)	9		Canada #107722	North-West Mounted Police (1899-1904); Royal Canadian Mounted Police (1904-1910); Pine Creek Power Co. (1910-1914); Inland Trading Co. (1914-1930)	Operated on Atlin Lake.	1899-1930	Abandoned at Atlin in 1930.	Built in 1899 by Marine Vapor Engine Co. at Jersey City, New Jersey.
Glengarry	Atlinto (1904-1906)		sidewheeler			None	William J. Smith and James D. Durie	Operated on Atlin Lake.	1904 to 1907 or 1908	Retired in 1907 or 1908.	Built in 1904 by Smith at Atlin. This boat is not to be confused with a gasoline-screw boat of the name Atlinto, which was built in 1911, and which has been put on display at Atlin.
Globe		Bernard Magee, then William Cunningham	Ship	245 tons		United States	Thomas H. Perkins, Bernard Magee, James Magee.	October, 1801, Captain Magee killed by Haida at Skidegate.	1801-1802, maritime fur trade		Built 1800, Newbury, Massachusetts.
Golden Hind	Golden Hinde, Golden Hynde, Pelican	Francis Drake	galleon	300	9 feet	England		circumnavigation			Alleged to have visited the BC Coast
Grace		William Douglas, R.D. Coolidge	schooner	85 tons		Flew US flag but was never in a US port and had no registration papers.		Maritime Fur Trade. Sometimes sailed with Lady Washington under John Kendrick; together made first American contact with Japan in 1791.	approx. 1790-1793		Captained by same William Douglas who earlier captained the Iphigenia and was a British associate of Meares; later captained American ships and flew under the US flag.
Griffon		Marcus T. Pierce, Charles Taylor, W.C. Little	Brig	180 tons, 8 guns, 24 crew.		US	Bryant & Sturgis and Boardman & Pope; Hawaiian owners after 1830.	Maritime Fur Trade	1825-1829		Built at Medford, Massachusetts. Spent four years on Northwest Coast, with short trips to Hawaii and California. Shipped furs to Canton on other vessels. In 1830 and 1832 hunted Californian sea otters with crews of Northwest Coast natives.
SS Growler											
Guatimozin		S. Bumstead, William Clanville (or Glanville)		211 tons		US	Theodore Lyman and associates, Boston		1801-1803, 1805, 1807–1808	Wrecked on New Jersey shore, February 1810.	Maritime Fur Trade vessel; sister ship of the Atahualpa. Made three voyages to Northwest Coast.
Gustavus III	Also spelled Gustaf III. See Mercury	John Cox									

== H ==
Ship	Other names	Captain(s)	Type	Tons	Draft	Registry (flag)	Owner(s)	Events/locations	Dates in BC	Demise	Comments
Halcyon		Charles William Barkley	brig	80 tons. Or 60 tons.		Britain			1792		Sailed with Venus. Visited Alaska but probably not present-day British Columbia.
Hamilton		Lamuel Porter (1st and 2nd voyages); William Martain (3rd and 4th voyages)	Ship	233 tons		United States	Lyman and Associates; William Sturgis, other Boston merchants.	At Tattiskey (south end Dall Island), 1806 or 1807, one crew wounded by Kaigani Haida, then "a great many...numerous innocent" Haida were killed around the ship in revenge; at Nass between 1809 and 1811 a conflict escalated to violence and several crew killed; during 4th voyage often sailed in company of Mentor, Thaddeus, Rob Roy, and Volunteer.	On Northwest Coast 1806–1807, 1809–1811, 1815–1818, 1820–1822.		Built in Maine; Made four maritime fur trade voyages to Northwest Coast, 1805–1823.
Hamlin			sternwheeler, two 16ʺ x 72ʺ cyl.	515		Canada #107144	Canadian Pacific Ry. (1898-1901); White Pass & Yukon Route (1901-1903); John Banser, William McCallum, and David Reider (1903-1904); Thomas J. Kickham (1904-1910); Edward J. Coyle (dealer, 1910–1911); Hamlin Towing Co. (1911-1917); James H. Green (1917-1918); Defiance Packing Co. (1918-1923)	Operated between Wrangell, Alaska and points on the Stikine River in 1898. In the Vancouver, B.C. area, 1903–1910. In the Victoria, B.C. area 1910–1911. On the Fraser River, 1911–1923.	1898 and 1903-1923	Foundered in the Fraser River in 1923.	Built in 1898 by the C.P. Ry. at Vancouver. Not used under W.P.&Y.R. ownership.
Hancock		Samuel Crowell	brig	94 tons		United States	Samuel Crowell, Joseph Cordis, and Edward Jones	first US vessel to penetrate Masset Sound.	1791, 1792, 1793		Built in Salem, Massachusetts, 1784. Crowell and his men built a tender for the Hancock on Maast Island, off Masset, in the summer of 1791, which was the first European-type vessel to be built in the Haida Gwaii.
Hancock (II)		John Crocker		205 tons.		United States	Dorr and Sons.	In May, 1799, mutiny at Sitka, Alaska, seven crew left ashore.	On Northwest Coast 1799.		Built in Boston, 1793; maritime fur trader; carried a commission as a privateer while on Northwest Coast; involved people (owners, crew, etc.) included later Northwest Coast captains Nathaniel Dorr, William Dorr, and Edmund Fanning (of the Tonquin).
SS Harmon											
SS Harpooner											
Hazard (I)		Benjamin Swift (1st-3rd voyages), William Smith (4th voyage).	Brig			United States	J. & T.H. Perkins, James Magee, Russell Sturgis, Eleazar Johnson. Margaret Magee after 1802 (only Boston woman known to have owned a share in a maritime fur trading vessel).	1798, lost mate and four crew on Columbia Bar. 1808, on return to Boston boarded by Royal Navy and three crew pressed into service as British citizens.	1797-1798, 1800–1801, 1803–1804, 1806-1807		Built in 1796 at Newburyport; made four maritime fur trade voyages to Northwest Coast, wintering on the coast (1st and 4th voyages) or in Hawaii (2nd and 3rd).
Hazard (II)		James Rowan (formerly of Eliza)	Ship			United States			On Northwest Coast 1803–1805; 1803 visits California, 1804 at Haida Gwaii.		Home port, Providence, Rhode Island; in 1803 begged permission to stay in California a while by reason of the danger of trading with Northwest Coast natives.
Hazel B No. 1		Harry A. Barrington, Sydney C. Barrington, W. Hill Barrington	340 H.P. Diesel-screw	102		U.S.A. #243456	Barrington Transportation Co. (1941-1945); Harry Donnelley (1945-1949); Kuskokwim Transportation Co. (1949 to 1952 or 1953); Alaska Towing & Salvage, Inc. (from 1952 or 1953)	Operated between Wrangell, Alaska and points on the Stikine River from 1941 to 1944.	1941-1944	Abandoned between 1965 & 1967	Built in 1941 by Barrington at Wrangell. The first Barrington boat named Hazel B had been built in 1914, and never operated in British Columbia.
1st Hazel B No. 2		Harry A. Barrington, Sydney C. Barrington, W. Hill Barrington	180 H.P. gasoline-screw	135		U.S.A. #214262	Barrington Transportation Co.	Operated between Wrangell, Alaska and points on the Stikine River from 1916 to 1931.	1916-1931	Destroyed by fire at Wrangell in 1932.	Built in 1916 by Barrington at Anchorage, Alaska.
2nd Hazel B No. 2		Harry A. Barrington, Sydney C. Barrington, W. Hill Barrington	270 H.P. Diesel-screw	143		U.S.A. #231646	Barrington Transportation Co. (1932 to 1952 or 1953); Alaska Dept. of Health (1952 or 1953 to 1955); Donald A. Peterson (1955-1967)	Operated between Wrangell, Alaska and points on the Stikine River from 1932 to 1941.	1932-1941	Registry closed between 1981 & 1988.	Built in 1932 by Marine Construction Co. at Seattle, Washington.
Hazel B No. 3		Harry A. Barrington, Sydney C. Barrington, W. Hill Barrington, Alan V. Ritchie	95 H.P. gasoline-screw	14		U.S.A. #215503	Barrington Transportation Co. (1917-1944); Barrington Ritchie and Early Co. (1944-1949)	Operated between Wrangell, Alaska and points on the Stikine River from 1917 to 1949.	1917-1949	Foundered on the Stikine River in 1949.	Built in 1917 by Charles M. Binkley Sr. at Wrangell.
Hazel B No. 4		Harry A. Barrington, Sydney C. Barrington, W. Hill Barrington	400 H.P. gasoline-screw	70		U.S.A. #218593	Barrington Transportation Co.	Operated between Wrangell, Alaska and points on the Stikine River	1919-193_	Registry closed between 1933 & 1939.	Built in 1919 by Barrington at Wrangell.
Hazelton		John Bonser Joseph Bucey	sternwheeler			Canada	Robert Cunningham and Hudson's Bay Company		1901-1912	made obsolete on Skeena River due to completion of GTP	sold to Prince Rupert Yacht Club
Herald		William J. Hammond (or Hammat)	Ship	303 tons.		United States	More than 80 owners in 1822; in 1828 registered by Bryant & Sturgis with Paschal Pope.	Early career details unknown	1820s; 1829 at Kaigani in company with Volunteer and Griffin.		Built 1818 at Newbury for maritime fur trade. Early career details unknown. 1828-1829 voyage better known, John Suter on board (former captain and partner in several PNW ventures).
Hope (1789 brigantine)		Joseph Ingraham	Brigantine.	72 tons.		U.S.	Thomas Handasyd Perkins, Russell Sturgis, and James Magee.	1791, Ingraham fashioned copper neckrings for trade which became highly popular that season, to great profit; in 1792 the fad had passed and Ingraham could hardly give them away and the venture lost money.	Built 1789 at Kittery; on Northwest Coast 1791, then China, then returned to NW Coast 1792.	captured in the Quasi-War and sold off in 1797	Maritime fur trader; In 1790 carried 12 cannon, 6 swivel guns, and other "War implements", with crew of 16. Ingraham's log published as Journal of the Brigantine Hope on a Voyage to the Northwest Coast of North America, 1790-1792. Parts of supercargo Ebenezer Dorr's journal survive.

== I ==
Ship	Other names	Captain(s)	Type	Tons	Draft	Registry (flag)	Owner(s)	Events/locations	Dates in BC	Demise	Comments
Il’mena	Lydia	Captain Wadsworth	brig	90 tons		Russia	Russian American Company		1814		See Lydia (II), which was purchased by RAC and renamed Ilmena.
Imperial Eagle	Loudon, changed to Imperial Eagle when adopting the Austrian flag.	Charles Barkley	full-rigged ship	400 tons		Austria	Private trading company; backers included John Meares	Maritime Fur Trade	Sailed for PNW under Charles Barclay in Nov. 1786. In Hawaii, May 1787. At Nootka Sound in 1788; largest ship to ever enter Friendly Cove. Ship confiscated in India around 1790, by East India Company or John Meares.		British but registered as Austrian to illegally evade East India Company trade monopoly. First ship to sail up the western shore of Oahu. Frances Barkley was the first woman to visit and first to write about British Columbia.
Inlander		Joseph Bucey 1910-11 John Bonser 1911-12	sternwheeler			Canada	Prince Rupert and Skeena River Navigation Company		1910-1912	abandoned at Port Essington	last sternwheeler on Skeena River
India Packet		Captain Rogers		226 tons, 88 feet long.		United States		1796-97, cruised northern coast, procuring 1,100 prime skins in Haida Gwaii and over 2,200 in total, sold in Canton and cargo of teas and "China curiosities" purchased; very profitable venture.	Sailed from Boston (1796) to Northwest Coast (1796-1797) to Canton (1797) to Boston (1798).		Built 1795 in Braintree. Ebenezer Johnson among crew, whose narrative was published in 1798 (one of very few American maritime fur trade accounts published during the trading era.
Iphigenia Nubiana	, Iphigenia, Ephigenia	Ostensibly Francisco José Viana (Portuguese), but really William Douglas				Portugal	John Meares and partners	Maritime Fur Trade on the PNW coast, 1788–89. Captured with three others of Meares' ships by Spain in 1789, causing the Nootka Crisis, released in 1789 or 1790.			Maritime Fur Trade vessel in late 1780s and early 1790s; British but registered as Portuguese to illegal evade East India Company trade monopoly.
SS Isaac Todd											
Isabella		William Heath Davis, Captain Tyler	209 tons.			United States	Boardman and Pope, Boston.	1809 left Boston, 1810 in Sitka, then to California with hunting party of Aleuts, 48 baidarkas, and a Russian overseer; in California 1810–1811, then Sitka; 1812 several trips between Hawaii and Canton. From 1812 to 1816 made several voyages between Hawaii, Northwest Coast, and California.	1810-?		1809 maritime fur trade voyage to California with Northwest Coast native labor from Sitka. Crewman Caleb Reynolds (on board 1809–1812) wrote account in his "Notebook" of a visit to a hot springs near Sitka, 1811. Possibly sold to Russians in 1814, but soon in American hands again. Possibly the same ship later purchased by the HBC in 1829.
Isabella				195 tons		Britain	HBC	Purchased by HBC 1829.		Lost 1830.	HBC ship used for the PNW coast trade.

== J ==
Ship	Other names	Captain(s)	Type	Tons	Draft	Registry (flag)	Owner(s)	Events/locations	Dates in BC	Demise	Comments
Jackal	Jackall	Alexander Stewart, William Brown	sloop	86		Britain	Priestly	Maritime fur trading in 1790s			Part of the "Butterworth squadron", including Butterworth and Prince Lee Boo
Jane		Elias Newbury or Nordbery.	Schooner	72 tons.		United States	Ebenezer Dorr (formerly mate of Hope and later captain of Otter)	1792, registered in Boston for maritime fur trade voyage; 1793 at Haida Gwaii, 1794 at Canton; returned to Boston August 1794.	1793		Built 1787 at Newburyport. Captain Nordbery commanded another Dorr vessel, the Despatch, in 1794, during which voyage he was killed by Haida Chief Altadsee.
Jefferson		Captain Josiah Roberts	ship	145 tons.		United States	Josiah Roberts (captain), Bernard Magee (first mate), Russell Sturgis, and 8 other Boston merchants.	1791 left Boston; 1792 collected 13,000 seal pelts off Chile coast; then to Marquesas where small schooner, Resolution, was built to act as tender (under Mr. Burling, later captured and destroyed in Haida Gwaii). On Northwest Coast, 1793–94, mostly between Nootka Sound and Clayoquot Sound, and Haida Gwaii; wintered in Clayoquot Sound; to Canton in late 1794; return to Boston 1795.	1793-1794	Lost at Cape of Good Hope sometime after 1795.	Built 1791 at Newburyport for Northwest Coast maritime fur trade. After 1791-95 voyage changed ownership. Bernard Magee's log survives, owned by Massachusetts Historical Society; Magee is very critical of John Meares's chart and descriptions of coast. Captain Roberts claimed to have discovered the Marquesas Islands (naming them "Washington's Islands").
Jenny		James Baker (1st voyage), J.W. Adamson (2nd voyage)	schooner	78 tons		Britain	Sidenham Teast	1st voyage: In Columbia River, 1792, met Broughton of Chatham there; also at Nootka. 2nd voyage: Columbia River, elsewhere; little known, lost at sea?	1791 (1st voyage), 1794-1795 (2nd voyage)	Lost at sea?	
Jenny (II)		Captain Bowers (1st and 2nd voyages), Captain Crocker (3rd)	205 tons.			United States	Ebenezer Dorr and sons.	1797 left Boston; 1798 on Northwest Coast; 1799 in Boston; 1800 on NW Coast, then Canton; 1801 in Boston. 1802 on NW Coast, then Hawaii and Canton; 1803 in Europe, then Boston.	1798 (1st voyage), 1800 (2nd), 1802 (3rd).		Built in New York City. Made three maritime fur trade voyages to Northwest Coast. In Antwerp, 1803, Madame Bonaparte visited the vessel.
John Bright										wrecked near Clo-oose	inconclusive piracy & murder investigation
Joseph Peabody		Joseph Moore	brig	225 tons.		United States		Left New York in 1835, on Northwest Coast 1836, causing the Hudson's Bay Company annoyance, as they were trying to drive the Americans away. Also cruised California. In 1837 arrived in Canton, via Hawaii; returned to New York later in 1837.	1836		One of the last US maritime fur trade vessels to cruise the Northwest Coast. Named for a prominent Salem merchant.
Juno (merchant ship)		John Kendrick Jr (might have been in command by end of 1st voyage), Captain Gibbs (master, 1st voyage), John D'Wolf (or De Wolf, 2nd voyage)		206 tons.		United States, Russia	George D'Wolf (or De Wolf) and John D'Wolf (2nd voyage)	1801 sailed from Bristol, Rhode Island; 1802–1803 on Northwest Coast. March 1803, tried unsuccessfully to rescue survivors of the Boston in Nootka Sound; 1804 in Canton; 1805 on Northwest Coast; October 1805, sold to Russians; continued to cruise Northwest Coast under Russian flag with Aleut hunters. May 1810, harassed by Haida; Captain Samuel Hill of the Otter was accused of instigating the harassment.	1802-1803, 1805	Lost at sea, November 1811.	Two maritime fur trade voyages to Northwest Coast. After selling Juno to Russians in 1805, crew and furs sent to Canton, John D'Wolf travelled in small Russian vessel to Kamchatka then overland 5,500 miles to St. Petersburg. D'Wolf was Herman Melville's uncle and is mentioned in Moby-Dick and Redburn.

== K ==
Ship	Other names	Captain(s)	Type	Tons	Draft	Registry (flag)	Owner(s)	Events/locations	Dates in BC	Demise	Comments
Katherine	Catherine	Bazilla Worth (1st voyage), William Blanchard (3rd voyage)	ship	287 tons.		United States	Boardman and Pope (3rd voyage)	1800 left Boston, 1801 on Northwest Coast; wintered in Hawaii; 1802 on Northwest Coast; late 1802 in Canton with cargo of 500 sea otter and 1,700 seal skins. 1803 in Boston. 1804 left Boston for Northwest Coast, no record of being on Northwest Coast but was in Canton in autumns of 1805 and 1806. Left Boston 1809; 1810 in California, Northwest Coast; 1811 in Sitka; 1812 active in California, then returned to Sitka, then sailed for Canton. Unknown if ship returned to Boston.	1801-1802, maybe 1805, 1810-1812	Possibly lost in 1812–1813.	Built in Braintree in or shortly before 1800. Used in maritime fur trade and sealing. In 1811-1812 took some Russians and Aleut hunters with 50 baidarkas to California and returned them to Sitka, sharing profits with Baranoff of Russian-American Company. Also sold $10,000 worth of English textiles to RAC.
King George		Nathaniel Portlock		320 tons, crew of 59.		Britain	King George's Sound Company	1786-87, Maritime Fur Trade in Pacific Northwest with Queen Charlotte under George Dixon			Third ship to visit Hawaii, in 1786; after the two ships under Cook, 1778.
Kingfisher		Capt. Stephenson	sloop					three crew & captain massacred by Ahousaht Nuu-chah-nulth, 1864			punitive expedition by HMS Sutlej and HMS Devastation destroys eight villages
Komagata Maru			steam liner			Japan		blockade of East Indian immigration, Vancouver	1914		
Kootenai			sternwheeler			Japan		CPR construction	1880s		service was from Northport, Washington to Farwell (Revelstoke, British Columbia)

== L ==
Ship	Other names	Captain(s)	Type	Tons	Draft	Registry (flag)	Owner(s)	Events/locations	Dates in BC	Demise	Comments
La Flavie											
La Solide											
La Plata						Spain					
Labouchere		John Swanson, W.A. Mouat	paddle steamer			Great Britain	Hudson's Bay Company			sank off Point Reyes, California, on April 15, 1866, with the loss of two lives	
Lady of the Lake			Sail			None	William J. Smith	Operated on Atlin Lake.	by 1904 until 1908	Retired in 1908.	Built by 1904.
Lady of the Lake						Great Britain		Fraser Canyon Gold Rush, Douglas Road			
Lady Washington	Washington	Robert Gray (to 1789), John Kendrick (1789-1794), Roger Simpson (1794-1795), Captain Reid (1796-?)	sloop, refitted as brig	90 tons		U.S.	Consortium of Boston merchants. Kendrick after 1789 (apparently illegally); John Howel after Kendrick's death in 1794.	1787 left Boston with Columbia; on Northwest Coast 1788, wintered at Nootka Sound; in July 1789 all furs of both vessels put on Columbia and Gray and Kendrick exchanged commands; Gray took Columbia to Canton and Boston while Kendrick assumed ownership of Lady Washington. In China 1790. In 1791 to Northwest Coast via Japan. In July 1791 Haida at Ninstints (Koyah's Harbor) tried to capture vessel in revenge for an earlier incident involving Kendrick. 1791–1796, several trips between Hawaii, Canton, and NW Coast, pioneering the Hawaii sandalwood trade. December 1794 Kendrick killed by a salute from the British Jackal. After 1796 operated between Canton and Batavia for Dutch agents.	1788-1794	foundered in the Philippines in 1797	Consort of the Columbia Rediviva. First US ship known to clear from port for the Northwest Coast.
LaGrange		B.F. Snow	Barque	259 tons.		United States	Salem merchants.	On Northwest Coast in 1834; then Hawaii and Canton with cargo of lumber and furs from NW Coast. At NW Coast and Hawaii 1836–1837. In 1849 took prospectors from Salem, Massachusetts, to California Gold Rush. Sold in California.	1834, 1836		Built in Portsmouth, New Hampshire. One of the last American maritime fur trade vessels on Northwest Coast, irritating Hudson's Bay Company. Crew of 11 men (in 1836). Salem owners memorialized vessel with full-rigged model now in Peabody Essex Museum.
SS Langley											
SS Lama				150 tons		Britain	HBC	Launched 1826, purchased by HBC 1831.		Sold 1837.	HBC ship used for the PNW coast trade.
Lama		John Bancroft	brig	145 tons.		United States	Eliab Grimes (owner or "manager").	Early career unclear; 1838, sailed between Hawaii and California. Late 1838 took crew of Kaigani Haida to hunt sea otters in California. Haida mutinied, Bancroft killed, Haida left ship and took furs north in their kayaks.	1838		Maritime fur trade. Adele Ogden wrote about the mutiny.
Lapwing		probably Andrew Blanchard (captain), William Blanchard (mate); then Russian captain and crew.	Brig	176 tons.		United States, Russia	Nathaniel Dorr, William Blanchard, and others. Sold in Russians in Sitka.	1824 left Boston; 1825 at Sitka sold to Russians. July 1825 at Honolulu with Russian crew; February 1826 at Canton.	1825		Built in Scituate, Massachusetts in 1822. Maritime fur trade voyage 1824–1825. Sold to Russians who used vessel for fur trade.
Lascar		James Harris (former first mate of Borneo)	Brig	217 tons.		United States	John Bryant, Lemuel Porter, William Sturgis, John Suter.	1820 left Boston, 1821–24 on Northwest Coast, wintering in Hawaii; November 1824 in Hawaii; 1825 in Canton; August 1825 in Boston. Sold in 1825.	1821-1824		Built 1817 in Medford. 1820 maritime fur trade voyage. Repeatedly met Rob Roy, Mentor, Hamilton, and Arab at Haida Gwaii or coasts to north and east. Reports of cruelty by Captain Harris caused owners to have their "greatest lawyer" bring charges against him (result unknown).
SS Lausanne											
Lelia Byrd		William Shaler	Brig	175 tons.		United States	William Shaler (captain) and Richard J. Cleveland of Salem, Massachusetts.	August 1803 sailed from Canton to Northwest Coast; 1804 on NW Coast; failed to cross Columbia Bar over 8 days of trying; visited California; 1805 in Hawaii.	1804		Registered in Portsmouth, Virginia. In 1805 sold to King Kamehameha in exchange for, in part, the smaller Hawaiian-built schooner Tamana.
SS Leviathan											
SS Lillooet			survey ship								
Litteler	Littillar, Latitia, Little Lar	Jonathan Dorr	brig	110 tons.		United States (Boston)	John Dorr and Ebenezer Dorr Jr. of Boston	1800 left Boston; 1801 on NW Coast; January 1802 in Canton; arrive at Boston July 1802.	1801		Built 1797 in Virginia. Made one maritime fur trade voyage 1800–1802.
Loriot		Captain Nye (1835). Captain Bancroft (1837). Lieut. Lieut. William A. Slacum.	Schooner; brig after 1833	92 tons.		U.S.		Early career unclear; July 1833 sold in Oahu; 1835-1836 cruised between Hawaii, California, and NW Coast; 1836 tried to acquire Alaska Natives as contract hunters in California, boarded and driven from Alaska (Dall Island) by Imperial Russian Navy; 1837 on NW Coast, California, Hawaii.	1836-1837		Built 1828 in Plymouth for maritime fur trade. In 1835, crew of ten described as almost entirely Native Hawaiian plus American officers. In 1836 American Consul wrote to US Secretary of State John Forsyth to protest the Russian Navy forcing vessel from Dall Island, saying that Tattisky (Datzkoo Harbour) was not in Russian territory and that the act ruined the ship's venture.
Louisa		William Martain (formerly of the Hamilton); James Lambert (after 1829)	ship	222 tons		United States (Boston)		October 1826 left Boston; 1827–28 on Northwest Coast, wintered on coast. Ownership changed in Hawaii, 1828 or 1829.	1827-1828		Maritime fur trade. Sailed with consort Active, Captain William Cotting. In 1828 Captain Martain wrote the owners that the Northwest trade was "ruined", with furs dwindling in quantity and quality, prices on coast rising while fur prices falling in Canton.
Lucy		Joseph Pierpont (formerly of the Sally, c. 1796)				United States	Dorr	On Northwest Coast 1801; at Tattisky (south end Dall Island), May 1801; left for China, June 1801; Canton in November 1801; Boston return May 1802.	1801		Little known; spent apparently made just one maritime fur trade voyage.
Lummi 3	Renfrew, Friendship	Horace Tattersol(s)	Commercial	47	6′11″	Canadian	Edward Pieters/Paula Matthei(s)	Constructed by Lummi Bay Packers by George Wrang in 1919/Bellingham, WA/ San Diego, CA	1919 - 1956	Currently in San Diego, CA	Constructed for transportation to BC and Alaskan canneries
Lydia (brig) (I)		Samuel Hill	brig	180 tons.		United States	Theodore Lyman, other Boston merchants.	1804 left Boston for maritime fur trade; 1805 on Northwest Coast; July 1805 Nootka Sound, rescued John Jewitt and John Thompson (survivors of the Boston); cruised to Alaska, then to Columbia River where a letter left with natives by Lewis and Clark was taken and forwarded from Canton to Philadelphia; November 1806 at Canton; May 1807 back in Boston.	1805-1806		Two surviving supercargo logs describe Captain Hill as an unstable tyrant. In 1805 assisted Atahualpa after attack by Heiltsuk or Tsimshian at Milbanke Sound. Some logs and journals by members of Lydia and Atahualpa survive. May be the same brig as Lydia (II).
Lydia (II)	Il’mena (renamed by Russians)	Thomas Brown; James Bennett; Captain Wadsworth (after Russian purchase)	brig	90 tons		United States (Boston); Russia	James & Thomas Handasyd Perkins	April 1809 left Boston for maritime fur trade; 1810–13 on Northwest Coast, trading continuously; Fall 1813 fur cargo transferred to Atahualpa; late 1813 to Hawaii; sold with Atahualpa to Russians for 20,000 sealskins; 1814 left Sitka under Russian command to collect furs in California.	1810-1814		In 1810 rescued/ransomed survivors of Russian St. Nicholas which had wrecked in Makah territory in 1808. May be the same brig as Lydia (I) (tonnage possibly in error), or Lydia (III).
Lydia (schooner) (III)		Captain Lucatt or Lacaat (1813); Henry Gyzelaar (1815)	Schooner	90 tons		U.S. (Philadelphia). Kingdom of Hawaii	Philadelphia China Traders Benjamin C. Wilcocks and James Smith Wilcocks. King Kaumualii after 1816.	Early career unclear; 1813 arrived at Macau from NW Coast and Marquesas Islands; 1815 at Canton, leaving with cargo for Sitka; September 1815 at Sitka. In Sitka Captain Gyzelaar joined Captain William Smith of the Albatross for illegal venture to California coast; December 1815 left Sitka for California; January 1816 both Lydia and Albatross seized by Spanish and crews imprisoned but eventually released.	1813, 1816	May be the same vessel as Lydia (II). Involved in Maritime Fur Trade, California Hide Trade, sealing, and poaching. In 1816 sold with Albatross to kings of Hawaii. Albatross went to Kamehameha I in March, 1816; Lydia to Kaumualii in October.	

== M ==
Ship	Other names	Captain(s)	Type	Tons	Draft	Registry (flag)	Owner(s)	Events/locations	Dates in BC	Demise	Comments
Manchester		John Brice	Ship	285 tons		United States	Philadelphia merchants	October 1800 sailed from Bristol, Rhode Island for maritime fur trade; 1801–02 on Northwest Coast; 1802 to Canton, then sailed for Philadelphia.	1801-1802		At Nootka Sound, 1801, seven of the crew deserted only to be captured and killed by Nuu-chah-nulth of Chief Maquinna.
Maple Leaf (schooner)	Parma (1938–1978)	Alexander Maclaren (1904–1938); Harold Helland (1938–1978); Brian Falconer (1980–2001); Kevin Smith (2001–present)	Schooner	92 tons	10 ft	Canada	Maple Leaf Adventures	Launched in Vancouver in 1904; raced under sail until 1906; converted to a halibut longliner in 1930s; restored and relaunched in 1980s–90s; now operates as an expedition cruise vessel along the coasts of BC and Alaska.	1904–present	Still active	Built in 1904 in Vancouver. Designated a Canadian Heritage vessel.
Margaret (1791 ship)		James Magee, David Lamb		161 tons.		United States	J. & T. Lamb, Thomas Handasyd Perkins, Russell Sturgis, James Magee, other Boston investors.	Late 1791 left Boston; April 1792 arrived at Haida Gwaii, quickly collected about 1,200 sea otter pelts and left for China via Hawaii; December 1792 at Canton; 1793 return to Northwest Coast, with tender collected over 3,000 pelts; late 1793 sailed for Hawaii and China, then Boston; 1794 in Boston; sold to new owners, wrecked soon after.	1792-1793	Wrecked near Marblehead, Massachusetts, c. 1795.	Built in Boston, 1791. Among the earliest US maritime fur trade ventures. Party left at Nootka Sound over winter of 1792–93, finished building a smaller tender by the time Margaret returned. James Magee brought a large collection of Northwest Coast "curiosities" to Boston, most now in Peabody Museum.
SS Marquis of Bute											
SS Marsella											
SS Marten		William Alexander Mouat									
Mary		William Bowles (died at sea), J. Gray (1st voyage); E. Prescott (2nd voyage)	Ship	209 tons.		United States	J. Gray (1st voyage); Samuel and Sylvanus Gray (2nd voyage)	July 1802 left New England; 1803 on Northwest Coast; March 1803 unsuccessfully tried, with Juno, to rescue survivors of Boston at Nootka Sound; Nov 1803 at Canton; May 1804 back in New England. In 1805 on Northwest Coast, cruising between Sitka and Vancouver Island; December 1805 in Canton; 1806 left for Boston, wrecked en route.	1803, 1805	Wrecked in 1806 on voyage from Canton to Boston.	Built in Salem, 1801. Two maritime fur trade voyages.
SS Mary Dare	April 11, 1842 Built under the name 'Brisies'	[Cooper] [William Alexander Mouat]	Brig later converted to Brigantine at Robinson's ship yard Honolulu	148	12 feet	British	1)Captain Robert Hatson Dare, 2)Hudson's Bay Company,3) John Pratt & Co		May 7, 1842 resurveyed at London renamed 'Mary Dare'.	December 16, 1857 "The MARY DARE of Wivenhoe, [Captain] Taylor, from Seaham to London with coals, was in contact off Huntcliffe Fort yesterday morning with the ADONIS, [Captain] Goodwin, from London to Hartlepool, had her foremast carried away and shortly after went down;	
USS Massachusetts		Lt. Richard W. Meade	screw steamer	765	4.6 m (15 ft)	US	US Navy	Puget Sound War	1855-1856	gutted of engines and converted to a bark used as a storeship, and renamed Farallones, in 1863. Sold off in 1867.	One crewman was the first US sailor to die in action in the Pacific Northwest
SS Maurelle								Douglas Road, Fraser Canyon Gold Rush, Lillooet Lake			
McConnell			sternwheeler, two 16ʺ x 72ʺ cyl.	729		Canada #107152	Canadian Pacific Ry. (1898-1901); White Pass & Yukon Route (1901)	Operated between Wrangell, Alaska and points on the Stikine River in 1898.	1898 only	Broken up in 1901. Hull sold to Adair Bros.	Built in 1898 by the C.P. Ry. at Vancouver, B.C. Not used under W.P.&Y.R. ownership.
SS Meg Merrilies		Capt. Pamphlet	schooner					Took loggers and oxen to log at Port Neville, B.C. Transported coal between Nanaimo, BC and Victoria.	1864, 1865		
Mentor		John Suter (1st voyage), Lemuel Porter (2nd voyage), George Newell (3rd voyage), Stephen Hersey (end of 3rd voyage)	Ship	213 tons.		US	John Bryant, William Sturgis, John Suter (1st voyage), Lemuel Porter (2nd voyage).	1817-18 on Northwest Coast; 1819 in Canton (via Hawaii); 1819 return to Boston with over 2,000 chests of tea and other Chinese goods. Sept 1819 left Boston; 1820–21 on Northwest Coast mostly around Haida Gwaii, wintered on coast. August 1821 sailed for Hawaii and Canton; May 1822 in Boston. June 1822 left Boston with plan to coordinate with Lascar, Rob Roy, and Ann; 1823 at Hawaii, then on Northwest Coast, then Honolulu. Sept 1823 sailed to California, sold remaining goods to Russians at Bodega Bay; 1823-25 two trips between California and Canton	1820-1825		Built in Salem, 1812, for maritime fur trade. Three voyages to Northwest Coast. Pioneered California Trade for Bryant & Sturgis. In 1825 Captain Newell left to command the Nile; Captain Hersey took Mentor, whose vessel, Ann was sold to Russians in California. In April 1825 stopped at Saint Helena to quell a mutiny on board.
Mercury	See Gustavus III (ship), also spelled Gustaf III	John Henry Cox, Thomas Barnett	brig or snow; 16 guns.	152 tons.		Britain (also sailed under Sweden and US flags)	John Henry Cox	Two or three visits to Northwest Coast, first in 1789, then in 1791-92 under Swedish flag. During Russo-Swedish War (1788–1790) Cox offered Sweden service as a privateer, receiving royal charter and renaming vessel to Gustavus III. Approached Unalaska in 1789, instead was friendly, traded on NW Coast, then sailed to Saipan and Canton. Cox died in 1791 at Canton.	1789, 1791–92		Later Gustavus III under Swedish flag. 16-guns.
Mercury (I)		William Barnett, Mr. Gardin	Brigantine or snow	81 tons, under 60 feet in length.		United States	John Francis and John Brown of Providence, Rhode Island.	1795 arrived at Nootka Sound, Northwest Coast, via Falkland Islands, Australia, and Hawaii. Many crewmen deserted in Hawaii; Captain Barnett took crew of Native Hawaiians by force. Late 1795 sailed to Canton, returning Hawaiians en route.	1795		Built in Providence, Rhode Island, 1785. Made one maritime fur trade voyage. At some point Captain Barnett was killed and Mr. Gardin, supercargo, took command.
Mercury (merchant ship) (II)		William Heath Davis (father of William Heath Davis Jr.), George Washington Eayrs (or Ayres)	Ship	145 tons.		United States	Boston merchants	In 1806 sailed from Boston to Northwest Coast. Summer 1806 encountered Boston vessels Pearl and Peacock in Hecate Strait. 1806-07 cruised California coast; late 1807 at Canton; 1808 returned to NW Coast via Kodiak Island, cruised to San Francisco via Haida Gwaii and Columbia River. Cruised California waters, 1808–9. June 1809 to 1813 repeatedly sailed between California and Alaska. In Canton, early 1811, Eayrs sold furs of his own and on behalf of Governor Baranov. On 2 June 1813 seized by Spanish near Monterey, California as a privateer.	1806-1813		Made one of the most prolonged voyages of the maritime fur trade. In 1808 transported Kodiak Alutiiq hunters, 25 baidarkas, and RAC overseer Shvetsov from Kodiak to California, along with some natives kidnapped on Vancouver Island or Olympic Peninsula. Eayrs and crew arrested by Spanish in 1813.
SS Mexican											
Mexicana		Cayetano Valdés y Flores	goleta (schooner and brig)	46 foot long (43 foot on the keel), 12-foot (3.7 m) beam, 33 "toneladas" burden, complement of 21 men		Spain	Spanish Navy		Built 1791 in San Blas. Explores Vancouver Island 1792.		Sister ship of Sutil
SS Milton Badger											
Mono			sternwheeler, two 10ʺ x 74ʺ cyl.	278		Canada #107102	Teslin Transportation Co.	Operated on the Stikine River in 1898.	1898	Destroyed by fire (arson) near Dawson City, Yukon in 1902.	Built in 1898 by Frank P. Armstrong and A. F. Henderson on the Stikine River.
Mount Royal		SB Johnson	sternwheeler			Canada	Hudson's Bay Company	Built Albion Iron Works (VMD) Victoria	1902-1907	Wrecked in Kitselas Canyon, six lives lost	
SS Moyie			sternwwheeler			Canada	Canadian Pacific Railway and in 1957, Kootenay Lake Historical Society	after a nearly 60-year career, was the last passenger sternwheeler to operate in Canada	launched October 22, 1898. taken out of service April 27, 1957	berthed and restored at Kaslo, now a National historic site	World's oldest surviving intact passenger sternwheeler
SS Mumford							Collins Overland Telegraph				

== N ==
Ship	Other names	Captain(s)	Type	Tons	Draft	Registry (flag)	Owner(s)	Events/locations	Dates in BC	Demise	Comments
SS Nanaimo Packet											
SS Nancy											
MV Nechacco	Chilco	John Bonser George Ritchie	sternwheeler	Gross 129 Registered 76		Canada	Fort George Lumber and Navigation Company		launched May 25, 1909, at Quesnel	Tore apart in ice jam at Cottonwood Canyon April 1911	First sternwheeler to navigate the Grand Canyon of the Fraser
Nellie			Sail	5		Canada #107638	Thomas H. Worsnop	Operated on Atlin Lake.	1898-191_	Registry closed in 1916.	Built in 1898 at Seattle, Washington.
SS Nereide			Ship, 10 guns, 26 men	253 tons.		Britain	HBC	Launched 1821, purchased by HBC 1833.		Sold 1840.	HBC ship used for the PNW coast trade.
New Hazard (ship)		David Nye		281 tons.		United States	John Derby and consortium of Massachusetts merchants	Left Boston 1810; 1811–1812 on Northwest Coast; Sept 1812 to Hawaii and Canton. Returned to New England via Hawaii, 1813, evading British naval forces involved in War of 1812.	1811-1812	Wrecked on Galloper Sands on English coast in 1817.	Built 1809 in Newburyport for maritime fur trade. Sister ship of the Packet. Captain Nye known for being vicious, flogging men, slaving, attacking native communities, etc.
Nootka		John Meares	snow	200 tons, crew of 50		Britain	Bengal Fur Company (John Henry Cox, Meares and others)	1786, sailed from Calcutta to Alaska. Wintered Prince William Sound, trapped in ice; 23 men die. May 1787, rescued by George Dixon of the Queen Charlotte. October 1787, arrived at Macau.	1786-1787		Sailed without licences from the East India Company and South Sea Company. Consort of the Sea Otter under Captain Tipping; sometimes sailed together.
Norgold			35 H.P. gasoline-screw	6		None	Norgold Mines, Ltd. (1934-1935); Bobjo Mines (1935-1937); White Pass & Yukon Route (1937-1952); A. E. Prince (1952-19__); Canadian Park Service (19__-present)	Operated on Tagish Lake, 1934–1937. Operated on Atlin Lake, 1937–1950.	1934-1950	Hull is hopelessly rotted.	Built in 1934 by Boeing Aircraft of Canada, Ltd. at Vancouver, B.C.
Norman Morrison											
North West America		Robert Funter	sloop or schooner	About 40-50 tons		Britain	John Meares and partners	First non-indigenous ship built in Pacific Northwest; captured by Spain during Nootka Crisis, renamed Santa Gertrudis la Magna and later Santa Saturnina	Launched September 20, 1788		

== O ==
Ship	Other names	Captain(s)	Type	Tons	Draft	Registry (flag)	Owner(s)	Events/locations	Dates in BC	Demise	Comments
O'Cain		Joseph O'Cain (1st voyage), Jonathan Winship Jr. (2nd & 3rd voyages), Robert McNeill (c. 1816)		280 tons		United States	Winship family of Brighton, Massachusetts	1803 at Kodiak Island, made deal with RAC Governor Baranov, transported 40 Aleuts, 20 baidarkas, and RAC overseer Shvetsov to California. June 1804 in Sitka; Dec 1804 in Canton; Boston in 1805. In 1806 at Sitka, took over 120 Aleuts and 75 baidarkas to California; 1807 at Sitka; 1808 in Canton, then Boston. Late 1809 in Sitka, then Haida Gwaii, then again took Aleuts to California. 1812-1816 several trips between California, Canton, Hawaii, and NW Coast. Late 1816 in Canton; 1817 in Boston. Made at least one more voyage to NW Coast.	1803-1804, 1806–1807, 1809–1816	Sank off Cape Horn, with no survivors, probably in 1822.	Captain O'Cain pioneered the practice of bringing native labor from Alaska to California to hunt sea otters (despite Spanish prohibition). Made several maritime fur trade voyages. Stayed in Pacific during War of 1812 to avoid Royal Navy.
Ogilvie			sternwheeler, two 16ʺ x 72ʺ cyl.	742		Canada #107148	Canadian Pacific Ry. (1898-1901); White Pass & Yukon Route (1901)	Operated between Wrangell, Alaska and points on the Stikine River in 1898.	1898 only	Broken up in 1901. Hull sold to Adair Bros.	Built in 1898 by the C.P. Ry. Not used under W.P.&Y.R. ownership.
Omineca			sternwheeler, two 16ʺ x 72ʺ cyl.	583		Canada #126248	Foley, Welch and Stewart (1909-1916); Alaskan Engineering Commission (from 1916)	Used on the Skeena River for construction of the Grand Trunk Pacific Ry. (1909-1914); used on the Susitna River and the Cook Inlet to ship supplies for construction of The Alaska Railroad (1916-1917)	1909-1916	between 1923 & 1930	Built in 1909 at Victoria, B.C. by Alexander Watson Jr. Retired at the end of 1917.
MV Operator		Con Myers	sternwheeler	gross 698 registered 439		Canada	Foley, Welch and Stewart		Launched on Skeena River in 1909, Fraser River in 1912	Retired at Fort George	Worked on both GTP and PGE rail construction
Orcasitas	see Adventure										
Orel	see Chernui Orel					Russia					
Orizaba						Spain					
SS Orpheus						U.S.		Sinking of SS Pacific		wrecked on Cape Beale	
Otter		William Alexander Mouat				United KingdomBritain	HBC				
Otter (I)		Ebenezer Dorr		168 tons		United States	Dorr family	August 1795 left Boston; early 1796 at Sydney, Australia, took Thomas Muir and other escaped political prisoners on board. In 1796 cruised Northwest Coast. Late 1796 in California. 1797 in Hawaii, then Canton. December 1797 at Portland, Maine. Sold to new owners.	1796	Captured by French and lost in 1798.	Built in Amesbury, Massachusetts. Maritime fur trade. In October 1796 Dorr begged Spanish Governor of California for supplies, especially food, which was given. Against Spanish wishes Dorr left ten of his crew and an Australian woman in California.
Otter (II)		Samuel Hill	brig	238 tons		United States		In 1809 sailed to Hawaii, then to Northwest Coast, trading until 1811, then to Canton and back to Boston. Captain Hill incited several violent conflicts. One with the Russian captain Benzemann of Juno and some Haida and Aleuts. Another in a battle with the Chilkat Tlingit, during which 2nd mate Robert Kemp was killed.	1809–1811		Built in Newburyport, Massachusetts in 1806. Armed with ten cannon. Maritime fur trade.
Owhyhee		William Henry McNeill, Eliab (or Eliah) Grimes, John Kelly, John Dominis	Brig	166 tons, 96 feet in length.		US	Josiah Marshall & Dixey Wildes, Boston	1821 in Hawaii; 1822 on Northwest Coast, in December in Hawaii with only 150 furs; 1823 to California; late 1823 left Monterey for NW Coast, trading through winter; July 1824 at Haida Gwaii; 1826 sailed between Hawaii and California. January 1827 in Oahu, then northern NW Coast, Columbia River, Bodega Bay, return to Hawaii, then to Canton. In 1828 returned to Boston. 1829–1830 on NW Coast, then Hawaii and direct to Boston, arriving 1831.	1822-1830		Built in Boston in 1821 for Maritime Fur Trade. Otter trade dwindling, explored diversification; brought cargo of pickled Pacific salmon to Boston. Native oral tradition near Fort Vancouver says the Owhyhee and Convoy brought the fever sickness of the 1829-1830 winter.

== P ==
Ship	Other names	Captain(s)	Type	Tons	Draft	Registry (flag)	Owner(s)	Events/locations	Dates in BC	Demise	Comments
SS Pacific						U.S.		collision with SS Orpheus off Cape Flattery		sunk, 300 or more lost, 2 survivors	
Packet		Daniel C. Bacon		281 tons		United States	John Derby and consortium of Salem merchants.	1812-1813 on Northwest Coast, often at Haida Gwaii. November 1814 sailed for Hawaii and Canton. January 1816 in Boston.	1812-1814		Built at Newbury in 1810. Sister ship of New Hazard. Made one Maritime fur trade voyage; afterward switched to Indonesian spice trade.
Palerma											
SS Pallas											
Panther		Isaiah Lewis	Brig	429 tons		United States	Salem merchants	1815 left Boston; 1816 in Hawaii, then Sitka; cruised Northwest Coast until fall 1817, then Canton; 1818 in Boston.	1816-1817		
Peacock		Oliver Kimball	Brig	108 tons		United States		1806 arrive in California via Hawaii; constantly pursued by Spanish, four crew arrested; October 1806 at Sitka; contracted with RAC Governor Baranov to transport Aleut hunters to California; 1807 at Bodega Bay; late 1807 return to Sitka, then to Canton.	1806-1807	Badly damaged in severe gale when sailing from China to Boston in 1808. Vessel condemned and sold at Batavia, Dutch East Indies, March 1, 1808.	Maritime fur trade
Pearl (I)		John Ebbets (1st voyage), John Suter (2nd voyage)		200 tons		United States	Boston firms: J. & T. Lamb (1st voyage), J. & T.H. Perkins (2nd voyage)	April 1805 at Nahwitti, Vancouver Island; cruised NW Coast until August 1806, then to Hawaii, Canton, and Boston. 1807 left Boston; 1808–1809 on NW Coast. December 1809 at Macau and Canton; 1810 returned to Boston.	1805-1806, 1808-1809		Made two maritime fur trade voyages. Second voyage brought 6,000 sea otter pelts to Macau, the largest cargo recorded for any voyage.
Pearl (II)		Samuel Chandler, Mr. Stevens	brig			United States	Boston merchants	1822 left Boston for Hawaii, then Sitka. On Northwest Coast about a month before being ordered to leave by Russians. Returned to Hawaii, where Stevens wrote to American Consul John C. Jones, who wrote to Secretary of State John Quincy Adams. In 1823 sailed back to Boston.	1822		Maritime fur trade voyage. Was the only ship ordered off NW Coast due to Russian Ukase of 1821.
Pedler (ship)	Pedlar	George Clark, Samuel Northrup, John Meek	Brig	224 tons		United States	Oliver Keating, Jonathan Amory, Thomas C. Amory, consortium of merchants. Sold to John Jacob Astor in 1814.	1811 sailed to Northwest Coast; 1812-1814 cruised coast between Vancouver Island and Aleutian Islands. Early 1814, in Hawaii, sold to Pacific Fur Company (PFC). Sailed to Fort Astoria, was taking cargo to Sitka, Alaska when PFC collapsed. Took goods from Sitka to California for Fort Ross. Captured by Spanish in California, ordered to leave. Early 1815 in Sitka. July 1816 seized by Russians for illegal trading, released in October. Sailed to Hawaii, Canton, Europe; October 1816 in New York City. 1819 sailed for NW Coast. 1820 in Hawaii, then Sitka; wintered in Hawaii; 1821 cruised NW Coast between Nahwitti and Haida Gwaii. August, left for Hawaii and Canton. 1822 on NW Coast again, then Hawaii and Canton; 1823 in New York.	1812-1815, 1820-1822		Built 1806 in Medford, Massachusetts. Maritime fur trade voyages. Sold in early 1814, in Hawaii, to Wilson Price Hunt for John Jacob Astor's Pacific Fur Company, for use as a supply vessel for Fort Astoria. Hunt sailed with Pedlar 1814–1816. Pedlar seized by Spanish for illegal trading in California; seized by Russians for illegally selling munitions to Alaska Natives.
SS Petrel											
Phoenix		Hugh Moore (2nd voyage)	barque					Two voyages to PNW; wintered in Columbia River 1794–95; in 1795 to Haida Gwaii and Nootka; later seen in Hawaii by John Boit.	1792 (1st voyage), 1794-1795 (2nd voyage)		Phoenix, although of Bengal, was not an East Indiaman
Polly		Thomas Kilby	Snow	107 tons		United States	Abiel Winship and other Boston merchants.	1800 left Boston; 1801 on Northwest Coast, cruising between Dall Island, Haida Gwaii, and Nass River. June 1801 to Hawaii and Canton; back in Boston, May 1802.	1801		Maritime fur trade voyage.
SS Prince Albert											
SS Prince George											
Prince Lee Boo		Captain Sharp, Robert Gordon	sloop	56		Britain	Priestly	Maritime Fur Trader in 1790s			Part of the "Butterworth squadron", including Butterworth and Jackall. Served as tender to Butterworth
Prince of Wales		James Colnett, James Johnstone		171 tons, complement of 35 men, carried 14 cannons			King George's Sound Company and joint company with John Meares and partners	Maritime Fur Trade in the Pacific Northwest, late 1780s and early 1790s	Launched about 1752		Crew included Archibald Menzies
SS Prince of Wales								Fraser Canyon Gold Rush, Douglas Road, Lillooet Lake			
SS Prince Rupert					8 feet 6 inches (2.59 m)		GTP	Coastal passenger service, use as hospital ship	1910-1956	decommissioned	marooned on Ripple Rock in 1927 in near-disaster
SS Prince William Henry											
Princesa		Bodega y Quadra, Esteban José Martínez, Salvador Fidalgo, Jacinto Caamaño, others	corvette	189 tons burthen		Spain	Spanish Navy Dept. of San Blas	1779, sailed to Alaska under Bodega y Quadra. 1788, sailed to Alaska under Martínez. 1792 used to occupy Neah Bay.	late 18th and early 19th centuries		One of the primary warships of Spain's San Blas Naval Department. Heavily used for exploration of Pacific Northwest and supply of Alta California
Princess Royal	Princesa Real					Britain, Spain	King George's Sound Company, Spanish Navy Dept. of San Blas				Lloyd's Register, 1789, lists as a sloop of 60 tons (Old Measure), Class A1, Copper sheathed, single deck with beams, draft 8 ft. when laden, owners Etches & Co.
SS Princess Sophia				2,320 tons			Canadian Pacific			1918	
HMS Providence		1.William Bligh, 2.William R. Broughton	sixth rate frigate	420 tons		Britain	Royal Navy	second breadfruit expedition to Tahiti under Capt.William Bligh 1791–1793; exploration and survey of East Asia under Ltd. William R. Broughton 1795-1797	1791 - 1797	wrecked 1797 southwest of Okinawa	

== Q ==
Ship	Other names	Captain(s)	Type	Tons	Draft	Registry (flag)	Owner(s)	Events/locations	Dates in BC	Demise	Comments
Queen Charlotte		George Dixon		200 tons, crew of 33.		Britain	King George's Sound Company	1786-87, maritime fur trading in Pacific Northwest with King George under Nathaniel Portlock. Fourth ship to visit Hawaii, May 1786.	late 1780s		namesake of Queen Charlotte Islands
MV Quesnel	City of Quesnel	Donald Arthur Foster	sternwheeler	Gross 130 Registered 177		Canada	Telesphore Marion {Quesnel Merchant}		Launched in May 1909 at Quesnel	Wrecked at Fort George Canyon May 1921	Last sternwheeler on upper Fraser River

== R ==
Ship	Other names	Captain(s)	Type	Tons	Draft	Registry (flag)	Owner(s)	Events/locations	Dates in BC	Demise	Comments
SS Recovery											
Resolution		Mr. Burling	Schooner	90 tons		US	Captain Josiah Roberts of the Jefferson, other Boston investors	May 1793 arrived on Northwest Coast; cruised with Jefferson between Columbia River and Clayoquot Sound. March 1794 separated from Jefferson to collect furs. In late 1794 captured by Haida in Haida Gwaii, all crew killed save one.	1794	Captured and destroyed by Cumshewa Haida at Cumshewa Inlet, 1794	Built 1793 in Marquesas Islands as tender for maritime fur trade vessel Jefferson. Crew killed in Haida Gwaii included Solomon Kendrick, son of John Kendrick. The lone survivor was rescued by the Despatch.
Rob Roy		Daniel Cross	brig	201 tons		United States	John Bryant and William Sturgis, Lemuel Porter, John Suter.	1821 sailed from Boston to Northwest Coast via Hawaii; 1822 at Haida Gwaii; 1822-24 cruised NW Coast. 1824 in Hawaii, transferred furs to Mentor, then returned to NW Coast for 1825 season. Late 1825 to Hawaii and Canton. Returned to Boston; sold in 1827.	1822-1825	Lost off California coast, 4 November 1830.	Built 1821 in Boston for maritime fur trade.
MV Robert C Hammond			sternwheeler	Gross 250 Registered 158		Canada	Fort George Lake and River Transportation Company		Launched on May 22, 1913, at Central Fort George	Retired 1914	
SS Rosalind											
Rover		George Davidson	Schooner			United States	Dorr family, Boston	1799 left Boston; 1800 on Northwest Coast, collected 2,000 sea otter pelts. 1801 in Hawaii, then lost at sea en route to Canton.	1800	On 9 October 1801, lost at sea while sailing from Hawaii to Canton, China.	Maritime fur trade. Built in Georgetown, Massachusetts. Captain Davidson had sailed with Robert Gray on 2nd voyage of Columbia Rediviva.
SS Royal Charlie											
Ruby (merchant ship)		Charles Bishop	Ship	101		UK	Sidenham Teast	Sailed from Bristol, England, in 1794; reached PNW in 1795, visiting Columbia River, Clayoquot Sound, Cloak Bay, and elsewhere.	1795		Maritime fur trade. Armed with Eight 3-pound cannons, six half-pound swivel guns.
Ruth			sternwheeler, two 5ʺ x 20ʺ cyl.	52		Canada #107518	John Irving (1898-1899); Northern Lakes & Rivers Navigation Co. (1899-1900); Atlin Transportation Co. (1900-1902)	Operated on Tagish Lake, 1898–1899. Operated on Atlin Lake, 1900–1902.	1898-1902	Destroyed by fire on Atlin Lake in 1902.	Built in 1898 by James H. Calvert at Bennett, B.C.

== S ==
Ship	Other names	Captain(s)	Type	Tons	Draft	Registry (flag)	Owner(s)	Events/locations	Dates in BC	Demise	Comments
St. Roch		Henry Larsen				Canada	RCMP	First voyage through Northwest Passage			
San Carlos		Gonzalo López de Haro, Salvador Fidalgo, Francisco de Eliza, others	packet ship and storeship		72 foot long (keel), 22-foot (6.7 m) beam, 15-foot (4.6 m) draft, 16 four-pound cannons	Spain	Spanish Navy Dept. of San Blas	Reached Unalaska in 1788, under Haro.	late 18th to early 19th centuries		Carried a 28-foot (8.5 m) longboat. Also used in discovery of San Francisco Bay by Juan de Ayala. There were two packet ships named San Carlos operating out of San Blas, but not simultaneously.
Santa Gertrudis la Magna	Santa Gertrudis	José María Narváez	sloop or schooner	About 40-50 tons		Spain	Spanish Navy Dept. of San Blas	Was the North West America, captured during Nootka Crisis and renamed	Built 1788, captured by Spain in 1789, rebuilt in 1790 as Santa Saturnina		
Santa Saturnina	La Orcasitas, Horcasitas	José María Narváez, Juan Carrasco	schooner	32 tonales burden	32 foot 10 inch length, 11-foot-10-inch (3.61 m) beam, 5-foot (1.5 m) draft, 4 three-pound cannons. Carried 8 two-man oars and 20 days supply of food, complement of 22 men.	Spain	Spanish Navy Dept. of San Blas	Built in 1790 from the disassembled Santa Gertrudis	1790-91		36 feet long; beam of 12 feet; "drawing 5 feet of water"; equipped with 8 oars
Santa Saturnina		Alonso de Torres	"large warship"			Spain	Spanish Navy		Transferred from Peru to San Blas and Pacific Northwest in 1792		Crew in 1792 included naturalist José Moziño, who observed the Nuu-chah-nulth and recommended Spanish abandonment of Nootka Sound
Santiago		Juan Pérez, Bruno de Heceta, Bodega y Quadra				Spain	Spanish Navy Dept. of San Blas	1774, under Pérez, sailed to Pacific Northwest; 1775, under Heceta, found mouth of Columbia River			
USS Saranac			sloop of war (sail and sidewheel)	1463	depth of hold 26 ft 6 in (8.08 m); draft 17 ft 4 in (max.)	United States	US Navy			first steam vessel to fall prey to Ripple Rock, June 18, 1875	
Scotia		E. W. Spencer (1899); John McDonald (1911)	stern-wheeler, two 7½ʺ x 20ʺ cyl.	214 (100, 1898–1901)		Canada #107829	White Pass & Yukon Route (John Irving Nav. Co., 1898 only)	Operated on Atlin Lake, 1898–1917.	1898-1967	Demolished by fire, 1967.	Built by John Irving Navigation Co.
SS Sea Bird											namesake of Sea Bird Island near Agassiz
Sea Otter	Harmon	James Hanna	brig	60 tons, crew of 30		Britain	John Henry Cox and "friends connected with the East India Company	Conducted the first purely commercial Maritime Fur Trade voyage between the Pacific Northwest and China; first British ship to visit the Northwest Coast since Captain Cook.	1785		Hanna's two voyages were on different ships but both were named Sea Otter.
Sea Otter (II)		James Hanna	snow	120 tons, or 100 tons.		Britain		Under Hanna, sailed from Macau to Nootka Sound and explored Queen Charlotte Sound and Clayoquot Sound; returned to China in early 1787.	1786-1787		Hanna's two voyages were on different ships but both were named Sea Otter.
Sea Otter (III)		William Tipping	snow	100 tons		Britain	Bengal Fur Company (John Henry Cox, Meares and others)	Sailed from Calcutta, March 1786, surveyed coast of Japan, then went to Northwest Coast.	1786	Foundered during a storm in the Gulf of Alaska, 1786.	Consort of Nootka under Meares; sometimes sailed together. Not the same vessel as either Sea Otter previously under Hanna.
Sea Otter (IV)	Fairy	Stephen Hills (or Hill), William Bowles	Snow or brig			United Kingdom, United States	British owners, sold to Boston merchants James Magee, James Lamb, Russell Sturgis, Stephen Hills.	1792 in Canton, chartered by Captains Ingraham, Rogers, and Collidge to carry furs to Boston. 1794 in Canton, possibly after cruising Northwest Coast for British owners. 1795, sold to Boston owners, renamed Sea Otter, sailed to Boston. 1796–97 on Northwest Coast. Late 1796 in Canton; arrived in Boston July 1798.	1794? 1796-1797		Was British Fairy of Calcutta. Made several maritime fur trade voyages. In 1796 Captain Hills, Mr. Elliot (supercargo), and two sailors killed by Haida at Cumshewa. Officer James Rowan was later master of Eliza and captured the killers and arranged their execution. In Canton, 1797, sold furs for over $47,000; to Boston with various Chinese goods including 50,000 pounds of tea, 7,000 nankeen pieces, 100 sets of China ceramics, 300 tea sets, etc. Made a profit of ten times the original investment.
SS Sierra Nevada											
SS Sir James Douglas											
Skeena		Magar 1909-1911 Charles Seymour 1914-1925	sternwheeler			Canada	Grand Trunk Pacific Railway 1908-1914 Charles Seymour 1914-1925	Last sternwheeler on lower Fraser River	Launched in 1909,	sold and converted to barge in 1925	Delivered meat for Pat Burns
MV Skuzzy		Ausbury Insley and SR Smith	sternwheeler			Canada		Took 16 days to navigate 16 miles (26 km) of Fraser River from Hells Gate Canyon to Boston Bar	Launched on May 4, 1882, at Spuzzum		First sternwheeler to arrive in Lytton
Sonora		Juan Francisco de la Bodega y Quadra, Juan Manuel de Ayala (briefly)	schooner		37 feet (11 m) in length.	Spain	Spanish Navy Dept. of San Blas	1775, sailed to Alaska	1775		Crew complement of 16.
SS Sophia						U.S.		Inside Passage & passenger disaster during Klondike Gold Rush		sunk in Lynn Canal	
Sultan		Caleb Reynolds (1st voyage), George Clark (2nd voyage), Captain Allen (3rd voyage)	Ship	274 tons		U.S.	Boardman & Pope, Boston	1815 left Boston; 1816 arrived at Sitka, cruised Northwest Coast; 1817 to Hawaii, Marquesas, Sitka and California; 1818 to Chile and Marquesas; 1819 at Canton, then Boston. 1821 left Boston; 1822–23 on NW Coast. Late 1823 at Hawaii, then California and Mexico; 1824 at Hawaii then Canton; 1825 return to Boston. A third voyage visited Hawaii and possibly NW Coast.	1816-1817, 1822–1823, maybe 1826		Built 1815 at Charlestown, Boston. Made 2 or 3 maritime fur trade voyages to NW Coast.
Sumatra											
SS Surprise (I)											
Swell	Nautilus Swell	Captain George MacGregor (1912); Captain George Howell (1959)	Tugboat; later converted to passenger vessel	130 GT	88 feet (27 m) LOA; 19 feet (5.8 m) beam	Canada, official number 130882	Victoria Tug Company; Island Tug & Barge Ltd.; Maple Leaf Adventures	Commercial towing on the British Columbia coast; appeared in a 1974 episode of The Beachcombers; later converted for passenger service	1912–present	In active service	Built in 1912 at Beach Avenue Shipyard in Vancouver by Arthur Moscrop. Originally steam-powered; converted to diesel power in 1954.
SS Surprise (II)											
SS Susan Sturges											
Sutil		Dionisio Alcalá Galiano	goleta (brig)	46 foot long (43 foot on the keel), 12-foot (3.7 m) beam, 33 "toneladas" burden, complement of 20 men		Spain	Spanish Navy Dept. of San Blas		Built 1791 in San Blas		Sister ship of Mexicana
SS Sutil											
SS Swiss Boy											

== T ==
Ship	Other names	Captain(s)	Type	Tons	Draft	Registry (flag)	Owner(s)	Events/locations	Dates in BC	Demise	Comments
Tagish			Alcohol vapor screw			None	North-West Mounted Police (1899-1904); Royal Canadian Mounted Police (1904-1910); British Columbia Government (1908-19__)	Operated on Atlin Lake.	1899-19__	After 1908.	Built in 1899 by Marine Vapor Engine Co. at Jersey City, New Jersey.
Tamaahmaah		Captain John Ebbets, John Meek (master)	Brig	210 tons		United States, Kingdom of Hawaii	John Jacob Astor, W. Roberts, and Captain John Ebbets.	1824 sailed from New York to Honolulu. Late 1824 to Sitka; 1825 cruised south from Sitka to San Francisco; 1826 in Hawaii. February 1828 sold to King Kamehameha III.	1824-1825		Built in New York City, 1824. Named after Kamehameha II or Kamehameha III. Made one maritime fur trade voyage.
Tarahne		Charles Coghlan (1919)	180 H.P. gasoline-screw (80 H.P. 1917–1928)	286 (177, 1917–1928)		Canada #138539	White Pass & Yukon Route	Operated on Atlin Lake, 1917–1936.	1917–present	On display at Atlin, B.C.	Built by Cousins Bros.
MV Taseco											
SS Templar											
Tepic						Spain					
Thaddeus		Andrew Blanchard	Brig	241 tons		United States, Boston		1819 left Boston; 1820 arrived in Hawaii with missionaries, then to Sitka; 1820 cruised Northwest Coast south from Sitka. Late 1820 returned to Hawaii and sold.	1820		Made one maritime fur trade voyage. Brought the first missionaries to the Kingdom of Hawaii in 1820.
SS Thames City								Brought the second detachment of Royal Engineers to British Columbia in spring, 1959			
Three Brothers		Alder							1792-93		Consort of Prince William Henry
MV T'lagunna						Canada	BC DoH				
Tonquin		Edmund Fanning, Jonathan Thorn	Barque	269 or 290 tons		U.S.	John Jacob Astor (American Fur Company)	September 1810 left New York for Hawaii. March 1811 at mouth of Columbia River. Began construction of Fort Astoria. June 1811 sailed north to Clayoquot Sound; captured by Nuu-chah-nulth of Chief Wickaninnish; one survivor detonated the ship's powder magazine.	1811	Blown up/scuttled in Clayoquot Sound	Built 1807 in New York City.
SS Tory											
SS Tynemouth											

== U ==
Ship	Other names	Captain(s)	Type	Tons	Draft	Registry (flag)	Owner(s)	Events/locations	Dates in BC	Demise	Comments
Ulysses (merchant ship)		David Lamb		163 tons		United States	David Lamb and other Boston investors	1798 left Boston; 1799 on Northwest Coast. In 1799 officers mutinied against Captain Lamb. At Kaigani agreement was made: Lamb resume control and officers exchanged with ships Eliza and Despatch. William F. Sturgis became first mate of Ulysses. Late 1799 at Canton, then sailed for Boston. Damaged in storm near Saint Helena.	1799	Condemned in April 1800 at Saint Helena after being dismasted in a storm.	Built in Amesbury, Massachusetts, 1794. Made one maritime fur trade voyage.
SS Umatilla	Venture	John C. Ainsworth	paddle steamer			United States	John C. Ainsworth (1/3 owner)	Fraser & Cariboo Gold RushIn 1858, the steamer Venture, on her maiden voyage, drifted over the Columbia River's Upper Cascades, a rough section that steamboats could not navigate. It wrecked. After being hauled out and repaired, the steamer was renamed Umatilla.	Maiden voyage 1858		
SS Una											
Union		John Boit	sloop	94 tons, 65 feet long.		United States	Crowell Hatch and two other Boston investors	1794 left Newport, Rhode Island. 1795 cruised Northwest Coast between Haida Gwaii and Tillamook Bay. Late 1795 sailed to Hawaii and Canton; 1796 returned to Boston and sold. In 1795 attacked by Haida at Ninstints. Chief Koyah killed.	1795		Built at Somerset, Massachusetts. Boit's log published as Log of the Union: John Boit's Remarkable Voyage to the Northwest Coast and Around the World.

== V ==
Ship	Other names	Captain(s)	Type	Tons	Draft	Registry (flag)	Owner(s)	Events/locations	Dates in BC	Demise	Comments
Vancouver		Andrew Cook Mott	Barque, 6 guns, 24 men	324		Britain	HBC	Launched 1838. First to sail directly London-Victoria, 1845		Lost 1848.	HBC ship used for the PNW coast trade.
Vancouver		Thomas Brown (1st and 2nd voyages), Isaac Whittemore (3rd voyage)		235 tons		US	Theodore Lyman and associates (1st and 2nd voyages), J. & T. Lamb, James & Thomas H. Perkins, and Russell Sturgis (3rd voyage)	1802-1803 cruised Northwest Coast; late 1803 in Canton; June 1804 in Boston. August 1804 left Boston; 1805–1806 on Northwest Coast. Assisted Atahualpa after an attack. Late 1806 in Canton; May 1807 in Boston. 1808–1809 on Northwest Coast, then Canton; 1810 returned to Boston and sold.	1802-1803, 1805-1806		Built 1801 at Kennebunk, Maine. Made three maritime fur trade voyages.
SS Vancouver (II)											
Venus		William Hervey, Henry Shepherd or Shepard	brigantine	110 tons, crew of 22 men, "mostly negros of Julu", i.e., Sulu.		Britain		At Nootka Sound during Vancouver-Bodega negotiations	1792		Sailed with Barkley's Halcyon. Crew of 22, "mostly black" Trading out of Bengal.
Victoria		Charles Brewer	Schooner			US	William French, Honolulu.	Maritime Fur Trade	1832		
MV Victoria		JW Doane and Thomas Wright	sternwheeler			Canada	G.B. Wright		Built at Quesnel in 1868	Berthed at Alexandria 1886	
SS Vigilant											
Volunteer (ship)		James Bennett, Seth Barker, Charles Taylor		226 tons		United States	George W. Lyman and firm of Boardman and Pope. Later Bryant & Sturgis.	1817 left Boston; 1818 at Hawaii, then Nahwitti, Vancouver Island. 1818-1820 cruised Northwest Coast, mainly between Vancouver Island and Haida Gwaii. In 1819, with Brutus, rescued crew of wrecked Borneo. Late 1820 to Hawaii and Canton; 1821 in Boston. 1824–1829 on NW Coast with visits to Hawaii.	1818-1820, 1824-1829		Built 1815 at Stonington, Connecticut. Made several maritime fur trade voyages. Experienced two mutinies in 1818. Cooperated with Brutus, entered fur-sharing agreements with Hamilton, Ann, Mentor, and Thaddeus.

== W ==
Ship	Other names	Captain(s)	Type	Tons	Draft	Registry (flag)	Owner(s)	Events/locations	Dates in BC	Demise	Comments
Washington		Captain Stevens	Schooner	122 tons		United States	Josiah Marshall, Boston	1824 sailed from Hawaii to California, cooperating with Owhyhee, and might have visited Northwest Coast. 1827 in New York City. 1828 in Hawaii, then Sitka, Alaska and south to California.	1824? 1828		Built in Plymouth, Massachusetts.
SS William and Ann				161 tons		Britain	HBC	Launched 1818, purchased by HBC 1824	1824-1829	Lost 1829	HBC ship used for the PNW coast trade
SS Woodpecker											

== Y ==
Ship	Other names	Captain(s)	Type	Tons	Draft	Registry (flag)	Owner(s)	Events/locations	Dates in BC	Demise	Comments
Yascathchnoi	Yasashna					Russia					

== See also ==
- Steamboats of the Upper Fraser River in British Columbia
- Steamboats of the Skeena River
- Steamboats of the Arrow Lakes
- Steamboats of Lake Okanagan
- Vessels of the Lakes Route
- Graveyard of the Pacific
- Inside Passage
- Puget Sound Mosquito Fleet
- American Bay
