= Cholmondeley Sound =

Deep bay or inlet in southeast Alaska

Coordinates: 55°14′21″N 132°06′51″W

Cholmondeley Sound is a deep bay or inlet on the southeast side of Prince of Wales Island, in the Alexander Archipelago of southeast Alaska, in Tongass National Forest and connecting to Clarence Strait. The sound's entrance lies between Chasina Point and Skin Island. It is about 20 miles (32 km) west of Ketchikan, Alaska. Cholmondeley Sound has several bays and inlets within it, including Kitkun Bay, Dora Bay, Brennan Bay, and Sunny Cove. At its western end Cholmondeley Sound splits into two fjord-like inlets: West Arm Chomondeley Sound, about 7.5 miles (12.1 km) long, and South Arm Cholmondeley Sound, about 8 miles (13 km) long. The full length from the entrance of the sound to the head of West Arm is about 16 miles (26 km).

Cholmondeley Sound and its several arms are all deep, with steep and heavily forested shorelines.

Cholmondeley Sound was named by George Vancouver on 21 August 1793, for George Cholmondeley, The Earl of Cholmondeley.

There was once a Haida summer village, known as Chatchini or Chat-chee-ni, used by the Kaigani Haida of Kasaan located near the entrance of Cholmondeley Sound, probably at Chasina Point. In the early 19th century the village and a nearby harbor today called Chasina Anchorage were visited by a number of American maritime fur trader. These traders spelled the name of the village in many ways, such as Chartsena, Charsena, Chatseana, and Chartseny. The anchorage was likewise spelled various ways, including Chuckenhoo, Chuckanoo, Chatseanoe, Chuckanahoo, Chucqueneque, and Kukkunuque. As a trading site, Cholmondeley Sound was only slightly north of the very popular site known as "Kaigani". The maritime fur ships that visited Cholmondeley Sound included the Lydia, captain Samuel Hill, Caroline, captain William Sturgis, and Atahualpa, all in 1805; the Otter, captain Samuel Hill, in 1811, the Volunteer, captain James Bennett, in 1818–1819, the Mentor, captain Lemuel Porter, and the Pedler, captain John Meek, in 1821. According to the log of the Otter, the Haida chief Kiangah sailed on the Otter for a while before being returned with a number of war dresses made of deer skins, which he intended to sell to other natives for sea otter furs.
