= Columbia (barque) =

History

United Kingdom
- Name: Columbia
- Owner: Hudson's Bay Company
- Builder: Green, Wigram & Green, Blackwall
- Launched: 8 July 1835
- Fate: Sold in 1850 and last listed 1851

General characteristics
- Tons burthen: 28864/94, or 30330/94, or 309 (bm)
- Length: 103 ft 0 in (31.39 m)
- Beam: 25 ft 6 in (7.77 m)
- Depth: 11 ft 0 in (3.35 m)
- Sail plan: Barque
- Complement: 22, or 24
- Armament: 6 guns
- Notes: Mainly of English Oak, also African Oak and English Elm; masts of Red Pine.

Columbia was a barque launched in 1835 in London for the Hudson's Bay Company (HBC). She served in the service of the Columbia District of the HBC on the Columbia River and elsewhere in the Pacific Northwest in the 1830s and 1840s.

Columbia first appeared in Lloyd's Register (LR) in 1836 with Darbey, master, and Hudson's Bay Company, owner.

On her maiden voyage, in 1835, she served as escort to the Beaver. Her voyages included the coast of California and the Sandwich Islands. In July 1846, the Columbia was nearly lost when a "summer gale" shifted the sands of the bar while she was mid-crossing.She made six voyages out of London in all, and spent part of 1846–1847 in Fort Victoria, British Columbia. Columbia was sold in 1850.

Various letters addressed to sailors serving aboard the barque Columbia survive in the book Undelivered Letters to Hudson's Bay Company Men on the Northwest Coast of America, 1830-57.

== See also ==
- List of ships in British Columbia
