= Hilary Stewart =

Saint Lucia-born Canadian writer (1924–2014)

- Stewart c. 1977
- Born: November 3, 1924; Saint Lucia
- Died: June 5, 2014 (aged 89); British Columbia
- Education: St. Martin's School of Art
- Occupations: writer, illustrator, and expert
- Employer: CHEK TV

Hilary Stewart (3 November 1924 – 5 June 2014) was a Saint Lucia- born Canadian writer known for her books about the Northwest Coast First Nations people. She illustrated other writers' books and published eleven of her own.

== Life ==
Stewart was born in Saint Lucia in 1924. She was sent to boarding school in the UK before studying at St. Martin's School of Art. She had a sister and a brother. She was in the military during the Second World War, and after leaving the forces, she arrived in Canada in 1951.

She was a founding member of the Archaeological Society of British Columbia which started in 1966.

In 1979, she published Looking at Northwest Coast Indian art. The book looks not only at the style of the art but also the associated stories behind the images.

In 1985, British Columbia began giving prizes for books, and her 1984 book, Cedar, was one of the first recipients. Three years later, she repeated the trick after she published her book about John R. Jewitt, John R. Jewitt, Captive of Maquinna.

She lived for 35 years on Quadra Island. She had no qualifications in archaeology, but she was accepted as an authority. She used her skills as an artist to illustrate her work, and others used her work. She experimented by splitting cedar to understand better how the First Nation people made their tools and art.

The Canadian Archaeological Association awarded her their Pendergast award for her work.

She spent the last five years of her life at Campbell River after a stroke. She died in 2014, leaving her books and an endowment fund for the Museum of Anthropology at UBC.

== Bibliography ==
- Looking at Indian art of the Northwest Coast. University of Washington Press and Douglas & McIntyre. 1979. OCLC 4641568.
- Cedar: Tree of Life to the Northwest Coast Indians. 1984. ISBN 1-55054-406-3. OCLC 10950356.
- Looking at Totem Poles. University of Washington Press and Douglas & McIntyre. 1993. ISBN 0-295-97259-9. OCLC 27683602.
