= Atahualpa (ship) =

American merchant ship sold to the Russian Empire in 1813

History

United States
- Name: Atahualpa
- Laid down: Kennebunk, Maine
- Fate: Sold to Russian-American Company, December 1813

Russia (Russian–American Company)
- Name: Bering or Behring
- Acquired: December 1813
- Fate: Wrecked at Waimea Bay, Hawaii, 31 January 1815

General characteristics
- Tons burthen: 210 (bm)

Atahualpa was a United States merchant ship that made six voyages including four maritime fur trading ventures in the early 1800s. In 1813 Atahualpa was sold to the Russian-American Company (RAC) and renamed Bering or Behring. In January 1815 Bering, under the command of the American James Bennett, sailed to the Hawaiian Islands where it stranded at Waimea, Kauai.

Atahualpa was a 210 ton ship built at Kennebunk, Maine. Its sister ship was Guatimozin. The Atahualpa was named after the last Inca emperor Atahualpa. Guatimozin was named after the last Aztec emperor Guatimozin. Both ships were owned by the Boston company of Theodore Lyman and Associates.

== First voyage ==
In the summer of 1800 Atahualpa, under the command of Dixey Wildes, left Boston in company with the Guatimozin. Atahualpa sailed to the Pacific Northwest via Cape Horn to trade with the indigenous peoples of the Pacific Northwest coast for sea otter furs, which commanded a high price in China. Atahualpa spent the summer of 1801 cruising the coast, then wintered at Nahwitti, at the north end of Vancouver Island.

Atahualpa continued cruising the coast for furs in 1802, then sailed to the Hawaiian Islands and on to Canton (Guangzhou), China, where the furs were sold via the Canton System. Then Atahualpa sailed back home via the Sunda Strait and Cape of Good Hope, arriving in Boston in June 1803. During this voyage Atahualpa acquired 3,536 sea otter skins, of which 2,297 were prime pelts, and also 2,374 tails, 40 cotsacks, and 69 pieces, plus 129 beaver and land-otter pelts. This was a large take, as American vessels were averaging just over 1,000 skins at the time. Cotsacks were cloaks made of sea-otter skins sewn together.

The first voyage of Atahualpa is well documented thanks to the log and records of its supercargo Ralph Haskins.

== Second voyage ==
Shortly after returning to Boston in 1803 Atahualpa set out on another maritime fur trading voyage, this time under the command of Oliver Porter. By January 1804 the ship was trading on the Pacific Northwest coast. The ship continued to cruise the coast the following year.

On 12 June 1805 the ship was attacked at Milbanke Sound by the Heiltsuk First Nation. Captain Porter and eight of his men were killed, and several more seriously wounded. According to the surviving crew Atahualpa had been anchored near a native village and all seemed peaceful. A number of natives were on board. A canoe brought the local chief, who called for Captain Porter to inspect some sea otter furs. When Porter leaned over the rail to see, one of the natives on board Atahualpa stabbed him in the back and threw him overboard. Then followed, according to the survivor Joel Richardson, "a general massacre". The captain, first mate, second mate, supercargo, cooper, cook, and others were killed. Some of the crew who were below deck fired up through the hatches and then charged with knives and muskets, retaking the ship. Only four of the crew were uninjured by the end of the battle. These four, with three of the wounded, cleared the deck of dead bodies, loosed sails, waited for the ship to swing the right direction, then cut the anchor cable and barely cleared "the village rock". Then they made all sail and beat out of Milbanke Sound.

According to the Heiltsuk people (Q̓vúqvay̓áitx̌v), the Atahualpa was conducting trading business in a way that was a grave violation of Heiltsuk Ǧviḷás (law). Thus, according to the Heiltsuk the attack was "enforcement of Heiltsuk jurisdiction under Ǧviḷás". The Heiltsuk explain the attack on the Atahualpa as "one example of Heiltsuk agency when making decisions about natural resources and addressing the misconduct of visitors within our territory."

On 17 June 1805 the dead were buried at sea. The ship was taken to Kaigani where it was hoped other American vessels would be found. They waited at Kaigani until 23 June, when Vancouver, under captain Thomas Brown, arrived. The teenage boatswain of Atahualpa was the highest ranking man left alive. He immediately turned the ship over to Captain Brown, who sent his chief mate, David Adams, over to take command of Atahualpa. Mr. Low, who had left Boston as first mate of Lydia and transferred to Vancouver, was made first mate of Atahualpa. The two ships sailed to Nahwitti.

News of the attack spread quickly along the coast and by 27 June there were six New England trading vessels at Nahwitti, three belonging to the Lyman Company, Atahualpa, under David Adams, Vancouver, under Thomas Brown, and Lydia, under Samuel Hill, and the vessels Juno, under John DeWolf, Pearl, and Mary. Between all the ships a plan was devised to make up the lost crew of Atahualpa with men from other ships, and to establish a new hierarchy of command.

The supercargo of Lydia, Isaac Hurd, was happy to volunteer to transfer to Atahualpa. He and Captain Hill had become bitter enemies during the voyage of the Lydia. Hill refused to let Hurd go. It was agreed that Atahualpa, with David Adams as captain, would sail immediately to Canton. Two days were spent preparing Atahualpa for the voyage. The ship's guns and cargo were moved to the Vancouver. On 3 July Brown and Hurd decided that it would be in the best interest of their employer if the cargos of Vancouver and Lydia were consolidated and one of the ships accompany Atahualpa to Canton. Since Vancouver was larger and could easily take Lydia's cargo, but not the reverse, they argued that the Captain Hill of the Lydia should give up his cargo and sail for Canton. As supercargo of the Lydia Hurd was in charge of the cargo, and so went to inform Captain Hill of the decision. Hill reacted with extreme anger and threats of violence. After several days and attempts to persuade Hill to comply with the plan, Hill still refused to transfer any of the cargo. In the end he allowed Hurd to transfer to Atahualpa, allowing him on board Lydia only to get his personal clothing. When Hurd came on board to do so Captain Hill stood over him the entire time with a club, ready to strike. Watching this from the Vancouver, Captain Brown threw up his hands and declared he would never have anything to do with Hill again.

The Lydia's cook, who had also suffered under Captain Hill, snuck away to Atahualpa. As Atahualpa began to sail away, without the escort Brown and Hurd had wanted, Captain Hill approached in a boat and demanded to come aboard to get his cook. David Adams refused. Once Atahualpa was out of Hill's reach the cook came on deck and waved.

From Nahwitti Atahualpa sailed to Canton and then back to Boston, arriving home in late December 1805.

The attack and its aftermath were documented in various ship logs and other records. Ebenezer Clinton's journal of the Atahualpa and Vancouver includes a song memorializing the event, called The Bold Northwestman.

== Third voyage ==
Atahualpa sailed a third maritime fur trading voyage under William Sturgis, leaving Boston in October 1806. The ship trading on the Pacific Northwest Coast in 1807, then sailed to Canton via Hawaii. From Canton Sturgis sailed the ship back to Boston, arriving in June 1808.

Sturgis then sailed Atahualpa from Boston to Canton and back. In the summer of 1809 Atahualpa was attacked twice by pirates in the Pearl River estuary near Canton. The first time Captain Sturgis outran about 200 pirate vessels. The second time the pirates were evaded with the help of four other American vessels.

== Fourth voyage ==
Atahualpa sailed a fourth maritime fur trading voyage under John Suter, leaving Boston in October 1811. The ship cruised the Pacific Northwest Coast from April 1812 to August 1813, then sailed to the Aleutian Islands and on to Hawaii, arriving at the Island of Hawaii on 17 October 1813.

Captain Suter learned that the War of 1812 had broken out between the US and UK in June 1812, putting US ships in danger, and also that the armed schooner Tamaahmaah was waiting at Honolulu to take the cargoes of American trading ships to China. Therefore Suter took Atahualpa to Honolulu, arriving on 19 October 1813. There, in late October 1813, Atahualpa was sold to three New England captains for $4,500. These were William Heath Davis of Isabella, James Bennett of Lydia, Nathan or John Winship, and Lemuel Porter of the Tamaahmaah. Porter had come to Hawaii with instructions to warn American interests about the outbreak of the War of 1812. The purchase of the Atahualpa effectively prevented its seizure by the British since an American registry for the vessel could not be obtained while in the Pacific.

== Russian vessel ==
In December 1813 Atahualpa and another ship were sold to Alexander Baranov of the Russian–American Company for 20,000 sealskins. The Atahualpa was renamed Behring or Bering. James Bennett served as its captain while under RAC ownership. He first sailed the ship to Okhotsk to pick up the furs being used to buy the ship.

Bennett sailed Bering back to Hawaii to pick up provisions for Russian America, arriving at Kauai in early October 1814. He made stops at Honolulu, Oahu, and Maui, before returning to Kauai. Off Niʻihau on 1 January 1815 a leak was discovered, so Bering returned to Honolulu for repairs, after which Bennett sailed back to Kauai, arriving at Waimea Bay on 30 January 1815. During a gale on 30 January 1815, Bering was damaged and drifted toward the shore. At 3:00 AM, 31 January 1815, the ship struck the beach in Waimea Bay, Kauai. Bennett and his crew were stranded on Kauai for two months until 11 April 1815, when they obtained passage on the Albatross, under Captain William Smith. The Native Hawaiian chief Kaumualiʻi kept the ship's goods, including the cargo of furs and the crew's personal possessions. Captain Smith took Bennett to Sitka, Alaska, where he informed Baranov of the loss of Bering and tried to convince him to use force to retrieve the cargo and other property. Baranov decided to try diplomacy and sent Georg Anton Schäffer to Hawaii on the ship Isabella.

Schäffer first went to the Island of Hawaii and met with King Kamehameha. He then went to Oahu and then Kauai. On 2 June 1816 Kaumualiʻi agreed to return the cargo that remained and pay restitution in sandalwood for any items that could no longer be accounted for.

== See also ==
- List of historical ships in British Columbia
