= Victoria (sternwheeler) =

History

Canada
- Name: Victoria
- Builder: James Trahey
- Laid down: 1868
- Launched: 1869
- In service: 1869
- Out of service: 1886
- Fate: Berthed at Steamboat Landing near Alexandria in 1886

General characteristics
- Length: 126 ft (38.4 m)
- Beam: 23 ft (7.0 m)
- Propulsion: 17 ft 8 in (5.38 m) sternwheel

Victoria was a passenger and freight sternwheeler that was built for service on the Soda Creek to Quesnel route on the upper Fraser River in British Columbia. She was built at Quesnel by pioneer shipbuilder James Trahey of Victoria for Gustavus Blin-Wright and Captain Thomas Wright and was put into service in the spring of 1869 to augment the service of Enterprise also built by Trahey for the Wrights. Although the Victoria's hull was new, her engines and boiler had originally been in the Prince of Wales from Lillooet Lake.

The Victoria was the second of twelve sternwheelers that would work on this section of the Fraser River. She was larger than the Enterprise and more powerful. The two steamers worked together for only three years, when in 1871, the Enterprise was taken up to Takla Landing and abandoned on Trembleur Lake. The Victoria would work alone on the Soda Creek to Quesnel route for fifteen more years until 1886.

== The route ==
The Fraser River was not considered navigable by sternwheeler between Yale and Soda Creek due to many hazardous canyons and rapids. The last obstacle to navigation was just downriver from Soda Creek, the Soda Creek Canyon, so the terminus of river navigation on the upper Fraser River was located at Soda Creek. From there a steamer could travel with no obstructions to Quesnel where a stage road ran to Barkerville. The stages of Barnard's Express would travel on the Cariboo Road up from Yale and connect with the Victoria at Soda Creek, a distance of 167 miles (269 km). Passengers and freight would then be transferred onto the sternwheeler and travel upriver 56 miles (90 km) to Quesnel. Once there they would be transferred to company stages again to Barkerville for the last 54 miles (87 km). Victoria made this trip three times a week, from May to October, from 1869 until 1886. She would be taken out of the river and berthed at Steamboat Landing near Alexandria in the fall of 1886. With her departure the upper Fraser River would be without steamer service until 1906.

== See also ==
- Steamboats of the Upper Fraser River in British Columbia
- List of ships in British Columbia

== References and further reading ==
- Downs, Art (1971). Paddlewheels on the Frontier Volume 1. Foremost Publishing. ISBN 0-88826-033-4.
- West, Willis (1985). Stagecoach and Sternwheel Days in the Cariboo and Central BC. Heritage House. ISBN 0-919214-68-1.
- West, Willis (1949). The BX and the Rush to Fort George. British Columbia Historical Quarterly.
