= Bordelais =

Bordelais is a French term meaning "of Bordeaux", including residents, and can refer to:

== Grapes ==
- Baroque (grape), a French wine grape also known as Bordelais
- Bordelais (grape), another name for the French wine grape Folle blanche
- Graciano, a Spanish wine grape that is also known as Bordelais

== Ships ==
- Bordelais (1798 ship), privateer corvette captured by the Royal Navy
- French ship Bordelais, two French Navy ships

== Other uses ==
- an inhabitant of Les Bordes-sur-Lez, a former commune in the Ariège department of southwestern France
- Stade Bordelais, a rugby union club in Bordeaux
- Bordelaise sauce, a sauce prepared with red wine
