= Samuel Hill (sea captain) =

American merchant sea captain and adventurer

- Born: February 20, 1777; Machias, Massachusetts
- Died: September 1, 1825 (aged 48); Boston
- Occupations: Maritime fur trader, merchant sea captain

Samuel Hill (February 20, 1777 – September 1, 1825) was an American merchant sea captain and adventurer. He commanded various ships on many long voyages, often to remote parts of the world.

As one of the early maritime fur traders he rescued John R. Jewitt, who had been enslaved by the Nuu-chah-nulth chief Maquinna. Hill was the first American to live in Japan, almost met Lewis and Clark near Fort Clatsop and received a letter from them, entertained King Kamehameha of the Hawaiian Kingdom on his ship, was involved in the Chilean War of Independence, was imprisoned by the British during the War of 1812, rescued victims of Malayan pirates, and much else. Accounts of Hill by officers serving under him and by other captains consistently describe him as a vicious and unstable tyrant.

== Early life and career ==
Samuel Hill was born on February 20, 1777, in the small port town of Machias, Maine, during the American Revolutionary War. At the time Machias was a target of the Royal Navy and repeatedly subject to incursions, largely in response to the 1775 Battle of Machias, when the people of Machias won a victory against the Royal Navy. Shortly after Hill's birth the British attacked Machias again but were again driven off in the 1777 Battle of Machias.

The ships and voyages he captained include the Lydia (1804–1807), to the Pacific Northwest and China; the Otter (1809–1812), to Hawaii, the Pacific Northwest, Alaska, and China; the Ulysses (1813–1814), as a privateer during the War of 1812; Ophelia (1815–1817), to Chile, Hawaii, Maritime Southeast Asia, and China; and the Packet (1817–1822), to Chile, Hawaii, and China; and several others. Some of these voyages were circumnavigations. He served under other captains on many other ships, such as the Franklin, which went to Japan, 1798–1800.

== Voyage of the Lydia 1804–1807 ==
His first voyage as a captain was on the Lydia, which was owned by the Boston company Lyman and Associates. Hill's brutal and tyrannical behavior on the voyage was documented in the journals of several of his crew members and other fur trading captains. He kept a young Native Hawaiian girl as a sex slave, frequently taking her on one of the ship's boats for days at a time. His first mate and supercargo both wrote about the difficulties and general discontent this caused among the crew, and expressed pity for the "poor innocent girl".

In June 1805, in Haida Gwaii, the Lydia met two other vessels owned by Lyman and Associates, the Atahualpa and Vancouver. The captain and some of the crew of the Atahualpa had been killed during a violent conflict with natives near Milbanke Sound. The three vessels, their surviving captains and officers, tried to cooperate for the benefit of their employer. At the trading harbor of Nahwitti, three more American trading vessels, the Juno, under John DeWolf, Pearl, and Mary, joined them to offer assistance. Some personnel were exchanged and all but Hill agreed that one ship should take all the furs collected and leave the coast. Hill treated the other captains and officers abusively and largely refused to work with them. Captain Thomas Brown of the Vancouver swore he would never again have anything to do with him. Captain Hill did allow a swapping of supercargos between Lydia and Atahualpa. His own supercargo, Isaac Hurd, had suffered under Hill and was happy to leave.

Hill then took the Lydia to Nootka Sound, where he rescued John Jewitt and John Thompson, the sole survivors of the trading ship Boston, which had been attacked by the Nuu-chah-nulth. The two had lived as slaves of Chief Maquinna. Jewitt had been secretly writing letters, hoping one would reach a ship captain. Hill had received one of these letters several months earlier, from a Makah chief. He also knew that the owners of the Boston were offering a reward for the rescue of the survivors. He was also motivated by fear that his reputation would be ruined by Isaac Hurd and Thomas Brown when they returned to Boston. His rescue of Jewitt and Thompson made him a hero in Boston, more than offsetting the condemning reports of Hurd and Brown.

From Nootka Sound, Hill sailed to the Columbia River. In November 1805, he anchored about 10 miles (16 km) from Fort Clatsop, where Lewis and Clark were spending the winter. The local Chinook natives told him about Lewis and Clark, but no contact was made. In July 1806, Hill entered the Columbia River for the third time. The Chinook gave him a letter from Lewis and Clark, who had left just months before.

After visiting the Columbia River in November 1805, Hill took the Lydia north again, seeking furs. In almost every trading encounter Hill abused and cheated, or tried to cheat the native peoples. At Kaigani he tried to deceive the Haida with kegs of gunpowder mostly filled with scrap and with watered down molasses. In May 1806, at the Haida town of Massett, he kidnapped several Haida and held them captive until receiving a ransom in sea otter furs. As he left, some shots were fired from the town toward the Lydia, but fell short. In response Hill turned around and fired a broadside into the town. Continuing south he repeatedly used threats, violence, and kidnapping to acquire furs from native people. His supercargo described it as "plundering the Coast" and thought he was acting "very unwisely".

== Voyage of the Otter 1809–1812 ==
During his second maritime fur trading voyage, on the Otter, he was involved in two violent conflicts in southeast Alaska in 1811. In the first, near Sitka, he helped the Tlingit drive off two ships commanded by Ivan Kuskov of the Russian-American Company. Eight Aleut hunters were murdered during this event. In the second conflict his own ship was attacked by Chilkat Tlingit while in Lynn Canal. Two of his crew were killed and six wounded. The Tlingit suffered 45–100 killed, including 13 chiefs. Hill committed other massacres on this and other voyages, which sometimes had unfortunate consequences much later. In 1822 the logkeeper of the trading vessel Rob Roy wrote that Chief Shakes intended to seize the first ship he could in revenge for the murder of his wife's father by Captain Hill of the Otter. In 1840 the Chilkat Tlingit threatened to attack Fort Taku of the Hudson's Bay Company in revenge for Hill's 1811 attack.

== Later life ==
Samuel Hill died in Boston on September 1, 1825. The cause of death given on his death certificate was "paralytic", which might refer to alcoholism or to some aspect of his mental illnesses.

== See also ==
- List of ships in British Columbia
