= Swell (tugboat) =

Canadian wooden tugboat built in 1912

History

Canada
- Name: Swell
- Operator: Maple Leaf Adventures
- Builder: Beach Avenue Shipyard (Arthur Moscrop), Vancouver, British Columbia
- Launched: 1912
- Completed: 1912
- In service: 1912–present
- Refit: 1954; 2005
- Home port: Victoria, British Columbia
- Identification: Canadian official number 130882; MMSI 316005922
- Status: in active service

General characteristics
- Type: Tugboat (converted to passenger vessel)
- Tonnage: 130 GT after 2005 rebuild
- Length: 25.30 m (83.0 ft) after 2005 rebuild
- Beam: 6.33 m (20.8 ft) after 2005 rebuild
- Depth: 3.28 m (10.8 ft) after 2005 rebuild

Swell is a Canadian wooden-hulled tugboat built in Vancouver, British Columbia, in 1912. Originally constructed as a steam-powered tug for the Victoria Tug Company, the vessel spent much of the 20th century in commercial towing service on the British Columbia coast.

Swell was converted from steam to diesel power during a major rebuild in 1954 and was extensively rebuilt again in 2005. After its career as a working tug, the vessel was converted for passenger use and has operated as a small expedition cruise vessel in British Columbia and Alaska.

== History ==
=== Construction and tugboat service ===
Swell was built in 1912 at the Beach Avenue Shipyard in Vancouver under shipbuilder Arthur Moscrop and was registered in Canada under official number 130882.

The tug was initially owned by George McGregor and operated as the first tug of the Victoria Tug Company. The company, founded in 1912, subsequently operated several tugboats from Victoria Harbour.

As built, Swell measured approximately 70 ft (21 m) in registered length, with a beam of approximately 19 ft (5.8 m), and was powered by an 18-horsepower steam engine manufactured by the Enterprise Engine & Foundry Company of San Francisco.

The vessel remained with the Victoria Tug Company until 1959. During its years as a working tug, it was used for coastal towing in British Columbia. Contemporary accounts of the vessel's history describe it towing commercial vessels along the coast and through the Strait of Juan de Fuca.

=== Diesel conversion and later commercial service ===
In 1954, Swell underwent a major rebuild and its original steam machinery was replaced by a 400-horsepower Enterprise diesel engine. The vessel was later repowered with a Detroit Diesel 12V149 engine.

In 1959, ownership passed to Island Tug & Barge Ltd., which operated the vessel until 1972. Swell was then owned privately by Thomas Stockdale between 1972 and 1979.

In 1974, Swell appeared in an episode of the CBC television series The Beachcombers. The episode, titled "The Swell", was broadcast on 6 October 1974.

During the 1980s and 1990s, the vessel returned to commercial service under several owners. It was owned by Island Merchant Marine Ltd. in 1981, Westview Dredging Ltd. from 1981 to 1989, and Swell Towing Ltd. from 1990 through 2003.

=== Conversion to passenger service ===
In 2004, Swell was acquired by Big Time Sport Fishing BC Ltd. and underwent a major rebuild and conversion for passenger use in 2005.

The vessel was later owned by Icarus Aviation Ltd. During this period its name was changed to Nautilus Swell around 2011. The name reverted to Swell in 2014.

Maple Leaf Adventures acquired the vessel in 2014 and introduced it into expedition-cruise service in 2015. It subsequently operated voyages in the Gulf Islands, the Great Bear Rainforest, Southeast Alaska, and other parts of the Inside Passage.

== Design ==
Swell has a carvel-planked wooden hull on frames, with Douglas fir planking and a steel box keel. Its decks are western redcedar, while the cap rails and guards are purpleheart.

As built in 1912, the vessel measured approximately 70 ft (21 m) in registered length and 19 ft (5.8 m) in beam. It was originally powered by an 18-horsepower steam engine manufactured by the Enterprise Engine & Foundry Company of San Francisco, driving a single screw.

The vessel underwent substantial modifications during its working life. Its original steam machinery was replaced with a diesel engine during a major rebuild in 1954. Following its 2005 reconstruction and conversion for passenger service, Swell measured 25.30 m (83.0 ft) in length, 6.33 m (20.8 ft) in beam and 3.28 m (10.8 ft) in depth, with a gross tonnage of 130.

In its current passenger configuration, the vessel accommodates up to 12 passengers in six cabins.

== See also ==
- List of historic vessels in British Columbia
