= Phoenix (1792) =

Phoenix was a ship involved in the maritime fur trade of the Pacific during the late 18th century.

Her captain was Hugh Moore, and her home port was Bombay. She is known to have visited the Pacific Northwest in 1792, and to have wintered in the Columbia River in 1794. Phoenix visited a prominent Haida village on Langara Island in 1792. As historian F. Howay recounted:

"On the 17th arrived the bark, Phoenix of Bengal, Captain Hugh Moore. He had left Bengal seven months before and had since his arrival on the coast been trading to the northward... From Captain Moore they learned of the execution of Louis XVI in January, 1793. This ship remained until the 28th..."

Sailing south to Alta California during March 1795, Phoenix traded for sea otter furs in Santa Barbara before visiting the Kingdom of Hawaii and later the Qing port of Guangzhou. William Marsden later employed the ship to collect several nutmeg and cloves for agricultural efforts in Sumatra. Phoenix delivered the cargo in July 1798 "a complete success."

Phoenix was the namesake of the Russian-American Company brig Phoenix, the first vessel built in Russian America by Alexandr Baranov. Moore in the Phoenix had met Baranov near the "Green Islands" in 1793, when Baranov had offered him "every assistance in his power".
