= French ship Bordelais =

At least two ships of the French Navy have been named Bordelais:

- French destroyer Bordelais, a L'Adroit-class destroyer launched in 1928 and scuttled in 1942.
- French frigate Le Bordelais, a Le Corse-class frigate launched in 1953 and scrapped in 1981.
