= SS Pacific =

SS Pacific was the name of a number of steamships, including:

- SS Pacific (1849)
- SS Pacific (1850)
- SS Pacific (1880)
- SS Pacific (1914)

== See also ==
- MS Pacific
