= John R. Jewitt =

English armourer (1783–1821)

- Born: 21 May 1783; Boston, Lincolnshire, England
- Died: 7 January 1821 (aged 37); Hartford, Connecticut, United States
- Occupations: Blacksmith, armourer

John Rodgers Jewitt (21 May 1783 – 7 January 1821) was an English armourer who entered the historical record with his memoirs about the 28 months he spent as an enslaved captive of Maquinna of the Nuu-chah-nulth (Nootka) people on what is now the British Columbia Coast. The Canadian Encyclopedia describes Jewitt as a shrewd observer and his Narrative as a "classic of captivity literature". The memoir, according to the Dictionary of Canadian Biography, is a major source of information about the indigenous peoples of the Pacific Northwest Coast.

== Early life and voyage ==
Jewitt's father was a blacksmith and trained his eldest son for that trade, but intended that his younger son go into one of the learned professions. Accordingly, from the age of 12, John attended an academy at Donington in Lincolnshire that provided an "education superior to that which is to be obtained in a common school" (p. 6). He learned Latin, higher mathematics, navigation and surveying. After two years, his father withdrew him from school in order to apprentice him to a surgeon at Reasby, in the neighbourhood of the great traveller and naturalist Sir Joseph Banks. Jewitt pleaded with his father to be allowed to learn metalwork instead, and eventually he was allowed to do so. He quickly learned his trade. About a year later (c. 1798) the family moved to Hull, then one of the main ports and trading centres of Britain, where the Jewitt business picked up a lot of custom from the ships.

Jewitt read the voyages of explorers such as Captain Cook and became acquainted with sailors; both of these sources of stories made him wish to travel. In 1802, an American captain, John Salter, invited him to sign on as an armourer to a round-the-world trip on his ship Boston, out of Boston, Massachusetts. They were to sail in a triangle: first to the Pacific Northwest coast of North America to trade furs there; then to China for further trading; and finally to the home port in New England. Jewitt was offered the chance to settle in the United States at the end of the voyage if he wished. He and the captain persuaded his father, and he signed on for thirty dollars (around $600 in 2020) a month. The ship left British waters in convoy on 3 September 1802. Part of his job while on board was to make hatchets, daggers, and knives "for the Indian trade" (p. 15). A month's sail took them to the Island of St. Catherine on the coast of Brazil (today's city of Florianópolis), then around Cape Horn, and straight to Vancouver Island, avoiding the Sandwich Islands (now Hawaii). The crew, tired of subsisting on salt meat, caught porpoises, which they called "herring hogs" (p. 19), and sharks, which they considered fishes. The captain shot an albatross with a wingspan of 15 feet (p. 20).

Ten weeks after passing Cape Horn, Boston reached Woody Point in Nootka Sound. Salter decided to stop a few miles from any habitation to get wood and water. The next morning, 13 March 1803, several people from Nootka village, including Maquinna, came aboard to trade. (Jewitt throughout his memoirs refers to Maquinna as a king, and those subordinate to him as chiefs.) Because of the frequent British and American trading ships, Maquinna had learned enough English to communicate. Generally, there was cordiality and friendliness between his people and the visiting ships, although Captain Salter took the precaution of having them searched for weapons before allowing them to come aboard. Salter gave Maquinna a fowling piece (shotgun) as a present, which was somehow broken, leading to harsh words from the captain and suppressed rage on the part of Maquinna, who decided to take revenge for offences committed by previous European ships over the years.

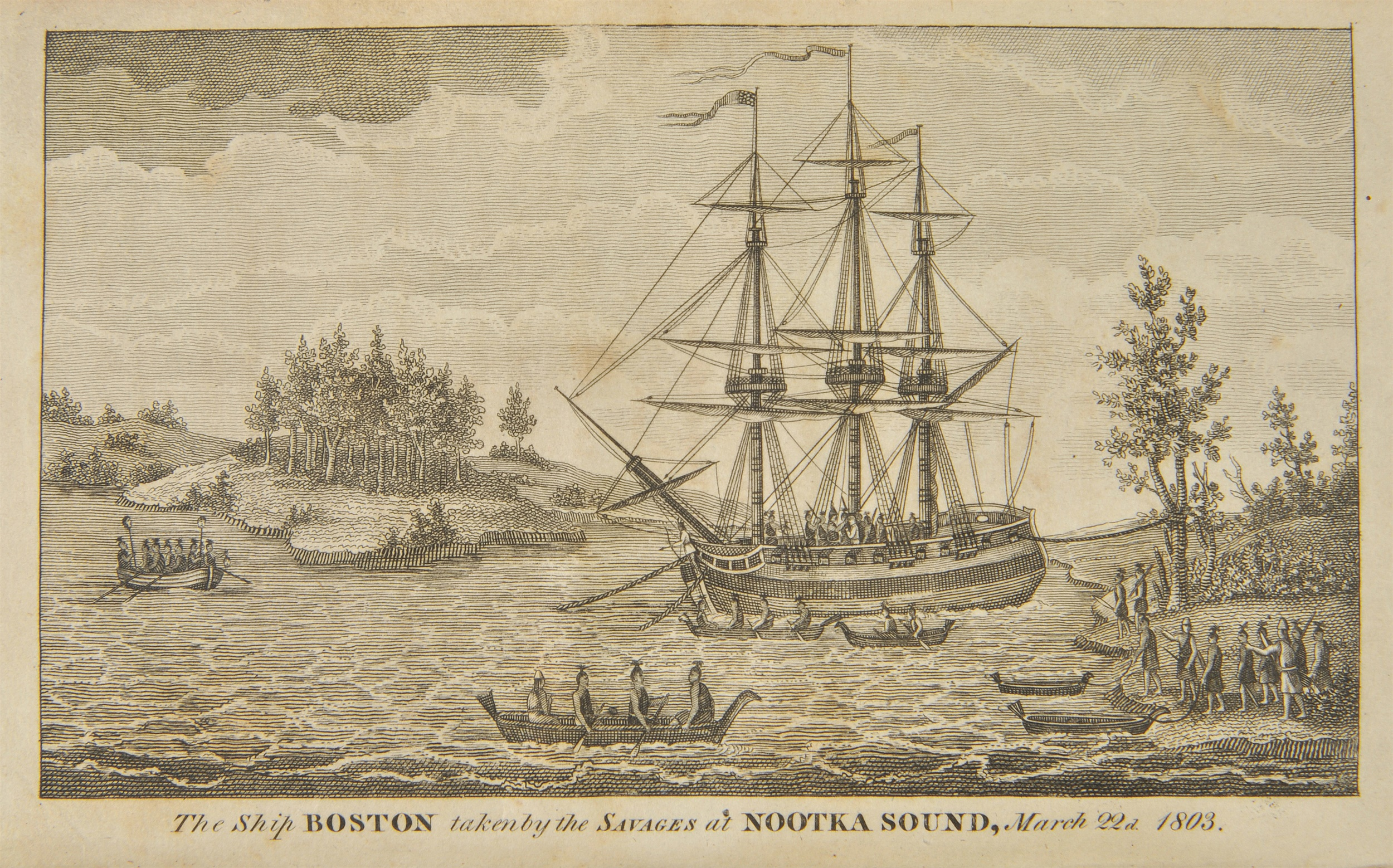
The ship Boston taken by the savages at Nootka Sound

On 22 March 1803, the day before Boston intended to set sail, Nootka came aboard to trade and were given dinner. At a signal, the Nootka attacked, and all but two of the white men were killed. Jewitt suffered a serious head injury but his life was saved by Maquinna, who saw how useful it would be to have an armourer to repair weapons. (One other man—the Boston's sailmaker, John Thompson—was in hiding until the next day, when Jewitt pretended to be his son and begged Maquinna to spare his "father".) Maquinna asked Jewitt if he would be his slave and Jewitt assented under duress, as the alternative was immediate death (p. 31). This was the beginning of his three years among the Nootka.

== Life with the Nootka ==
=== Enslavement ===
Jewitt remained a captive of Maquinna until 1805, during which time he became immersed in the Nootka culture and was forced to marry. Through the years, Jewitt and Macquinna became close, like brothers. The distinction between prisoner of war and slave is not clear-cut, but Jewitt lost his liberty and had to work for Maquinna. Jewitt uses the word "slave" to describe his position and asserts that Maquinna had about 50 others, consisting of half his household. Thompson (the sailmaker) and Jewitt were taunted, out of Maquinna's hearing, as "white slaves", with explosive results, including a death.

Slaves were the Nootkas' most valuable property (p. 88), and might be killed if they tried to run away. Jewitt says that slaves ate with the family, the same food in different dishes (p. 71), and were generally well-treated but had to work hard (p. 88); often the king's household would run short of food, so he would beg elsewhere (p. 59). Maquinna allowed Jewitt to undertake other work when not employed by him, and he used this privilege to make bracelets, fish-hooks, and so on, to trade with the chiefs of the village and other visitors. Other chiefs or kings, including the king Wickaninnish of the Tla-o-qui-aht (Clayoquot), attempted to buy Jewitt, but Maquinna declined (p. 151). Machee Ulatilla, king of the Klaizzarts, wished to buy him, promising to release him to any European ship that passed, and in the end it was through his help that deliverance came.

Their Christian beliefs were a source of strength to Jewitt and Thompson. They were permitted to keep the Sabbath, by withdrawing on Sundays to bathe, read and pray. The men even made an effort to cook and eat a special Christmas dinner and often gave thanks for their continued existence.

The women, including Maquinna's nine wives, expressed compassion towards Jewitt, but the 500 warriors wanted him to be killed (p. 34). Maquinna repeatedly protected him and refused to allow his death. Jewitt adopted a conciliatory approach and made an effort to learn the language.

=== Descriptions of the natives' lives ===
Jewitt describes in some detail the physical appearance, clothing and hats, jewellery, and face and body painting of the Nootka. He explains the household implements (baskets, bags), simple furniture (wooden boxes, tubs, trays) and food, describing it as constantly either feasting or fasting. Herring spawn, dried fish, clams, oysters, sea mammal blubber and "train oil" (whale oil) were staples of the diet (the oil was even added to strawberries). Venison and bear meat were eaten fresh, but fish was often fermented; a delicacy was salmon roe. Jewitt had metal cooking pots from the ship, but was forbidden from preparing his own food—Maquinna insisted that his captives lived and ate as the Nootka did (p. 51), i.e. boiling and steaming their food (p. 69). The Nootka did not eat salted food or add salt to anything, and Maquinna forbade his captives to make salt (p. 51). Jewitt found a box of chocolate and a case of port wine (p. 47) from the ship's stores, which gave him much comfort, as the Nootka did not like these delicacies, although they did appreciate molasses, rum, and other spirits. The men became completely intoxicated when they had access to alcohol, but the women drank only water (p. 48), and Jewitt feared for his safety when his captors were drunk.

Pages of the memoir are devoted to descriptions of activities such as music, dance, and song (which was used to keep time in their ocean paddling); hospitality and gift-giving (the famous potlatch); their customs regarding sex, cleanliness, illness, healing, and death; system of government and punishments; religious beliefs and ceremonies (including the treatment of the parents of twins); and even the manner of sitting and eating. Other tribes, often tributaries, are listed, described, and their warriors numbered; Jewitt's transliteration does not always match modern renderings of the names. Jewitt mentions the class structure and says that women were excluded from most feasting. Women in general were modest, but female slaves were used for sex. Jewitt describes their methods of fishing, trapping bears, and trading (including slave trading). He writes about their weapons, and how they made and managed their huge dugout canoes. Jewitt introduced a new sort of harpoon, enabling more successful whale hunts, and various other weapons and implements that Maquinna reserved to himself as king.

=== Geography and historical background ===
Jewitt gives a thorough description of the village of Nootka in Friendly Cove, the appearance and construction of the longhouses, and the geography of the surrounding terrain (starting p. 59). The Spanish had occupied the area a generation before, forced the people to migrate a few miles away, and built a garrison called Fort San Miguel. With the Nootka Conventions of the 1790s, an agreement signed in Europe and of which the indigenous people knew nothing, the Spanish left and the Nootka returned to their village. The foundations of the church and the governor's house and the remnants of the kitchen garden were visible during Jewitt's time there.

Jewitt spent the spring and summer at that village, the autumn (beginning of September to end of December) at Tashees, ideally situated for the salmon, and the midwinter months at Coopte, 15 miles (24 km) nearer Nootka, for herring and sprat fishing. This annual nomadism involved packing up everything, even the planks on the outside of their longhouses, to transport in their canoes.

Jewitt counted the Nootka people (only those in the town of Yuquot) at about 1500 inhabitants, of whom 500 were warriors.

=== Compulsion ===
Jewitt wrote in the Narrative that he was ordered to participate in a night-time raid on a village identified as A-y-chart. He said he took four captives, which Maquinna allowed him to keep as his own "as a favour", while Thompson killed seven (p. 150). All of the inhabitants were either killed or enslaved. However, some doubt Jewitt and Thompson really participated in any such attack. While the story appears in the Narrative, there is no mention of any such occurrence in the original diary and no mention of the four slaves. Contemporary maritime historical accounts support the possibility that Jewitt was recounting the story of a Wickaninnish attack that he heard about; this may be because he wished to dramatize his story for his readers.

He was allegedly ordered to marry, because the council of chiefs thought that a wife and family would reconcile him to staying with the Nootka for life. He was reportedly given a choice between forced marriage for himself and capital punishment for both him and his "father". "Reduced to this sad extremity, with death on the one side, and matrimony on the other, I thought proper to choose what appeared to me the least of the two evils" (p. 154). However, Jewitt's story of forced marriage has also been questioned. Both Captain Barclay and a later British ethnologist in the mid-19th century reported meeting older witnesses who said Jewitt had been involved in a passionate love affair with the daughter of a neighbouring chief. It has been speculated that Jewitt created the "forced marriage" story in accordance with the mores of the time. Jewitt's account does confirm he married the seventeen-year-old daughter of a neighbouring chief.

Maquinna took him to a neighbouring village and paid a bride price for Jewitt's selection, who was indeed the young daughter of the chief. Jewitt then set up his own home in Maquinna's longhouse, building beds so as to not sleep on the dirt floor, and insisting on cleanliness for both his wife and Maquinna's twelve-year-old son, who chose to live with them. Jewitt viewed the marriage as a chain binding him to "this savage land" (p. 161).

Maquinna and the chiefs then decided that Jewitt must now be "considered one of them, and conform to their customs", especially the wearing of Nootka clothing (p. 161). Jewitt resented the imposition of this dress code, finding the loose, untailored garments cold, and attributed to them a subsequent illness of which he almost died. He was not allowed to cut his hair, and had to paint his face and body as a Nootka would.

Jewitt was asked to file the teeth of the king's elder brother. He did so without understanding why, but found out it was to enable the chief to bite off the nose of a new wife who refused to sleep with him. Jewitt unsuccessfully attempted to dissuade him from carrying out this traditional punishment (p. 207).

== Rescue and return journey ==
On 19 July 1805, the brig Lydia arrived in Nootka Sound, Captain Samuel Hill having received one of the 16 letters that Jewitt had written and attempted to get to ships' captains. Maquinna asked Jewitt if it would be safe for him to go aboard, and asked him to write a letter of recommendation to the captain to ensure safe passage. Jewitt wrote a letter of rather different meaning, asking the captain to hold Maquinna securely, and expressing the hope that he and Thompson would then be free within hours. He said he had no fear in doing so, knowing that the captain would not harm the king, and the people would not harm him while their king was captive. The captain put Maquinna in irons, and allowed him to speak to one of his men, who returned to shore. The common people were furious and threatened to chop Jewitt up into little pieces (p. 186), but the chiefs were calmer and asked his advice. He told them that Maquinna was in no danger as long as he and Thompson were well treated, and advised them to let his "father" go to the ship to ensure this. Jewitt and the chiefs then came up with a prisoner exchange scheme.

When Jewitt got on board the Lydia he was painted red and black, wrapped in a bear skin and with green leaves through his topknot. Nonetheless, the captain welcomed him as a Christian and asked his advice about what to do with Maquinna. When he heard what exactly had happened to the Boston, he was inclined to execute him, but Jewitt persuaded him of the impolicy of this, because it would lead to further attacks on other ships visiting. Jewitt negotiated for the return of what property remained of the Boston: its cannons, anchors, and remnants of its cargo, and especially the ship's papers, which he had secured in a chest all those years ago. Once these were on board the Lydia, Maquinna was released, and the brig immediately weighed anchor and left Nootka Sound.

Jewitt was not able to return home quickly. The Lydia traded along the Pacific coast for four months, eventually going to the Columbia River to obtain timber for spars. They discovered that they had just missed the cross-continental explorers Lewis and Clark by a fortnight. In late November, they returned to Nootka to trade for furs. Jewitt went on shore to meet Maquinna, and they met as old friends. Maquinna promised to raise Jewitt's son (then five months) as his own.

Over a year after his release from slavery, Jewitt left the coast on 11 August 1806. The Lydia took four months to reach China, trading at Macau and Canton, where he met an old acquaintance from Hull who had also taken to the sea. The Lydia left China in February 1807 and 114 days later was in Boston, USA, to Jewitt's huge relief, where he found a letter from his stepmother congratulating him on his escape.

== Later life ==
In 1807, Jewitt published his Journal Kept at Nootka Sound. The interest generated by this journal prompted Richard Alsop to interview him extensively. This material, combined with his earlier and more terse Journal, culminated in the 1815 publication of A Narrative of the Adventures and Sufferings of John R. Jewitt, only survivor of the crew of the ship Boston, during a captivity of nearly three years among the savages of Nootka Sound: with an account of the manners, mode of living, and religious opinions of the natives. Little of the Journal is left out of the Narrative—e.g. the episode (28 March 1804) of an accidental fatal shooting by a father of his children. The main difference is that in the former Jewitt refers to Maquinna as a chief, and in the latter as a king.

Jewitt spent the later part of his life in New England, and died in Hartford, Connecticut on 7 January 1821 at the age of 37.

== Bibliography ==
- The Adventures and Sufferings of John R. Jewitt : Captive of Maquinna by Hilary Stewart (1987)
