= William Sturgis =

American merchant and politician

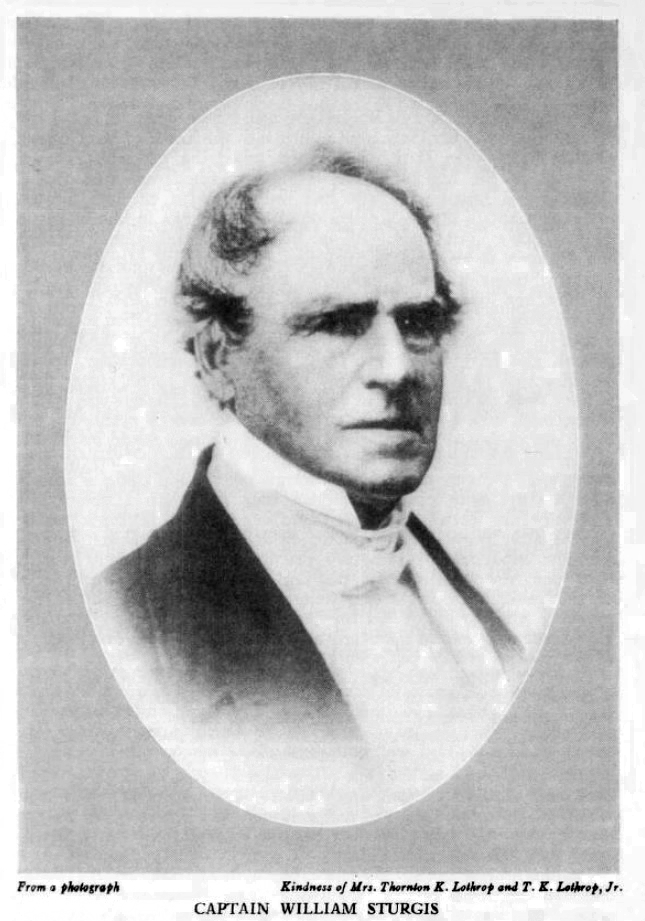
- Captain William Sturgis
- Born: February 25, 1782; Barnstable, Massachusetts, U.S.
- Died: October 21, 1863 (aged 81)
- Occupations: Politician, Merchant
- Known for: member of the Massachusetts House and Senate, a member and president of the Boston Marine Society, a member of the Massachusetts Historical Society
- Parent(s): Hannah Mills and William E. Sturgis
- Relatives: Russell Sturgis, uncle

William Sturgis (February 25, 1782 – October 21, 1863) was a Boston merchant in the China trade, the California hide trade and the maritime fur trade.

== Early life ==
Sturgis was born in Barnstable, Massachusetts, to Hannah Mills and William E. Sturgis, a ship master and lineal descendant from Edward Sturgis of Yarmouth, Massachusetts, the first Sturgis in America (arrived 1630).

In 1796, he joined the counting house of his uncle Russell Sturgis (1750–1826), and less than two years later became connected with James and Thomas Handasyd Perkins' maritime fur trade between the Pacific Northwest coast and China. Their sister, Elizabeth Perkins, was the wife of Russell Sturgis.

Upon his father's death in 1797, he went to sea to support the family as assistant trader on the Eliza, then as chief mate of Ulysses. He then served under Captain Charles Derby on Caroline until Derby died and Sturgis took command. In 1804 Caroline sailed from the Columbia River to Kaigani, just south of Prince of Wales Island, Alaska, acquiring some 2,500 sea otter skins that netted $73,034.

In 1809, his ship Atahualpa, owned by Theodore Lyman I, was attacked by Chinese pirates while moored at Macau Roads. Sturgis managed to get the ship underway and fought off the pirates using four small cannons he had brought on board against the wishes of the ship's owner. Using these, they managed to fight long enough to sail within range of the protective guns of the harbor, and the pirates were captured, their commander Apootsae later being tortured to death by the Mandarin authorities. Sturgis had been prepared to blow up the ship if the pirates caught them in order to save the crew and passengers from being tortured. Lyman reportedly chastised Sturgis for having violated his instructions by bringing the cannon on the voyage.

== Bryant & Sturgis ==
In 1810, he returned to Boston formed a trading partnership with John Bryant as Bryant & Sturgis. They served as investment managers to John Perkins Cushing, when Cushing was in the railroad business in New York and Pennsylvania. By 1843, Sturgis was a director of the Attica and Buffalo Railroad. It was with advice from Sturgis that John Murray and Robert Bennet Forbes started their investment in the railroad business in 1843.

From 1810 to 1850 more than half of the trade carried on between the Pacific Northwest coast and China was operated by Bryant & Sturgis, and also substantial parts of the California hide trade.

== Personal life ==
On his return to Boston in 1810 he married Elizabeth M. Davis, with whom he had one son, William Watson (1810–1826), and five daughters: Ellen Sturgis Hooper (1812–1848), a Transcendentalist poet and mother of Marian Hooper Adams; Anne Sturgis (1813–1884); Caroline Sturgis Tappan (1819–1888), a member of the Transcendental Club and poet published in The Dial, whose daughter Mary Aspinwall Tappan (1851–1941) and granddaughter Rosamund Sturgis Dixey (1887–1948) donated the Tanglewood estate to the Boston Symphony Orchestra in 1936; Mary Louisa Sturgis (1821–1870); and Susan Sturgis (1825–1853).

== Political career ==
In 1814, Sturgis was elected a representative of the town of Boston in the Legislature of Massachusetts. From that year until 1845, he was a member of the Massachusetts House or of the Senate.

Sturgis was a member and a president of the Boston Marine Society, an honorary member of the Massachusetts Mechanics' Charitable Association and a member of the Massachusetts Historical Society.

== Legacy ==
Sturgis donated his childhood home to be the Barnstable public library, now called the Sturgis Library, and his papers are collected there. Bryant & Sturgis business records are preserved at the Baker Library of the Harvard Business School.

A short time before his death, Sturgis donated $10,000 to the Observatory in Cambridge.

Sturgis was one of the early investors in Massachusetts General Hospital.

He was a trustee of the Boston Athenaeum from 1823 to 1825.

There is a Sturgis Charter Public School, an IB For all 9-12 school in Hyannis, Massachusetts.

=== The ship William Sturgis ===
William Sturgis of Boston was an 1849 ship of 649½ tons, built by James O. Curtis in Medford, Massachusetts, for William F. Weld & Co. She sailed from Cardiff to Iloilo with a cargo of coal. On Sept. 19, 1863, she was off the coast of Guimaras. She struck the Magicienne Bank, then sank on Ottorg Bank.
