= Supercargo =

Person employed on board a vessel by the owner of cargo carried on the ship

A supercargo (from Italian sopracargo or from Spanish sobrecargo) is a person employed on board a vessel by the owner of cargo carried on a ship. The duties of a supercargo are defined by admiralty law and include managing the cargo owner's trade, selling the merchandise in ports to which the vessel is sailing, and buying and receiving goods to be carried on the return voyage.

The supercargo has control of the cargo unless limited by other contracts or agreements. For instance, the supercargo has no authority over the stevedores, and has no role in the necessary preparatory work prior to the handling of cargo. Sailing as they do from port to port with the vessel to which they are attached, supercargos differ from factors, who have a fixed place of residence at a port or other trading place.

== History ==
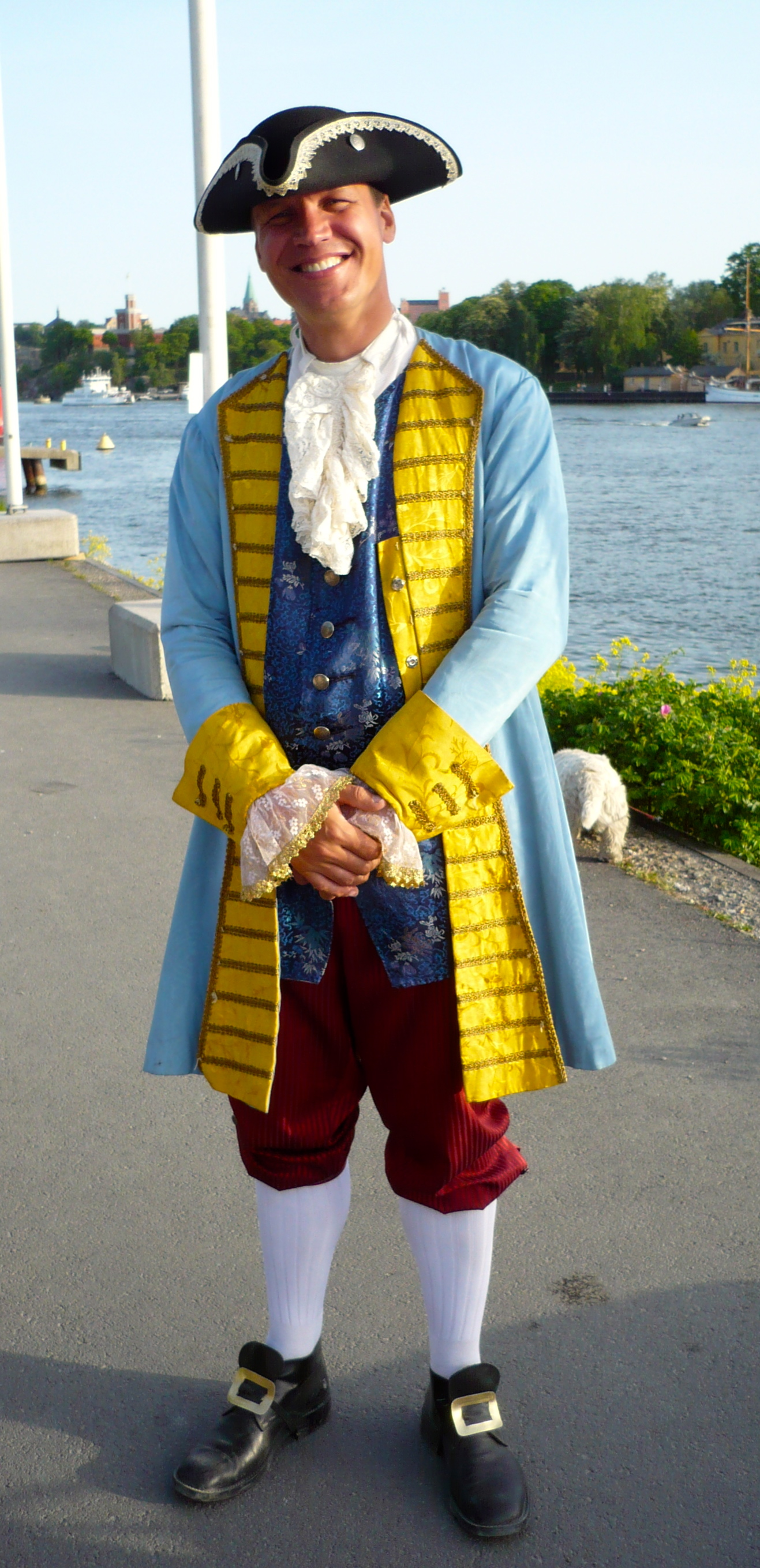
Reenactor representing a supercargo from the Swedish East India Company on the Götheborg visiting the port of Stockholm in 2008

During the Age of Sail from the 16th to the mid-19th century, the supercargo was the second-most important person aboard a merchant ship after the captain.

=== Sweden ===
On ships of the Swedish East India Company (1731–1813), the supercargo represented the company and was in charge of all matters related to trade, while the captain was in charge of navigation, loading and unloading of cargo as well as the maintenance of the ship. The captain was restricted to following written orders from the supercargo. A new supercargo was always appointed for each journey; he had to keep books, notes and ledgers about everything that happened during the voyage and trade matters abroad. He was to present these immediately to the directors of the Company on the ship's return to its headquarters in Gothenburg. The supercargo was fined for each day the books were delayed. Helping him in all this, he had a staff of assistants: a concierge, a cook, a footman and his own ship's court, consisting of seven persons. According to historical documents, the court remained busy throughout the voyage. The supercargo also had to maintain and run the company's factory at the trading destination.

Having the highest rank aboard the ship, the supercargo also received the highest salary. In addition to this, he received six percent of the value of the cargo which the ship carried home. Every person on board had the right to buy, bring home goods, and sell them in Sweden. The amount of goods permitted was regulated by the person's rank aboard the ship and his financial means. At the top of this list was the supercargo.

== See also ==
- Loadmaster, a similar role for command personnel of a military cargo aircraft
- Payload Specialist, the equivalent role on NASA Space Shuttle missions
