= Vessels of the Lakes Route =

Historic wagon route through the British Columbia interior

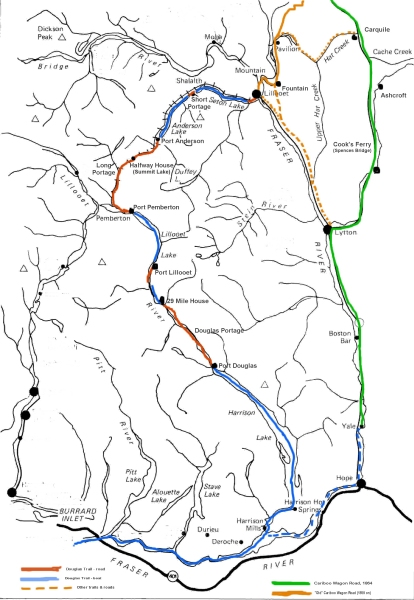
Route of the Douglas Road (water portions of the Lakes Route in blue, land portions in red) and the Cariboo Road (green).

The Lakes Route is an alternate name for the Douglas Road, which was the first formally designated "road" into the Interior of British Columbia, Canada, from the Lower Mainland area flanking the Lower Fraser River. Also known as the Douglas-Lillooet Trail or the Lillooet Trail (not to be confused with the Lillooet Cattle Trail, which is also called the Lillooet Trail), the route consisted of a series of wagon roads connected via lake travel in between. A variety of craft propelled by a variety of means, from steam to sail to diesel and other combustion engines, were used on the lakes into the early 20th century. Lake travel continued for commerce, passenger travel, and heavy freight until after World War II.

== History ==
There were originally four lakes on the route, in addition to Harrison Lake at the road's commencement at Port Douglas, which is navigable from the Lower Fraser and so also from the Gulf of Georgia and Victoria and beyond. These were Little Lillooet Lake or Tenas Lake ("tenas" means "small" or "child" in the Chinook Jargon, a name also used for Birken Lake, which also lies along the route), Lillooet Lake, Anderson Lake, and Seton Lake, the foot of which is within a few miles of the Fraser River at the modern town of Lillooet (until 1860 called Cayoosh Flat or Cayoosh) and from where the last few miles of wagon road completed the official Douglas Road. From there the Old Cariboo Road was constructed by entrepreneur Gustavus Blin Wright to Alexandria in order to serve the booming traffic to the Cariboo and points northwards.

The combination of the Douglas Road and Blin Wright's toll road were the main route north for freight and travel (excepting the River Trail, which was for packhorses, mules, and foot only) and so the Douglas Road and its various vessels saw a huge amount of traffic, though this diminished rapidly once the Cariboo Road from Yale via Ashcroft was opened in 1864 (the critical section from Yale to the existing older road at Clinton, which bypassed Port Douglas, Douglas Road and Lillooet entirely, being completed by about 1863), after which the route fell into decline. Continued needs by the communities in the isolated Pemberton and Gates Valleys, which were dependent on Lillooet for most services and on either Lillooet or the old sea access from Port Douglas, meant that for many years passenger and freight services continued on a smaller scale, particularly on Seton and Anderson Lakes.

The boom in the Bridge River goldfields from the 1890s and the transportation of heavy equipment into the mines required barge transport, and the construction of the Pacific Great Eastern Railway along the north shores of these lakes also involved their own small flotilla of construction-related craft. Later, when development of the Bridge River Project swung into full gear after World War II, hydro construction also required lake transport, although rail service was largely preferred.

Little Lillooet Lake was raised slightly by the Royal Engineers in their improvements to the route, turning it into a lower arm of Lillooet Lake, obliterating the need for the short portage to Lillooet Lake and moving the southern port on that lake – originally called Port Lillooet – down to what had been the south end of Little Lillooet Lake.

== Vessels on Little Lillooet and Lillooet Lakes ==
- SS Prince Lee Boo

== Vessels on Anderson Lake ==
- Lady of the Lake Steamer, built for Chapman & Company in 1860

== Vessels on Seton Lake ==
- MV Champion
- Minne-ha-ha
- Bluebird
- Marshall's Ferry

== See also ==
- Steamboats of the Arrow Lakes
- Steamboats of Lake Okanagan
- Steamboats of the Lower Fraser River and Harrison Lake
- Steamboats of the Upper Fraser River in British Columbia
- Steamboats of the Skeena River
- Steamboats of the upper Columbia and Kootenay Rivers
- Steamboats of the Yukon River
