= Ned McGowan (lawyer) =

American lawyer (1813–1893)

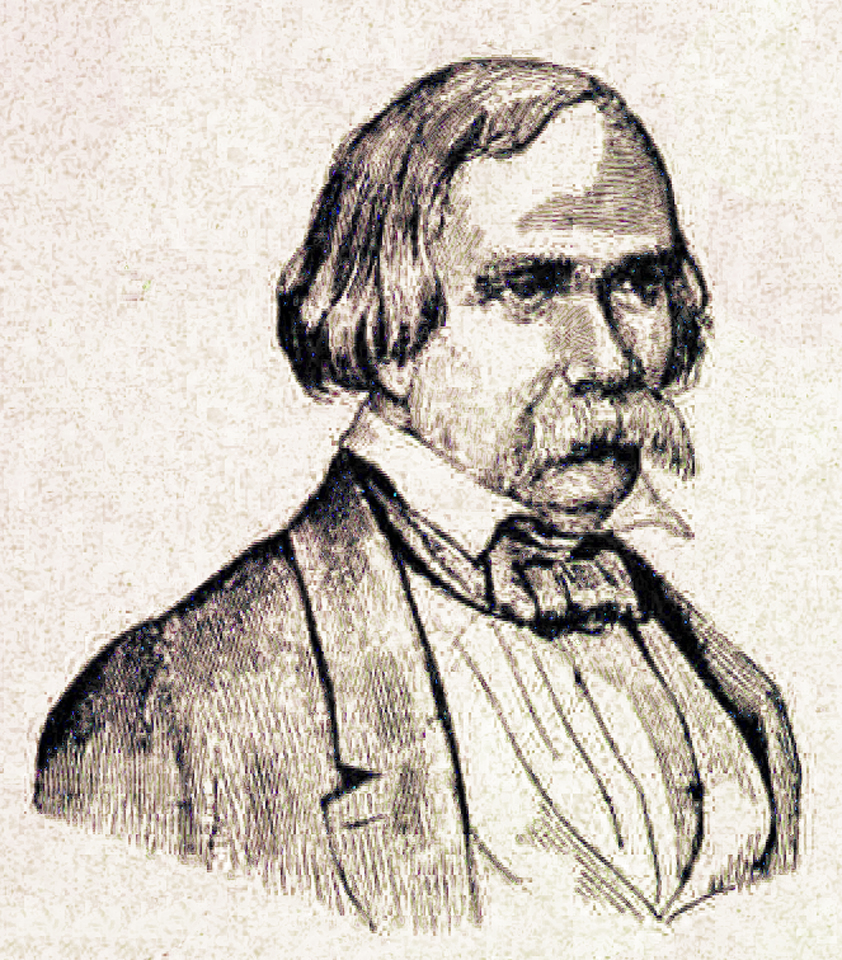
- Born: March 12, 1813; Philadelphia, Pennsylvania, U.S.
- Died: December 8, 1893 (aged 80); San Francisco, California, U.S.
- Burial place: Holy Cross Cemetery, San Francisco
- Occupations: Lawyer, politician, newspaper publisher, prospector
- Known for: McGowan's War

Edward McGowan (March 12, 1813 – December 8, 1893) was an American lawyer, Pennsylvania assemblyman, Judge of the California Court of Quarter Sessions, poet, Fraser Canyon gold seeker, adventurer, assistant sergeant-at-arms in the United States Congress, newspaper publisher and bon vivant instigator of the eponymous McGowan's War in colonial British Columbia.

== Pennsylvania: rise to power and descent to disgrace ==
Ned McGowan was born into an Irish-Catholic family in Philadelphia. In 1838 he was elected as a Democrat to the post of County Clerk of Moyamensing, Philadelphia County, and in 1842 was elected to the House of Assembly of Pennsylvania. McGowan was placed on the state committee on printing. John Bratton, a powerful Whig who owned a printing business that was in danger of losing government contracts, alleged in his newspaper that McGowan had accepted bribes to support a rival bid.

When Bratton was permitted onto the floor of the Assembly, McGowan became enraged and attacked him. After Bratton stabbed him, McGowan hit Bratton with a chair on the head, all in front of the Pennsylvania legislators. The investigation which followed the fight was dominated by Whigs, and McGowan resigned rather than face an ignominious expulsion. Appointed as superintendent of police in Moyamensing, McGowan became embroiled in yet another controversy when he was implicated in a robbery and convicted in October 1848 on dubious evidence by a judge who, according to Donald Hauka, was either a Whig or a personal enemy. The verdict was overturned on appeal by the Quarter Sessions Court.

== California: troubles in San Francisco ==
In 1849 McGowan resolved to head west to California where the discovery of gold had led to the California Gold Rush. In San Francisco he began a career running a roulette wheel on the second floor of a brothel, and made friends with David Broderick, a powerful Tammany Hall Democrat of the northern Irish-Catholic "The Boys" faction. The Democrats managed to get McGowan appointed judge of the Court of Quarter Sessions for San Francisco County. An outbreak of arson, attributed to San Francisco's merchants hoping to convert a surplus of low-priced goods into insurance claims, created a groundswell of public clamour for the imposition of "law and order" to rid the town of the criminals thought to be behind the devastating fires. The merchant class joined the outcry and was instrumental in the creation of the San Francisco Committee of Vigilance. The vigilantes began to take the law into their own hands, even appearing at a courthouse on one occasion demanding the death sentence for a man who had slapped another at a party. The mob was quelled only when McGowan, the other judges and the state governor showed their own weapons.

The Committee of Vigilance operated as a secret society. As the activities of the Committee of Vigilance became increasingly outrageous, it was only a matter of time before there would be a showdown between Judge McGowan and committee members. Four persons were lynched or garotted by "the committee" following secret trial, however when the Committee of Vigilance did turn its sights on McGowan and tried to hound him from his position for the earlier bank robbery matter in Pennsylvania, McGowan forced the committee to back down when he produced proof of his acquittal from the higher court. The Committee of Vigilance disbanded in 1851.

== California: return of the Committee of Vigilance ==
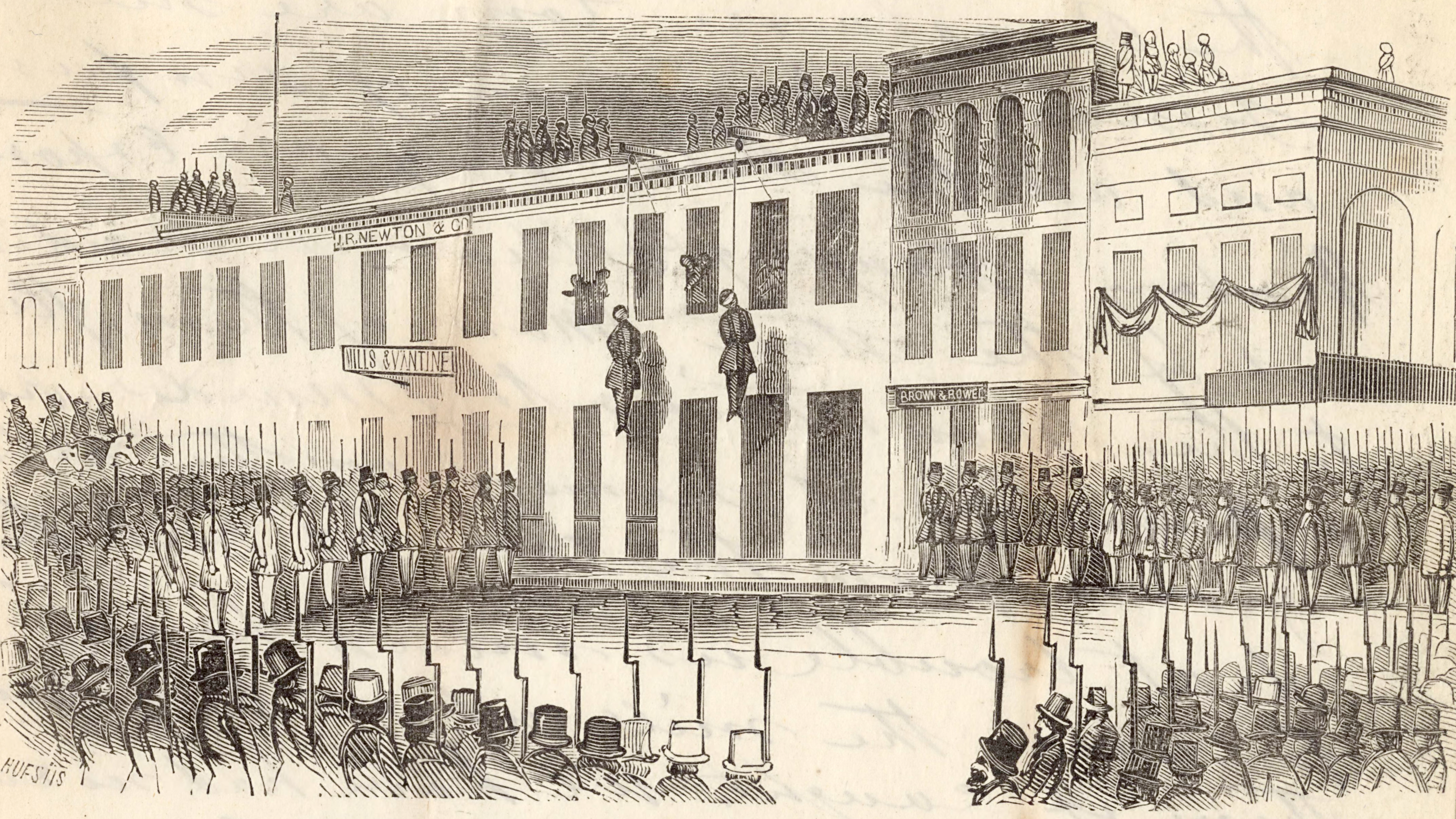
Charles Cora and James Casey are hanged by the Committee of Vigilance, San Francisco, 1856.

In 1855 power shifted in California from the Democrats to the American Party, also known as the Know-Nothings, an anti-Catholic, anti-immigrant movement that had subsided in the East, but was still very much alive in frontier California. The shooting of U.S. deputy marshal General William H. Richardson in November 1855 was to set off a chain of events that would lead to McGowan having to abandon California altogether. Richardson was shot by a gambler named Charles Cora following a confrontation between the gambler and an angry, drunken, pistol-waving Richardson who had been angry at Cora because of a public fight between their respective wives. Cora claimed self-defense. James King of William, editor of the pro-merchant, pro-American Party Bulletin whipped the citizens into a frenzy over the possibility that Cora might not be hung for the death of Richardson, and was driven to frenzy when the jury in the trial couldn't reach a decision. The Sunday Times, published by a former Democrat turned Know-Nothing named James Casey, fanned the problem by including a defamatory insert attacking King of William's brother Tom and the morals of his wife, signed "Caliban", a pen-name known to be used by McGowan. Tom King threatened James Casey. Casey appealed to Judge McGowan, who conveniently lent him his knife and Texas five-shooter. When King of William published a story libelling Casey, claiming he had spent time in prison for stealing furniture for his prostitute mistress, Casey and King of William had a run-in which resulted in King of William being shot by Casey with McGowan's pistol. King of William was not gravely wounded in the altercation, but still died a few days later, probably from dilatory medical care. The Committee of Vigilance was reactivated even before King of William died. A veritable army of 2,500 was gathered instantly. The sheriff guarding the jail where Casey was being held called for help in the face of this build-up of the vigilante army, and McGowan was one of those who came forward. However the American Party state governor of California, James Neely Johnson, allowed the Committee of Vigilance access to the jail, and the committee members quickly seized both Casey and Cora. Notes arrived at McGowan's residence advising him that he was next, and when King of William died and Casey and Cora were summarily executed, Ned McGowan went into hiding.

McGowan escaped San Francisco, using a Mexican disguise, and hid out in various parts of California, narrowly escaping the Committee of Vigilance in Santa Barbara, by having himself rolled into a carpet. Eventually his friends managed to have a special act passed in the California legislature to enable him to be tried in the Napa Valley, far enough away from San Francisco to ensure a fair jury. As expected, McGowan was acquitted, and subsequently founded two newspapers, the Phoenix and the Ubiquitous which he used to expose the sordid and criminal backgrounds of members of the Vigilance Committee. However, the Committee of Vigilance remained powerful in San Francisco, and when McGowan tried to leave California in 1858, news of his departure reached committee members and when he reached San Francisco a warrant had been issued for his arrest and one of the police officers, Jim Boyce, pulled a gun and shot McGowan in front of the courthouse. Fortunately for McGowan the bullet had missed, and despite the general hostility of Vigilance-ridden San Francisco, McGowan managed to escape to the harbour and board the Victoria-bound steamer Pacific.

== British Columbia: McGowan's War ==
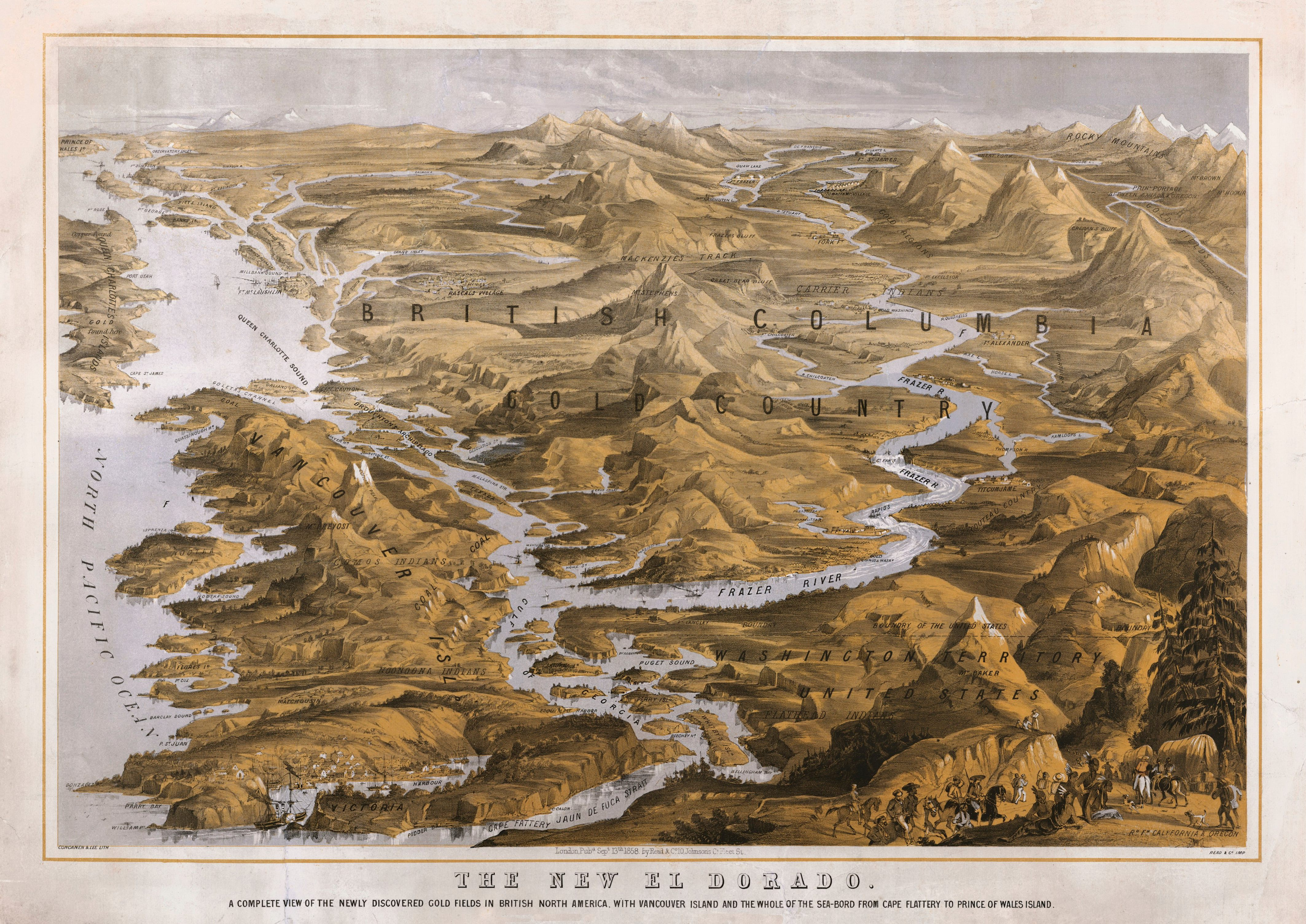
The New Eldorado: "A Complete View of the Newly Discovered Goldfields"

Victoria in 1858 was a city that had seen itself transformed from a tiny village outpost of the British Empire to one of the principal staging centres for the Fraser Canyon Gold Rush. Upon his arrival McGowan met in the street a member of the San Francisco Vigilance Committee (who tried to shoot him) and the colonial governor who warned him that he needed to obey Her Majesty's laws while in British territory. Once on the mainland, in the newly created Colony of British Columbia, McGowan met up with Democrat friends and sympathizers at Hill's Bar, while the Vigilance Committee members gathered around the settlement at Yale up river. It wasn't long before McGowan was in trouble with the law (another fight, with Dr. Max Fifer, a Vigilance Committee member) and implicated in sheltering a man wanted for murder of a British subject at Yale. McGowan then became embroiled in the semi-comical dispute that broke out between the magistrates at Hill's Bar and Yale which saw the constable from Hill's Bar arrested by Peter Whannell, the magistrate at Yale, who was in turn arrested and convicted of contempt of court by George Perrier, the magistrate at Hill's Bar. All of this took place against a backdrop of a summer that had been very tense, with a series of bloody clashes between incoming miners from California, who were mostly American but included Europeans and Britons and others, and the Nlaka'pamux peoples of the Fraser Canyon, during events known as the Fraser Canyon War. Parallel to this were a series of skirmishes along the route of the Okanagan Trail with the Okanagan people of that region, which are seen as an extension of the contemporaneous Yakima War in Washington Territory. Governor Douglas had had enough, and when Whannell sent word of his arrest, warning that the country was in an uproar, and the Victoria correspondents of the San Francisco press (with many papers run by Vigilance Committee members) printing tales of Ned McGowan's outrageous excesses, the Governor decided to send the newly arrived Royal Engineers under Colonel Richard Moody to restore the Queen's Peace. This was accomplished in relatively short order, and without bloodshed, although McGowan's supporters at Hill's Bar did fire upon the Royal Engineers as they made their way up the Fraser River to Yale. McGowan was convicted of assaulting Dr. Fifer before the colony's first judge, Matthew Baillie Begbie, but McGowan charmed everyone, the Colonel, the Judge and the future British Rear Admiral Richard Charles Mayne, then a young lieutenant, with toasts to Queen Victoria and President James Buchanan, (the latter a friend of McGowan's). The incident is known in British Columbia history as McGowan's War.

== Washington, D.C. and Arizona ==
In 1859, tired of struggling against the numerous Vigilance Committee miners on the Fraser, McGowan sold his stake at Hill's Bar for $500 and left British Columbia with $5,000 in gold dust. He returned to the East, and a friend managed to get him a position as assistant sergeant-at-arms in the United States House of Representatives. In 1881 he was out west again, in Tombstone, Arizona, appearing as a witness in a murder trial. He moved to San Francisco and published accounts of his times in British Columbia, as well as a two-part biography of the notorious Parker H. French. Ned McGowan, having outlived almost all of his friends, died in relative poverty on December 8, 1893. He is buried in Holy Cross Catholic Cemetery in Colma, California.
