= Sloquet Hot Springs =

Sloquet Hot Springs Sloquet Sloquet Hotsprings
- .
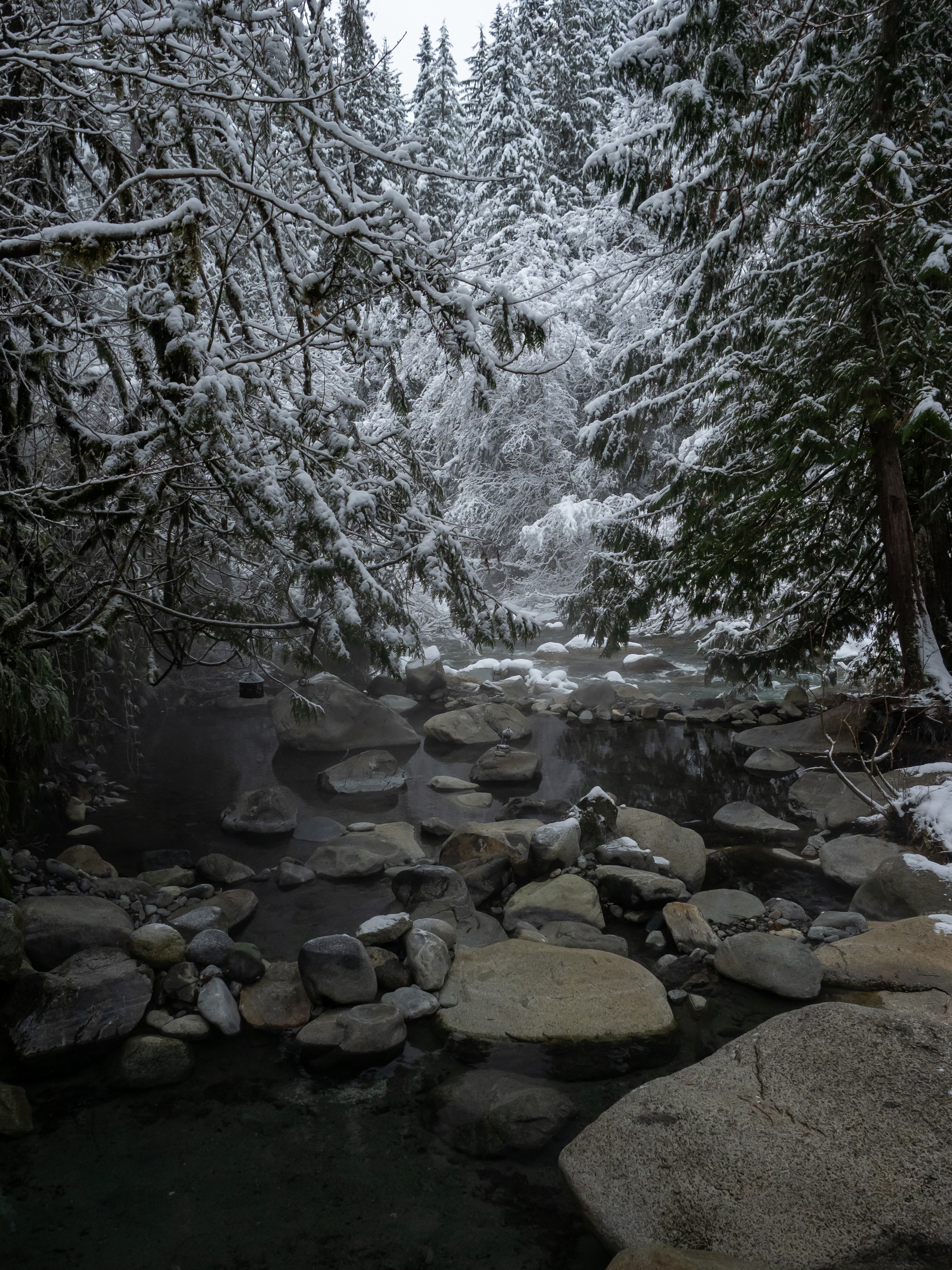

- Location of Sloquet Hot Springs in British Columbia
- Coordinates: 49°43′49″N 122°19′38″W
- Country: Canada
- Province: British Columbia

Government
  - Type: 1st Nation, Indian Band
- Time zone: UTC−07:00 (PT)
- Area code: N/A
- Website: www.sloquethotsprings.ca

Sloquet Hot Springs is a hot spring 100 km (62 mi) south east of Pemberton and Whistler in British Columbia, Canada along the in-SHUCK-ch forest service road and is located in the traditional First Nations community of Xa'xtsa or Douglas First Nation in the community of Tipella, at 78.5 km (48.8 mi) along the in-SHUCK-ch forest service road.

The hot springs are located in a wooded wilderness area that is the traditional land of the Xa'xtsa people or Douglas First Nation. They have used the hot springs since the time before European settlers arrived. The Xa'xtsa continue to use the thermal springs for their traditional ceremonies.

The hot spring emerges at a temperature of 64 °C. A small waterfall of very hot water flows out of the steep vertical bank of Sloquet Creek and flows into two small soaking pools. Downstream is the larger, shallow soaking-pool similar to a typical creek bed but hot. The waters of the upper two pools and the waterfall may be too hot for bathing. Supernatant liquid is a layer of cool water that floats on top of the denser, hot, mineral-rich hot springs outflow. The water should be tested the for temperature by dipping a container into the water before entering the water. Another large soaking pool located further down the creek bed is a more comfortable soaking temperature. An adjacent glacier-fed river provides opportunities for Roman or Turkish style bathing, of alternating hot and cold dips. Camping is available at the site, but there are limited services.

A report on the creek's water chemistry stated it contained: 440 ppm SO4, 375 mg/L SO4, Cl=60 mg/L.
