= Hudson's Bay Brigade Trail =

Historical trail in Canada

The Hudson's Bay Brigade Trail, sometimes referred to simply as the Brigade Trail, refers to one of two routes used by Hudson's Bay Company fur traders to transport furs, goods and supplies between coastal and Columbia District headquarters at Fort Vancouver and those in New Caledonia and also in Rupert's Land. Importantly the route was that used by the annual "Hudson's Bay Express", a shipment of the company books and profits to company headquarters.

The older of the two routes, and the most used, was from Fort Vancouver via the Columbia and Okanagan Rivers to Fort Shuswap (a.k.a. Fort Kamloops, today's City of Kamloops, then via the Bonaparte and Cariboo Plateaus to the Fraser River at Fort Alexandria). From there the Express used river travel via the Peace River to the Prairies and Rupert's Land. Another route used by the Express was the direct to Rupert's Land York Factory Express via the Columbia River to Boat Encampment on that river's Big Bend (beneath today's Kinbasket Lake reservoir) and then via Howse Pass or Athabaska Pass. The route from Fort Kamloops to Fort Alexandria later featured prominently in the migration to the Cariboo goldfields and was known to miners using it as the Brigade Trail. The southern part of the trail, between Forts Vancouver and Kamloops, was at this time known as the Okanagan Trail.

In anticipation of the division of the Columbia District/Oregon Country, the company established a new fort just north of the future boundary at Fort Langley on the lower reaches of the Fraser River and the exploration of alternate routes via British territory for the company fur brigades from the seacoast to the Interior was undertaken. Considered among the new routes were what later became known as the Lakes Route and passes in the southern Canadian Cascades later used by the Dewdney Trail and the Crowsnest Highway, but the most viable route was decided to be a difficult crossing of the Canadian Cascades, over the east wall of the Fraser Canyon just above Spuzzum onto the Thompson Plateau, then to Fort Kamloops. A great deal of money was spent on the route, which was steep and narrow and carved into the mountainside, rising from Kequaloose, which lies opposite Spuzzum on the east bank of the Fraser near today's Alexandra Bridge, and was only used a few times by fur brigades because of its difficulty for pack animals. Most shipments by this route were disastrous. It had fallen into disuse by the time of the Fraser Canyon Gold Rush.

== Hiking trails ==
Portions of the Fraser Canyon route along the Canadian Cascades are maintained as hiking trails by the Fraser Valley Regional District, including the first main ascent from Kequaloose. The Hope Mountain Centre for Outdoor Learning is a volunteer organization that builds and maintains trails along the original Brigade routes including the HBC (1849) Heritage Trail, a 74 km wilderness route from Hope to Tulameen with ten backcountry campsites, and the Tikwalus Heritage Trail, a 10 km trail near Alexandra Bridge that formed part of the 1848 brigade route and also is a traditional route for the Nlakaʼpamux (Thompson) people.

== See also ==
- Canadian canoe routes
- Cariboo Road
- Douglas Road
- River Trail (British Columbia)
- Old Cariboo Road
- Oregon boundary dispute
- Portage La Loche Brigade
- Vidette Lake
- Voyageurs
- Whatcom Trail
