= Emory City =

Canadian town

Coordinates: 49.51°N 121.417°W

Emory City was a town on the Fraser River just 5 km (3 miles) south of Yale, British Columbia.

By 1858 over 25,000 men had travelled up the Fraser River staking claims and working the sand bars in an attempt to strike it rich and 500 men are recorded to have spent the winter of 1858–1859 camped at Emory's bar in tent and shingle dwellings. Although considerable gold was found at Emory's bar, the mother-lode was never found. Emory again came into prominence in the fall of 1879 when it became the Canadian Pacific Railway's western terminus. Emory City soon consisted of 13 streets, 32 blocks, and 400 lots of goodly dimensions. The Inland Sentinel Newspaper, the first on the mainland, erected a two-story building on Front street and the Emory City Sawmill was producing 21,000 board feet (50 m^{3}) of lumber in a 24-hour shift. Two hotels, nine saloons, a brewery, blacksmiths shop, general store, residences and "less reputable businesses" rounded out Emory City's economy. But by late 1881, it became obvious that the CPR would make Yale, their center for railroad activities and Emory City was abandoned. By the late 1890s people traveling through the area said that not a trace of the city could be found as the forest had reclaimed the site.

Today the original site of Emory City is located within a Provincial Campground named "Emory Creek".

== See also ==
List of ghost towns in British Columbia
Fraser Canyon Gold Rush
Canadian Pacific Railway
