= Dewdney Trail =

Trail in British Columbia, Canada

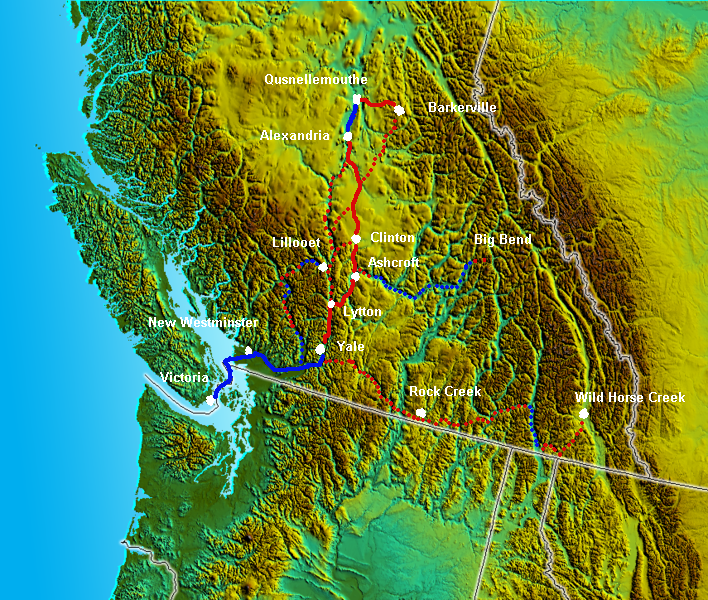
Trails, roads and water routes in colonial British Columbia. The Dewdney Trail is the dotted line across the south of the colony.

The Dewdney Trail is a 720 km (450 mi) trail in British Columbia, Canada, that served as a major thoroughfare in mid-19th century British Columbia. The trail was a critical factor in the development and strengthening of the newly established British colony of British Columbia, tying together mining camps and small towns that were springing up during the gold rush era prior to the colony's joining Canada in 1871. Establishing this route became important and urgent for the colony when many new gold finds occurred at locations near the US border that at the time were much more easily accessed from Washington Territory than from the then barely settled parts of the Lower Mainland and Cariboo. Approximately 80 percent of the trail's route has been incorporated into the Crowsnest Highway.

== Characteristics ==
The trail was built in southern British Columbia and linked what was then Fort Hope (now just Hope) in the southwest to what became Fort Steele in the southeast. Covering a distance of 720 kilometres (450 mi), its purpose was to secure British control of the parts of the colony nearest to the US border, which included the gold finds at Wild Horse Creek and at other points such as Rock Creek. Approximately 80 percent of what is now Highway 3 was originally part of the Dewdney Trail, largely because the terrain allows for no other low-altitude transit of the regions involved.

The route very roughly parallels the Canada-US border along the 49th parallel, and at times reaches elevations of more than 1,200 metres (4,000 ft). It passes through varied scenery, including four major mountain ranges (Cascades, Monashees, Selkirks and Purcells), some major river valleys (Skagit, Similkameen, Okanagan, Kettle, Columbia, Goat, Moyie and Kootenay) and historic townsites such as Hope, Princeton, Grand Forks, Trail, Creston, Yahk, Moyie and Cranbrook.

== Construction and history ==
When gold was discovered in the Similkameen River and Rock Creek area, the governor of the newly established British colony of British Columbia, James Douglas, anxious to protect British interests, decided that a trail should be built to the Interior, and in 1860 the Royal Engineers surveyed a route from Fort Hope to Vermilion Forks (now Princeton). Edgar Dewdney, a Devonshire-born engineer, oversaw the trail's construction, since he and Walter Moberly had won the contract to build it. That first section of 120 km (75 mi) was completed in 1861.

The specifications for the trail were that it be 4 ft (1.2 m) wide, clear of trees and boulders, and any wet sections made passable. The middle 1.5 ft (0.5 m) section was to be smooth and hard, and in areas where there were bluffs, slides or dangerous areas, there had to be enough space for animals and people to get through. Bridges over the many creeks and rivers were to be 12 ft (3.7 m) wide. For this, the builders were paid $496 per mile.

In 1863, gold was discovered in Wild Horse Creek, in the East Kootenays. The then-new governor of British Columbia, Frederick Seymour, believed that the trail should be extended to Wild Horse Creek in order to keep the gold from being transported south via a shorter route into the US, rather than into British coffers. In 1865, Dewdney, then 28 years old, was awarded the contract to build the much longer second section (300 mi (483 km)), in seven months, for $75,000. The second part of the trail passed through wilderness and required the builders to penetrate three mountain ranges.

The route for the second section was surveyed by a crew of the Royal Engineers, with local First Nations people hired to pack supplies over the mountains between Hope and Princeton, covering about 7 mi (11 km) a day. However, at Allison's Ranch, near Princeton, the First Nations porters refused to travel down the Similkameen River; they were paid off, and Dewdney bought a dozen horses from the ranch.

By May 13, 1865, the survey crew had reached So-o-yoyos (called Osoyoos today). They climbed Anarchist Mountain and then continued down into the Kettle River Valley and the settlement of Rock Creek. Rock Creek had been founded during a gold rush, and had initially attracted around 5,000 people, but was nearly deserted when Dewdney and his team passed through. While placer mining continued in Rock Creek until the 1930s, with $200,000 worth of gold being removed, it is believed that the mother lode was never found. They released their exhausted horses in the Kettle River valley near Rock Creek, and with the aid of some Sinixt people, forged eastwards to Christina Lake. Just before the mountains west of present-day Rossland, the group split into two in order to determine the best way across. Dewdney sent former Royal Engineer George Turner and most of the crew up over what is now the Santa Rosa Pass through the Rossland Range to get to Fort Shepherd, built by the Hudson's Bay Company in 1858 on the Columbia River opposite the mouth of the Pend d'Oreille.

Dewdney headed north of Christina Lake with five men, walking over the Rossland Mountains farther north to emerge on the Lower Arrow Lake where they acquired a canoe and paddled down to rejoin the main party at Shepherd on May 27, 1865. While the crew rested, Dewdney and a couple of volunteers paddled back up the Columbia and up the Lower Kootenay River, portaging 14 times to get to the West Arm of Kootenay Lake. After exploring other possible options, Dewdney concluded that Kootenay Lake was too big a barrier to make it a viable route, so he returned to Fort Shepherd.

He ultimately found his way through the mountains, following valleys carved out by streams. He emerged near the spot where Rossland was eventually established. Then he followed what became known as Trail Creek, which emptied into the Columbia River – the city of Trail stands there today.

Some of the crew were then set to working their way westward back up Trail Creek, roughing out the Trail over the Santa Rosa Pass and back to Rock Creek. Meanwhile, Dewdney, ex-Royal Engineer Robert Howell and a small crew crossed the Columbia and travelled up the Pend d’Oreille to the Salmon (now Salmo) River and then up the Lost Creek valley and across the Nelson Range by way of the Kootenay Pass. (Travellers on Highway 3 today still cross by this route, also known as the Salmo-Creston pass.) Then they headed down Summit Creek into what is now called the Creston Valley in the East Kootenays.

Next they crossed the swampy territory of the Purcell Trench at the head of Kootenay Lake, before crossing the Purcell Mountains via Duck Creek. Travelling down the eastern side via the Goat River, they eventually intersected the Walla Walla Trail at Yahk in the Moyie River valley. The crew must have been elated to reach the Walla Walla Trail, since it was the main route into the US. From there it was a relatively easy walk along the Walla Walla, and they arrived at Galbraith's Ferry, near Fisherville, in early June.

Dewdney hired William Fernie and 65 men to start construction of the trail, heading back to the west. (The East Kootenay town of Fernie is named for Mr. Fernie.) He received $25,000 in cash and gold dust to pay the crew, and had a nasty moment after he had cached the money in a tree stump while guiding Chief Justice Matthew Baillie Begbie from Summit Creek over a particularly boggy area as Begbie travelled to Fisherville (a mining town that had grown up near the gold strike), where he was going to preside over court. When Dewdney returned for the purse, he initially thought it had been taken – it had vanished and the stump in which he had cached it was shattered. But it transpired that the weight of the purse had broken the stump, and Dewdney found it as he hacked frantically at the stump.

By September, pack trains were travelling the trail to Wild Horse. By 1866, the best of the gold was largely gone from the Wild Horse strike, and miners dismantled Fisherville to try to mine underneath it. In its heyday, the town boasted government offices, saloons, stores and a brewery, and housed 5,000 people or more.

== See also ==
- Douglas Road
- Cariboo Road
- River Trail
- Whatcom Trail
- Okanagan Trail
- Rock Creek Gold Rush
- Crowsnest Highway
- Hudson's Bay Brigade Trail
