= Douglas Road =

Gold rush–era route in British Columbia, Canada

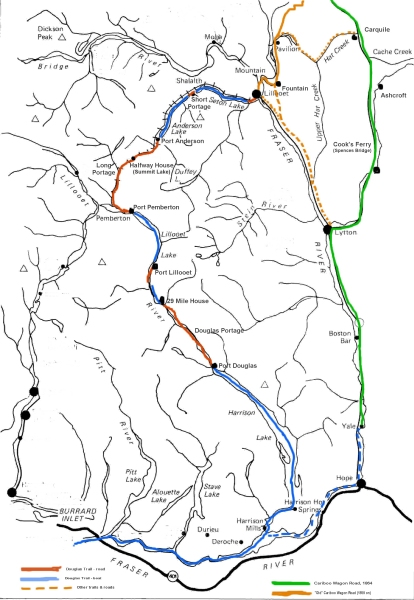
Route of the Douglas Road (water portions in blue, land portions in red) and the Cariboo Road (green)

The Douglas Road, a.k.a. the Lillooet Trail, Harrison Trail or Lakes Route, was a gold rush–era transportation route from the British Columbia Coast to the Interior (NB another route known as the Lillooet Trail was the Lillooet Cattle Trail, which used some of the same route but was built 25 years later). Over 30,000 men are reckoned to have travelled the route in, although by the end of the 1860s it was virtually abandoned due to the construction of the Cariboo Wagon Road, which bypassed the region.

== History ==
Originally traversed by Hudson's Bay Company employees in 1828 and charted by HBC explorer Alexander Caulfield Anderson in 1846, the route was heavily travelled by prospectors seeking to avoid the dangers of the Fraser Canyon to access the gold-bearing bars of the Fraser around today's Lillooet. Pressure for an alternative route to the Upper Fraser had mounted in the wake of the Fraser Canyon War of the winter of 1859, and miners were wary of travelling through the territory of the Nlaka'pamux (Thompson Indians), even though the war was over.

Thousands had travelled the route already, in nightmarish conditions including heavy rain and even heavier infestations of mosquitos, when Governor Sir James Douglas decided to formalize the route with the construction of a wagon road over the land portions in order to avert starvation among the thousands already on the upper Fraser. As one of the first acts of the newly incorporated Colony of British Columbia, the Governor commissioned the building of the road in an unusual road-development scheme whereby men willing to work on the road would invest twenty-five dollars each, which would be paid back in goods upon reaching Cayoosh (Lillooet).

In 1858 five hundred men, in two teams of two hundred fifty, a cosmopolitan mix of British, Americans, Chinese, Mexicans, Scandinavians, Kanakas (Hawaiians), Germans and others signed up for the job. Controversy erupted at the end of construction over whether prices at the Port Douglas end of the trail or the more expensive rates at Lillooet would be used to reckon the reimbursement as promised. The Governor settled finally on the cheaper Port Douglas prices.

But the construction work was of very poor condition, such that when the Royal Engineers resurveyed the route a year later it was unusable, and further public funds were dedicated to fixing and improving it, adding bridges and taking down steep hills. Despite their efforts the route was little-used by 1861 or so, although it remained in use by locals and the occasional traveller for years afterwards. Regular steamer service to and from Port Douglas ended in the 1890s, although small-steamer traffic on Anderson and Seton Lakes continued for decades after, ending on Seton Lake only in the 1950s.

== Route ==
Starting at Port Douglas (now abandoned), a trail led to 25 Mile House (abandoned and lost). From there a route by boat and road went to Port Pemberton. A trail then went into Pemberton and made a wide turn to Port Anderson. From there, another water to road route went straight to Lillooet, where it joined the old Cariboo Road.

=== Description ===
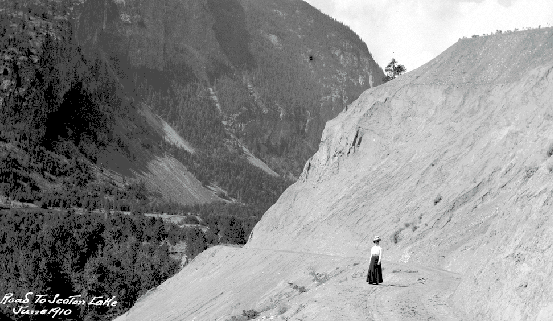
The last leg of the Douglas Road, near Lillooet, June 1910 (Photo: Frank Swannell

The route begins at Port Douglas, British Columbia, at the head of Harrison Lake and the head of river navigation from the Strait of Georgia. From there a land portion of the route follows the lower Lillooet River to Port Lillooet at the south end of Lillooet Lake, where steamers and canoes carried travellers to Port Pemberton, at the mouth of the Birkenhead River near present-day Mount Currie.

The next land portion of the route, known as the Long Portage or the Pemberton Portage, follows the lower Birkenhead River then diverges from it to Birken Lake (a.k.a. Summit Lake or Gates Lake) and then via the Gates River to present-day D'Arcy at the head of Anderson Lake, then known as Port Anderson. From there a motley variety of watercraft, including the "Lady of The Lake", a small steamer and the ubiquitous native canoe, ferried travellers to the Short Portage (today known as Seton Portage). There packers and ultimately a short mule-drawn "railway" shuttled men and freight to the head of Seton Lake, where another collection of steamers carried them to the foot of that lake and a final five-mile wagon road to the boomtowns of Cayoosh Flat, Parsonville and Marysville (today's Lillooet).

In response to the Cariboo Gold Rush, a toll road from there to Fort Alexandria was built by entrepreneur Gustavus Blin Wright, followed the Fraser Canyon for about twenty miles, then cut up eastwards onto the Cariboo Plateau via the town of Clinton, where the later Cariboo Wagon Road met the older route. Lillooet was numbered as "Mile 0" of this road, with its roadhouses taking their name from their distance from a certain point on Lillooet's Main Street.

== See also ==
- Cariboo camels
- Vessels of the Lakes Route
- Cariboo Road
- Old Cariboo Road
- Whatcom Trail
- Okanagan Trail
- River Trail
- Lillooet Cattle Trail
- Dewdney Trail
- Hudson's Bay Brigade Trail
