= Lillooet Cattle Trail =

The Lillooet Cattle Trail, also known as the Lillooet-Burrard Cattle Trail and also as the Lillooet Trail, was an unusual and daring public works undertaking by the Province of British Columbia in the 1877, and was the largest 19th century public works expenditure at $35,000 of the new province since it joined Canada in 1871.

== History ==
Faced with burgeoning stock populations in the Pemberton-Lillooet and Gang Ranch areas and a lack of easy access to the huge market supplying meat to construction crews of the Canadian Pacific Railway just east, largely because of a lack of bridge crossings of the Fraser River, the ranchers of the Lillooet area lobbied the provincial government, and MLA Humphreys, to finance a trail to the coast via the Pemberton and Squamish areas to the north shore of Burrard Inlet (i.e. what is now Vancouver harbour), at the mouth of the Seymour River.

The trail's route was improbable, to say the least, hugging seaside cliffs where, in places, trestles and floating platforms had to be built out above or onto the ocean and, beyond that, through marshes and heavy forests beset by infamously thick mosquitos and, lastly, a tortuous "stairway" section of the trail over the pass between the Squamish area and the head of the Seymour River, where cattle were expected to use steps on a trail that was nowhere more than 6 yards wide.

Only one formal cattle drive was ever held over the full length of the route and most head were lost; those that finished the trip were put out to pasture to recuperate, being too skinny to be worth butchering. The multi-thousand-dollar loss incurred by trail construction left a bad taste with the provincial government for many years, although the son of its main sponsor, a rancher from Pavilion, later became provincial Minister of Highways and Public Works. Bridges to serve the cattle ranches of the West Fraser, including the suspension-span at Lillooet, were built in several places by the 1910s, although too late to keep the West Fraser Ranches competitive with those in the Thompson and Cariboo regions.

The trail remained in use in later years for residents of the Pemberton Valley for general travel purposes, and at least two more smaller cattle drives from that region to Squamish were attempted, both financial disasters as was the original one from Lillooet. The roadbed of the trail remained in place for many years, its stretch from Pemberton to Squamish ultimately being subsumed into the grade for the construction of the Pacific Great Eastern Railway through that stretch.

== Route ==
Basically the route started from North Vancouver to Lillooet. The trail went through Britannia, Squamish, Garibaldi to Pemberton. From here it followed the Douglas Road, but at this time the water routes were replaced with roads and the trail made it all the way to Lillooet.

== See also ==
- Douglas Road
- Old Cariboo Road
- Cariboo Road
- Dozier's Way
- Hudson's Bay Brigade Trail
- River Trail
