= List of bloodless wars =

A bloodless war is generally a small conflict, crisis, or dispute between rival groups that is resolved without human death or injury, though the threat of violence may seem likely at the time. Intentional property damage, however, may still occur. Such events may be referred to as wars, though the term "war" generally implies violence. Therefore, the term "bloodless war" is somewhat of an oxymoron.

== Bloodless wars ==
The following is a list of bloodless wars:

Name	Location	Start	End	Belligerents		References
Huéscar-Danish War, as part of the Peninsular War	Huéscar	11 November 1809	11 November 1981	Huéscar municipality, Spain	Denmark	
McGowan's War	Yale, British Columbia	1858		Colony of British Columbia	American gold miners	
Kettle War	River Scheldt	8 October 1784		Habsburg monarchy	Dutch Republic	
Aroostook War	Maine–New Brunswick border	1838	1839	Maine	(United Kingdom of Great Britain and Ireland) New Brunswick	
Dodge City War	Dodge City, Kansas, United States	June 1883		Luke Short	Mayor Lawrence E. Deger	
Red River Bridge War	Texas–Oklahoma border	1931		Texas	Oklahoma	
Lobster War	Waters of Pernambuco, Brazil	1961	1963	Fourth Brazilian Republic	Fifth French Republic	
Honey War	Iowa–Missouri border	1839		Iowa Territory	Missouri	
Anglo-Swedish war of 1810-1812	—N/a	17 November 1810	18 July 1812	(United Kingdom of Great Britain and Ireland) United Kingdom	Sweden	
Three Hundred and Thirty Five Years' War	—N/a	30 March 1651	17 April 1986	Dutch Republic	Isles of Scilly	
Pig War (1859)	San Juan Islands, United States	15 June 1859	October 1859	Washington Territory	(United Kingdom of Great Britain and Ireland) Colony of Vancouver Island	
Sumdorong Chu standoff	Sumdorong Chu valley	1986	May 1987	India	China	
Turbot War	Grand Banks of Newfoundland; English Channel	March 9, 1995	April 16, 1995	Canada	Spain	
Whisky War	Hans Island	1973	2022	Canada	Denmark	

== Incorrectly categorized wars ==
The following wars are often labelled incorrectly as bloodless wars:

- Cold War: unknown number of killed
- Cod Wars: one man killed, two men wounded
- Toledo War: one man wounded
- Battle of Athens (1946): several wounded
- Conquest of New Netherland: three killed
- Invasion of the Gambia: initial invasion was bloodless, first casualties were reported during the occupation and stabilization period

== See also ==
- Nonviolent revolution
- Frozen conflict
