= Tipella =

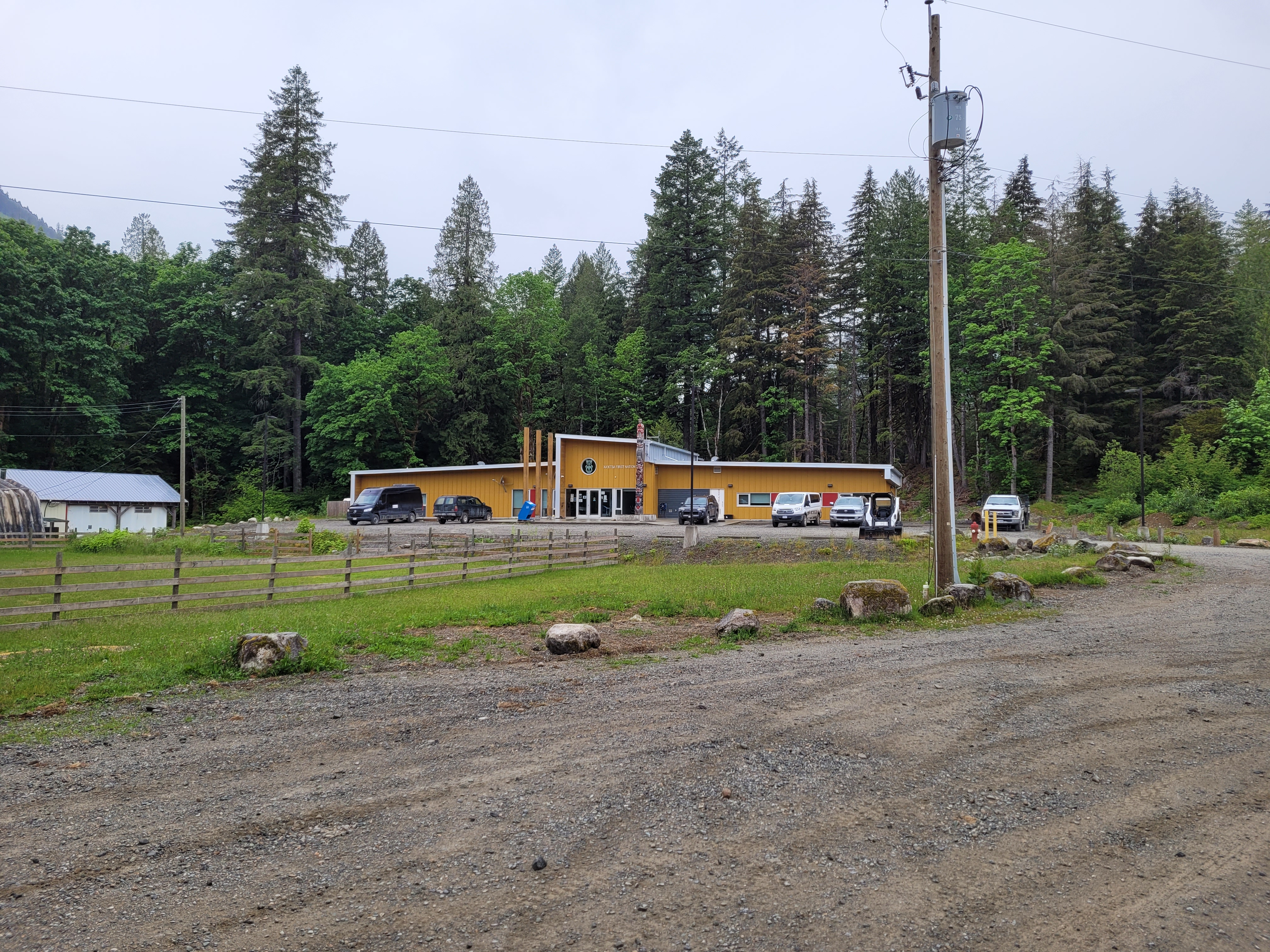
- Xa'xtsa First Nations band office - near Tipella

- Location of Tipella in British Columbia
- Coordinates: 49°44′00″N 122°09′00″W
- Country: Canada
- Province: British Columbia
- Area codes: 250, 778

Tipella, also historically known as Tipella City, is a locality near the head of Harrison Lake in southwestern British Columbia, Canada. A real estate venture from the early 20th Century, the development of a "city" never came to fruition though the placename remains on maps today, and is the name of the airstrip nearby, which serves Port Douglas and nearby logging camps. It is also the source of the name of Tipella Indian Reserve No. 7, which is one of the reserves of the Douglas First Nation, and of Tipella Creek, which enters Harrison Lake at the foot of the locality.
