= Old Cariboo Road =

Historic road in British Columbia, Canada

The Old Cariboo Road is a reference to the original wagon road to the Cariboo gold fields in what is now the Canadian province of British Columbia. It should not be confused with the Cariboo Road, which was built slightly later and used a different route.

It was built from Lillooet to Alexandria, beginning in 1859, and was a precursor to the slightly later Cariboo Wagon Road that was built from Yale via Cache Creek-Ashcroft. Access to the start of the road at Lillooet was made by the Douglas Road or Lakes Route from Port Douglas, at the head of Harrison Lake.

It is the mileages from Lillooet on the Old Cariboo Road, properly known as the Lillooet-Alexandria Road, that the "road house" placenames of British Columbia, such as 100 Mile House, are measured. The road was a toll-route and built by private contractor Gustavus Blin-Wright, a prominent British-Swedish entrepreneur in colonial British Columbia who also contracted to build roads and provide steamer services in the Kootenay region. Blin-Wright also operated the steamer which connected the end of the road at Alexandria with Quesnel (then Quesnellemouthe).

When the Cariboo Road proper was built, it converged with the existing route of the Old Cariboo Road at Clinton, and followed the earlier road to Alexandria, but was extended up the Fraser from there to Quesnel (thereby eliminating the need for steamer travel on that stretch of the upper Fraser) and completed eastward from there to Barkerville.

It was along this route that an attempt was made to use Bactrian camels purchased from the U.S. Camel Corps for freight, and also a tractor-style Thomson Road Steamer known as a "road train", one of the earliest motorized vehicles.

== The Old Cariboo Trail ==
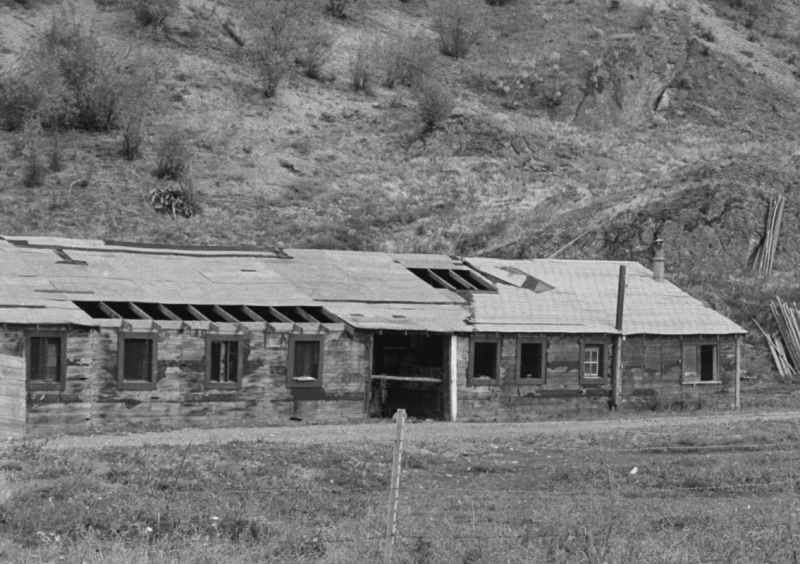
12 Mile Roadhouse, Fountain (burned down 1980s)

From Wallula Gap on the Columbia River, the Old Cariboo Trail was built over the route of the Hudson's Bay Brigade Trail, which began at Fort Okanagan, near the Wallula Gap area on the Columbia River and passed north through Eastern Washington along the Columbia River to the Okanogan River and north into British Columbia.

Hudson's Bay Company fur traders brigades followed this route up until 1847, when the Hudson's Bay Company withdrew from the Northwest. Cattle drives were common along this trail to supply the gold miners, who arrived in British Columbia in the late 1850s.

In Washington Territory a wagon road from Wallula (Fort Nez Percés near Walla Walla) to the gold mining regions of British Columbia was known as the "Cariboo Trail" or the "Wallula-Okanogan Road". Connecting to the Oregon Trail at Wallula, it ran north across Quincy Flats past Moses Lake, then crossed the lower Grand Coulee at present day Coulee City. From there it turned north and crossed the Waterville Plateau to reach the Columbia River near Fort Okanogan. From there it followed the valley of the Okanagan River into Canada, connecting with the Okanagan Trail. The section known in Canada as the Cariboo Trail departed from the northernmost of the Okanagan Trail routes near today's Savona to head up the Deadman River towards the initial strikes near Likely and Horsefly, British Columbia.

== Route ==
The Old Cariboo Road started at Lillooet (or 0 Mile House) where it directly went to Alexandria. From there a steamboat service was provided to Quesnellemouthe (now Quesnel) where it ended. A trail from there then went east to Barkerville where gold was discovered. From Lillooet there was a trail that went south to Lytton. This was part of the Old Cariboo Road that avoided the Fraser Canyon. By 1864 a new Cariboo road was built, which took a different route, although from Clinton to Alexandria much of the Old Cariboo Road was used for the newer Cariboo Road.

== See also ==
- Douglas Road
- Cariboo Road
- Lillooet Cattle Trail
- Hudson's Bay Brigade Trail
- River Trail
- Old Cariboo Highway
- Cariboo Highway
