= Port Douglas, British Columbia =

Port Douglas
- Location of Port Douglas in British Columbia
- Coordinates: 49°46′15″N 122°09′51″W
- Country: Canada
- Province: British Columbia

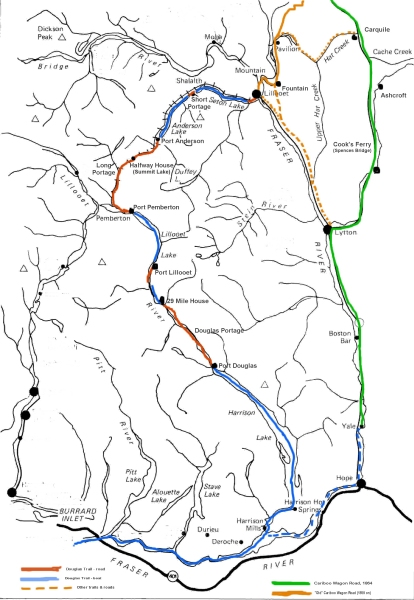
Route of the Douglas Road (water portions in blue, land portions in red) and the Cariboo Road (green), location of Port Douglas is near centre of map

Port Douglas, sometimes referred to simply as Douglas, is a remote community in British Columbia, Canada at east of the mouth of the Lillooet River, and at the head of Harrison Lake, which is the head of river navigation from the Strait of Georgia. Port Douglas was the second major settlement of any size on the British Columbia mainland (after Yale) during the Fraser Canyon Gold Rush. It came into being in 1858 when Governor Douglas ordered that it be laid out.

From Port Douglas to Lillooet a mixed land and water route was built, named the Douglas Road, a.k.a. the Lillooet Trail, Harrison Trail or Lakes Route. During its rowdy heyday, Port Douglas's population numbered in the thousands, and many of the B.C. mainland's first companies had their start here, including the famous B.X. Express and other freighting companies that relocated to the Fraser Canyon with the completion of the Cariboo Wagon Road in the mid-1860s.

Port Douglas dwindled in size rapidly with the abandonment of the Douglas Road. Today, there is a small population of 10 people, and 3 inhabitable homes. There is a playground and a public washroom.

A land alienation pattern on the lakeshore to the southwest of Douglas, across the mouth of the Lillooet River and down the lake a bit, remains on the map as Tipella City (also known as Tipella, or Tipella Hot Springs).

It was a port and land-promotion scheme from 1898 that never went far, although a number of investors and buyers were taken in by it. The port was a wharf for the Moneyspinner silver mine at Fire Lake which operated for a few years.

Regular steamboat traffic to Port Douglas from Georgia Strait and New Westminster via the Fraser River ended in the 1890s, although the town was already in decline, only a handful of non-native residents remained. In the 1970s, a large logging operation bulldozed the last remains of the town, which were only vestiges of a few foundations.

Both Port Douglas and the Douglas Road, as well as the Douglas Ranges to the west of Harrison Lake, were named in honour of the first governor of the Colony of British Columbia, Sir James Douglas.

The Indian reserve community of Xa'xtsa, home to the Douglas First Nation, who are part of the St'at'imc cultural group but have many ties to the Sto:lo of the Lower Mainland, is located on Douglas Indian Reserve No. 8 which is across Little Harrison Lake, as the bay which became the site of the steamer port is known, from the location of what had been Port Douglas proper. The name Port Douglas today generally refers to that community and its location, as nothing remains of the frontier-era town.

== See also ==
- Vessels of the Lakes Route
