= Okanagan Trail =

Coordinates: 45.6215°N 122.6650°W

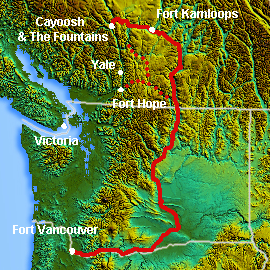
Route of the Okanagan Trail. Dotted lines are alternate routes to the lower Fraser Canyon

The Okanagan Trail was an inland route to the Fraser Canyon Gold Rush from the Lower Columbia region of the Washington and Oregon Territories in 1858–1859. It became a trail for miners, including Americans from California who were prospecting for gold.

The route was essentially the same as that used by the Hudson's Bay Company fur brigades, which traded with the local Salish Indians. It followed the Columbia River to the confluence of the Okanogan River, and then up that river's watercourse via Osoyoos, Skaha (Dog) and Okanagan lakes, then using a pass via Monte Creek to Fort Kamloops, at the confluence of the North and South Thompson rivers. From there, the route went west down the Thompson River either to the lower gold-bearing bars of the Fraser River between what is now Lytton, British Columbia and Yale, British Columbia, or via Hat Creek and Marble Canyon to the upper Fraser goldfields around present-day Lillooet, British Columbia. A shorter branch-route to the lower Thompson and lower Fraser Canyon diverged from the main route at the confluence of the Similkameen River and the Okanogan (at present-day Oroville, Washington).

During the Fraser Canyon Gold Rush, the Shuswap Country saw an influx of foreigners through the Okanagan Trail. These then travelled to Tkemlups and northward along the trails to the Cariboo region.

Cayoosh and The Fountains are today's Lillooet, British Columbia and environs. The trail today still exists for tourists to drive along and make stops along the way.

== Pre-gold rush history ==
During the end of the last ice age, melt water carved flat-bottomed "back valleys" into the Okanagan valley, which made smooth terrain that bypassed difficult-to-traverse features. This geographic feature was first used as a trade route by native people. Widespread trade by native people included coastal eulachon fish oil, salmon pemmican, and—especially after the introduction of horses to the region by the 1730s—plains goods such as buffalo hides and parfleches. The Okanagan people were important middlemen in this trade network.

The initial use of the Okanagan trail by Europeans was driven by the fur trade, and particularly the desire to establish a more local route than sending goods from the plateau region to Hudson's Bay or Montreal. In 1810, businessman John Jacob Astor established the Pacific Fur Company to facilitate fur trade from the North West Coast and Russia to China, and then purchase in-demand Chinese goods for sale in London. Meanwhile, David Thompson of the competing North West Company travelled through the Rockies to established Kootanae House on the upper Columbia river, and then explored the region and make his way to the mouth of the Columbia.

Thompson met a Pacific Fur Company team building a fort at the mouth of the Columbia in June 1811. Shortly thereafter, a joint expedition between the two companies back up the Cascades was launched. From this expedition, trade posts were set up and substantial trade began between the Europeans and natives.

In 1813, John Stuart of the North West Company travelled from Stuart Lake to Fort Kamloops, Fort Okanagan, and finally the mouth of the Columbia, establishing a viable trade route. This route was used irregularly by the North West Company until the British government pressured it to merge with the Hudson's Bay Company. In 1825, the Hudson's Bay Company decided to reinstate the route, establishing the "brigade route".

The brigade route began with the spring melt in the plateau. As the ice thawed in April, traders and goods began to migrate from their isolated winter outposts towards Alexandria on horses and canoes. From there, they moved south down the Thompson river to Fort Kamloops, then on to Fort Vancouver. The traders tended to arrive in June, shortly after a "London ship" carrying supplies for the outposts arrived to take their goods. When the Hudson's Bay Company first sent horses to Alexandria in 1825 for the first brigade run in 2026, so many died that replacements were needed in the spring; a breeding program was established in Alexandria to furnish future replacements.

The route first established by Stuart in 1813 remained largely unchanged for the next 20 years, except that in 1846 the establishment of the 49th parallel required the rerouting of the route down the Fraser River instead of the Okanagan river to keep it within British territory.

== See also ==
- Whatcom Trail
- Yakima War
- Cayuse War
- Fraser Canyon War
- Dewdney Trail
- Douglas Road
- Old Cariboo Road
- Cariboo Road
- Similkameen Trail
- River Trail
- Hudson's Bay Brigade Trail
- Columbia District
- Oregon boundary dispute
- Oregon Country
- Oregon Treaty
- Oregon Territory
- Fort Vancouver
