= Hill's Bar =

Extinct town in British Columbia

Coordinates: 49°32′00″N 121°26′00″W

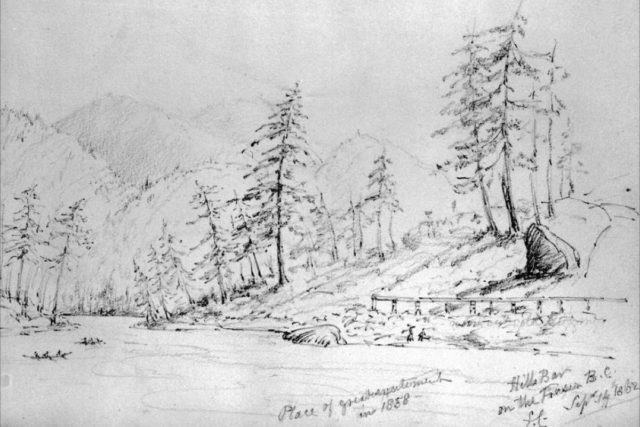

Hill's Bar is a long-abandoned ghost town located in the Fraser Canyon region of British Columbia, Canada. The site of the former boomtown is situated near the right bank of the Fraser River, between Yale and the mouth of Emory Creek. The eponymous bar was the first active placer mining site at the onset of the Fraser Canyon Gold Rush, and was the scene of the Boatmakers of San Francisco claim, which included Ned McGowan of McGowan's War, and involved a dispute with Kowpelst (White Hat), chief of the Spuzzum people.
