= Nonviolent revolution =

Civil resistance to bring about the departure of governments

A nonviolent revolution is a revolution conducted primarily by unarmed civilians using tactics of civil resistance, including various forms of nonviolent protest, to bring about the departure of governments seen as entrenched and authoritarian without the use or threat of violence. While many campaigns of civil resistance are intended for much more limited goals than revolution, generally a nonviolent revolution is characterized by simultaneous advocacy of democracy, human rights, and national independence in the country concerned.

An effective campaign of civil resistance, and even the achievement of a nonviolent revolution, may be possible in a particular case despite the government in power taking brutal measures against protesters. The commonly held belief that most revolutions that have happened in dictatorial regimes were bloody or violent uprisings is not borne out by historical analysis. Nonviolent Revolutions came to the international forefront in the 20th century by the independence movement of India under the leadership of Gandhi with civil disobedience being the tool of nonviolent resistance. An important non-violent revolution was in Sudan in October 1964 which overthrew a military dictatorship. Later it became more successful and more common in the 1980s as Cold War political alliances which supported status quo governance waned.

In the 1970s and 1980s, intellectuals in the Soviet Union and other Communist states, and in some other countries, began to focus on civil resistance as the most promising means of opposing entrenched authoritarian regimes. The use of various forms of unofficial exchange of information, including by samizdat, expanded. Two major revolutions during the 1980s strongly influenced political movements that followed. The first was the 1986 People Power Revolution in the Philippines, from which the term 'people power' came to be widely used, especially in Hispanic and Asian nations. Three years later, the Revolutions of 1989 that ousted communist regimes in the Eastern Bloc reinforced the concept (with the notable exception of the notoriously bloody Romanian Revolution), beginning with the victory of Solidarity in that year's Polish legislative elections. The Revolutions of 1989 provided the template for the so-called color revolutions in mainly post-communist states, which tended to use a color or flower as a symbol, somewhat in the manner of the Velvet Revolution in Czechoslovakia.

In December 1989, inspired by the anti-communist revolutions in Eastern Europe, the Mongolian Democratic Union (MDU) organized popular street protests and hunger strikes against the communist regime. In 1990, dissidents in the Azerbaijan Soviet Socialist Republic started civil resistance against the government, but were initially crushed by the Soviet Armed Forces in the Black January massacre.

Recent nonviolent revolutions include the Orange Revolution in Ukraine, which was highlighted by a series of acts of civil disobedience, sit-ins, and general strikes organized by the opposition movement.

== Overview ==
Historical examples of nonviolent resistance for significant political change go back as far as Ancient Rome. The majority plebeian class of Rome held general strikes and abandoned the city to force changes in the written constitution of the Republic.

Nonviolent revolution was popularized in the 20th century by the satyagraha philosophy of Mahatma Gandhi, who guided the people of India to independence from Britain. Despite the violence of the Partition of India following independence, and numerous revolutionary uprisings which were not under Gandhi's control, India's independence was achieved through legal processes after a period of national resistance rather than through a military revolution.

According to the socialist Fourth International, Karl Marx acknowledged a theoretical possibility of "peaceful" revolutions, but the Fourth International articles also say "The development and preservation of good relations with the military forces is one of the absolute priorities of preparatory revolutionary work". Some have argued that a nonviolent revolution would require fraternisation with military forces, like in the relatively nonviolent Portuguese Carnation Revolution.

== Peaceful revolution ==
A peaceful revolution or bloodless coup is an overthrow of a government that occurs without violence. If the revolutionists refuse to use violence, it is known as a nonviolent revolution. If the revolutionists are willing to use force, but the loyalists (government) negotiate or surrender to divert armed conflict, it is called a bloodless war.

Peaceful revolutions that have occurred are the Carnation Revolution of 1974 in Portugal, the People Power Revolution of 1986 in the Philippines, and the Peaceful Revolution of 1989 in Germany.

== As it relates to democracy ==
One theory of democracy is that its main purpose is to allow peaceful revolutions. The idea is that majorities voting in elections approximate the result of a coup. In 1962, John F. Kennedy famously said, "Those who make peaceful revolution impossible will make violent revolution inevitable."

George Lakey in his 1973 book and in his 1976 "A Manifesto for Nonviolent Revolution", laid out a five-stage strategy for nonviolent revolution:

- Stage 1 – Cultural Preparation or "Conscientization": Education, training and consciousness raising of why there is a need for a nonviolent revolution and how to conduct a nonviolent revolution.
- Stage 2 – Building Organizations: As training, education and consciousness raising continues, the need to form organizations. Affinity groups or nonviolent revolutionary groups are organized to provide support, maintain nonviolent discipline, organize and train other people into similar affinity groups and networks.
- Stage 3 – Confrontation: Organized and sustained campaigns of picketing, strikes, sit-ins, marches, boycotts, die-ins, blockades to disrupt business as usual in institutions and government. By putting one's body on the line nonviolently the rising movement stops the normal gears of government and business.
- Stage 4 – Mass Non Cooperation: Similar affinity groups and networks of affinity groups around the country and world, engage in similar actions to disrupt business as usual.
- Stage 5 – Developing Parallel Institutions to take over functions and services of government and commerce. In order to create a new society without violence, oppression, environmental destruction, discrimination and one that is environmentally sustainable, nonviolent, democratic, equitable, tolerant, and fair, alternative organizations and structures including businesses must be created to provide the needed services and goods that citizens of a society need.

Gene Sharp, who influenced many in the Arab Spring revolutions, has documented and described over 198 different methods of nonviolent action that nonviolent revolutionaries might use in struggle. He argues that no government or institution can rule without the consent of the governed or oppressed as that is the source of nonviolent power. Mahatma Gandhi and Martin Luther King Jr. argued this as well.

== List of nonviolent revolutions by era ==
=== Decolonization ===
Dates	Nonviolent revolution	Notes
1918	Egyptian revolution	An attempt to overthrow British colonial rule.
1919	March 1st Movement	Korea in an attempt to annul the Japan-Korea Treaty of 1910 and declare independence.
1930	Salt Satyagraha in India	An attempt to overthrow British colonial rule.
1942	Quit India movement	Movement dedicated to Indian independence from British rule.

=== Cold War ===
==== In nations of the Warsaw Pact ====
Dates	Nonviolent revolution	Notes
1968	The Prague Spring	
1989	The Revolutions of 1989	Even though many of these revolutions did not take place entirely in 1989, they are usually grouped together as such.
1980–1989	The Solidarity movement	popular resistance to communist rule, though progress is halted by the imposition of martial law.
1987–1989/1991	The Singing Revolution	a cycle of singing mass demonstrations, followed by a living chain across the Baltic states (Estonia, Lithuania, Latvia), known as the Baltic Way.
1989	The Peaceful Revolution	in the German Democratic Republic leading to the fall of the Berlin Wall
1989	The Velvet Revolution	– the bloodless revolution in Czechoslovakia leading to the downfall of the communist government there.
1989	The bloodless revolution in Bulgaria	led to the resulted in the downfall of the communist government.
1990	The Golaniad	a protest in Romania in April by Bucharest students who demanded a non-communist government. The protests ended in bloodshed after an intervention of miners called in by President Ion Iliescu (June 1990 Mineriad).
1991	1991 Soviet coup d'état attempt	led to the effect of a revolution, was mostly non-violent.

==== Outside of the Warsaw Pact ====
Dates	Nonviolent revolution	Country
1964	The October Revolution	Sudan
1952	The Egyptian Revolution	Egypt
1969	The al-Fateh Revolution	Libya
1973	The 1973 Afghan coup d'état	Afghanistan
1974	The Carnation Revolution	Portugal
1985	The April Intifada	Sudan
1986	The People Power Revolution	Philippines
1990	The Mongolian Revolution of 1990	Mongolia

=== Post–Cold War period ===
==== Colour revolutions ====
These are revolutions in post-communist authoritarian Europe and other new countries that were part of the former Soviet Union or Warsaw Pact. Each of these had massive street protests and/or followed disputed elections and led to the resignation or overthrow of leaders considered by their opponents to be authoritarian. Almost all of them used a particular colour or a flower to be their symbol of unity.

- 2000 – The Bulldozer Revolution in Yugoslavia, which led to the overthrow of Slobodan Milošević. These demonstrations are considered by many to be the first example of the revolutions that followed in Georgia and Ukraine; however, the Serbs adopted an approach that had already been used in parliamentary elections in Slovakia and Croatia in 1998 and 2000, respectively, characterized by civic mobilization through get-out-the-vote campaigns and unification of the political opposition. The protesters in Serbia didn't adopt a colour or specific symbol (the most recognizable symbol of the revolution was a stylized fist), and despite the commonalities, many others refer to Georgia as the most definite beginning of the series of "colour revolutions." The demonstrations were supported by youth movement Otpor!.
- 2003 – The Rose Revolution in Georgia, following the disputed 2003 Georgia legislative election, led to the overthrow of Eduard Shevardnadze and his replacement by Mikhail Saakashvili after new elections were held in March 2004. The Rose Revolution was supported by the civic resistance movement, Kmara.
- 2004 – The Orange Revolution in Ukraine, followed the disputed second round of the 2004 presidential election and led to the annulment of the result and the repeat of the round—the leader of the opposition Viktor Yushchenko was declared President, defeating Viktor Yanukovych. The Orange Revolution was supported by PORA.
- 2018 - The Velvet Revolution in Armenia, which began with the nomination of President Serzh Sargsyan for the post of Prime Minister and against the ruling Republican Party of Armenia, achieved a non-violent transition of power to the opposition, which received widespread public support throughout the country. In elections to the National Assembly, held seven months after the resignation of the former leader, the party of the new government won 88% of the vote. However, it is not common to refer to it as a Colour Revolution, nor do its leaders use the term.

== List of nonviolent revolutions by region ==
=== Middle East ===
The media attention given to the color revolutions has inspired movements in the Middle East, and their supporters, to adopt similar symbology.

- The Cedar Revolution in Lebanon followed the assassination of opposition leader Rafik Hariri in 2005. Chiefly, the movement demanded the withdrawal of Syrian troops from Lebanon, ending a de facto occupation. Unlike the revolutions in Eastern Europe and Central Asia, this movement did not seek to overturn disputed election results, but did cause the pro-Syrian government of Lebanon to fall.

=== Latin America ===
Drawing inspiration from the People Power Revolution of 1986 in the Philippines, as well as other succeeding color revolution movements, several South American countries experienced what were effectively non-violent revolutions.

- Dominican Republic – "The Butterflies" or "Las Mariposas". The Mirabal sisters fought to change their government, by underground movements. Also, by rejecting sexual advances from the president himself. Three sisters were ordered to be killed by the president at the time, Rafael Trujillo, and only one survived to tell the story. There is also a movie made about their ordeal.
- Ecuador – The impeachment of President Lucio Gutiérrez, by the Congress of that country after days of increasing demonstrations and protests by citizens led by the citizens of Quito, the capital. Thousands of demonstrators were present in the Plaza of Independence. Flags were waved in celebration shortly after Congress voted out Gutierrez 62–0. Airport runways were blocked by demonstrators to prevent Gutierrez from leaving the country. The former president was later given asylum by Brazil and was transported out of the country on April 24. Protesters also intended to depose the Congress after accusing the body of alleged corruption as well.

=== Asia ===
- South Korea – The June Struggle of 1987. It led to the end of military rule in South Korea and the establishment of democracy.
- Taiwan – The Wild Lily student movement of 1990. Prior to the demonstrations, Taiwan was under one-party rule by the Kuomintang. The student protesters demanded popular elections for the president and members of the National Assembly. Previously, the National Assembly was dominated by representatives from provinces of mainland China who effectively held lifelong terms since the Republic of China could not hold elections in mainland China after the Kuomintang lost the Chinese Civil War. President Lee Teng-hui, who was not a waishengren from mainland China, supported the students' goals and instituted constitutional reforms which effectively transformed Taiwan into a democracy.
- The Philippines – The Second EDSA Revolution of 2001, a four-day popular revolt that peacefully overthrew Philippine president Joseph Estrada in January 2001, self-organized through SMS messaging.

=== Africa ===
- Sudan – The Sudanese Revolution in 2018 was a major shift of political power in Sudan that started with protests throughout the streets on 19 December 2018 and continued with sustained civil disobedience for about eight months, during which the 11 April 2019 Sudanese coup d'état deposed President Omar al-Bashir after thirty years in power and ultimately leading to a "Political Agreement and a Draft Constitutional Declaration" legally transitioning to a civilian democracy.

== See also ==
- Peaceful transition of power
- Nonviolence
- Nonviolent resistance
- Civil resistance
- Satyagraha
- Social defence
- 1908 Venezuelan coup d'état
- 2007 Georgian demonstrations
- 2011 Bahraini uprising
- 2020–2021 Belarusian protests
