= Fraser Canyon War =

Violent incident in British Columbia

- Date: 1858
- Location: Fraser Canyon, British Columbia

Parties
| White miners Colony of British Columbia | Nlaka'pamux |

Lead figures
| Henry Snyder Governor James Douglas | Chief Sexpínlhemx (David Spintlum) |

The Fraser Canyon War, also known as the Canyon War or the Fraser River War, was an incident in 1858 between white miners and the indigenous Nlaka'pamux people in the newly declared Colony of British Columbia, which later became part of Canada. It occurred during the Fraser Canyon Gold Rush, which brought many white settlers to the Fraser Canyon area. Largely ignored by Canadian historians, it was one of the seminal events of the founding of the colony. Although it ended relatively peacefully, it was a major test of the new administration's control over the goldfields, which were distant and difficult to access from the centre of colonial authority at Victoria in the Colony of Vancouver Island (New Westminster had recently been surveyed as the de jure capital, but the de facto capital was in Victoria, where the Governor was located).

== Combatants ==
British troops were not involved, and only arrived on scene once the war was over. The combatants of the war were six hastily assembled regiments of irregulars mustered from the goldfields around Yale, British Columbia and the Nlakaʼpamux people of the Fraser Canyon upstream from there. The militias, or "companies", were formed mostly of Americans but included German and French mercenaries who had served in Nicaragua, as had some of the Americans. The Nlaka'pamux, usually known in English as the Thompson or Hakamaugh (an attempt at pronouncing "Nlaka'pamux"), also were known as the Couteau or "Knife" Indians, partly as a result of this war (their region, the middle Fraser Canyon and Thompson Canyon, also appears on period maps as "the Couteau Country", which may also be a reference to the serrated benchlands lining the rivers' canyons). The name "Kootomin" also appears on very early maps showing routes to the goldfields. Enlisted to the Nlaka'pamux side, but not seeing combat, were allied warriors from the Secwepemc, Nicola, Okanagan and other tribes. The Nlaka'pamux of the lower Canyon, notably the Spuzzum people, as well as the St'at'imc and Sto:lo peoples, remained "friendly Indians".

== Canyon War ==
The war was precipitated when a young Nlaka'pamux woman was raped by a group of American miners, in the area of Kanaka Bar. The Nlaka'pamux retaliated by killing several of them, decapitating the bodies and dumping them into the river; they eventually were found circling in a large eddy near the town of Yale, the main commercial centre of the rush. This alarmed the thousands of miners lining the riverbanks between there and Kanaka Bar. For some time in the months leading up to this incident, tensions had risen due to increasing conflict between indigenous people and the encroaching miners. Conflict broke out amongst the parties when a group of goldseekers sparred with a party of Indians that had previously killed several white men and dumped them into a pool in much the same manner as the incident at Yale. Due to the reputation of the Nlaka'pamux, the riverbanks north of Yale were emptied, as miners in the thousands fled south to the relative safety of Spuzzum and Yale.

The miners held meetings. Most of them had been in the California Gold Rush but they were a diverse lot of men, from all over the world. Of the six regiments hastily organized to respond to the war, one, named the Austrian Company and captained by a John Centras, was composed of French and German irregulars who had served with the William Walker filibustering campaign in Nicaragua in 1853, and relocated to the California goldfields afterwards, following the other Californian miners northwards to Yale when news of the Fraser rush reached San Francisco (many of the Americans in the goldfields had also served in Walker's rebellion). Another regiment, the Whatcom Company, was formed of mostly southerners, under the command of Captain Graham. Bent on a war of extermination, the Whatcom Company's name was taken from that of the Whatcom Trail, which traversed what is now Whatcom County, Washington state from Bellingham Bay on Puget Sound, and which was used in open defiance of the British colonial administration's edict that access to the goldfields be made from Victoria and via steamboat from there only; in other words, their name implicitly indicated their annexationist sentiments.

The largest and most influential company formed in the chaotic situation was the New York Pike Guards, led by a Captain Henry Snyder, who swayed the assembled miners' committees for a war of pacification rather than a war of extermination as was the wish of Captain Graham and others. Snyder proposed a distinction between warlike and friendly Indians and messengers sent up the Canyon ahead of the advancing companies to tell friendly natives to display a white flag as a sign of peace.

The war parties left Yale and progressed to Spuzzum, where the companies found 3000 panicked miners encamped in a small area near the native rancherie, worried for their safety but unable to proceed any further south. Snyder's and Centras' companies crossed to the east side of the river at this point, which was one of the only viable crossings, with Snyder sending Graham's group up the west side of the river.

The New York and Austrian companies met no resistance on the journey north, and sent messages forward to Camchin, the ancient Nlaka'pamux "capital" at the confluence of the Fraser and Thompson Rivers (today's town of Lytton), that they were coming to parley peace, not make war. Meanwhile, Graham and his men rampaged up the west bank of the Canyon, destroying native food caches and potato fields but otherwise encountering only a few natives, most of whom had withdrawn into the deep mountain valleys flanking the canyon as refuge. The Whatcom Company were wiped out in a night-time gun-battle, witnessed by the other companies encamped across the river at the time. This was not due to native attack, but rather to a panicked reaction to a rifle falling over and misfiring, causing a melee from which only two or three men survived, as all the rest died shooting at each other in the dark.

At Camchin, the assembled leaders of the Nlaka'pamux and allies from the Secwepemc (Shuswap) and Okanagan peoples held council. The Nlaka'pamux war leader tried to incite the assembled warriors to wipe out the white men once and for all, but the Camchin chief Sexpínlhemx (known commonly in English as Spintlum, or David Spintlum), had good relations with Governor James Douglas and argued for peaceful co-existence.

Snyder and Centras marched into the midst of the Nlaka'pamux war council undaunted; if they had known about the thousands of warriors watching from the surrounding mountainsides they might not have been so bold. As per native custom, they were given the right to speak, presumably speaking through translators, and told the assembled natives that if the war were to continue, white men by the thousands would come and occupy the country and destroy all the natives forever. In their own notes they presumed it was because they showed the natives their more-modern rifles (most natives, if they had firearms, had only muskets and carbines) and thought that this had persuaded them to make peace. In reality, the decision to make peace had already been reached, in the indigenous account. The notion that it would be impossible to wipe out all white men probably helped persuade any chiefs sitting on the fence to take the side of the peace-maker, Sexpínlhemx.

Six treaties were made that day, known as the Snyder Treaties, none of which has survived either in print or oral form, dealing with the co-existence in the Canyon and the working of the goldfields lining it. Indigenous peoples were the first to mine gold on the Thompson, and remained active miners throughout the rush.

== Aftermath ==
No formal figures of the dead from the Fraser Canyon War exist, and much hyperbole has been made by both sides. Estimates of the white dead range from several dozen to several hundred or even thousands; some say the native casualties were extreme.

Just after the war parties' return to Yale, Governor Douglas and a contingent of Royal Engineers arrived to take control of what was feared to have been a situation that could easily have led to a war not only of extermination, but also of annexation. Douglas had already been mortified that miners' committees had been established and the "California system" of claims had been implemented, without his say-so and outside the bounds of British law. He was even more mortified to discover that Snyder and Centras, without a mandate, had proceeded to make treaties with the natives, which was under British law entirely the jurisdiction of the Crown. He admonished the Americans, but they were conciliatory and swore to abide by the Queen's laws henceforth.

It was during this visit that the stage was set for the impending McGowan's War fiasco, as it was during this visit that the justices for Yale and Hill's Bar (Whannell and Perrier, respectively) were appointed by Douglas, who had no idea of their real characters and the consequences these appointments would all too quickly bring to local politics. Also accompanying the Governor on his steamboat journey to Yale on this occasion was one Ned McGowan, known as "the notorious" or as "the ubiquitous", whose presence would precipitate the subsequent series of improbable events known as McGowan's War later in the winter.

== See also ==
- McGowan's War
- Fraser Canyon Gold Rush
- Yakima War
- Cayuse War
- Okanagan Trail
- Whatcom Trail
