= McGowan's War =

1858 war in Yale, British Columbia

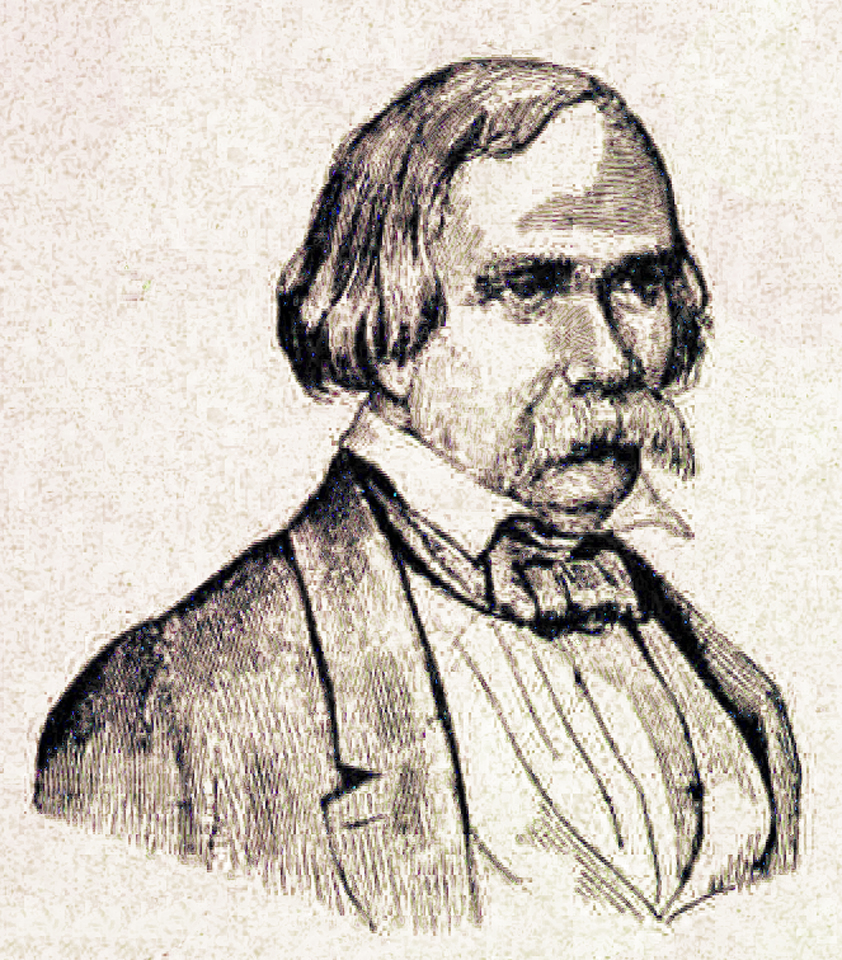
- Edward McGowan
Date	1859
Location	Yale, British Columbia
Result	British Columbian bloodless victory

Belligerents
Colony of British Columbia	(United States) American gold miners

Commanders and leaders
(British Columbia) James Douglas; (British Columbia) Colonel Richard Clement Moody	(United States) Edward McGowan

Casualties and losses
None	None

McGowan's War was a bloodless war that took place in Yale, British Columbia in the fall of 1858. The conflict posed a threat to the newly established British authority on the British Columbia mainland (which had only just been declared a colony the previous summer), at the onset of the Fraser Canyon Gold Rush. It was called Ned McGowan's War after one of the conflict's main antagonists.

Ned McGowan was one of a group of associated miners at Hill's Bar, the richest and first gold-bearing bar of the Fraser Canyon Gold Rush, at which a ramshackle "town" had sprung up, 5 miles below Yale. Hill's Bar was under the control of McGowan's party of former San Franciscan firemen associated with the Law and Order Party, who had flourished from the claim they had named "The Boatmen of San Francisco". Yale, on the other hand, had fallen into the sway of members of the notorious San Francisco Vigilance Committee, which had ruled San Francisco through summary execution of suspected criminals. They were also the arch-enemies of the Law and Order Party – and of Ned McGowan especially.

The tragedy of judicial errors took on great importance to colonial authorities as soon as it was known that Ned McGowan was a part of the conflict between the leaders of the two mining communities. McGowan's reputation in the San Francisco papers had preceded him to British Columbia – so much so that when he first arrived in Victoria he was summoned by Governor James Douglas, who instructed him to conduct himself accordingly in the Queen's domains. It seems that Mr. McGowan, a US miner, had fled California in somewhat of a hurry.

After a career as Philadelphia lawyer and state politician in Pennsylvania, which ended in a scandal from which he was later absolved, McGowan moved to California and became a judge of the Barbary Court, an Associate of the Court of Sessions, and other juridical positions. McGowan and his friends became involved with the Law and Order Party and he ran afoul of the powerful and even more dangerous Vigilance Committee.

== Precursors to conflict on the Lower Fraser River ==
In San Francisco, McGowan had a violent personal quarrel with a member of the Vigilance Committee which precipitated a meeting in the fire hall, the Law and Order group's headquarters, at which they chose to make their sudden departure to the newly found Fraser River gold fields in what was then called New Caledonia. They were among the first San Franciscan parties to reach the river, and their claim at Hill's Bar proved to be one of the richest. However, the great mass movement of men from California to the Fraser brought many members of the Vigilance Committee, including the individual McGowan had had the violent personal conflict with in San Francisco (a Danish doctor and dentist, Dr. Fifer). Just as the Law and Order Party had brought Magistrate Perrier under their sway, Perrier being Governor Douglas' appointee to the bench in Hill's Bar, in Yale the Vigilance Committee did what they could to subvert civil authority and dominate the corrupt local officials who administered the township.

== Racism behind yuletide fracas ==
The incident that provoked the war took place when one of the men from Hill's Bar assaulted Isaac "Ikey" Dixon, Yale's Black American barber, at the Christmas Dance in 1858. Some of the American miners took exception to the fact that the Christmas Dance was open to persons of all races. Dixon was a voluble wag and wit, and in time would become a familiar newspaper columnist in the British Columbia newspapers. Dixon, from Yale, laid a complaint before Yale's Justice of the Peace, Peter Brunton Whannell; and was promptly placed in "protective custody" at Yale. In the meantime, the matter was also being investigated by George Perrier, Justice of the Peace for Hill's Bar. Perrier, with the assistance of Ned McGowan, a friend of the two suspects, was of the opinion that in the interests of a fair hearing he needed to hear evidence from the victim Dixon, before proceeding to deal with the persons who had committed the assault. Perrier accordingly sent his constable, Henry Hickson, with an order to pick up Dixon and bring him back to Hill's Bar.

== Duelling Magistrates ==
Meanwhile, Magistrate Whannell, induced by the men of the Vigilance Committee, issued a warrant for the arrest of the Hill's Bar man and ordered that it be served in Hill's Bar. Magistrate Perrier took exception to this and issued a warrant for the arrest of Isaac Dixon in Yale. Constable Hickson, in serving the warrant on Dixon, interrupted Whannell's court. Whannell promptly arrested and jailed Hickson for contempt of court when he refused to acknowledge Whannell as his superior. The jail at Yale was already full as a result of Whannell's 'law and order' agenda, a condition which prompted British Columbia's first judge, Matthew Begbie to later comment, "the gaol at Yale, which, being circumscribed in its limits, must when thus containing prosecutor, witnesses, and constable—everybody but the accused persons—have been rather inconveniently crowded."

The angry Hill's Bar miners, headed by McGowan, set out with a warrant issued by the Hill's Bar magistrate Perrier to arrest the Yale magistrate Whannell for contempt of court for imprisoning his constable Hickson. The American flag flew on the flotilla sent up from Hill's Bar, causing Whannell to remark that it seemed as if McGowan was going to make a national affair of the matter. McGowan, given the status of special constable by Perrier, threw open the jail and set all the prisoners free and brought magistrate Whannell back to Hill's Bar by boat. The unpopular Whannell was convicted of contempt of court by Perrier, and released after the $50 fine was paid.

== Whannell appeals to the Governor ==
Whannell hastily penned a note to Governor James Douglas, playing on Douglas' fears of the intentions of the Americans: "The town and district are in a state bordering on anarchy. My own and the lives of the citizens are in imminent peril ... An effective blow must at once be struck on the operations of these outlaws, else I tremble for the welfare of the colony." The story, as relayed to Victoria by Vigilance Committee messengers, was that Ned McGowan had launched an attempt to overthrow the British authority in the new colony and declare the gold fields to be part of the United States. Given McGowan's unsavoury reputation, the combative nature of the incident which had the two communities up in arms caused significant alarm in the colonial capital of Victoria.

== Moody's Royal Engineers to the rescue ==
Colonel Richard Clement Moody had arrived in British Columbia in December 1858, in command of the Royal Engineers, Columbia Detachment, to found the British Empire's "bulwark in the farthest west" and "found a second England on the shores of the Pacific". Moody had hoped to begin immediately the foundation of a capital city, but upon his arrival at Fort Langley he learned of the violence at the settlement of Hill's Bar.

Moody describes the incident thus:

The notorious Ned McGowan, of Californian celebrity at the head of a band of Yankee Rowdies defying the law! Every peaceable citizen frightened out of his wits!—Summons & warrants laughed to scorn! A Magistrate seized while on the Bench, & brought to the Rebel’s camp, tried, condemned, & heavily fined! A man shot dead shortly before! Such a tale to welcome me at the close of a day of great enjoyment.

Moody and the Royal Engineers, Columbia Detachment, accompanied by Justice Matthew Baillie Begbie, made the arduous trip to Yale, where Moody and the Engineers prevented violence and Begbie convened court. Another group of Marines remained stationed at Fort Langley to resist any action by the nearby troops of the US Border Commission stationed in nearby Whatcom County. On hearing the tangled web of cases and charges resulting from the misconduct of both justices Perrier and Whannell, McGowan was fined for assault and both magistrates were dismissed from their posts, thus ending the bloodless war, which afterward became well known as Ned McGowan's War.

Moody enjoyed a warm reception for his success that he describes thus:

They gave me a Salute, firing off their loaded Revolvers over my head—Pleasant—Balls whistling over one’s head! as a compliment! Suppose a hand had dropped by accident! I stood up, & raised my cap & thanked them in the Queen’s name for their loyal reception of me.

== See also ==
- Fraser Canyon War
- Fraser Canyon Gold Rush

== Bibliography ==
- McGowan's War, Donald J. Hauka, New Star Books, Vancouver (2000) ISBN
- British Columbia Chronicle,: Gold & colonists, Helen and G.P.V. Akrigg, Discovery Press, Vancouver (1977) ISBN
- Claiming the Land, Dan Marshall, UBC Ph.D Thesis, 2002 (unpubl.)
