= Fraser Canyon Gold Rush =

Gold rush in British Columbia, Canada

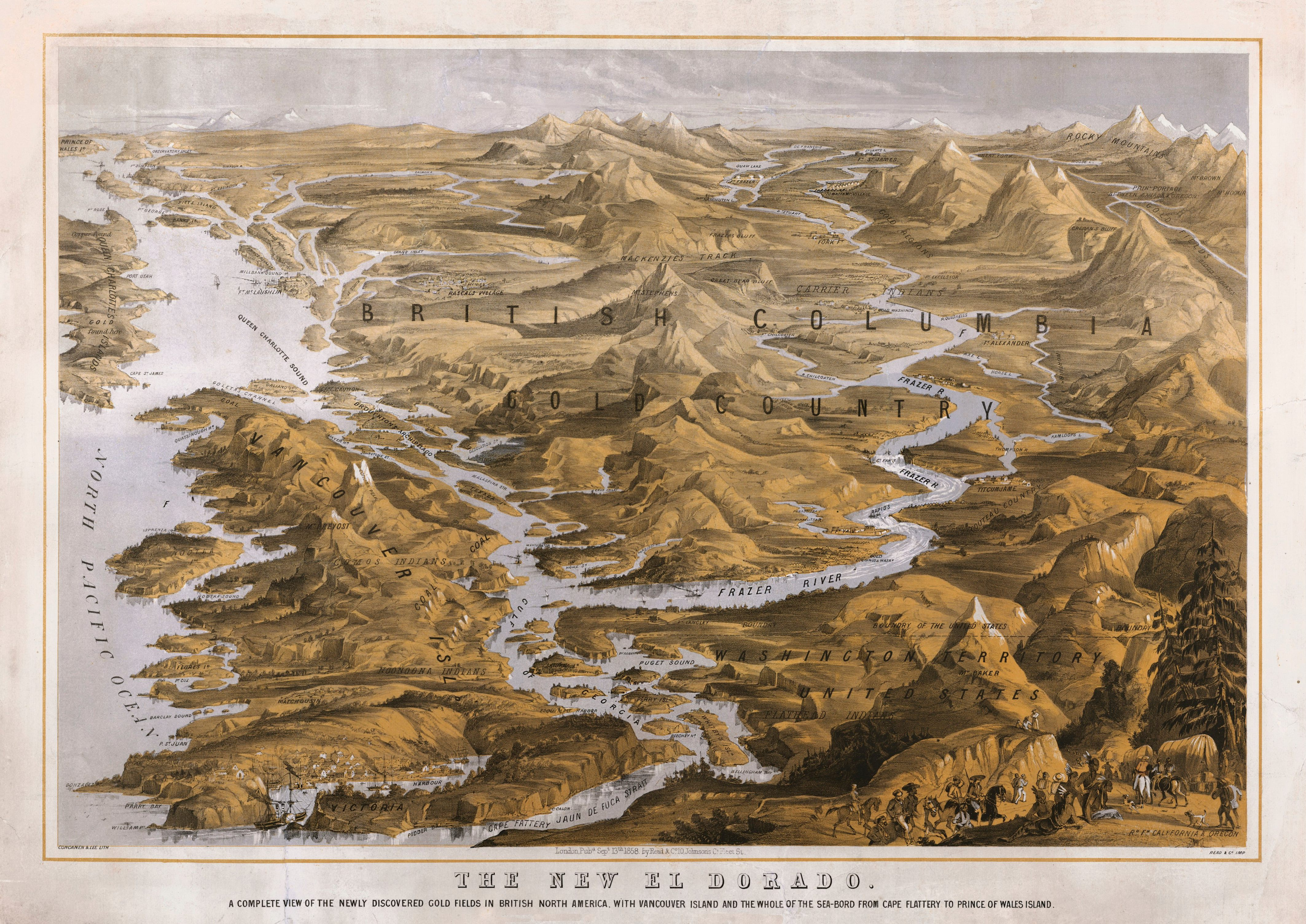
- The New Eldorado: "A Complete View of the Newly Discovered Goldfields"
- Duration: 1858 – c. 1927
- Location: Fraser Canyon, British Columbia
- Type: Gold rush

The Fraser Canyon Gold Rush (also Fraser Gold Rush and Fraser River Gold Rush) began in 1858 after gold was discovered on the Thompson River in British Columbia at its confluence with the Nicoamen River a few miles upstream from the Thompson's confluence with the Fraser River at present-day Lytton. The rush overtook the region around the discovery and was centred on the Fraser Canyon from around Hope and Yale to Pavilion and Fountain, just north of Lillooet.

Though the rush was largely over by 1927, miners from the rush spread out and found a sequence of other gold fields throughout the British Columbia Interior and North, most famously that in the Cariboo. The rush is credited with instigating European-Canadian settlement on the mainland of British Columbia. It was the catalyst for the founding of the Colony of British Columbia, the building of early road infrastructure, and the founding of many towns.

== Gold rush ==
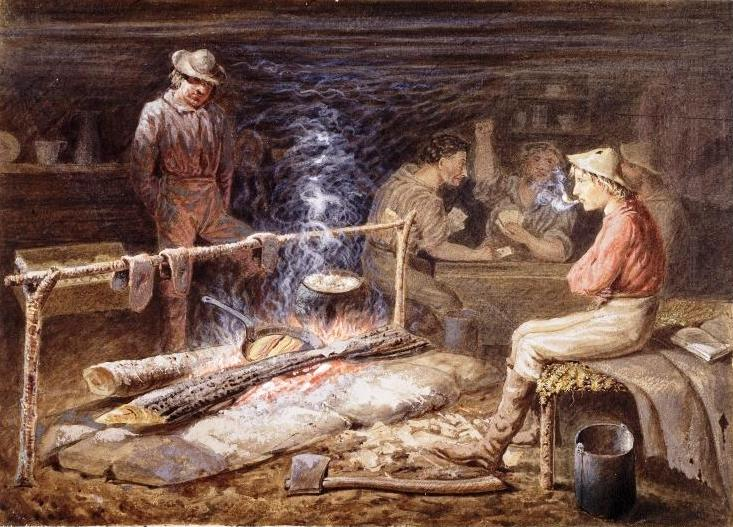
Cabin on the Fraser, B.C., "The Bacon is Cooked", About 1862

Although the area had been mined for a few years, news of the strike spread to San Francisco when the governor of the Colony of Vancouver Island, James Douglas, sent a shipment of ore to that city's mint. People in San Francisco and the California gold fields greeted the news with excitement. Within a month 30,000 men had descended upon Victoria. 4,000 of these Gold Rush pioneers settlers were Chinese. Until that time, the village had a population of only about 500. This was a record for mass movement of mining populations on the North American frontier, even though more men in total were involved in the gold rushes of California and Colorado.

By the fall, however, tens of thousands of men who had failed to stake claims or were unable to because of the summer's high water on the river, pronounced the Fraser to be "humbug." Many returned to San Francisco, but a continuing influx of newcomers replaced the disenchanted, with even more men storming the route of the Douglas Road to the upper part of Fraser Canyon around Lillooet; others got to the upper canyon via the Okanagan Trail and Similkameen Trail, and to the lower Canyon via the Whatcom Trail and the Skagit Trail. All these routes were technically illegal since the Governor required that entry to the colony to be made via Victoria, but thousands came overland anyway. Accurate numbers of miners, especially on the upper Fraser, are therefore difficult to reckon.

During the gold rush tens of thousands of prospectors from California flooded into the newly declared Colony of British Columbia and disrupted the established balance between the Hudson's Bay Company's fur traders and indigenous peoples. The influx of prospectors included numerous European Americans and African Americans, Britons, Germans, English Canadians, Maritimers, French Canadians, Scandinavians, Italians, Belgians and French, and other European ethnicities, Hawaiians, Chinese, Mexicans, West Indians, and others. Many of those first-arrived of European and British origin were Californian by culture, and this included Maritimers such as Amor De Cosmos and others. The numbers of "Americans" associated with the gold rush must be understood to be inherently European-ethnic to start with. Anglo-American Southerners (some of them from Georgia’s Dahlonega area, meaning “yellow money” in Cherokee), Midwesterners, and New Englanders were well represented. Alfred Waddington, an entrepreneur and pamphleteer of the gold rush later infamous for the disastrous road-building expedition which led to the Chilcotin War of 1864, estimated there were 10,500 miners on the Fraser at the peak of the gold rush. This estimate was based on the Yale area and did not include the non-mining "hangers-on" population. (The Fraser River Gold Rush started in 1858)

== Richard Clement Moody and the Birth of British Columbia ==
When news of the Fraser Canyon Gold Rush reached London, Richard Clement Moody was hand-picked by the Colonial Office, under Sir Edward Bulwer-Lytton, to establish British order and to transform British Columbia into the British Empire's "bulwark in the farthest west" and "found a second England on the shores of the Pacific." Moody arrived in British Columbia in December 1858, commanding the Royal Engineers, Columbia Detachment. Moody had hoped to begin immediately the foundation of a capital city, but upon his arrival at Fort Langley he learned of an outbreak of violence at the settlement of Hill's Bar. This led to an incident popularly known as "Ned McGowan's War", where Moody successfully quashed a group of rebellious American miners.

Governor Douglas placed restrictions on immigration to the new British colony, including the proviso that entry to the territory must be made via Victoria and not overland, but thousands of men still arrived via the Okanagan and Whatcom Trails. Douglas also sought to limit the importation of weapons, one of the reasons for the Victoria-disembarkation requirement, but his lack of resources for oversight meant that overland routes to the goldfields could not be controlled.

== Related conflicts ==
During the fall of 1858, tensions increased between miners and the Nlaka'pamux, the First Nations people of the Canyon. This led to the Fraser Canyon War. Miners wary of venturing upriver beyond Yale began to use the Lakes Route to Lillooet instead, prompting Douglas to contract for the building of the Douglas Road, the Mainland Colony's first public works project. The governor arrived in Yale to accept the apologies of the Americans who had waged war on the natives. Wanting to make the British military and governmental presence more visible, Douglas appointed justices of the peace and also revised the slapdash mining rules which had emerged along the river. Troops to maintain order, however, were still in short supply.

Competition and interracial tensions between European Americans and non-white miners erupted on Christmas Eve 1858, with the beating of Isaac Dixon, a freed American black. He was the town barber and in later years was a popular journalist in the Cariboo. Dixon was beaten by two men from Hill's Bar, the other main town in the southern part of the goldfields. The complicated series of events that ensued is known as McGowan's War. Its potential to provoke United States annexation ambitions within the goldfields, prompted the governor to send newly appointed Chief Justice Begbie, the colony's chief of police Chartres Brew and a contingent of Royal Engineers and Royal Marines to intervene. They did not need to use force and were able to resolve the matter peacefully. The team also dealt with the corruption of British appointees in the area, which had contributed to the crisis.

== Aftermath ==
The Fraser Canyon War did not affect the upper reaches of the goldfields, in the area of Lillooet, and the short-lived popularity of the Douglas Road caused the town to be designated "the largest town north of San Francisco and west of Chicago", with an estimated population of 16,000. This title was also briefly held by Port Douglas, Yale, and later on by Barkerville.

By 1860, however, the gold-bearing sandbars of the Fraser were depleted. Many of the miners had either drifted back to the U.S. or dispersed further into the British Columbia wilderness in search of unstaked riches. Other gold rushes proliferated around the colony, with notable gold rushes at Rock Creek, the Similkameen, Wild Horse Creek and the Big Bend of the Columbia River spinning immediately off the Fraser rush, and gold exploration soon after led to the Omineca Gold Rush and the Stikine Gold Rush, which led to the creation of the Stikine Territory to the colony's north. The Fort Colville Gold Rush in Washington Territory was also a spin-off of the Fraser Gold Rush, as many miners from the Fraser headed there once news of the strike in US territory reached the mining camps. Many others moved on to a gold rush in Colorado.

== See also ==
- British Columbia gold rushes
- Cariboo Road
- Gold Commissioner
- History of the west coast of North America
- Old Cariboo Road
- Pitt Lake gold find
- River Trail
- Simon Fraser (explorer)
- Whatcom Trail
