= Cariboo Road =

Historical route in British Columbia, Canada

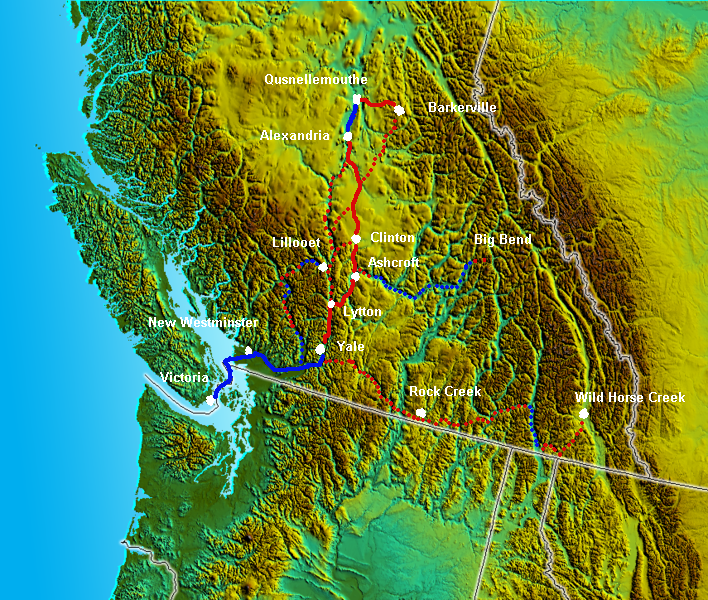
Route of the Cariboo Road in red. Steamboat travel in blue; dotted lines are alternate routes or routes to other goldfields

The Great North Road (or the Queen's Highway) was a project initiated in 1860 by the Governor of the Colony of British Columbia, James Douglas. It was built in response to the Cariboo Gold Rush to facilitate settlement of the area by miners. It involved a feat of engineering stretching from Fort Yale to Barkerville, B.C. through extremely hazardous canyon territory in the Interior of British Columbia. It was a precursor to British Columbia Highway 97, which largely follows the same route.

Between the 1860s and the 1880s the Cariboo Road existed in three versions as a surveyed and constructed wagon-road route. The first established road was Cariboo Wagon Road surveyed in 1861 and built in 1862 followed the original Hudson's Bay Company's Harrison Trail (Port Douglas) route from Lillooet to Clinton, 70 Mile House, 100 Mile House, Lac La Hache, 150 Mile House to the contract end around Soda Creek and Alexandria at the doorstep of the Cariboo Gold Fields. The second Cariboo Wagon Road (or Yale Cariboo Road) operated during the period of the fast stage-coaches and freight-wagon companies headquartered in Yale: 1865 to 1885. From the water landing at Yale, the road ran north via the spectacular Fraser Canyon route over Hell's Gate and Jackass Mountain, connecting to the earlier Cariboo Road at Clinton. The third Cariboo Road was the revised route following the completion of the Canadian Pacific Railway in 1885. The railway station at Ashcroft became the southern end of the wagon road. Much of the Fraser Canyon wagon road was destroyed by the railway construction as well as by washouts and by the Great Flood of 1894 (interest in rebuilding this portion of the road would not occur until the construction plans for the Fraser Canyon Highway for automobiles in the 1920s).

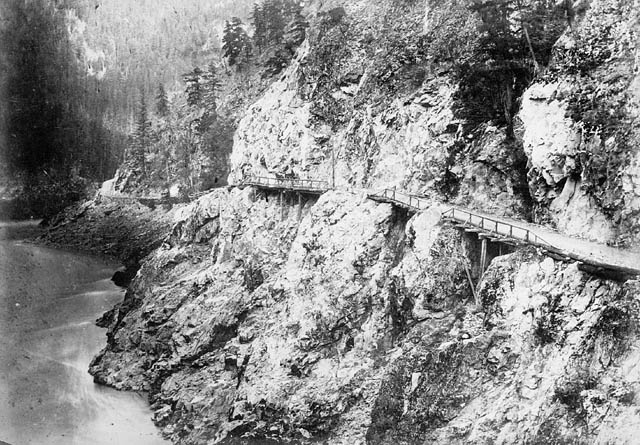
A portion of the Cariboo Road just above Yale, circa 1867–1868

The road was a reaction to the high concentration of gold in the Cariboo region and the dangerous "mule trail", which was a rough-hewn cliff-side trail - wide enough only for one mule - that ran along the approximate route of the Cariboo Road. In order to lower supply-costs to the settlers in the Cariboo region, Douglas ordered the construction of a more viable and safe form of transportation to the gold-mining settlements. The colonial government employed locals as well as the Royal Engineers, Columbia Detachment ("sappers") who undertook amazing engineering feats, including the construction of toll bridges including the (original) Alexandra Suspension Bridge of 1863.

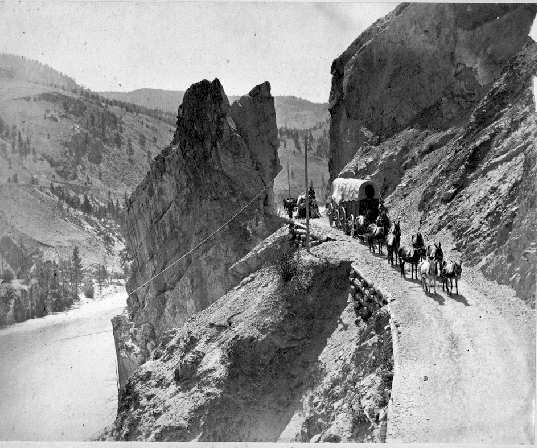
Cariboo Road along the Thompson River at the Great Bluff, 1867

Building the road cost nearly one and a quarter million dollars, and left a standing debt of £112,780 after its completion, one of many infrastructure costs in servicing the Gold Colony that forced its amalgamation first with Vancouver Island (1866), and then with Canada (1871 confederation). The Cariboo Road saw the transportation of over six and a half million dollars' worth of gold. Originally Douglas wanted to stretch the road across the continental divide into Rupert's Land (modern day Alberta) but this plan was abandoned when Douglas retired in 1864.

== The "Old" Cariboo Road ==
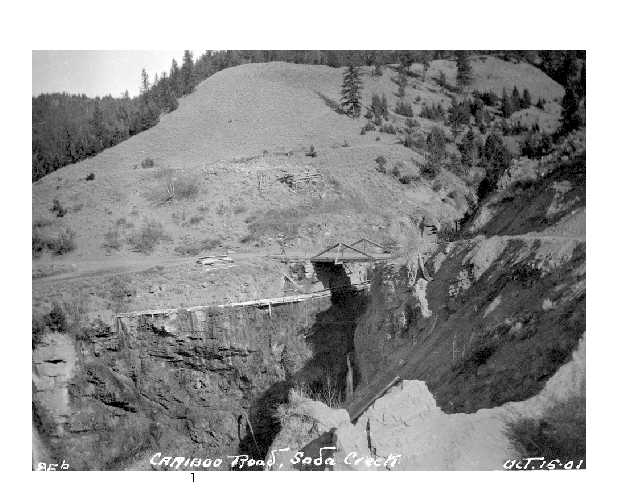
The Cariboo Road at Soda Creek. The style of truss-bridge shown is typical of Royal Engineer design.

The name Cariboo Road or Cariboo Trail is also informally applied to a toll road built by contractor Gustavus Blin-Wright in 1861–1862 from Lillooet to Williams Lake, Van Winkle and on to Williams Creek (Richfield, Barkerville). This route was known also as the Old Cariboo Road, when the Lakes Route from Port Douglas to Lillooet had not yet been superseded by the Fraser Canyon route of the Cariboo Wagon Road proper. The mile-house names (e.g. 100 Mile House), in the Cariboo are derived from measurements taken from the Mile '0' of this road, which is in the bend in the Main Street of Lillooet and commemorated there by a cairn erected in the 1958 Centennial Year. It was along this route that an attempt was made to use Bactrian camels purchased from the U.S. Camel Corps for freight (1862), and also a tractor-style Thomson Road Steamer known as a "road train", one of the earliest motorized vehicles.

Most foot traffic from Lillooet to the Cariboo however, went by the "River Trail", far below the wagon road, which departed the Fraser Canyon at Pavilion for the steep climb over Pavilion Mountain to Clinton, where it merged with the newer Cariboo Road via Yale and Ashcroft (once the latter route was completed, that is). The River Trail continued along the Fraser Canyon as far as Big Bar and various routes spread towards Quesnel and Barkerville from there.

== Television ==
The Cariboo Road was featured on the television historical series Gold Trails and Ghost Towns, season 2, episode 4.

== See also ==
- Fraser Canyon Gold Rush
- Whatcom Trail
- Okanagan Trail
- Dewdney Trail
- Lillooet Cattle Trail (Lillooet Road, North Vancouver)
- Cariboo Highway
- Old Cariboo Highway
