= Douglas First Nation =

The Douglas First Nation, aka the Douglas Indian Band, Douglas Band, or Xaʼxtsa First Nation, are a band government of the In-SHUCK-ch Nation, a subgroup of the larger St'at'imc people, also referred to as Lower Stl'atl'imx. The Douglas, Skatin and Samahquam communities are related through familial ties as well as culturally and linguistically. The In-SHUCK-ch are the southernmost of the four divisions making up the Lillooet ethnographic group. The Douglas First Nation's main community is at Xa'xtsa, a village on their main reserve at the head of Harrison Lake, near the former gold rush port-town of Port Douglas.

== British Columbia Treaty Process ==
Please see In-SHUCK-ch Nation#British Columbia Treaty Process.

== Demographics ==
The number of registered band members as of September 2009 was 235. Of these 51 were living on one of the band's own reserves (30 male, 21 female), 39 were living on reserves under the administration of another band (26 male, 13 female), and 145 were living off-reserve (57 male, 88 female).

== Indian Reserves ==
Indian Reserves under the administration of the Douglas First Nation are:

- Douglas Indian Reserve No. 8, at the head of Harrison Lake and at the mouth of the Lillooet River, 416.80 ha. 49°45′00″N 122°10′00″W
- Lelachen Indian Reserve No. 6, on both banks of the Lillooet River, 15.20 ha. (s)lápus is the name in Ucwalmícwts for the fishing camp and Transformer site located at/near the bridge crossing in this reserve. 49°47′14″N 122°13′24″W
- Tipella Indian Reserve No. 7, on the right bank of the Lillooet River, 0.30 ha. 49°47′00″N 122°13′00″W
