= Yale, British Columbia =

Town in British Columbia, Canada

Yale
- Unincorporated community
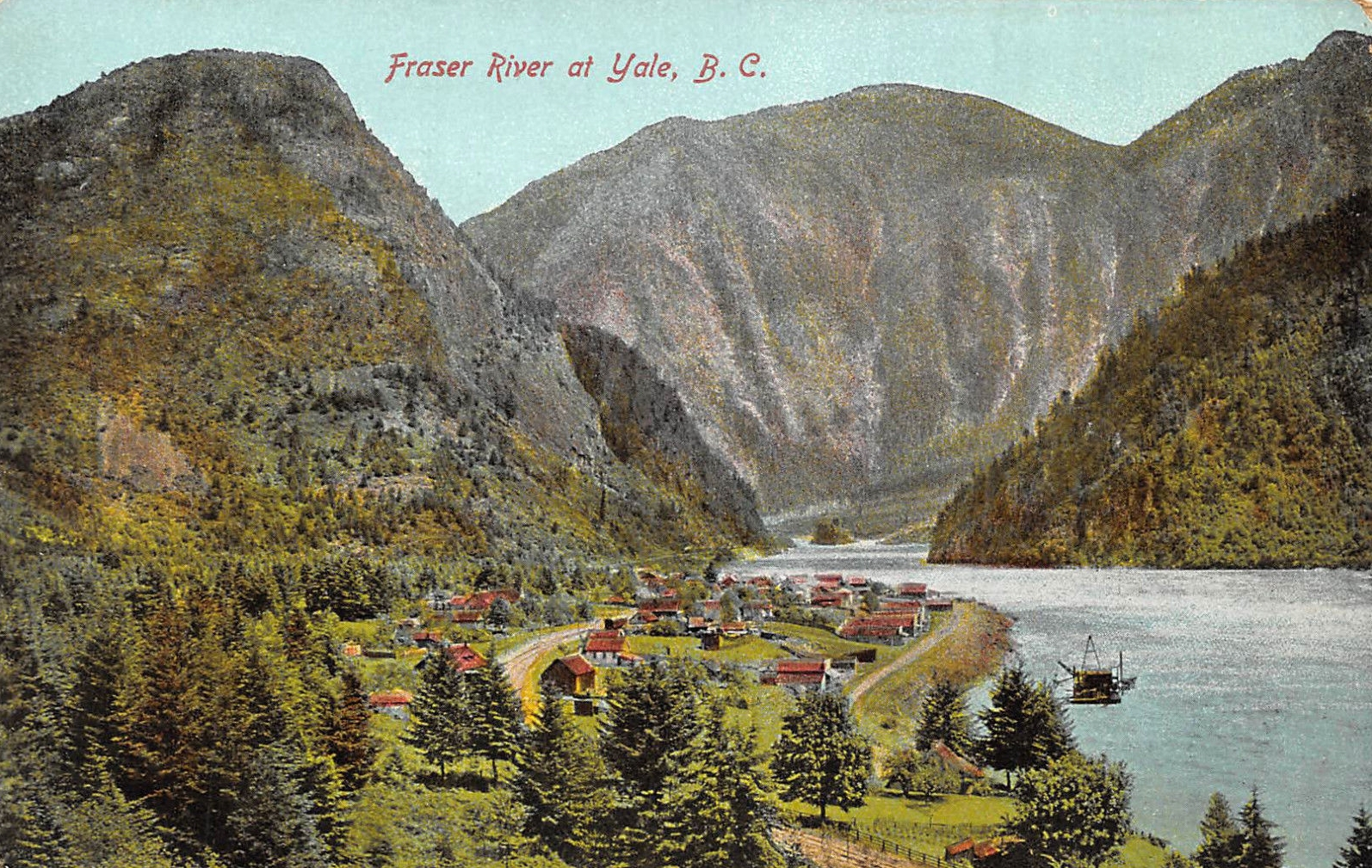
- Postcard- Yale, BC, c.1910

- Location within British Columbia Location within Canada
- Coordinates: 49°34′N 121°26′W
- Country: Canada
- Province: British Columbia
- Region: Fraser Canyon
- Regional District: Fraser Valley Regional District
- Post office founded: N/A

Area (2021)
  - Land: 3.38 km^{2} (1.31 sq mi)

Population (2021)
  - Total: 162
  - Density: 47.9/km^{2} (124/sq mi)
- Time zone: UTC−07:00 (PT)

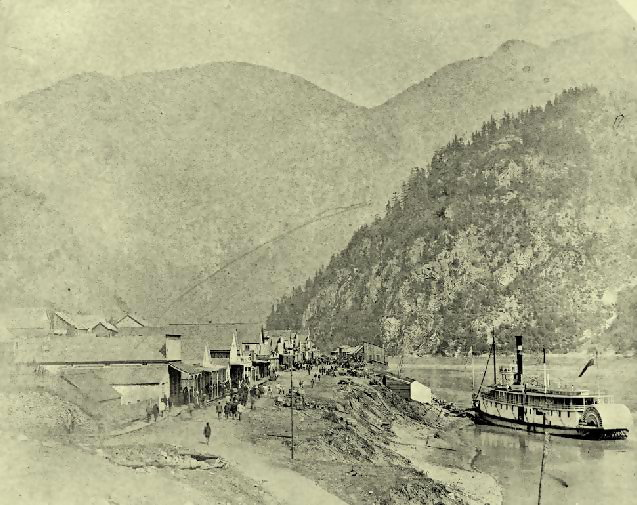
Front Street, Yale, British Columbia circa 1882 during the construction of the Canadian Pacific Railway.

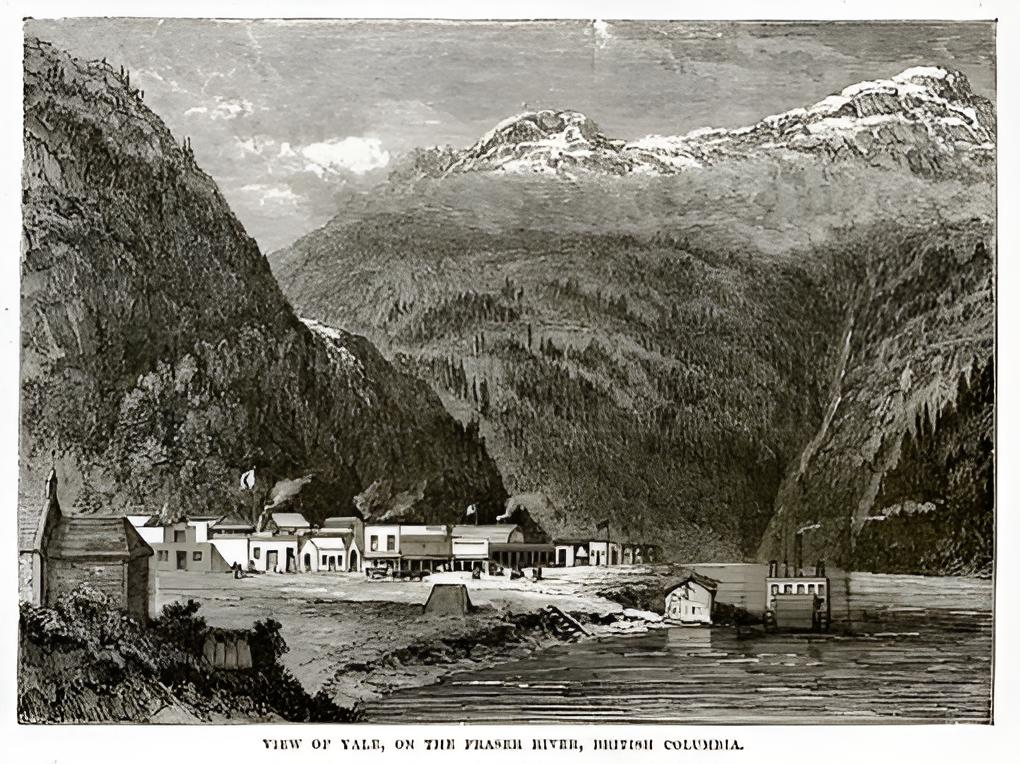
View of Yale, on the Fraser River, British Columbia

Yale is an unincorporated town in the Canadian province of British Columbia, which grew in importance during the Fraser Canyon Gold Rush.

Located on the Fraser River, it is generally considered to be on the dividing line between the British Columbia Coast and the Interior regions of the British Columbia Mainland. Immediately north of the town, the Fraser Canyon begins and the river is generally considered unnavigable past this point. Rough water is common on the Fraser anywhere upstream from Chilliwack and even more so above Hope, about 32 km (20 mi) south of Yale. However, steamers could make it to Yale, good pilots and water conditions permitting, and the town had a busy dockside life as well as a variety of bars, restaurants, hotels, saloons and various services. Its maximum population during the gold rush era was in the 15,000 range. More generally, it housed 5,000-8,000. The higher figure was counted at the time of evacuation of the Canyon during the Fraser Canyon War of 1858.

Most of today's population are members of the self-governing Yale First Nation. Non-native businesses have included a couple of stores, restaurants and a few motels and other services, as well as a gas station, and automotive repair and rescue outfits. The town's only gas station closed in 2021 or 2022 and their general store closed in December 2023. However, a Canco gas station and convenience store opened in 2024. The Yale area is the lowest main destination for the Fraser River rafting expedition companies; several have waterfront campgrounds and facilities near town. All Hallows is now a campground and hostel. Not much of gold rush-era Yale survives, as the docks vanished long ago. The railway was built in the 1880s down the main street of what had been the waterfront town. The Yale Museum is located on old Front Street, adjacent to the tracks. Next to it is the Anglican Church of St. John the Divine, among the oldest in British Columbia.

The town has its own natural landscape. Every summer, a historical reenactment group visits Yale to celebrate the Royal Engineers, who had served under Richard Clement Moody during McGowan's War. They also worked on the Cariboo Wagon Road (later improved as the Trans-Canada Highway) and the Douglas-Lillooet Trail. The men were an integral part of Yale's life from the gold rush to the end of the 1870s.

== History ==
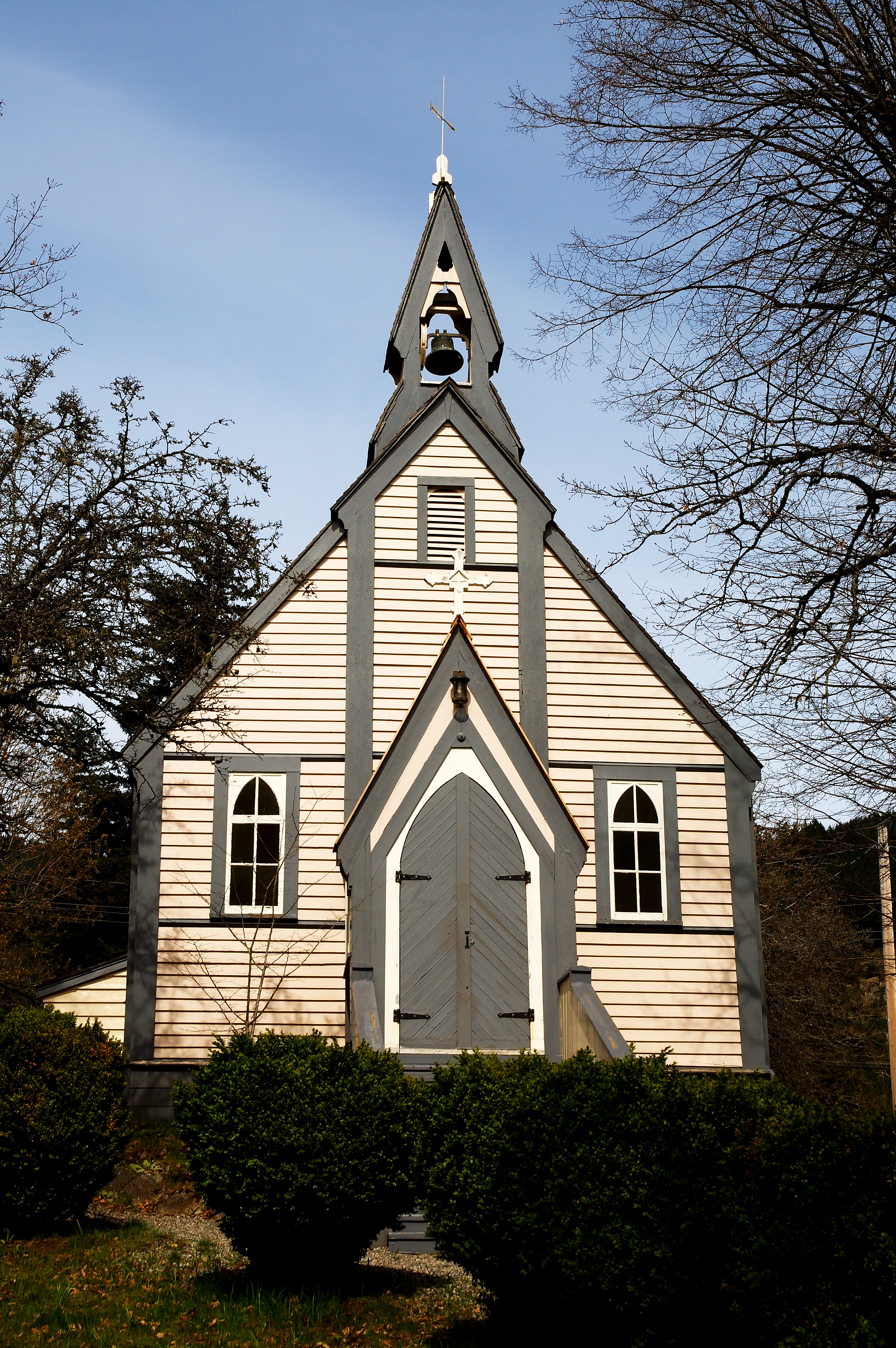
Historic Yale church

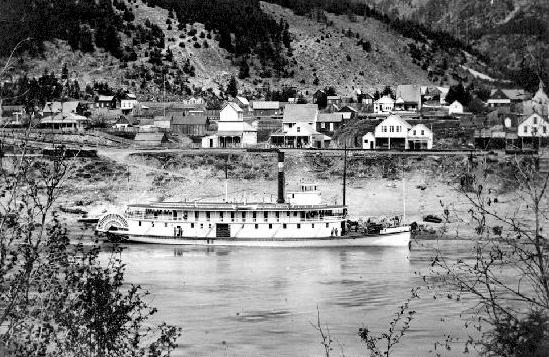
Steamship at Yale on Fraser River, 1882

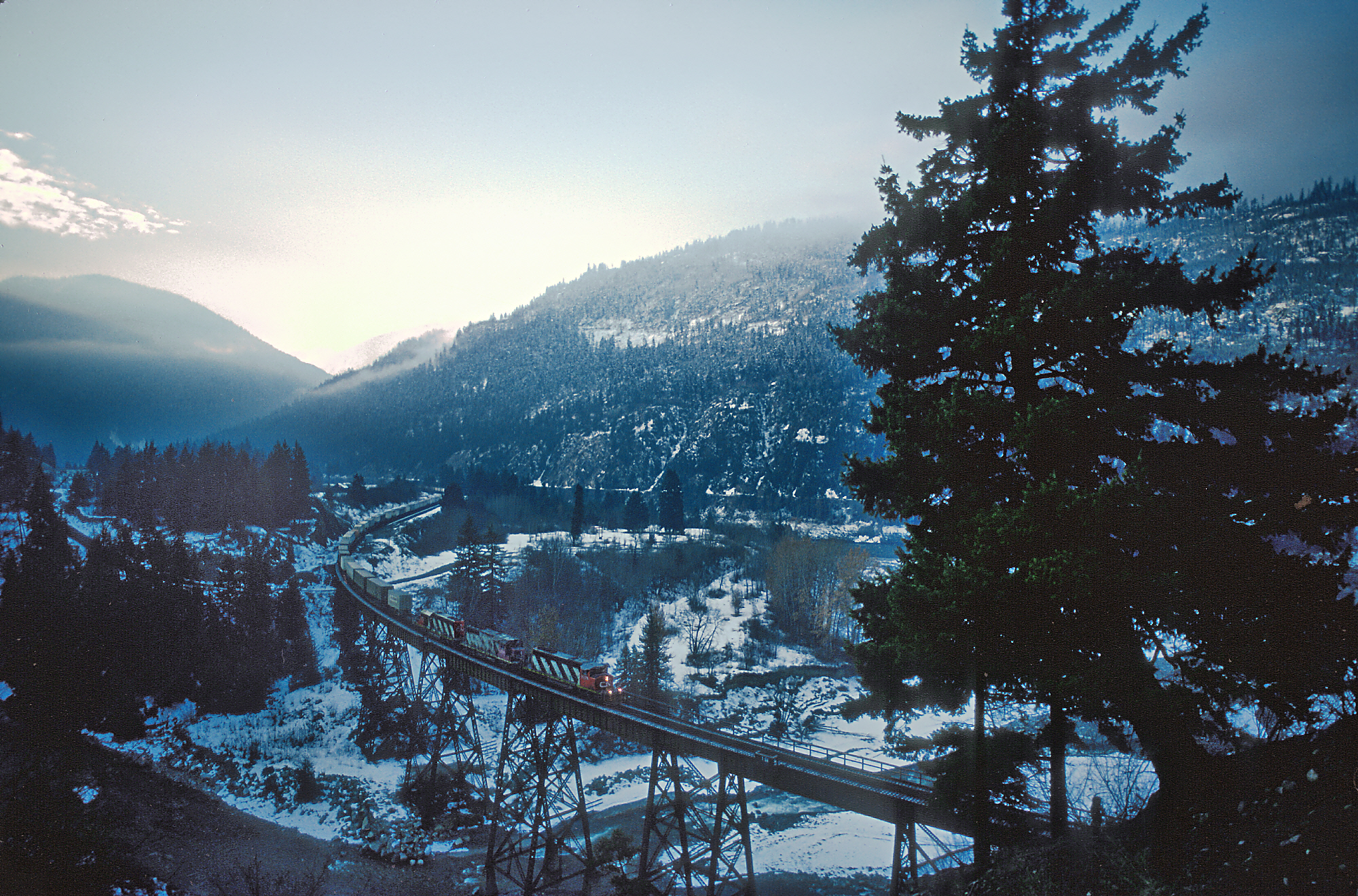
Anderson River bridge between Hicks and Boston Bar on the CN Yale Subdivision, 1984

The town was founded in 1848 by the Hudson's Bay Company as Fort Yale by Ovid Allard, the appointed manager of the new post, who named it after his superior, James Murray Yale, then Chief Factor of the Columbia District. In its heyday at the peak of the Fraser Canyon Gold Rush, it was reputed to be the largest city west of Chicago and north of San Francisco. It also earned epithets such as "the wickedest little settlement in British Columbia" and "a veritable Sodom and Gomorrah" of vice, violence and lawlessness.

Yale played an important role in certain events of the gold rush period which threatened British control in the region with annexation by the United States: the Fraser Canyon War and McGowan's War. The Governor came to Yale during the first crisis, and government officials Matthew Baillie Begbie, Chartres Brew and Richard Clement Moody during the second, to address American miners and take control of matters. The unrest threatened the rule of the Crown over the Mainland (or "New Caledonia" as it was called before the creation of the mainland colony. (New Caledonia was usually applied to the fur district northwest from present-day Prince George).

As Yale was the head of river navigation, it was the best location to be designated for the start of the Cariboo Wagon Road, as there were no usable roads between Yale and the settlements nearer the Fraser's mouth. The Cariboo Road, built in the early 1860s, ran from Yale to Barkerville via Lytton, Ashcroft and Quesnel.

By the start of the 1870s, an overland route from New Westminster was finally built – the Yale Road along the south side of the river. It was formerly known as the Grand Trunk Road and in the 21st century as Old Yale Road; it survives in sections from Surrey through Abbotsford and Chilliwack (though no longer entirely a continuous "highway"). Its counterpart on the north side of the river was the Dewdney Trunk Road, built in the same period in advance of railway construction in the 1880s. That road ran only to Dewdney, just east of Mission City.

Because of its unique role as a transshipment point for the Cariboo Road, Yale prospered for another twenty years after the gold rush. Although it declined in population, it retained some prestige and such sophistication as had grown up within the rough gold town. It was as familiar to early provincial high society as were New Westminster and distant Barkerville. During the construction of the Canadian Pacific Railway, construction ran directly through the village, built on flatland by the river. It destroyed the town's old commercial core and the connection of the town life to the waterfront.

As Yale was handy for travel to and from New Westminster and Gastown (soon after named Vancouver) on Burrard Inlet, it became the headquarters and residence of the American railway contractor Andrew Onderdonk, who supervised its construction. The town boomed with population and new businesses because of railway spending and employment. Yale and nearby Emory City, in the vicinity of Hill's Bar, where the gold rush had begun, as well as all the major Fraser Canyon towns to Ashcroft, thronged with temporary residents and business of various kinds and legitimacy.

Three-times daily rail service to Vancouver – begun in the early 1880s before construction in the Canyon was finished in 1885 – made Yale a popular excursion run. With construction ended, however, the population dropped dramatically in Yale by 1890, and continued to decline afterwards. Daily return service remained in effect until World War I. When Onderdonk moved on in 1886, he donated his estate for a girls' school, All Hallows. This was ranked as one of the main society schools in the colony and continued to operate for decades, into the 1920s.

Construction of the railway destroyed parts of the Cariboo Wagon Road, which was severed between Yale and Boston Bar and between Lytton and Spences Bridge. A new highway north from Yale was not built until the Cariboo Highway in 1922, partly built using surviving roadgrades of the original waggon road and since upgraded to the Trans-Canada Highway. For a long time, this was the main route between the Interior Plateau and the Lower Mainland. After major reconstruction of the Cariboo Highway in the 1950s, involving the construction of several major tunnels, the difficult old canyon stretch of the route achieved highway quality (instead of in name only), and towns such as Yale boomed once again. With the opening of the faster Coquihalla Highway in the 1980s, Yale's economy and population fell off as traffic bypassed it.

== Demographics ==
In 1891, the subdistrict of Yale had a population of 382.

In the 2021 Canadian census conducted by Statistics Canada, Yale had a population of 162 living in 86 of its 118 total private dwellings, a change of 13.3% from its 2016 population of 143. With a land area of 3.38 km^{2} (1.31 sq mi), it had a population density of 47.9/km^{2} (124.1/sq mi) in 2021.

The average age of Yale residents is 56.8 giving a median age of 62.4. This is older than British Columbia as a whole with an average age of 43.1 and a median of 42.8. The predominant language is English with no French listed in the 2021 census. However, 15 people reported Indo-European languages as their mother tongue (5 women Ukrainian, 5 speakers German, 5 Low German, 5 Italic language).

== Television ==
Yale has been featured on the historical television series Gold Trails and Ghost Towns, season 1, episode 7.

== See also ==
- Douglas Road
- Dewdney Trail
- Okanagan Trail
- Jacko hoax
- Yaletown
