= Whatcom Trail =

American overland trail

Coordinates: 48°43′49″N 122°18′31″W

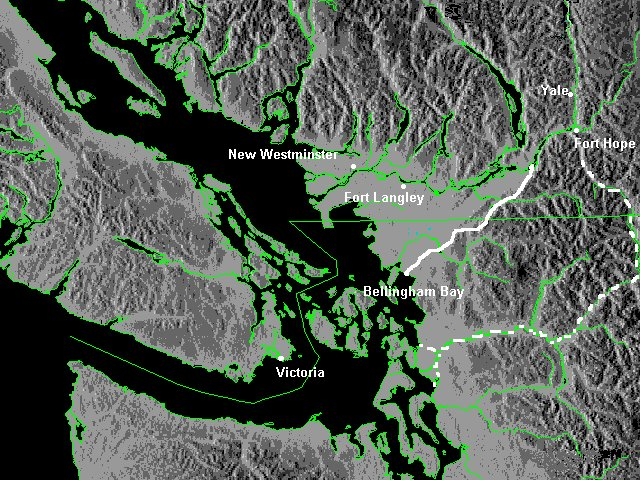
Solid line is Whatcom Trail, dotted line is Skagit Trail Only settlements extant in 1858 are shown

The Whatcom Trail was an overland trail from the Puget Sound area of Washington Territory during the Fraser Canyon Gold Rush of 1858. The trail began on Bellingham Bay, at Fairhaven (now a Bellingham neighbourhood), the route used went via a route known as the Columbia Valley, which is a lowland route connecting the mid-Nooksack River area with Cultus Lake and the lower Chilliwack River in the Upper Fraser Valley, about 80 km east of today's Vancouver. In 1858, T. G. Richards built the first brick building in Washington as an outfitter for those using the Whatcom Trail.

The name "Whatcom" comes from the Lummi place name x̣ʷátqʷəm, probably meaning "noisy" with reference to a waterfall.

A more westerly route now in use for a major border crossing (at Sumas) was not usable due to the presence of Sumas Lake, a large shallow lake, now drained and turned into agricultural land. An alternate route to the main Whatcom Trail was the Skagit Trail, which went up the river of that name to its headwaters, from which another "back valley" emerges on the Fraser near Hope, then the HBC fur trading post Fort Hope.

There are no known statistics for the number of goldseekers who travelled the Whatcom Trail during the gold rush, although certainly they may be counted in the thousands. Its existence was in open defiance of the edict from the British Governor on Vancouver Island that access to the Fraser goldfields must be made from Victoria, and then from there via the Fraser River only. In part this measure was intended to prevent the entry of large parties of armed Americans, and also to strip them of any handguns and any goods for trading with the Indians (still a Hudson's Bay Company monopoly during the gold rush).

The route's ongoing use was demonstration of the early colony's essential inability to prevent unregulated intrusion by US citizens, as was also the case with the Okanagan Trail. US troops of the Border Commission who were stationed near the route's southern US end were put on alert during the McGowan's War crisis, and were also stationed there during the San Juan Islands Dispute (the Pig War).

Similarly, on the Canadian side, the large tract of land in Sardis that for many years was Canadian Forces Base Chilliwack was laid aside as a military reserve during the scare over potential Fenian Raids in the 1870s and 1880s. That allocation, however, was as much a response to local Stó:lō First Nations numbers as it was to potential American aggression.

There is no border crossing at the Columbia Valley today, only a fence across farmland.

== See also ==
- Okanagan Trail
- Fraser Canyon Gold Rush
