= River Trail (British Columbia) =

Historic trail in British Columbia, Canada

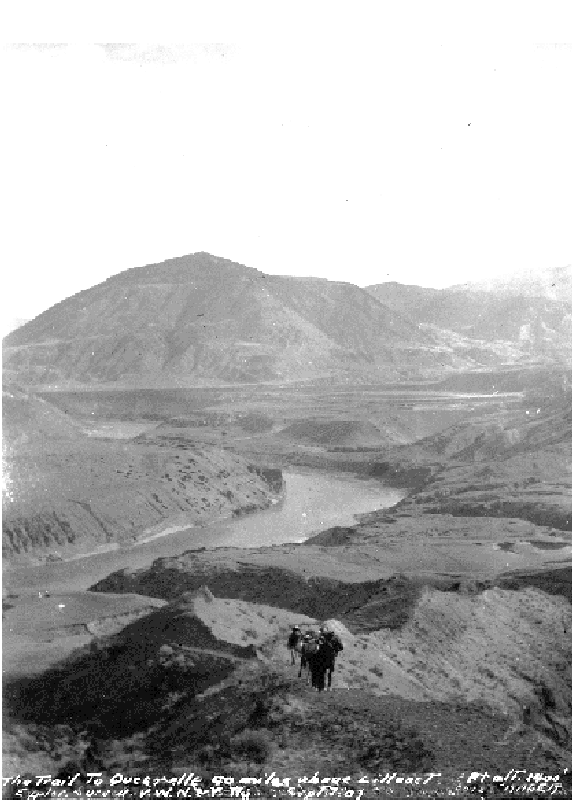
The River Trail at 40 Mile (i.e. North of Lillooet); area of French Bar Creek (1901 picture)

The River Trail was a main route for travel in the colonial era of what is now the Canadian province of British Columbia, running northwards along the Fraser River from to present day Lillooet to Big Bar, British Columbia and points beyond in the Cariboo District. The route was primarily in use during the Fraser Canyon Gold Rush and associated explorations by prospectors northwards in the search for gold in the Cariboo and Omineca Districts.

Less celebrated than its wagon-road contemporaries, the Old Cariboo Road and later on the Cariboo Road proper, the River Trail (also known as the "Mule Trail") was the choice for most prospectors and travellers heading north from Lillooet who could either not afford the tolls of the Old Cariboo Road, or had no need of it as the River Trail sufficed for foot-travel or horse travel with small packtrains. The wagon roads were built for freight wagons and stage travel, and also went up and over mountains and plateaus which travel via the River Trail did not require. Water was in short supply on this route, which is semi-desert for most of its length as far north as what is now Williams Lake, and the route was very rugged, but was favoured due to its lower elevation and more temperate climate than the official and more-documented routes eastward over the plateaus. One visitor to Fountain, then Upper Fountains, a staging ground for wagon trains 10 miles (16 km) upstream from Lillooet, commented that there were few travellers on the wagon road itself, but that a steady line of men and some horses could be seen threading the difficult valley trail in the canyon-bottom below, "like a line of ants".

== See also ==
- Old Cariboo Road
- Douglas Road
- Fraser Canyon Gold Rush
- Cariboo Gold Rush
- Hudson's Bay Brigade Trail
