= Mišković =

- Language: Serbian, Croatian

Mišković (Serbian Cyrillic: Mишкoвић) is a Serbian and Croatian surname, derived from the male given name Miško (in Serbo-Croatian, it is derived from the word Mišić, which means "small mouse"). It is borne by ethnic Serbs and Croats (Imotica and Pag). A common transliteration of the name is Miscovich.

Notable people with the name include:

- Dejan Mišković (footballer) (born 1985), Croatian footballer
- Dejan Mišković (basketball) (born 1974), Serbian former basketball player
- Miroslav Mišković (born 1945), Serbian businessman
- Milorad Mišković (1928–2013), Serbian choreographer
- Nenad Mišković (born 1975), Bosnian Serb footballer
- Nikola Mišković, (born 1999), Serbian basketball player
- Slobodan Mišković (1944–1997), Yugoslav handball player
- Snežana Mišković (born 1958), known as Viktorija, Serbian female rock singer
- Peter Miscovich (1885–1950), Croatian-American inventor
- John Miscovich (1918–2014), Croatian-American inventor

== See also ==
- Mišović
- Mirković
