= Gold rush =

Gold discovery triggering an onrush of miners seeking fortune

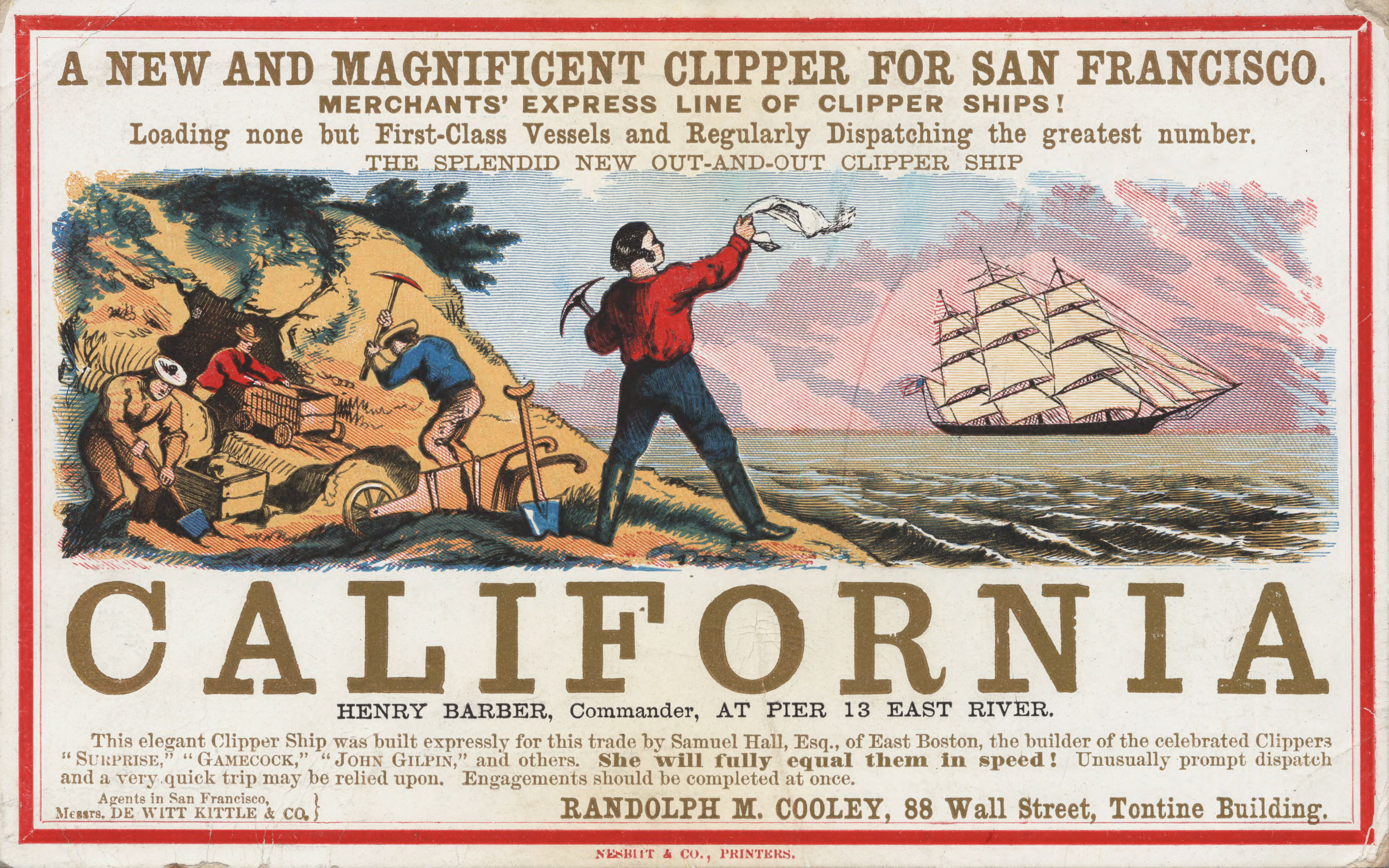
The fastest clipper ships cut the travel time from New York to San Francisco from seven months to four months in the 1849 California Gold Rush.

A gold rush or gold fever is a discovery of gold—sometimes accompanied by other precious metals and rare-earth minerals—that brings an onrush of miners seeking their fortune. Major gold rushes took place in the 19th century in Australia, Greece, Venezuela, New Zealand, Brazil, Chile, South Africa, the United States, and Canada while smaller gold rushes took place elsewhere.

In the 19th century, the wealth that resulted was distributed widely because of reduced migration costs and low barriers to entry. While gold mining itself proved unprofitable for most diggers and mine owners, some people amassed fortunes, and merchants and transportation facilities made large profits. The resulting increase in the world's gold supply stimulated global trade and investment. Historians have written extensively about the mass migration, trade, colonization, and environmental history associated with gold rushes.

Gold rushes were typically marked by a general buoyant feeling of a "free-for-all" in income mobility, in which any single individual might become abundantly wealthy almost instantly, as expressed in the California Dream.

Gold rushes helped spur waves of immigration that often led to the permanent settlement of new regions. Activities propelled by gold rushes define significant aspects of the culture of the Australian and North American frontiers. At a time when the world's money supply was based on gold, the newly-mined gold provided economic stimulus far beyond the goldfields, feeding into local and wider economic booms.

The Gold Rush was a topic that inspired many TV shows and books considering it was a very important topic at the time. During various gold rushes, many books were published including The Call of the Wild, which had much success during the period.

Gold rushes occurred as early as the times of ancient Greece, whose gold mining was described by Diodorus Siculus and Pliny the Elder.

== Surviving the gold rush ==
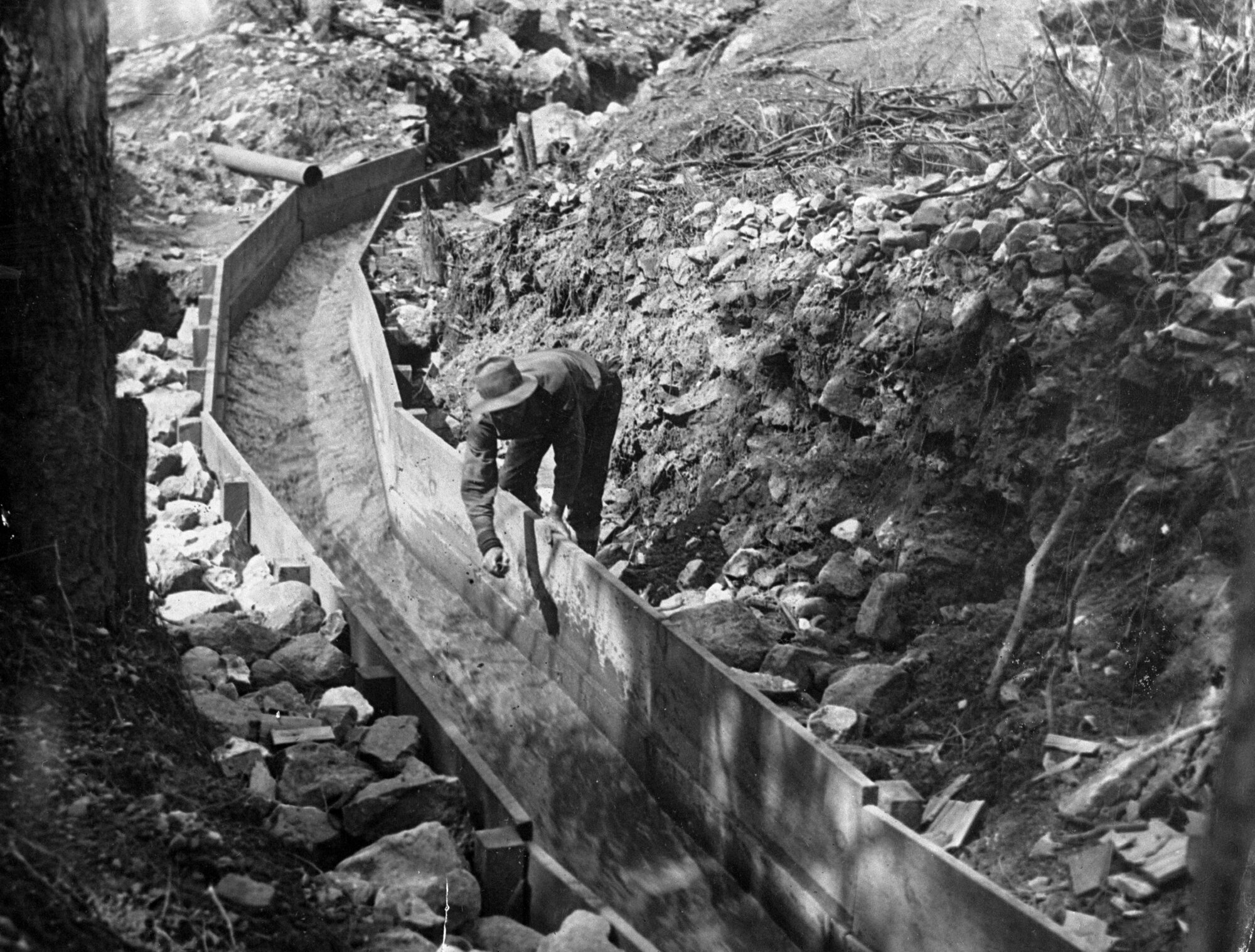
A man leans over a wooden sluice. Rocks line the outside of the wood boards that create the sluice.

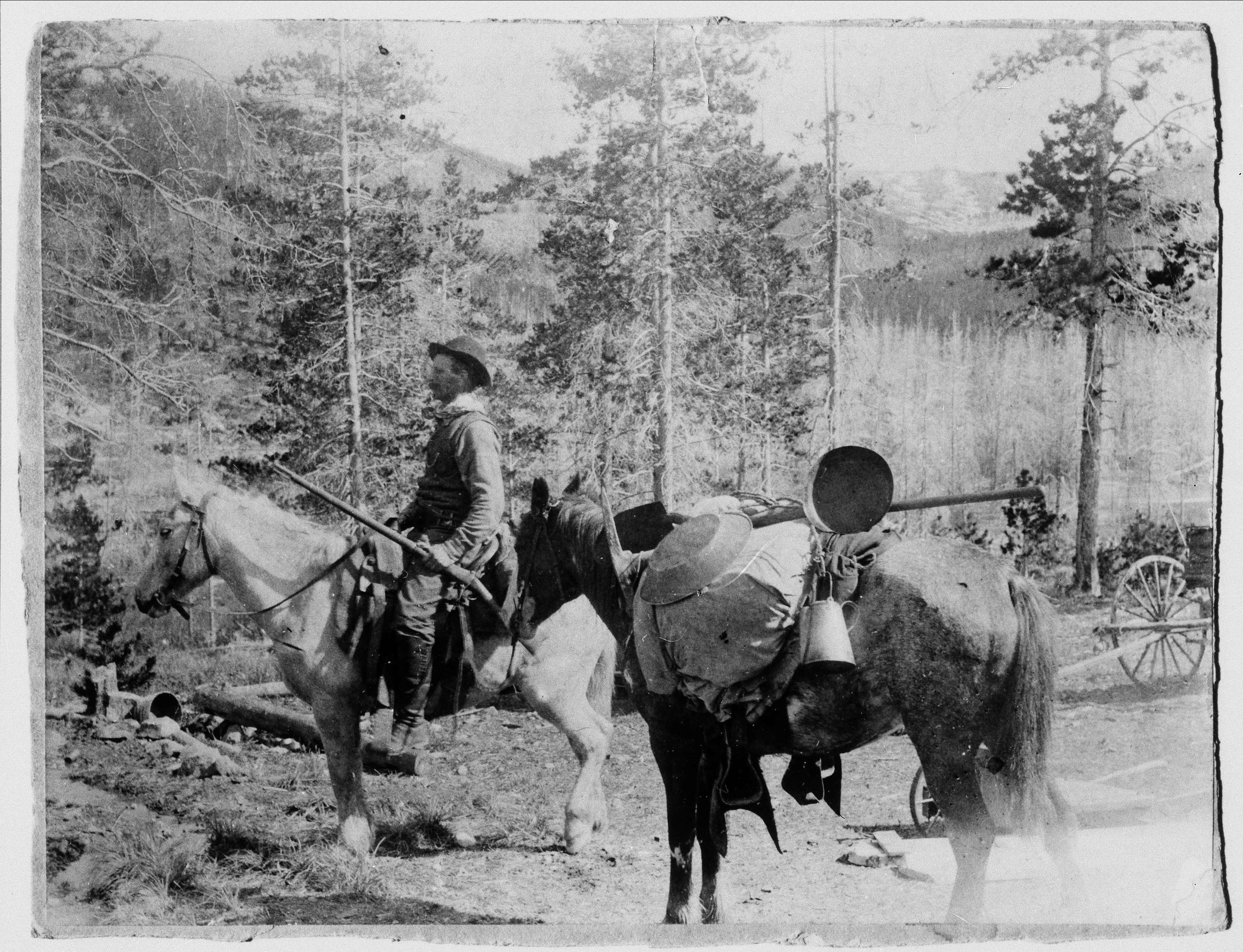
Swedish gold panners by the Blackfoot River, Montana in the 1860s

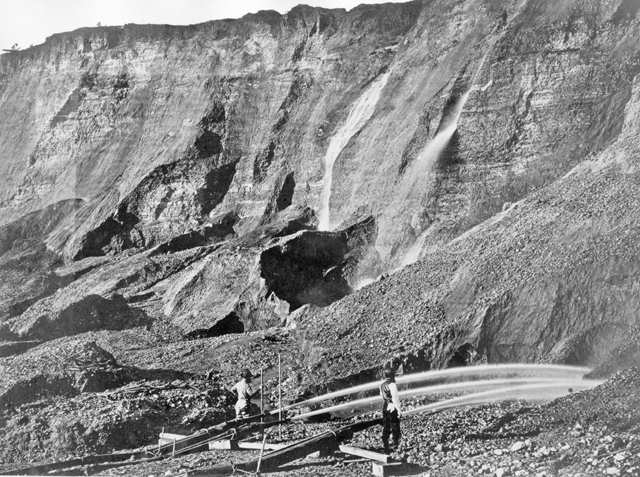
Jets of water at a placer mine in Dutch Flat, California sometime between 1857 and 1870

Within each mining rush there is typically a transition through progressively higher capital expenditures, larger organizations, and more specialized knowledge.

A rush typically begins with the discovery of placer gold made by an individual. First, the area that is being mined is marked with 4 stones, on each corner to prevent anyone from "stealing" the spot. Then, the gold may be washed from the sand and gravel by individual miners with little training, using a gold pan or similar simple instrument. Once it is clear that the volume of gold-bearing sediment is larger than a few cubic metres, the placer miners will build rockers or sluice boxes, with which a small group can wash gold from the sediment many times faster than using gold pans. Winning the gold in this manner requires almost no capital investment, only a simple pan or equipment that may be built on the spot, and only simple organisation. The low investment, the high value per unit weight of gold, and the ability of gold dust and gold nuggets to serve as a medium of exchange, allow placer gold rushes to occur even in remote locations.

After the sluice-box stage, placer mining may become increasingly large scale, requiring larger organisations and higher capital expenditures. Small claims owned and mined by individuals may need to be merged into larger tracts. Difficult-to-reach placer deposits may be mined by tunnels. Water may be diverted by dams and canals to placer mine active river beds or to deliver water needed to wash dry placers. The more advanced techniques of ground sluicing, hydraulic mining and dredging may be used.

Typically the heyday of a placer gold rush would last only a few years. The free gold supply in stream beds would become depleted somewhat quickly, and the initial phase would be followed by prospecting for veins of lode gold that were the original source of the placer gold. Hard rock mining, like placer mining, may evolve from low capital investment and simple technology to progressively higher capital and technology. The surface outcrop of a gold-bearing vein may be oxidized, so that the gold occurs as native gold, and the ore needs only to be crushed and washed (free milling ore). The first miners may at first build a simple arrastra to crush their ore; later, they may build stamp mills to crush ore at greater speed. As the miners venture downwards, they may find that the deeper part of vein contains gold locked in sulfide or telluride minerals, which will require smelting. If the ore is still sufficiently rich, it may be worth shipping to a distant smelter (direct shipping ore). Lower-grade ore may require on-site treatment to either recover the gold or to produce a concentrate sufficiently rich for transport to the smelter. As the district turns to lower-grade ore, the mining may change from underground mining to large open-pit mining.

Many silver rushes followed upon gold rushes. As transportation and infrastructure improve, the focus may change progressively from gold to silver to base metals. In this way, Leadville, Colorado started as a placer gold discovery, achieved fame as a silver-mining district, then relied on lead and zinc in its later days. Butte, Montana began mining placer gold, then became a silver-mining district, then became for a time the world's largest copper producer.

== By region ==
=== Australia and New Zealand ===
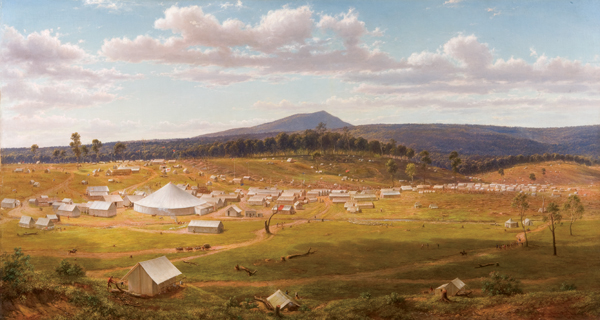
Ballarat's tent city in the summer of 1853–54, oil painting from an original sketch by Eugene von Guerard

Various gold rushes occurred in Australia over the second half of the 19th century. The most significant of these, although not the only ones, were the New South Wales gold rush and Victorian gold rush in 1851, and the Western Australian gold rushes of the 1890s. They were highly significant to their respective colonies' political and economic development as they brought many immigrants, and promoted massive government spending on infrastructure to support the new arrivals who came looking for gold. While some found their fortune, those who did not often remained in the colonies and took advantage of extremely liberal land laws to take up farming.

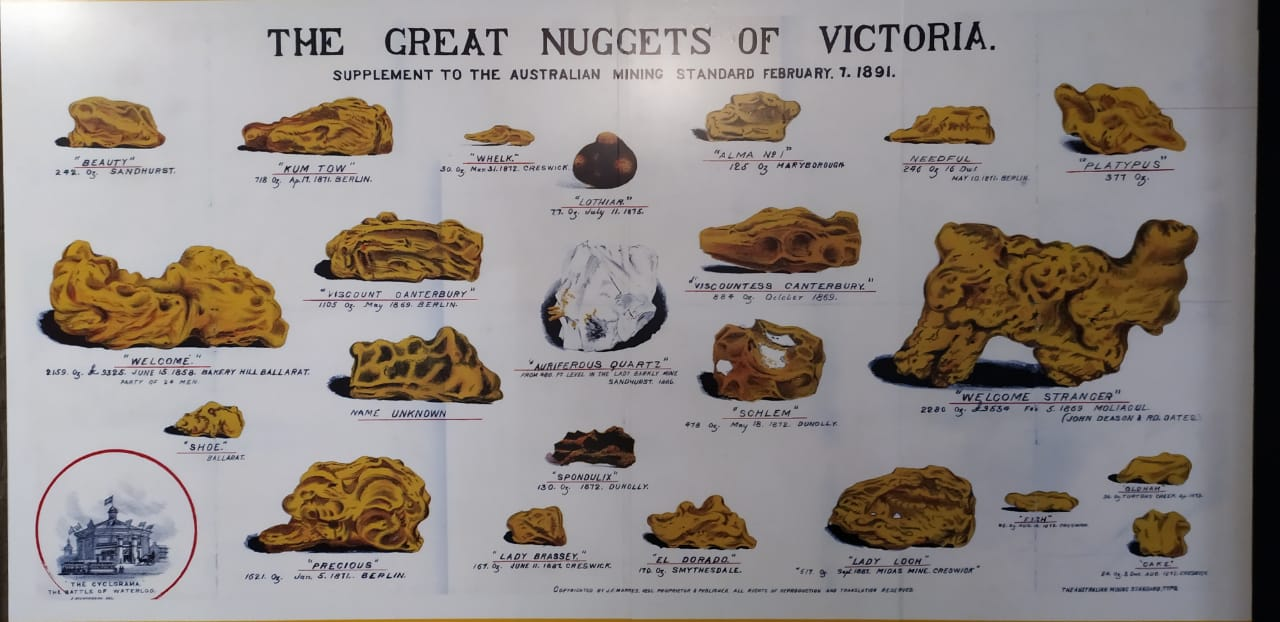
A chart showing the great nuggets of Victoria at Museums Victoria

Gold rushes happened at or around:

- Ballarat, Victoria
- Bathurst, New South Wales
- Beechworth, Victoria
- Bendigo, Victoria
- Canoona, Queensland
- Charters Towers, Queensland
- Coolgardie, Western Australia
- Gympie, Queensland
- Gulgong, New South Wales
- Halls Creek, Western Australia
- Hill End, New South Wales
- Kalgoorlie, Western Australia
- Queenstown, Tasmania

In New Zealand the Otago gold rush from 1861 attracted prospectors from the California gold rush and the Victorian gold rush and many moved on to the West Coast gold rush from 1864.

=== Finland ===
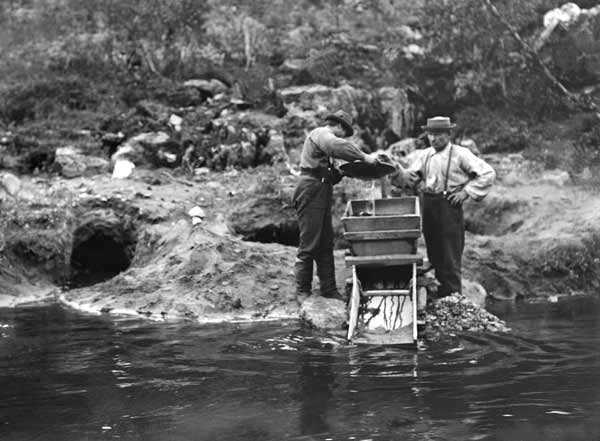
Gold prospecting at the Ivalo River in 1898

The first references of gold in the Finnish Lapland date back to the early 16th century, when gold was discovered from Utsjoki, but its presence not widely known until the 19th century. The actual gold rush started in the valley of the Ivalo River in 1870 and lasted for a few years. Although the scale of the gold rush is not comparable to the major 19th century gold rushes, the Lapland gold rush has great local significance in Lapland and across Finland; during the spring and the summer in 1870, about 500 gold prospectors, who traveled hundreds of kilometers by ski, foot, or boat to the gold prospecting area, made their way through Lapland to the Ivalo River.

To regulate the rush, the government of Grand Duchy of Finland, then part of Imperial Russia, established a headquarters for the authorities and service point for the prospectors, called the "Kultala Crown Station." In Kultala (lit. 'town of gold'), the officials issued licenses for prospectors and purchased their gold, and there were also law enforcement officers and cartographers, as well as a restaurant and post office. At its largest, the number of government officials and gold prospectors was approximately 600 people. This was a significant community, as Lapland was mostly uninhabited wilderness, and the largest populated places contained only up to few hundred people.

Another famous gold prospecting sites were the Lemmenjoki River in the Inari municipality and the Tankavaara village (founded in 1934) in the Sodankylä municipality.

=== North America ===
The first significant gold rush in the United States was in Cabarrus County, North Carolina (east of Charlotte), in 1799 at today's Reed's Gold Mine. Thirty years later, in 1829, the Georgia Gold Rush in the southern Appalachians occurred. It was followed by the California Gold Rush of 1848–55 in the Sierra Nevada, which captured the popular imagination. The California Gold Rush led to an influx of gold miners and newfound gold wealth, which led to California's rapid industrialization, as businesses sprung up to serve the increased population and financial and political institutions to handle the increased wealth. One of these political institutions was statehood; the need for new laws in a sparsely-governed land led to the state's rapid entry into the Union in 1850.

The gold rush in 1849 also stimulated worldwide interest in prospecting for gold, leading to further rushes in Australia, South Africa, Wales and Scotland. Successive gold rushes occurred in western North America: Fraser Canyon, the Cariboo district and other parts of British Columbia, in Nevada, in the Rocky Mountains in Colorado, Idaho, Montana, eastern Oregon, and western New Mexico Territory and along the lower Colorado River. There was a gold rush in Nova Scotia (1861–1876) which produced nearly 210,000 ounces of gold. Resurrection Creek, near Hope, Alaska was the site of Alaska's first gold rush in the mid–1890s. Other notable Alaska Gold Rushes were Nome, Fairbanks, and the Fortymile River.

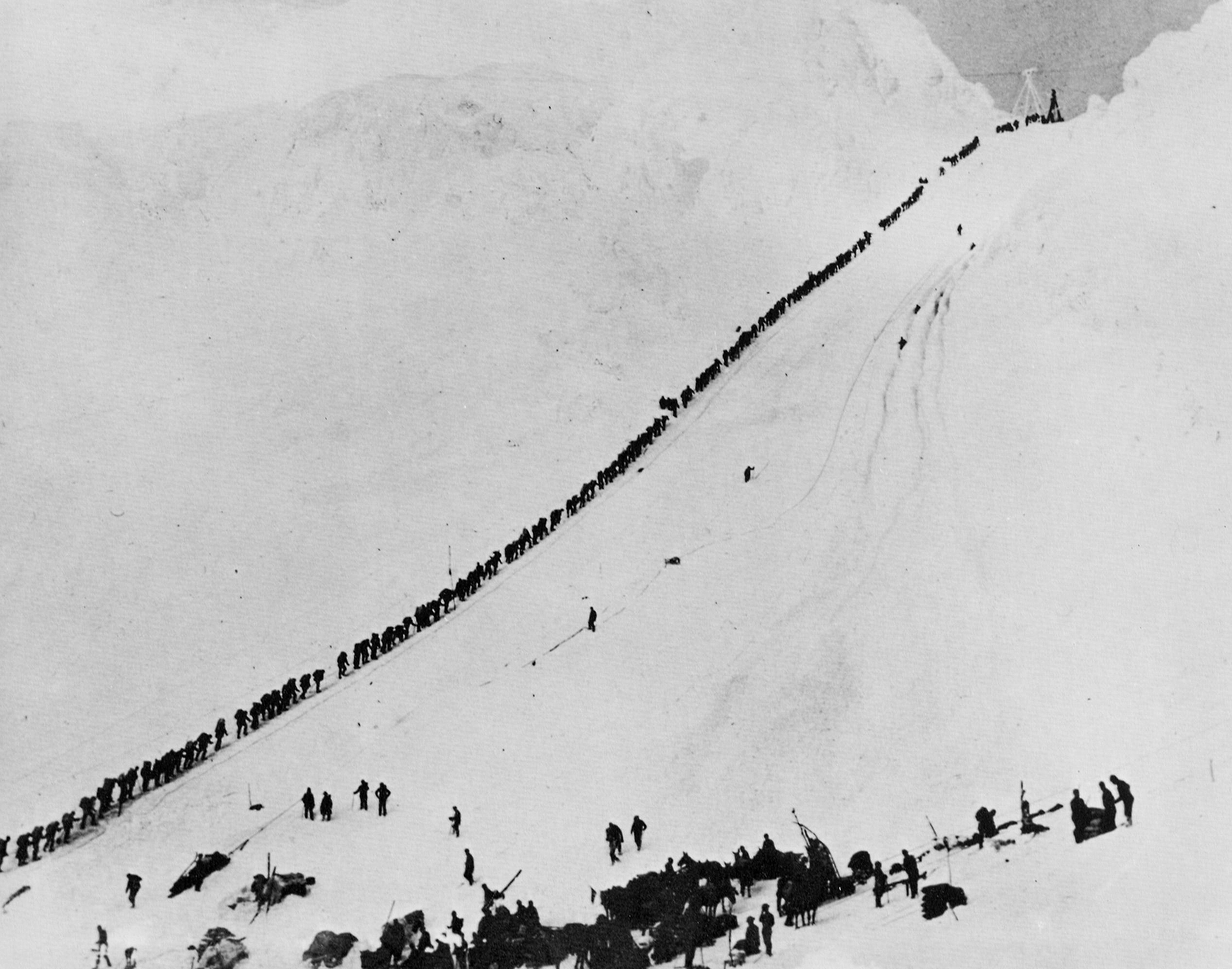
Miners and prospectors ascend the Chilkoot Trail during the Klondike Gold Rush.

One of the last "great gold rushes" was the Klondike Gold Rush in the Yukon Territory (1896–99). This gold rush is featured in the novels of Jack London, and Charlie Chaplin's film The Gold Rush. Robert William Service depicted in his poetries the Gold Rush, especially in the book The Trail of '98. The main goldfield was along the south flank of the Klondike River near its confluence with the Yukon River near what was to become Dawson City in Yukon Territory, but it also helped open up the relatively new US possession of Alaska to exploration and settlement, and promoted the discovery of other gold finds.

The most successful of the North American gold rushes was the Porcupine Gold Rush in Timmins, Ontario area. This gold rush was unique compared to others by the method of extraction of the gold. Placer mining techniques were not able to be used to access the gold in the area due to it being embedded into the Canadian Shield, so larger mining operations involving significantly more expensive equipment was required. While this gold rush peaked in the 1940s and 1950s, it is still active today with over 200 million ounces of gold having been produced from the region. The gold deposits in this area are identified as one of the largest in the world.

=== Africa ===
In South Africa, the Witwatersrand Gold Rush in the Transvaal was important to that country's history, leading to the founding of Johannesburg and tensions between the Boers and British settlers as well as the Chinese miners.

South African gold production went from zero in 1886 to 23% of the total world output in 1896. At the time of the South African rush, gold production benefited from the newly discovered techniques by Scottish chemists, the MacArthur-Forrest process, of using potassium cyanide to extract gold from low-grade ore.

=== South America and the Caribbean ===
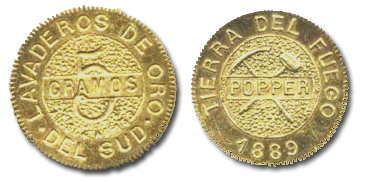
5-gram gold coin from Tierra del Fuego issued by Julius Popper

With the arrival of Nicolás de Ovando's settlement expedition in 1502, the construction of the first colonial society in the Hispaniola island began, focused on the search for and exploitation of gold of Cibao valley. The influx of immigrants was massive until 1510, when the island's gold production reached its peak. The mining industry rested on the forced work of the Taíno indigenous, who quickly became extinct. With the decline of the Taíno labor force and the depletion of deposits, gold production also declined, surpassing that of Puerto Rico and Cuba by the second decade of the century.

The gold mine at El Callao (Venezuela), started in 1871, was for a time one of the richest in the world, and the goldfields as a whole saw over a million ounces exported between 1860 and 1883. The gold mining was dominated by immigrants from the British Isles and the British West Indies, giving an appearance of almost creating an English colony on Venezuelan territory.

Between 1883 and 1906 Tierra del Fuego experienced a gold rush attracting many Chileans, Argentines and Europeans to the archipelago. The gold rush began in 1884 following discovery of gold during the rescue of the French steamship Arctique near Cape Virgenes.

== Mining industry today ==
There are about 10 to 30 million small-scale miners around the world, according to Communities and Small-Scale Mining (CASM). Approximately 100 million people are directly or indirectly dependent on small-scale mining. For example, there are 800,000 to 1.5 million artisanal miners in Democratic Republic of Congo, 350,000 to 650,000 in Sierra Leone, and 150,000 to 250,000 in Ghana, with millions more across Africa.

In an exclusive report, Reuters accounted the smuggling of billions of dollars' worth of gold out of Africa through the United Arab Emirates in the Middle East, which further acts as a gateway to the markets in the United States, Europe and more. The news agency evaluated the worth and magnitude of illegal gold trade occurring in African nations like Ghana, Tanzania, and Zambia, by comparing the total gold imports recorded into the UAE with the exports affirmed by the African states. According to Africa's industrial mining firms, they have not exported any amount of gold to the UAE – confirming that the imports come from other, illegal sources. As per customs data, the UAE imported gold worth $15.1 billion from Africa in 2016, with a total weight of 446 tons, in variable degrees of purity. Much of the exports were not recorded in the African states, which means a huge volume of gold imports were carried out with no taxes paid to the states producing it.

== By date ==
=== Before 1860 ===
- El Cibao valley at Hispaniola island (1494)
- Zacatecas Gold Rush, Viceroyalty of New Spain (1546)
- Brazilian Gold Rush, Minas Gerais (1695)
- El Oro Gold Rush, El Oro de Hidalgo (1787)
- Carolina Gold Rush, Cabarrus County, North Carolina, US (1799)
- Georgia Gold Rush, Georgia, US (1828)
- California Gold Rush (1848–55)
  - Lena Gold Mining Partnership
- Queen Charlottes Gold Rush, British Columbia, Canada (1850); the first of many British Columbia gold rushes
- Northern Nevada Gold Rush (1850–1934)
- Victorian gold rush, Victoria, Australia (1851–late 1860s). Known as the Golden Triangle, it incorporated areas such as Ararat, Castlemaine, Marybororgh, Clunes, Bendigo, Ballarat, Daylesford, Beechworth, and Eldorado.
- Kern River Gold Rush, California (1853–58)
- Idaho Gold Rush, near Colville, Washington (1855; also known as the Fort Colville Gold Rush)
- Gila Placers Rush, New Mexico Territory (present-day Arizona; 1858–59)
- Fraser Canyon Gold Rush, British Columbia (1858–61)
- Rock Creek Gold Rush, British Columbia (1859–60s)
- Pike's Peak Gold Rush, Pikes Peak, Kansas Territory (present-day Colorado; 1859)

=== 1860s ===
- Holcomb Valley Gold Rush, California (1860–61)
- Clearwater Gold Rush, Idaho (1860)
- Otago gold rush, New Zealand (1861)
- Eldorado Canyon Rush, New Mexico Territory (present-day Nevada; 1861)
- Colorado River Gold Rush, Arizona Territory (1862–64)
- Boise Basin Gold Rush, Idaho (1862)
- Cariboo Gold Rush, British Columbia (1862–65)
- Montana Gold Rush (1862–69), including:
  - Bannack, Virginia City (Alder Gulch), and Helena (Last Chance Gulch) (1862–64)
  - Confederate Gulch (1864–69)
- Stikine Gold Rush, British Columbia (1863)
- Owyhee Gold Rush, Southeastern Oregon, Southwestern Idaho (1863)
- Owens Valley Rush, Owens Valley, California (1863–64)
- Leechtown Gold Rush, (south of Sooke Lake), Leech River, Vancouver Island (1864–65)
- West Coast gold rush, South Island, New Zealand (1864–67)
- Big Bend Gold Rush, British Columbia (1865–66)
- Francistown Gold Rush, British Protectorate of Bechuanaland (1867)
- Omineca Gold Rush, British Columbia (1869)
- Wild Horse Creek Gold Rush, British Columbia (1860s)
- Eastern Oregon Gold Rush (1860s–70s)
- Kildonan Gold Rush, Sutherland, Scotland (1869)

=== 1870s ===
- Lapland gold rush, Finland, 1870
- El Callao Gold Rush, Venezuela, 1871
- Cassiar Gold Rush, British Columbia, 1871
- Palmer River Gold Rush, Palmer River, Queensland, Australia (1872)
- Pilgrim's Rest, South Africa (1873)
- Black Hills Gold Rush, Black Hills of South Dakota and Wyoming (1874–78)
- Bodie Gold Rush, Bodie, California (1876)
- Kumara Gold Rush, Kumara and Dillmanstown, New Zealand (1876)
- Millwood, South Africa (1876)

=== 1880s ===
- Barberton Gold Rush, South Africa (1883)
- Witwatersrand Gold Rush, Transvaal, South Africa (1886); discovery of the largest deposit of gold in the world. The resulting influx of miners became one of the triggers of the Second Boer War of 1899–1902.
- Cayoosh Gold Rush in Lillooet, British Columbia (1884–87)
- Tulameen Gold Rush, near Princeton, British Columbia
- Tierra del Fuego Gold Rush, southernmost Chile and Argentina (1884–1906)
- Baja California Gold Rush, in the Santa Clara mountains about sixty miles southeast of Ensenada (1889)
- Amur gold rush, on the China-Russia border. Some miners in the region formed independent proto-states such as the Zheltuga Republic.

=== 1890s ===
- Cripple Creek Gold Rush, Cripple Creek, Colorado (1891)
- Western Australian gold rushes, Kalgoorlie and Coolgardie, Western Australia (1893, 1896)
- Mount Baker Gold Rush, Whatcom County, Washington, United States (1897–1920s)
- Klondike Gold Rush, centered on Dawson City, Yukon, Canada (1896–99)
- Atlin Gold Rush, Atlin, British Columbia (1898)
- Nome Gold Rush, Nome, Alaska (1899–1909)
- Fairview Goldrush, Oliver (Fairview), British Columbia, Canada

=== 20th century ===
- Fairbanks Gold Rush, Fairbanks, Alaska (1902–05)
- Goldfield Gold Rush, Goldfield, Nevada
- Porcupine Gold Rush, 1909–11, Timmins, Ontario, Canada – little known, but one of the largest in terms of gold mined, 67 million ounces as of 2001
- Iditarod Gold Rush, Flat, Alaska, 1910–12, where gold was discovered by John Beaton and William A. Dikeman in 1908
- Soviet gold rush - notably involving Gulag slave labor in the Kolyma region
- Andacollo gold rush, Chile, 1932–1938
- Kakamega gold rush, Kenya, 1932
- Vatukoula Gold Rush, Fiji, 1932
- Serra Pelada, Brazil
- Mount Diwata Gold Rush, Monkayo, Philippines, 1983–1987
- Amazon Gold Rush, Amazon region, Brazil
- Mount Kare Gold Rush, Enga Province, Papua New Guinea

=== 21st century ===
- Great Mongolian Gold Rush, Mongolia (2001)
- Bouaflé Gold Rush, Ivory Coast (2005)
- Apuí Gold Rush, Apuí, Amazonas, Brazil (2006); approximately 500,000 miners are thought to work in the Amazon's gold mines (Brazilian Portuguese: garimpos).
- Peruvian Amazon gold rush, Madre de Dios (2009)
- Tibesti Mountains gold rush, Chad, Libya and Niger (2012)
- Djado Plateau Gold Rush, Ténéré Desert and Aïr Massif, Niger (2014)
- Gold rush in South Kivu, Democratic Republic of the Congo (2021)
- Gold rush in Cheporor, Kanyarkwat, Kenya (2026).

== See also ==
- Bandwagon effect
- Diamond rush
