= List of preserved Lockheed aircraft =

List of Lockheed aircraft in preservation

This article is a list of aircraft that were manufactured by the Lockheed Corporation and its successor Lockheed Martin Corporation, and are in preservation, most of them are on static display while some are stored and awaiting their current status.

== Currently preserved ==
=== C-5 Galaxy ===
Aircraft	Photograph	Model	Build date	First flight	Last flight	Operator	Location	Status	Notes	Ref.
69-0014		C-5A	1971	August 1971	August 7, 2013	United States Air Force	Air Mobility Command Museum at Dover Air Force Base, Dover, Delaware	On static display		
70-0451		C-5A	1972	1972	July 26, 2017	United States Air Force	Travis Air Force Base Heritage Center at Travis Air Force Base, Fairfield, California	On static display		

=== L-1011 Tristar ===
Aircraft	Photograph	Model	Build date	First flight	Last flight	Operator	Location	Status	Notes	Ref.
N1011		L-1011-1	1970	November 16, 1970	August 1986	Lockheed Corporation	Delta Flight Museum in Atlanta, Georgia	On static display	Nose only	
C-FTNA		L-1011-1	1972	December 1972	July 6, 2001	Eastern Air Lines; Air Canada; Air Transat; Air France; Air Transat	Lyon–Saint-Exupéry Airport in Lyon, France	On static display	Damaged in a hailstorm as Air Transat Flight TSC906	
N31019		L-1011-50	1974	April 1974	2006	Trans World Airlines; Northeast Airlines; Northeast Bolivian Airways	National Airline History Museum at the Charles B. Wheeler Downtown Airport in Kansas City, Missouri	On static display		
TT-DWE		L-1011-100	1974	November 1974	January 2009	British Airways; Caledonian Airways; Aer Lingus; Caledonian Airways; Ducor World Airlines; International Air Services; AMW Chad	Emirates National Auto Museum in Abu Dhabi, United Arab Emirates	On static display	Named "Babbacombe Bay" by British Airways. Named "Loch Fyne" by Caledonian Airways. Named "St Kilian / Cillian" by Aer Lingus.	
HZ-AHP		L-1011-200	1980	September 1980	October 1998	Saudi Arabian Airlines	Royal Saudi Air Force Museum in Riyadh, Saudi Arabia	On static display	On display as a gate guardian	
9Y-TGN		L-1011-500	1980	August 1980	May 2004	BWIA West Indies Airways; BWIA International Airways	Chaguaramas Military History and Aerospace Museum in Chaguaramas, Trinidad	On static display		
N910TE		L-1011-1	1974	July 1974	July 15, 2017	Pacific Southwest Airlines; Lockheed Corporation; Aeroperú; Worldways Canada; EY Young; International Jet Charter; Operation Blessing; Eagle Jet Aviation; Operation Blessing; TriStar Experience	Kansas City International Airport in Kansas City, Missouri	On static display	Operated by the Flying Hospital group as P4-MED	
HS-AXE		L-1011-1	1974	December 1974	March 2016	Delta Air Lines; Jet Midwest; Thai Sky Airlines	Bangkok, Thailand	On static display	Preserved as a bar/restaurant	
9Q-CHC		L-1011-385-3	1981	May 1981	March 2018	Air Canada; Delta Air Lines; Hewa Bora Airways	Parc de la Vallée de la Nsele near Kinshasa, Democratic Republic of the Congo	On static display	Awaiting conversion into a bar/restaurant	
CS-TMP		L-1011-385-3	1985	June 1985	July 11, 2004	The Royal Jordanian Airline; Royal Jordanian; TAP Air Portugal; Caribjet; Air India; Caribjet; BWIA International; Novair; Air Algérie; Novair; Air Luxor; Air Algérie; Air Luxor; Luzair	Red Sea	Sunken	In use as an underwater attraction for scuba divers at the King Abdullah Reef dive site	
N102CK		L-1011-200F	1980	November 1980	May 2000	British Airways; Kuwait Airways; American International Airways; Kitty Hawk International; Lanta Aviation	Kavala International Airport in Chrysoupoli, Greece	Stored	Named "The Piccadilly Rose" by British Airways between 1981 and 1988. Named "Poole Bay" by British Airways in 1988	
N388LS		L-1011-500	1984	March 1984	October 25, 2011	The Royal Jordanian Airline; Ecuatoriana de Aviación; The Royal Jordanian Airline; Royal Jordanian; Sudan Airways; Royal Jordanian; Air Lanka; Royal Jordanian; Garuda Indonesia; Jetstream Holding; Marshall Aerospace; Sheikh Abdul Aziz; Saudi Arabian Government; Sands Aviation	Chic Chic Market, Nong Khai, Thailand	On static display		

=== L-1049 Super Constellation ===
Aircraft	Photograph	Build date	First flight	Last flight	Operator	Location	Status	Notes	Ref.
VH-EAG		1951	July 14, 1951	April 1963	United States Air Force; Mississippi Air National Guard; West Virginia Air National Guard; Pennsylvania Air National Guard; Historic Aircraft Restoration Society	Albion Park, New South Wales	Operational		
F-BGNJ/F-BRAD		1953	November 1953	1973	Air France; Catair	Nantes Atlantique Airport in Bouguenais, Pays de la Loire, France	On static display		
CF-TGE		1954	May 1954	September 2009	Trans-Canada Air Lines	Museum of Flight, Seattle, Washington	On static display		
HB-RSC		1955	November 1955	April 1972	United States Air Force; Mississippi ANG; West Virginia ANG; Smithsonian NASM; Aviation Specialties Inc.; Goodyear; Globe Air Inc.; Benny Younesi and Mehrdad Khoramian; Classic Air; Super Constellation Flyers Association	Basel, Switzerland	Operational		

=== Vega ===
Serial	Photograph	Model	Build date	Operator	Location	Status	Notes	Ref.
22		Vega 5B	1930	Amelia Earhart; Franklin Institute of Philadelphia, Pennsylvania	National Air and Space Museum in Washington, D.C.	On static display	Nicknamed "Little Red Bus" by Amelia Earhart	
40		Vega 2D	1929	Donald Baxter MacMillan	The Henry Ford Museum in Dearborn, Michigan.	On static display		
72		Vega 5C	1929	Independent Oil and Gas Company	Mount Dora, Florida.	Undergoing restoration to airworthy status by Kevin Kimball		
122		Vega 5C	1930	Florence C. Hall; Wiley Post	National Air and Space Museum in Washington D.C.	On static display	Nicknamed "Winnie Mae"	
161		DL-1B		John O. Magoffin Jr.; Rick Barter	Mid America Flight Museum of Mount Pleasant, Texas.	On static display		
203		Vega 5C	1933	Walter Bowe; James Harold Doolittle	Jimmy Doolittle Museum	On static display	Nicknamed "Shell Oil Number 7"	

== Formerly preserved, scrapped ==
=== RAF Tristar ===
Aircraft	Photograph	Build date	First flight	Last flight	Operator	Last seen	Scrap date	Cause of scrapping	Notes	Ref.
ZD948		1978	October 1978	March 1983	Lockheed; British Airways; Royal Air Force; CSDS Aircraft Sales and Leasing; LJ Properties; Aero Airtanker; Tempus Applied Solutions	Bruntingthorpe Aerodrome, Leicestershire, England, United Kingdom	February 2022 – March 2022	Aging airframe	Named "The Princess Margaret Rose" by British Airways	
ZD950		1979	April 1979	March 24, 2014	British Airways; Royal Air Force; CSDS Aircraft Sales and Leasing; LJ Properties; Aero Airtanker; Tempus Applied Solutions	Bruntingthorpe Aerodrome, Leicestershire, England, United Kingdom	March 13, 2022	Aging airframe	Named "The English Miss Rose" by British Airways	
ZD951		1979	May 1979	March 23, 2014	British Airways; Royal Air Force; CSDS Aircraft Sales and Leasing; LJ Properties; Aero Airtanker; Tempus Applied Solutions	Bruntingthorpe Aerodrome, Leicestershire, England, United Kingdom	February 24, 2022	Aging airframe	Named "The Astral Rose" by British Airways	
ZD953		1980	May 1980	March 19, 2014	British Airways; Royal Air Force; CSDS Aircraft Sales and Leasing; LJ Properties; Aero Airtanker; Tempus Applied Solutions	Bruntingthorpe Aerodrome, Leicestershire, England, United Kingdom	March 28, 2022	Aging airframe	Named "Elizabeth of Glamis" by British Airways	
ZE704		1980	June 1980	March 25, 2014	Pan Am; Royal Air Force; CSDS Aircraft Sales and Leasing; LJ Properties; Aero Airtanker; Tempus Applied Solutions	Bruntingthorpe Aerodrome, Leicestershire, England, United Kingdom	April 10, 2022	Aging airframe	Named "Clipper Bald Eagle" by Pan Am	
ZE705		1980	July 1980	March 12, 2014	Pan Am; Royal Air Force; CSDS Aircraft Sales and Leasing; LJ Properties; Aero Airtanker; Tempus Applied Solutions	Bruntingthorpe Aerodrome, Leicestershire, England, United Kingdom	April 4, 2022	Aging airframe	Named "Clipper Golden Eagle" by Pan Am	
