= Mišović =

Origin
- Language: Serbo-Croatian
- Region of origin: Balkans

Mišović (Serbian Cyrillic: Мишовић) is a Serbian surname, derived from the male given name Mišo. It may refer to:

- Nenad Mišović, assassin of Ratko Djokić
- Jordan Misja (Mišović), one of the three heroes of Skadar
- Radmilo Mišović, Yugoslav basketball player
- Vladimir Mišović, Serbian water polo player
- a brotherhood of the Vasojevići tribe

== See also ==
- Mišević, settlement in Serbia
- Mišić, surname
- Mišković, surname
- Mišovice, settlement in Czech Republic
