= Baljci, Tomislavgrad =

Baljci Баљци
- Village
- Baljci within Bosnia and Herzegovina
- Coordinates: 43°49′22″N 17°13′08″E
- Country: Bosnia and Herzegovina
- Entity: Federation of Bosnia and Herzegovina
- Canton: Canton 10
- Municipality: Tomislavgrad
- Local community: Šujica

Area
  - Total: 20.39 km^{2} (7.87 sq mi)
  - Land: 20.39 km^{2} (7.87 sq mi)
  - Water: 0 km^{2} (0 sq mi) 0%

Population (2013)
  - Total: 0
  - Density: 0.0/km^{2} (0.0/sq mi)
- Time zone: UTC+1 (CET)
  - Summer (DST): UTC+2 (CEST)
- Postal code: 80240

Baljci (Serbian Cyrillic: Баљци) is a village in the Municipality of Tomislavgrad in Canton 10 of the Federation of Bosnia and Herzegovina, an entity of Bosnia and Herzegovina. The village belongs to the local community of Šujica. Until 1945, the village was administratively part of the srez of Livno.

Ethnic Serbs primarily populated the village with a Croat minority. The main economic activity was animal husbandry. After World War II, the population declined due to economic emigration. Before the outbreak of the Bosnian War in 1992, most villagers left the area. In April of that year, the village became uninhabited after Croat forces arrested the remaining Serbs and murdered two civilians. In 2015, two Serb former residents returned to the village.

== History ==
Baljci village was populated mainly by ethnic Serbs, with a Croat minority. The Serb population included the Cvjetić, Mišković, Velimir and Ćevap families. The Croat families were named Križanac, Marković, Krstanović and Nevistić. Until 1945, the village was administratively part of the srez of Livno. It belonged to the local community seated in Šujica, which also used to be part of Livno.

During World War II, the local Serb population generally did not endure major persecution due to their good standing with Croats from Šujica. In June 1941, some Baljci residents were arrested and tortured by the Ustaše. The same year, three residents were shot dead in individual shootings by the Ustaše or the occupying Italian forces. Baljci was among the first Serb-majority villages in the region between Livno and Tomislavgrad to join the Yugoslav Partisans. Thirteen Serb residents of Baljci were killed as Partisans, five Croats were killed as members of the Ustaše, three as members of the Croatian Home Guard—seven of whom were killed during the Bleiburg repatriations of 1945. In total, 20 Serb and two Croat civilians were killed during the war. After the war, Baljci was among nine villages of the Municipality of Duvno without the basic organisation of the local League of Communists of Yugoslavia; farmers seldom joined the Communist Party.

After World War II, the population started to decline for economic reasons. In mid-1945, preparations for the colonisation of Vojvodina started. Twenty-one Serb villagers left for Tovariševo and one for Obrovac in the Municipality of Bačka Palanka. The Croat Krstanović and Nevistić families left the village for economic emigration between 1955 and 1960.

According to the 1991 census, forty Serbs and three Croats were in the village. Most of the population had left the village before the outbreak of the Bosnian War in 1992, including the Croat Križanac family, an elderly couple. Only seven Serbs remained in the village.

After the Battle of Kupres in April 1992, retreating Croat forces entered Baljci, arrested four Serb men and murdered two elderly women. The remaining male civilian escaped but died while retreating towards Serb-held Kupres. All remaining buildings in the village were burned. According to the 2013 census, the village was uninhabited.

In 2015, two former Serb residents returned to Baljci to work as cattlemen. They were welcomed by the municipal and cantonal officials and the local Serbian Orthodox Church.

In Baljci are 33 stećci monumental medieval tombstones. In one of the Eastern Orthodox cemeteries, there are several old crosses with no inscription; according to a local tradition, the graves belong to the Bujas family, who arrived in Baljci from Baljci, Bileća in eastern Herzegovina. Another Eastern Orthodox cemetery has several carved wooden crosses.

== Geography ==
Baljci is located on the slopes of the mountain Ljubuša, south of the Kupreško Polje and north of the Šujičko Polje. It is at an altitude of 1,300 metres (4,300 ft). The village is located on a barren mountainside that serves as a pasture. Due to the high altitude, the winters are long. The nearby mountain Želivodić is covered with forest. The village had two hamlets, Cvetići and Velimiri, distanced from 500 to 1,000 metres (1,600 to 3,300 ft).

== Economy ==
The main economic activity in the village used to be animal husbandry and dairy farming; milk products were mostly sold on the Dalmatian coast. There is one sheep farm, reported in 2021. One of the widespread economic activities was also foresting in the nearby Želivodić mountain.

In January 2020, the Government of the Federation of Bosnia and Herzegovina gave preliminary approval to four local companies to be issued energy permits for the construction of a wind farm in the Municipality of Tomislavgrad, including Baljci. The Ministry of Energy, Mining and Industry of the Federation of Bosnia and Herzegovina issued a draft permit for the wind farm in September 2020. The Baljci wind farm will have a capacity of 48 MW, and its annual energy production is projected to be 145.7 GWh. The investor in the wind farm is a Tomislavgrad-based company, Tomkup.

== Demographics ==
Ethnic group	Population 1961	%	Population 1971	%	Population 1981	%	Population 1991	%	Population 2013	%
Croats	85	43.37	29	19.20	6	9.23	3	6.98	0	
Serbs	111	56.63	122	80.80	59	90.77	40	93.02	0	
Total	196		151		65		43		0	

== Bibliography ==
=== Books ===
- Ethnicity/National Affiliation, Religion and Mother Tongue (PDF). Sarajevo: Agency for Statistics of Bosnia and Herzegovina. 2019.
- Ivić, Anto (2019). Društvene i gospodarske prilike na Kupresu od 19. do polovice 20. stoljeća: doktorski rad [The societal and economic circumstances in Kupres from 19th to the mid-20th century: doctoral thesis] (in Croatian). Zadar: Sveučilište u Zadru.
- Karan, Milan (2016). Srbi Duvna [The Serbs of Duvno] (in Serbian). Aranđelovac: Udruženje građana "Srbi Duvna" Beograd. ISBN 9788691967307.
- Milić, Angelika (2000). "Popis nekropola duvanjskog područja" [The list of necropolis of the region of Duvno]. In Krišto, Jure (ed.). Duvanjski zbornik [The collection of papers of Duvno] (in Croatian). Zagreb-Tomislavgrad: Hrvatski institut za povijest–Naša ognjišta–Zajednica Duvnjaka Tomislavgrad. ISBN 9536324253.
- Nacionalni sastav stanovništva [The national composition of the population] (PDF) (in Serbo-Croatian). Sarajevo: Državni zavod za statistiku Republike Bosne i Hercegovine. 1994.
- Nacionalni sastav stanovništva FNR Jugoslavije [The national composition of the population of the FNR Yugoslavia] (PDF) (in Serbo-Croatian). Vol. 3. Belgrade: Savezni zavod za statistiku. 1994.
- Nacionalni sastav stanovništva SFR Jugoslavije [The national composition of the population of the FNR Yugoslavia] (PDF) (in Serbo-Croatian). Vol. 1. Belgrade: Savezni zavod za statistiku. 1994.
- Nacionalni sastav stanovništva SFR Jugoslavije [The national composition of the population of the FNR Yugoslavia] (PDF) (in Serbo-Croatian). Vol. 2. Belgrade: Savezni zavod za statistiku. 1994.
- Penava, Šimun (2000). "Duvanjske žrtve Hrvata Drugog svjetskog rata" [The Croat victims of Duvno during World War II]. In Krišto, Jure (ed.). Duvanjski zbornik [The collection of papers of Duvno] (in Croatian). Zagreb-Tomislavgrad: Hrvatski institut za povijest–Naša ognjišta–Zajednica Duvnjaka Tomislavgrad. ISBN 9536324253.
- Zelenika, Andjelko; Rajković, Salih; Atanacković-Salčić, Vukosava; Sandžaktar, Meliha; Fazlibegović, Husein; Rajić, Ćiro (1977). Spomenici prirode i kulture duvanjskog područja [Natural and cultural monuments of the Duvno region] (in Serbo-Croatian). Mostar: Regionalni zavod za zaštitu spomenika kulture i prirode.

=== Journals ===
- Lučić, Ivica (2012). "Duvno kao žarište "hrvatskog nacionalizma i katoličkog klerikalizma" u zadnjem desetljeću komunističke vlasti" [Duvno as the focus of "Croatian nationalism and Catholic clericalism" in the last decade of the communist rule]. Časopis za suvremenu povijest (in Croatian). 44 (3). Zagreb: Hrvatski institut za povijest: 571–602.

=== News articles ===
- Radulovikj, Stefan (16 January 2020). "Bosnia's Federation govt gives prelim approval to four wind farm projects". Renewables Now. Sofia.
- "Draft energy permit adopted for 48 MW Pakline 2 wind farm". Balkan Green Energy News. Belgrade. 21 September 2020.
- Karačić, Milenko (21 May 2021). "Ne odlaze svi mladi s rodne grude" [Not all young people leave the homeland]. Hrvatska radiotelevizija (in Croatian). Zagreb.
- "Načelnik Vukadin posjetio povratničku obitelj u Baljcima" [Municipal President Vukadin visited the returnee family in Baljci]. Općina Tomislavgrad (in Croatian). Tomislavgrad. 16 June 2015.
