= Josip Mišić =

Josip Mišić may refer to:

- Josip Mišić (footballer, born 1986), Croatian left-back for NK Vinogradar
- Josip Mišić (footballer, born 1994), Croatian attacking midfielder for Dinamo Zagreb
