= Mišić =

Origin
- Languages: Serbian, Croatian, Bosnian

Mišić is a Serbian, Bosnian, and Croatian surname, derived from the male given name Mišo, or from the singular meaning "small mouse" and "muscle". Notable people with this name include:

- Aleksandar Mišić (1891–1941), Serbian military commander
- Alojzije Mišić (1859–1942), Bosnian Croat Catholic bishop
- Bojan Mišić (born 1978), Serbian footballer
- Božidar Mišić (born 1902), first Bosnian professional watch maker
- Biljana Mišić (born 1983), Serbian actress
- Janko Mišić (1900–1929), Yugoslav politician
- Jelena Mišić, Yugoslav-Canadian computer scientist
- Josip Mišić (born 1986), Croatian footballer
- Josip Mišić (born 1994), Croatian footballer
- Katarina Mišić (born 1976), Serbian tennis coach
- Matija Mišić (born 1992), Croatian footballer
- Milana Misic (born 1970), Finnish singer of partly Croatian descent
- Petar Mišić (1863–1921), Serbian and Yugoslav general
- Petar Mišić (born 1994), Croatian footballer
- Saša Mišić (born 1987), Serbian footballer
- Saša Mišić (born 1987), Montenegrin water polo player
- Siniša Mišić (born 1961), Serbian historian
- Mijo Mišić (1965–2022), Bosnian professional boxer
- Slobodan Misic-Brenda (born 1942), Canadian handball coach and author
- Živojin Mišić (1855–1921), Serbian and early Yugoslav general
- Živorad Mišić (born 1986), Serbian footballer

== See also ==
- Mišović, surname
- Mišević, settlement in Serbia
