= Dejan Mišković =

Dejan Mišković is the name of:

- Dejan Mišković (basketball) (born 1974), Serbian former basketball player.
- Dejan Mišković (footballer) (born 1985), Croatian football player.
