= Imotica =

- Village
- Location within Croatia
- Country: Croatia
- County: Dubrovnik-Neretva County
- Municipality: Dubrovačko Primorje

Area
  - Total: 1.8 sq mi (4.7 km^{2})

Population (2021)
  - Total: 47
  - Density: 26/sq mi (10/km^{2})
- Time zone: UTC+1 (CET)
  - Summer (DST): UTC+2 (CEST)

Imotica is a village in Dubrovnik-Neretva County on the Dubrovnik Coast.

== Demographics ==
According to the 2021 census, its population was 47, while it was 122 in 2011.

== Notable people ==
- Andro Vlahušić - Croatian politician
- Peter Miscovich - inventor
- John Miscovich - (Imotica origin) inventor of Intelligiant water cannon
