= Gyroscopic autopilot =

Type of autopilot system

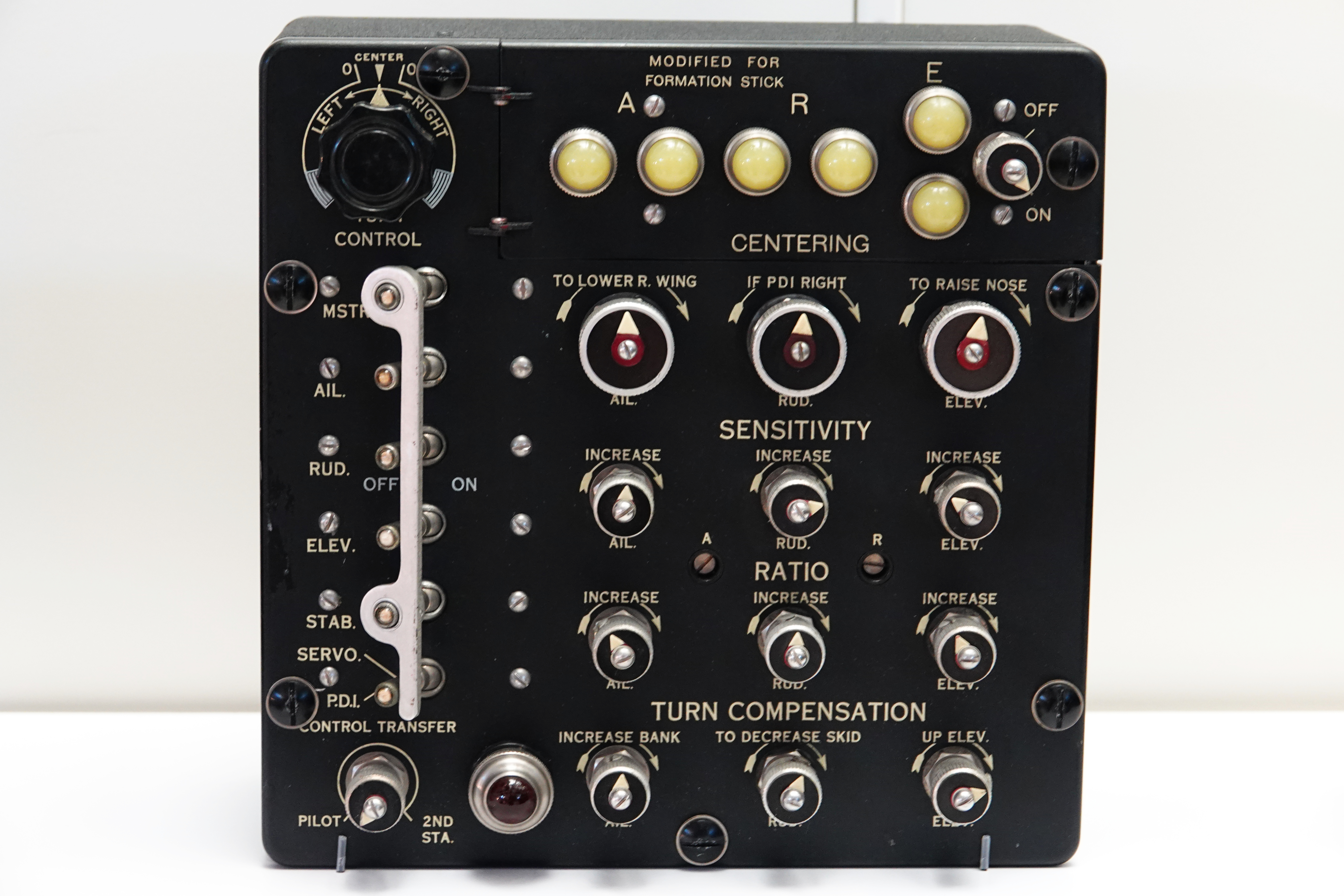
The control panel for the Minneapolis-Honeywell C-1 gyroscopic autopilot, used on B-24 bombers.

The gyroscopic autopilot was a type of autopilot system developed primarily for aviation uses in the early 20th century. Since then, the principles of this autopilot has been the basis of many different aircraft control systems, both military and civilian.

== Early development ==
The Sperry Corporation developed the original gyroscopic autopilot in 1912. The device was called a “gyroscopic stabilizer apparatus,” and its purpose was to improve stability and control of aircraft. It utilized the inputs from several other instruments to allow an aircraft to automatically maintain a desired compass heading and altitude.

The key feature of the gyroscopic stabilizer apparatus was that it incorporated a gyroscope to regulate the control surfaces of the aircraft. Lawrence Sperry managed to design a smaller and lighter version of a gyroscope, and the device was integrated into an aircraft's hydraulic control system. Using a negative feedback loop, the gyroscope automatically adjusted the control surfaces of an aircraft to maintain straight and level flight.

== First use ==
Lawrence Sperry's autopilot was first demonstrated in France on June 18, 1914. Sperry was participating in an exhibition in which 57 planes were fitted with new improvements and innovations. Sperry's aircraft, a Curtiss C-2, was the only one equipped with a gyroscopic stabilizer. Sperry, along with his assistant Emil Cachin, made three passes in front of a grandstand full of spectators and military observers. On his first pass, Sperry engaged the autopilot and flew past the grandstand with his hands held high off of the controls. On the second pass, Cachin climbed out onto the starboard wing seven feet away from the fuselage with Sperry's hands still off the controls. When the aircraft banked due to the shift in weight, the autopilot immediately stabilized the wings. On his final pass, Sperry climbed out onto the opposite wing, leaving the pilot seat empty. The observers were amazed at the aircraft's ability to maintain level flight without a pilot manually controlling it. Sperry also gave Joseph Barres, Commandant of the French Army Air Corps, a ride to demonstrate his device's ability to perform an unassisted takeoff and landing.

== Achievements ==
Wiley Post became famous after his record setting trip around the world on June 23, 1931. In his aircraft, a Lockheed Vega nicknamed “Winnie Mae,” he managed to travel around the world in eight days 15 hours and 51 minutes. He accomplished this with the help of Harold Gatty, who served as his navigator and copilot. Two years later he set out to beat his previous record by flying around the world by himself. He wanted to prove that one man could accomplish the same trip without a copilot. In order to accomplish this, he equipped the Winnie Mae with a Sperry gyroscope autopilot and a radio direction finder. Although he experienced some problems with the autopilot, he completed the trip in seven days, 18 hours and 49 minutes. The use of the autopilot and radio direction finder is credited for making the task of navigating the aircraft much easier and more efficient. The use of an autopilot reduced the physical and mental demands on Post as he flew around the world.

== Early military applications ==
The U.S. Army Air Corps and the U.S. Navy experimented with autopilots on military aircraft before and during World War II. Straight and level flight had become a necessity for new level bombing techniques that were being developed at the time. The Sperry Gyroscope Company developed many autopilot systems for use on military aircraft. When the Boeing B-17 Flying Fortress was delivered in the late 1930s, it came equipped a commercial Sperry A-3 Autopilot. The A-3 was a simple autopilot and only corrected angular deviations in the aircraft's straight and level course. It utilized pneumatic hydraulic servos, which had a tendency to react slowly to inputs, and this often led to overcompensation of the aircraft's corrected course. This caused navigation and control issues when pilots were flying in poor weather or rough air.

To fix these problems, the Sperry A-5 autopilot was developed. This was the first all electric autopilot. This new autopilot used three dual-element vacuum tube amplifiers and high-speed gyros. Each amplifier was associated with a different axis: Yaw, pitch, and roll. The high-speed gyros were more sensitive and established a base reference level of the aircraft's level flight path. Whenever the aircraft deviated from the base reference level, the autopilot adjusted for the amount of time that occurred between the changes in reference levels. This allowed the autopilot to detect the velocity and acceleration of the change. The calculated change was then communicated quickly to the control surfaces by independent electro-hydraulic servos. This led to faster, more stable corrections of the aircraft.

The faster stabilization of the aircraft by the A-5 autopilot made it possible for new bombsights to be used on military aircraft. The Norden Bombsight and Sperry Bombsight were both used onboard Army and Navy bombers during the war. Both bombsights used gyroscopes, telescopes and analog computers to calculate the release point for bombers to drop their payloads accurately onto ground targets. The A-5 had the ability to be integrated with these bombsights. Once the bombardier found the target and adjusted the bombsight, the autopilot would be engaged to fly the aircraft straight and level to the target, where the bombsight would automatically calculate the release point of the bombs.

=== Missiles ===
The German V-1 Buzz Bomb also used an autopilot system for guidance. It used a pendulum system that was damped by a gyroscope, similar to the ones used in Sperry autopilots. It also used radio direction-finding to maintain course. The use of autopilot on unmanned weapons can be seen as the precursor to modern cruise missiles.
