= Misko (surname) =

Misko is a surname of Slavic origin. The Hungarian form of the name is Miskó. Notable people with the surname include:

- Ágnes Miskó (born 1971), Hungarian gymnast
- Igor Misko (1986–2010), Russian ice hockey player
- Joanne Pierce Misko (1941–2024), American nun and FBI agent
- John Misko (born 1954), American football player
- Stefan Misko (1912–1986), Ukrainian-born Australian entomologist, painter and community leader
- Zsuzsa Miskó (born 1971), Hungarian gymnast

== See also ==
- Miško, given name
