= John Beaton (disambiguation) =

John Beaton (born 1982) is a Scottish FIFA referee.

John Beaton may also refer to:

- John Beaton (courtier) (1538–1570), servant of Mary, Queen of Scots
- John Beaton (miner) (1875–1945), Canadian gold miner and businessman
- Jack Beaton or John Beaton (1914–1996), Australian rugby league player
- John Beaton (Canadian football) (born 1950)
