= Krstanović =

Krstanović (Serbian Cyrillic: Крстановић) is a surname. Notable people with the surname include:

- Ivan Krstanović (born 1983), Bosnian-Croatian footballer
- Zdravko Krstanović (1950–2024), Serbian poet and journalist
- Zoran Krstanović (born 1982), Serbian basketball player
