= John Beaton (miner) =

American miner

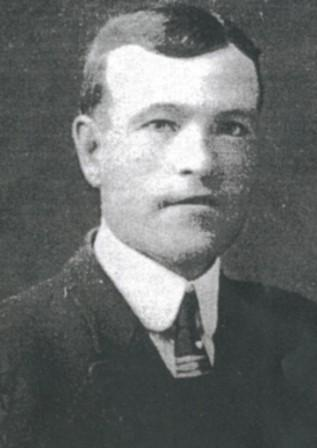
- Born: August 9, 1875; Judique, Nova Scotia, Canada
- Died: June 1945 (aged 69); Ophir, Alaska, US
- Occupations: Gold miner, businessman
- Known for: Co-discoverer of gold near Iditarod, Alaska

John Beaton (August 9, 1875 – June 1945) was a gold miner and businessman whose discovery of gold in Flat, Alaska, began the Iditarod Gold Rush.

== Gold mining ==
In 1908, Beaton began prospecting near Iditarod, Alaska, with his partner William A. Dikeman. Following an unavailing summer, they left the camp and drove a steam launch as far up the Iditarod River as they could manage. They beached the boat and built a cabin about 8 miles (13 km) south of Iditarod. On Christmas Day 1908, Beaton, Dikeman, and John's brother Murdock struck gold near the head of Otter Creek.

By the summer of 1909, news of the find had spread, and other prospectors began to claim the remaining ground around Otter Creek, and founded a nearby camp named Flat. By the spring of 1910, the boomtown had a population of over 2,000. Otter Creek was eventually found to contain the widest paystreak ever mined in Alaska, and the area became the third-largest Alaskan placer mining site, after Fairbanks and Nome.

Around 1937, Beaton sold his claims at Otter Creek, and began dredging on Ganes Creek in the Innoko District until World War II.

== Personal life ==
John Beaton was born on August 9, 1875, to a Scottish Roman Catholic family in Judique, Nova Scotia, Canada. Beaton's grandfather, Angus Beaton, had immigrated to Pictou, Nova Scotia from the Isle of Skye in 1801. Beaton left Nova Scotia in 1899 for the Klondike, but found that the Klondike Gold Rush had largely ended. He arrived in Alaska in 1900, and his travels between then and 1908 are uncertain.

Not long after the gold discovery at Flat, Beaton returned home to marry Florence MacLennan, a woman from Inverness County, but quickly brought her back to live at the mining camp. In 1918, Florence and two of their children died while passengers of the SS Princess Sophia, which sank en route to Seattle. In 1924, Beaton married Mae, another woman from Nova Scotia. In 1936, Beaton and his family moved to Anchorage.

In June 1945, Beaton and two other miners drowned in the Ganes Creek river after driving off of a bridge, apparently because the driver had a heart attack. Beaton is buried in Anchorage Memorial Park. In 2008, Alaska governor Sarah Palin honored his 1908 co-discovery of gold by naming an "Iditarod Gold Discovery Day".
