= Novair =

Swedish airline

IATA	ICAO	Call sign
N9	NVR	NAVIGATOR
- Founded: 1997; 29 years ago
- Ceased operations: 9 October 2023
- Hubs: Stockholm–Arlanda
- Fleet size: 2
- Destinations: 17
- Parent company: Jet Nordic Group
- Headquarters: Stockholm, Sweden
- Key people: Anders Fred (CEO)
- Employees: 137
- Website: www.novair.se

Nova Airlines AB, operating as Novair, was a Swedish airline headquartered in Stockholm, Sweden that operated on behalf of one of Sweden's largest travel agencies, Apollo. It was owned by Jet Nordic Group and operated charter flights mainly to the Mediterranean and the Canary Islands. Its main base and hub of operations was Stockholm Arlanda Airport, but the airline also operated from Oslo Airport, Copenhagen Airport, Gothenburg Landvetter Airport and Billund Airport. Novair closed on 9 October 2023.

== History ==
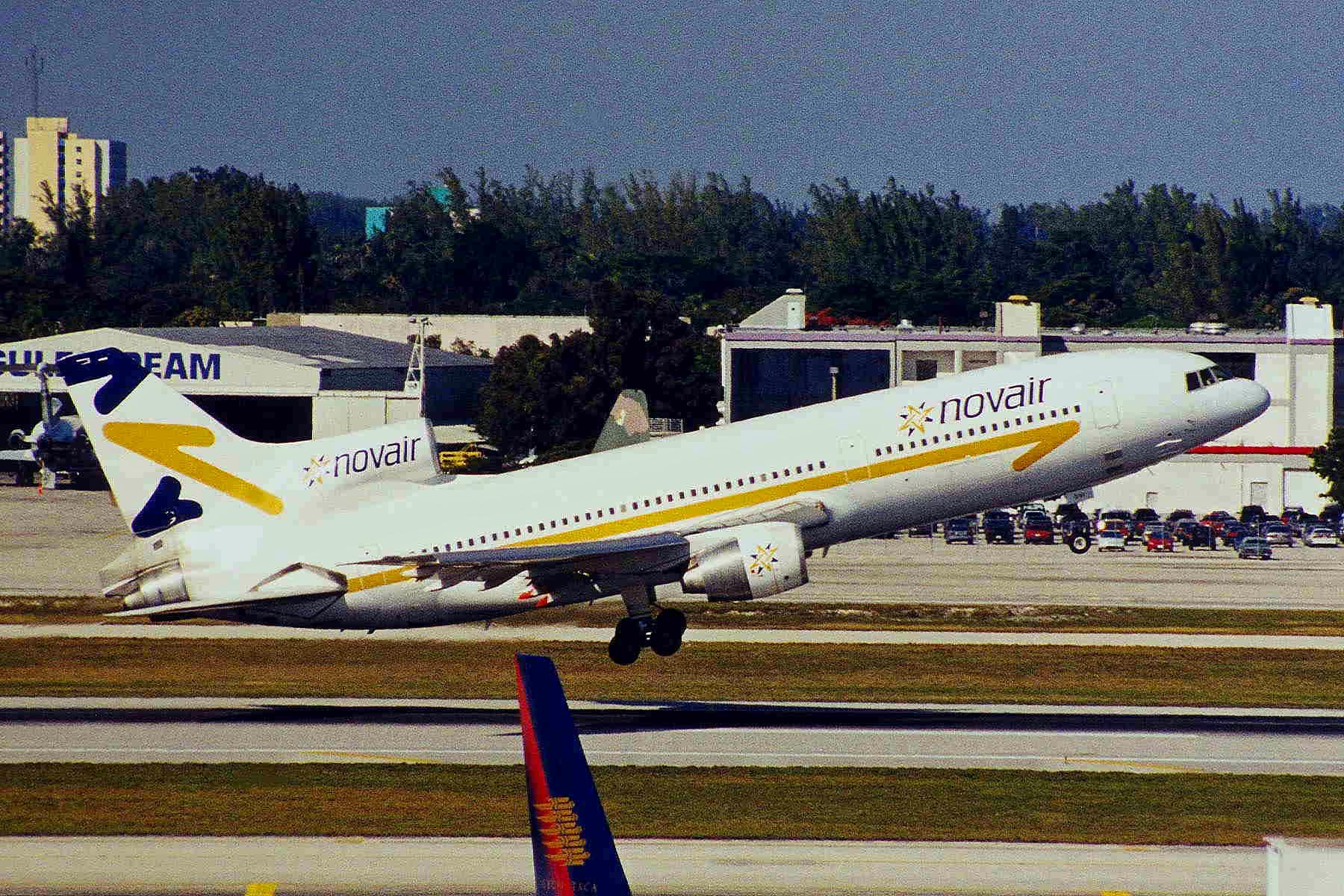
A former Novair Lockheed L-1011 TriStar departing Miami International Airport in 1999.

=== Foundation and early years ===
Novair was established and started operations in November 1997 with services from Stockholm to Phuket, Thailand and the Canary Islands of Spain on behalf of Apollo, a Swedish travel agency. In 1998, the airline began operating three more Lockheed L-1011 TriStar to destinations in the Far East and the Caribbean, and placed an order for three new Boeing 737-800 to operate destinations in the Mediterranean and Canary Islands. The airline replaced the L-1011 TriStar with two Airbus A330-200 and leased one from Swissair.

After the September 11 Attacks, Novair was forced to ground one of its Airbus A330-200 due to lack of demand, and leased out the aircraft to a Libyan company. In 2003, Novair took over the Cuban airline Cubana's flights from Cuba to destinations such as London, Madrid and Paris. The airline also replaced its Boeing fleet with new Airbus A321-200. After the 2004 Indian Ocean earthquake and tsunami, Novair were the first Swedish airline to arrive with relief supplies and doctors and to evacuate tourists. Novair also briefly leased an aircraft to Air Madrid in 2006, however, due to their bankruptcy, the aircraft was returned and was instead leased to Kuwait Airways in 2007. When the aircraft was returned from Kuwait, it was parked in Zürich to be stored, thus ending all A330 operations.

In 2009, Novair became the first and only Scandinavian airline to undertake EU project SESAR, and also participated in the MINT-Project to fly "green approaches", also known as continuous descent approaches to reduce fuel burn and noise. Novair also leased an Airbus A330-200 from Orbest and from Air Europa, to be operated with a cockpit crew from the respective airline, and a Novair cabin crew.

=== Development since 2010 ===
Between 2013 and 2014, Novair leased an Airbus A330-200 from Aer Lingus using the same crew composition, to operate their long-haul destinations. The airline also closes down its crew base at Gothenburg Landvetter Airport in March 2016.

The airline took delivery of two brand new Airbus A321neo aircraft in 2017. The airline originally ordered three aircraft, however, due to the closing of one of its hubs, it was reduced to two aircraft. The airline also operated an Airbus A320 aircraft from Titan Airways between 2016 and 2017 due to a delivery delay with their new aircraft. In 2019, the airline closed its crew base at Oslo Airport. All aircraft are placed at Stockholm Arlanda Airport.

As of 2018, The airline was owned by the German corporation DER Touristik which is a part of the REWE Group, and employed approximately 70 pilots and 245 cabin crew to operate their current fleet of Airbus A321neo aircraft. In April 2021, Novair announced that the airline will be sold to Denmark’s Jet Nordic Group. As a result, two airlines’s Airbus A321 aircraft were supposed to join the fleet of Jet Time, a Danish charter airline.

In February 2023, it was announced that Novair will cease operations in October 2023 due to a negative business perspective after the airline's owners failed to acquire new contracts. The current partnership with tour operator Apollo will end on this date. The airline ceased trading on 9 October 2023.

== Destinations ==
Novair operated flights from Stockholm, Gothenburg, Oslo, Copenhagen, Billund and Oulu to charter destinations on behalf of Apollo. The destinations varied depending on season and include locations in the Mediterranean, the Canary Islands and Egypt. In the past it also operated long-haul flights to destinations including Thailand, India, and Indonesia as well as the Caribbean.

== Fleet ==
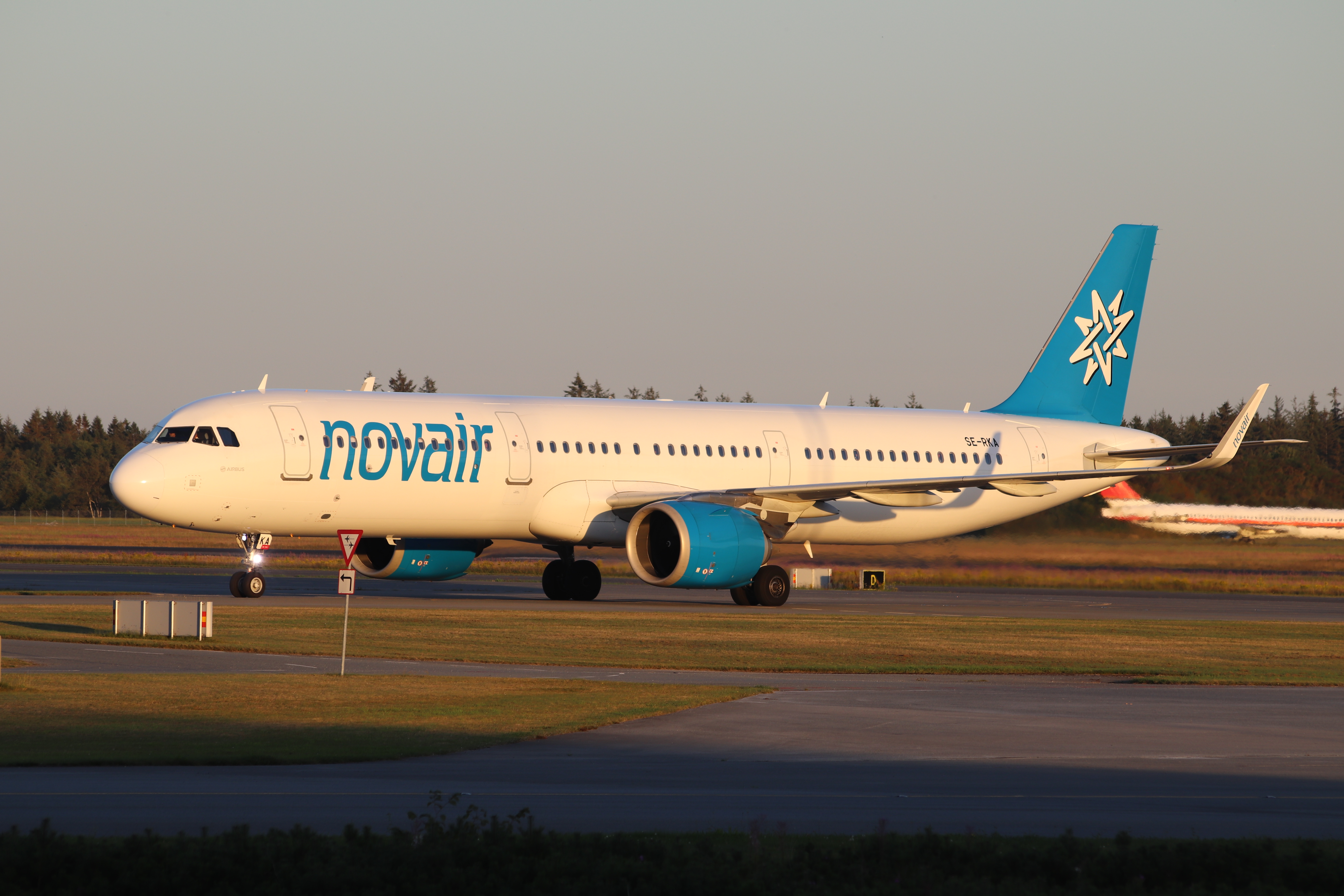
A Novair Airbus A321neo wearing the final livery.

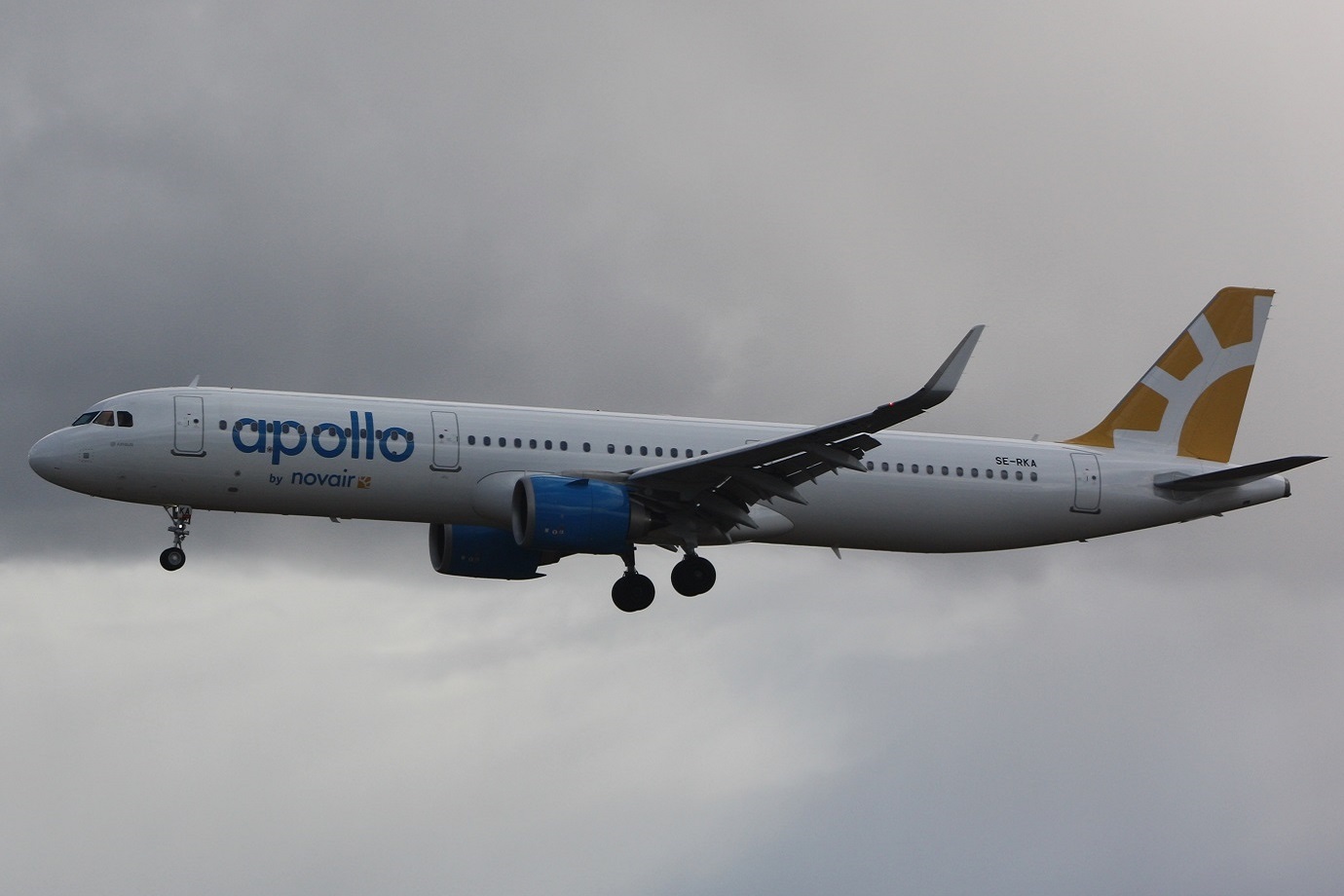
A former Novair Airbus A321neo operated for Apollo, 2018.

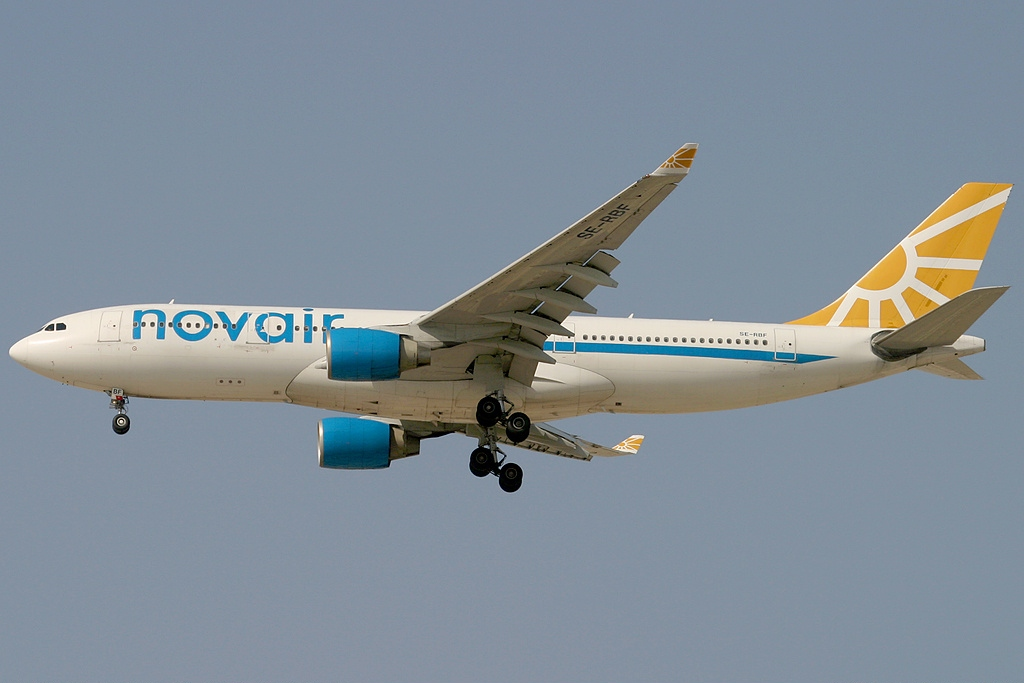
A former Novair Airbus A330-200 on approach to Dubai, 2006.

=== Current fleet ===
At the time of closure, the Novair fleet consisted of the following aircraft:

Current fleet
Aircraft	In service	Orders	Passengers	Notes
Airbus A321neo	2	—	221	
Total	2	—		

=== Former fleet ===
Formerly Novair also operated the following types of aircraft:

Aircraft	In service	Years	Notes
Airbus A320	3	1997 – 1998	Leased from TransAer
Airbus A320	1	1998 – 1999	
Airbus A320	1	2002 – 2003	Leased from Air Luxor
Airbus A320	1	2016 – 2017	Leased from Titan Airways
Airbus A321	3	2004 – 2017	
Airbus A321	1	2016 – 2017	Leased from SmartLynx Airlines
Airbus A330	1	1999 – 2000	Leased from Swissair
Airbus A330	2	2011 – 2013	Leased from Air Europa
Airbus A330	2	2013 – 2015	Leased from Aer Lingus
Airbus A330	1	2007 – 2009	Leased from Orbest
Airbus A330	2	2000 – 2007	
Boeing 737-300	1	1999	Leased from Air New Zealand
Boeing 737-800	3	1999 – 2005	
Lockheed L-1011 TriStar	3	1997 – 2000	
