= Miško =

Miško (Serbian: Мишко) is a South Slavic masculine given name. Notable people with the name include:

- Miško Jovanović (1878–1915), Bosnian Serb agent
- Miško Kranjec (1908–1983), Slovenian writer
- Miško Mirković (born 1966), retired Serbian footballer
- Miško Ražnatović (born 1966), Serbian lawyer and sports agent, and former basketball player
- Miško Šuvaković (born 1954), Serbian artist

== See also ==
- Misko, surname
- Mišković, surname
