= Winnie Mae =

Aircraft flown by Wiley Post

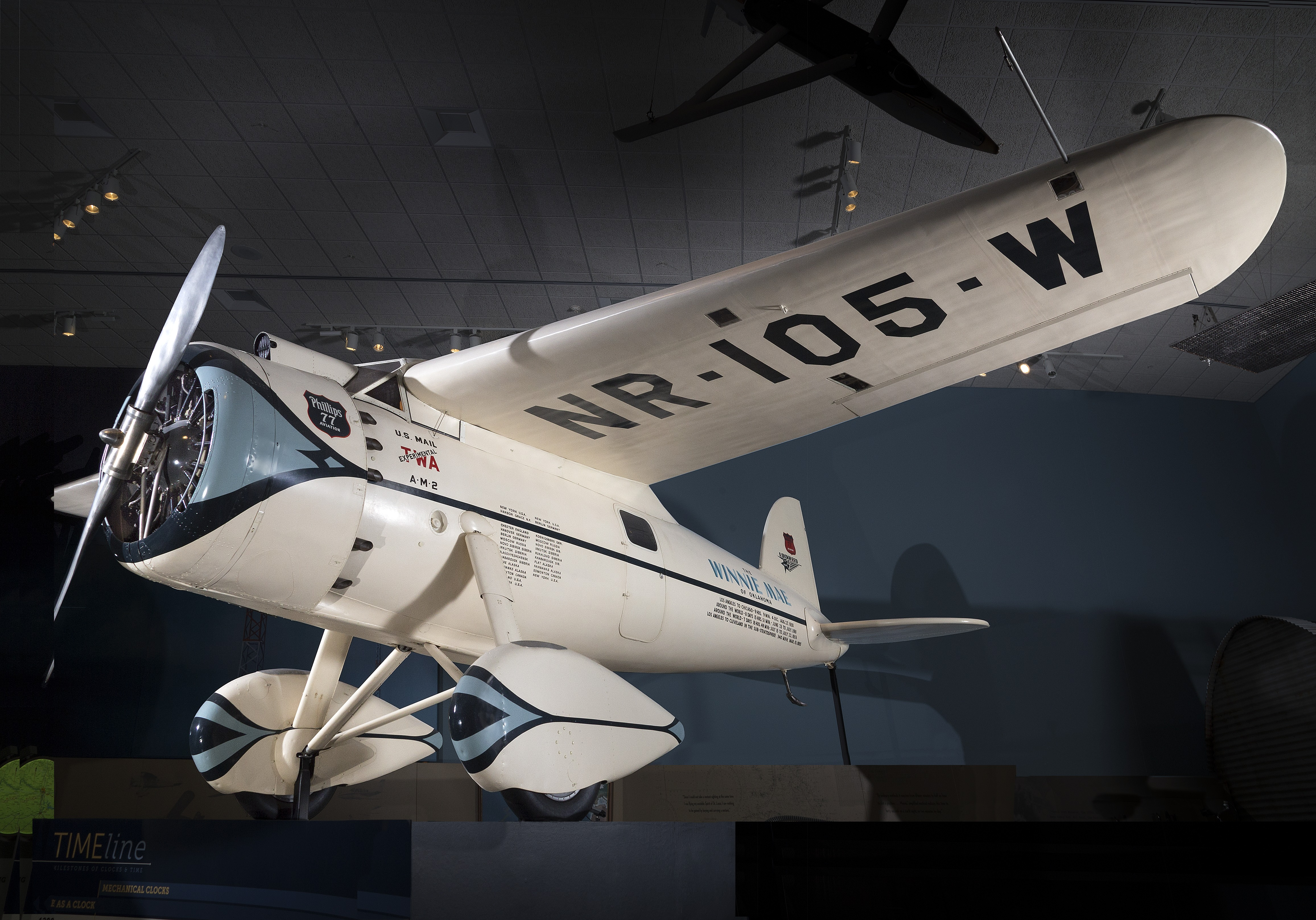
- Winnie Mae at the Smithsonian's Steven F. Udvar-Hazy Center

General information
- Type: Lockheed Vega
- Manufacturer: Lockheed Corporation
- Owners: Florence C. Hall, Wiley Post
- Registration: NR105W

History
- Manufactured: 1930
- Preserved at: Smithsonian Institution displayed at the National Air and Space Museum

The Winnie Mae is a modified Lockheed 5C Vega flown by Wiley Post during the 1930 National Air Races, winning first place with a time of 9 hours, 9 minutes, and 4 seconds, as well as setting records for the fastest around-the-world flight in 1931, with a time of 8 days, 15 hours, and 51 minutes, the first solo around-the-world flight in 1933, and the flight altitude record in 1934, reaching 50,000 feet. The Winnie Mae was sold to the Smithsonian Institution after Wiley Post's death, where it is currently being displayed at the National Air and Space Museum in Chantilly, Virginia.

== History ==
The Winnie Mae was built in 1930 by the Lockheed Corporation in Burbank, California, with the serial number 122 as a Lockheed 5B model. In June 1930, Florence C. Hall, an oil baron based in Chickasha, Oklahoma, purchased the Winnie Mae for $22,000 and named it after his daughter. The plane had been intended for personal use and Hall's personal pilot, Wiley Post, would pilot the aircraft. On August 27th, 1930, with permission from Hall, Wiley Post entered the Winnie Mae in the National Air Races. Winning first place in the men's non-stop cross-country derby securing a cash prize of $7,500 and setting a record time of 9 hours, 9 minutes, and 4 seconds; an achievement which was painted on the plane's fuselage.

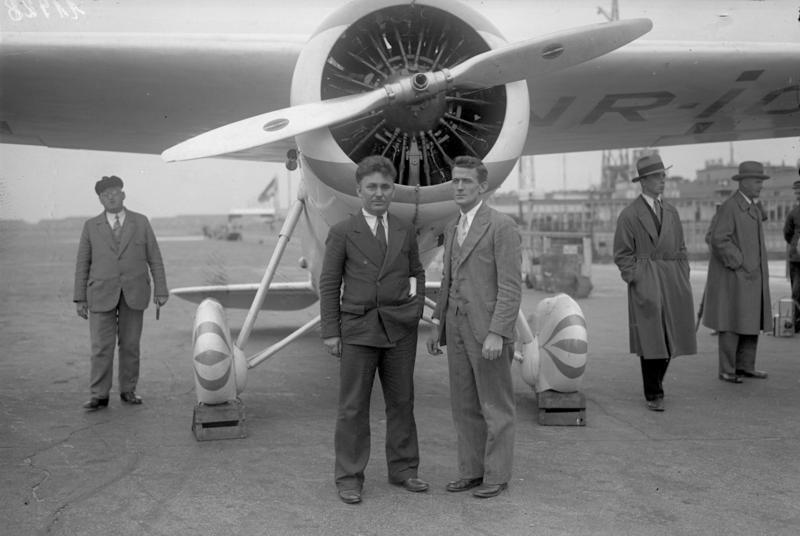
Wiley Post with Harold Gatty in front of the Winnie Mae in Germany, 1931

On June 23, 1931, Wiley Post along with Australian aviator Harold Gatty acting as navigator departed New York in an attempt to beat the record for the fastest around-the-world flight. After 14 refueling stops they landed back in New York on July 1, 1931, having completed the circuit in 8 days, 15 hours, and 51 minutes. Being the first to complete an around-the-world flight in a fixed-wing aircraft and beating Hugo Eckener's previous record of 21 days, 5 hours, and 31 minutes in a Zeppelin. After completing the flight, Wiley Post acquired Winnie Mae from Florence C. Hall. On July 8th, 1931, Wiley Post competed in the National Air Races again with the Winnie Mae, being beaten by Jimmy Dolittle in a Laird Super Solution.

In 1932, Wiley Post converted the Winnie Mae from a Lockheed 5B to a Lockheed 5C model and installed various other modifications. Its Wasp C engine was upgraded with cylinders from a Wasp C1, increasing the horsepower from 420 to 500. Its fixed-pitch propeller was upgraded to a Smith 450-SI variable-pitch propeller, and the wing's angle of incidence was decreased by 10 degrees to increase the plane's airspeed by approximately 10 MPH (16 KPH). In 1933, Wiley Post installed a Sperry gyroscopic autopilot, a fairly new invention at the time, and added six auxiliary fuel tanks in preparation for his solo around-the-world flight, giving the Winnie Mae a fuel capacity of 645 gallons.

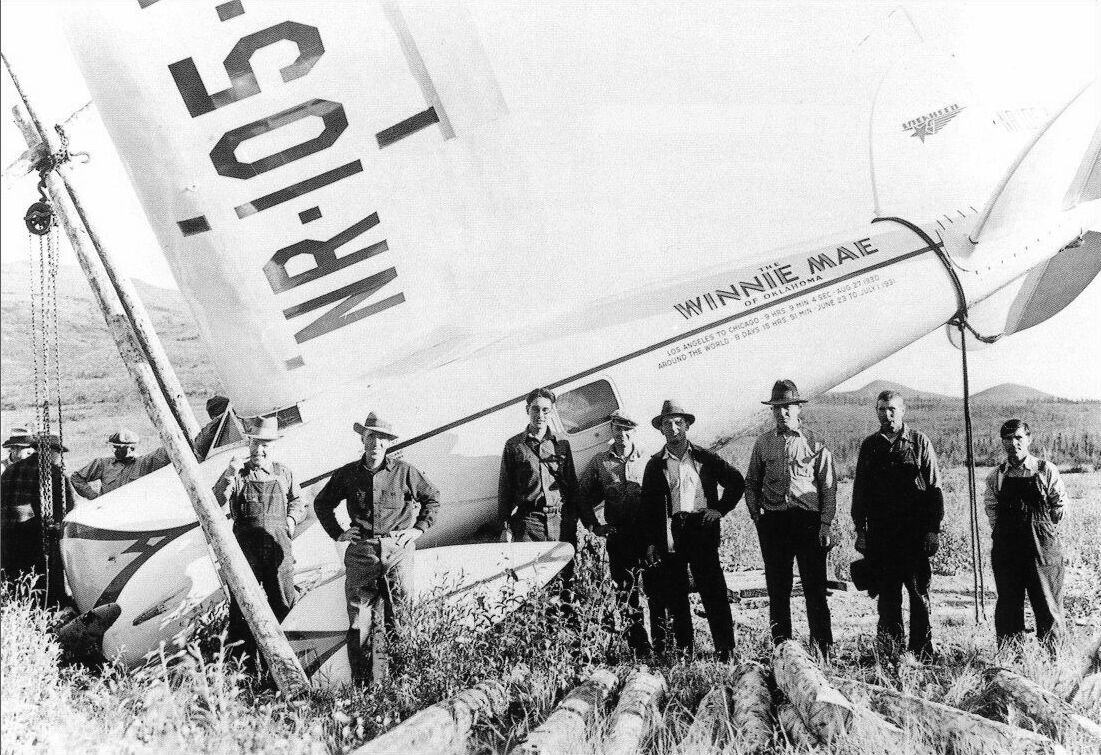
Winnie Mae after crash landing near Flat, Alaska, July 20th, 1933

On July 15, 1933, Wiley Post departed Floyd Bennett Airfield, New York, in the Winnie Mae on what would become the first solo around-the-world flight. At 11:58 A.M. (AKST) on July 20, 1933, after a 3,000-mile leg from Khabarovsk, Siberia to Nome, Alaska, Post overflew his destination and got lost, crash-landing next to a U.S. Army Signal Corps radio station at Flat, Alaska after 7 hours of searching for an airfield. The aircraft's wheels sank into the soft ground causing the plane to nose over, damaging its propeller, engine cowling, and right landing gear strut. Replacement parts were flown in from Fairbanks, Alaska, and after repairs, the Winnie Mae departed Alaska the following day at 7:28 A.M. (AKST). Post completed his record-breaking solo around-the-world flight in 7 days, 18 hours, and 49 minutes, stopping 11 times for fuel. When the Winnie Mae landed back in New York on July 22, over 50,000 spectators gathered to catch a glimpse of Wiley Post and his now-famous aircraft.

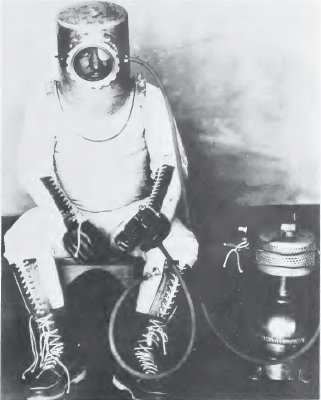
Wiley Post's pressure suit

In early 1934, Wiley Post started modifying the Winnie Mae for high-altitude long-distance flights, supercharging the engine and adding jettisonable landing gear as well as a skid to land on, this design was chosen to reduce drag on the aircraft. The Winnie Mae could not be pressurized due to its wooden construction, so Post had a full-body pressure suit made with financial support from the Phillips Petroleum Company. On December 7, 1934, Post flew the Winnie Mae to an estimated fifty thousand feet above Bartlesville, Oklahoma, unofficially setting the flight altitude record for a fixed-wing aircraft. Wiley Post understood that planes fly faster at higher altitudes, so he set out to beat the current cross-country speed record. After four failed attempts, Post settled for the Burbank, California, to Cleveland, Ohio, route, which he completed on March 15, 1935, covering the 2,035 miles in the stratosphere in 7 hours, 19 minutes at an impressive 340 MPH (547 KPH). For comparison, the Lockheed 5C Vega normally had a top speed of 185 MPH (298 KPH). The Winnie Mae was able to achieve its high speeds by flying in the jet stream, a fast-flowing atmospheric air current.

Wiley Post died in a plane crash on August 15, 1935, while flying a modified Lockheed Orion near Point Barrow, Alaska. Shortly after in 1936, Post's widow sold the Winnie Mae for $25,000 to the Smithsonian Institution, which still preserves it at the National Air and Space Museum in Washington, D.C.

== Specifications ==
Data from Lockheed Vega Winnie Mae | National Air and Space Museum

General characteristics

- Crew: 1
- Length: 27 ft 6 in (8.38 m)
- Wingspan: 41 ft (12 m)
- Height: 8 ft 2 in (2.49 m)
- Wing area: 275 sq ft (25.5 m^{2})
- Empty weight: 2,595 lb (1,177 kg)
- Gross weight: 4,500 lb (2,041 kg)
- Fuel capacity: 645 US gal (537 imp gal; 2,440 L)
- Propellers: 2-bladed Smith 450-SI variable-pitch propeller

Performance

- Maximum speed: 340 mph (550 km/h, 300 kn) at 55,000 ft. 185 mph (298 km/h, 161 kn) normally.
- Service ceiling: 50,000 ft (15,000 m) approximately

== See also ==
- List of preserved Lockheed aircraft
