= Flat, Alaska =

- CDP
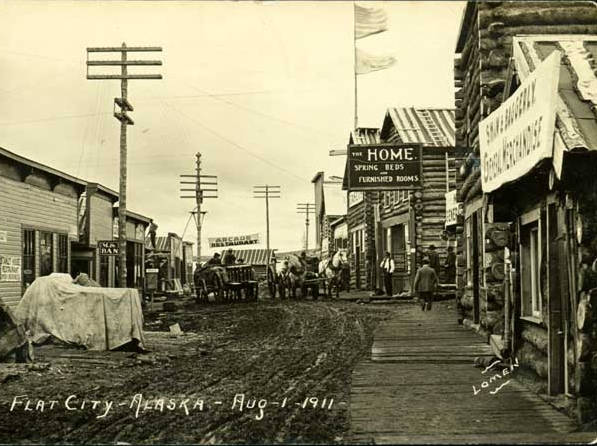
- Flat City, 1911

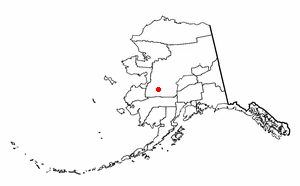
- Location of Flat, Alaska
- Coordinates: 62°27′15″N 158°0′30″W
- Country: United States
- State: Alaska
- Census Area: Yukon-Koyukuk

Government
  - State senator: Click Bishop (R)
  - State rep.: Mike Cronk (R)

Area
  - Total: 160.27 sq mi (415.09 km^{2})
  - Land: 160.27 sq mi (415.09 km^{2})
  - Water: 0 sq mi (0.00 km^{2})
- Elevation: 292 ft (89 m)

Population (2020)
  - Total: 0
  - Density: 0/sq mi (0/km^{2})
- Time zone: UTC-9 (Alaska (AKST))
  - Summer (DST): UTC-8 (AKDT)
- ZIP code: 99584
- Area code: 907
- FIPS code: 02-25880
- GNIS feature ID: 1402165

Flat is a census-designated place (CDP) in Yukon-Koyukuk Census Area, Alaska, United States. As of the 2020 census, Flat had a population of 0. Its post office closed in January 2004. Few buildings are inhabitable with hundreds of collapsed ruins.

== History ==
Prospectors John Beaton and W.A. Dikeman discovered gold on Otter Creek on December 25, 1908. News of the discovery spread slowly, but some miners arrived in the summer of 1909 and built a small camp they called Flat City. More gold was discovered on nearby Flat Creek and more miners arrived in 1910. Beaton, Peter Miscovich, Lars Ostnes, and David Strandberg were prominent early arrivals who mined successfully long after the initial boomtown faded. By 1914, the community had grown to about 6,000 people, complete with an elementary school, a telephone system, two stores, a hotel, restaurant, pool hall, laundry and jail. However, a fire in 1924 caused the majority of the town to burn. By 1930, the population had declined to 124. No plat was filed for Flat, and the town site rests on mining claims, so the existence of Flat may contravene the law, but the U.S. Post Office acknowledged the community and served its few residents with an office until the year 2000.

Between 1986 and 2000, the primary year-round residents were a family of five who worked together to maintain the area in the winter for mining in the summer.

=== Wiley Post 1933 airplane crash ===
In July 1933, pioneering aviator Wiley Post undertook the first solo flight around the world. On July 20, en route to Fairbanks from a stop in Khabarovsk, Siberia, Post nosed over his high-wing, single-engine Lockheed Vega, the Winnie Mae, in Flat. Local residents helped him right the aircraft. The only damage was a broken propeller. A replacement propeller was brought to Flat by pioneer Alaska flier Joe Crosson and the airplane was repaired by John Miscovich. Post continued to Fairbanks, then on to Edmonton and New York, completing his solo flight around the world in under 8 days. 50 years later, Miscovich constructed a monument to commemorate Post's first solo flight around the world.

== Geography ==
Flat is located at 62°27′15″N 158°0′30″W (62.454135, -158.008284), 7 miles southeast of Iditarod.

According to the United States Census Bureau, the CDP has a total area of 161.1 square miles (417 km^{2}), all of which of is land and none of it is covered by water.

=== Climate ===
Climate data for Flat, Alaska
Month	Jan	Feb	Mar	Apr	May	Jun	Jul	Aug	Sep	Oct	Nov	Dec	Year
Record high °F (°C)	53 (12)	57 (14)	59 (15)	69 (21)	85 (29)	88 (31)	86 (30)	84 (29)	75 (24)	67 (19)	56 (13)	51 (11)	88 (31)
Mean daily maximum °F (°C)	24 (−4)	27 (−3)	33 (1)	42 (6)	54 (12)	61 (16)	64 (18)	63 (17)	56 (13)	41 (5)	31 (−1)	26 (−3)	44 (6)
Mean daily minimum °F (°C)	9 (−13)	11 (−12)	16 (−9)	25 (−4)	35 (2)	42 (6)	47 (8)	47 (8)	40 (4)	26 (−3)	15 (−9)	11 (−12)	27 (−3)
Record low °F (°C)	−48 (−44)	−43 (−42)	−42 (−41)	−19 (−28)	4 (−16)	27 (−3)	33 (1)	25 (−4)	15 (−9)	−12 (−24)	−28 (−33)	−38 (−39)	−48 (−44)
Average precipitation inches (mm)	1.0 (25)	0.8 (20)	0.7 (18)	1.0 (25)	1.3 (33)	1.6 (41)	2.3 (58)	3.0 (76)	3.2 (81)	2.1 (53)	1.4 (36)	1.2 (30)	19.6 (496)
Source: weather.com

== Demographics ==
Historical population
Year	Pop.	±%
1914	6,000	—
1920	158	−97.4%
1930	124	−21.5%
1940	146	+17.7%
1950	95	−34.9%
1960	27	−71.6%
1986	5	−81.5%
2000	4	−20.0%
2020	0	−100.0%
Source: and United States Census Bureau

Flat first appeared on the 1920 U.S. Census as an unincorporated village. It would continue to appear until 1960. It did not appear again until 2000 when it was made a census designated place (CDP) with its boundaries including the former city of Iditarod and the former mining village of Otter. As of 2010, it has no residents.

- Note that the population of 6,000 for 1914 during its peak year is speculative and not an official count by the U.S. Census Bureau.

=== 2000 census ===
As of the census of 2000, there were 4 people in 1 household (a married couple with children, in this case) and in 1 family residing in the town. The population density was 0.0 inhabitants per square mile (0/km^{2}). There were 3 housing units at an average density of 0.0 per square mile (0/km^{2}). The racial makeup of the CDP was all white.

In the CDP, the population was evenly spread out over the age categories under-18, 18 to 24, 25 to 44 and from 45 to 64. The median age was 33 years. There were as many males as there were females, but apparently the only person below 18 was a girl.

=== 2010 census ===
The 2010 census, reported a population of 0.

== See also ==
- Iditarod, Alaska, the former river port for Flat
- John Miscovich, the "mayor of Flat", whose family acquired the claims of departing miners, eventually owning 1,400 acres of Otter Valley.
