= Cheporor =

Village in Kenya

Coordinates: 1°18′52″N 34°53′50″E

- Village
- Country: Kenya
- County: West Pokot County
- Area: Kanyarkwat

Cheporor is a village in Kanyarkwat, West Pokot County, Kenya.

In August 2026, the village attracted worldwide attention after three young herders reportedly discovered gold deposits, triggering a gold rush that brought an estimated 10,000 people from across Kenya and neighbouring Uganda within several days. The rapid influx has placed pressure on water, sanitation and security, while authorities have warned of dangerous informal mining conditions and risks to children working at the site.
