= Harold Gatty =

Australian aviation record holder (1892–1973)

Harold Charles Gatty
- Wiley Post and Gatty in July 1931 at Boston Airport
- Born: 5 January 1903; Campbell Town, Tasmania
- Died: 30 August 1957 (aged 54); Fiji
- Occupation: navigator
- Known for: Wiley Post's navigator on circumnavigation flight (1931)

Harold Charles Gatty (5 January 1903 – 30 August 1957) was an Australian navigator and aviation pioneer. Charles Lindbergh called Gatty the "Prince of Navigators." In 1931, Gatty served as navigator, along with pilot Wiley Post, on the flight which set the record for aerial circumnavigation of the world, flying a distance of 15,747 miles (24,903 km) in a Lockheed Vega named the Winnie Mae, in 8 days, 15 hours and 51 minutes.

== Early career ==
Gatty was born on 5 January 1903 in Campbell Town, Tasmania.

He began his career as a navigator at the age of 14, on 1 January 1917, when he was appointed a midshipman at the Royal Australian Naval College at Jervis Bay. Ironically, in light of his later prominence in the field, Gatty struggled to pass his courses in navigation.

Gatty withdrew from the Naval College in May 1920 to join the Australian merchant navy. For three years he was an apprentice ship's officer with the Patrick Steamship Company of Sydney. He served on many ships, some sailing between Australia and California. As a result of standing night watch, Gatty became an expert in celestial navigation.

For a time he worked in the provisioning of merchant vessels in Sydney Harbour.

In 1927, Gatty relocated to California, where he opened a navigation school, teaching marine navigation to yachtsmen. In 1928, his attention turned to air navigation.

== Aeronautical navigator ==
In 1929, Gatty navigated a Lockheed Vega on a flight from Los Angeles to New York City for Nevada Airlines, in an effort to demonstrate the feasibility of coast-to-coast passenger service. The flight made four stops and took 19 hours and 53 minutes, which set the transcontinental airspeed record for a commercial airliner.

In 1930, Gatty prepared a coast-to-coast route and navigation charts for Anne Morrow Lindbergh, who he had taught as a student. Anne Lindbergh served as navigator with her husband Charles on a record-setting cross-country flight of 14 hours and 45 minutes.

In 1931, Wiley Post asked Gatty to accompany him on an effort to break the world record for circumnavigating the Earth, which was previously set at 21 days by the Graf Zeppelin airship. Gatty accepted, hoping to demonstrate the effectiveness of his navigation methods. The journey began on 23 June 1931 at Roosevelt Field in New York and followed a 15,000-mile course across Europe, Russia, and Siberia, due to the lack of suitable airfields nearer the equator.

Post and Gatty crossed the Atlantic, from Harbour Grace to Flintshire, in a record time of 16 hours and 17 minutes. They continued to Berlin, Moscow, and Khabarovsk, then crossed the Bering Sea, landing on the beach near Solomon, Alaska, then to Edmonton, Alberta, arriving back at Roosevelt Field after 8 days, 15 hours, and 51 minutes.

The pair received a Ticker tape parade in New York City. Along "The Canyon of Heroes" in New York City are thermal granite pavers on Broadway, marking the 204 Ticker Tape Parades. No. 38 states "Wiley Post and Harold Gatty for their flight around the World/ Eight days, 15 hours, 51 minutes."

Air navigation in Gatty's time used dead reckoning. When setting out for a destination the aircraft heading is taken with respect to a compass. Motion over the Earth is determined by the wind triangle. Heading must therefore be compensated for wind speed as well as drift rate. In 1931 Popular Mechanics published an article featuring Gatty's method for computing the wind drift experienced by an aircraft:

Gatty's invention consists of an endless film cut across by fine parallel lines. This strip of film moves at a speed synchronous with that of the plane over the Earth. The navigator looks through a periscope and makes his observations of the ground. He found the device quite satisfactory, but intends to define it further.

The article lauded the artificial horizon and turn and bank indicator that Post and Gatty used, which was developed by Lawrence Sperry and manufactured by the Sperry Gyroscope Company.

Later in 1931, Wiley Post and Harold Gatty co-wrote a complete and detailed account of their record setting circumnavigation. Around the World in Eight Days, The Flight of the Winnie Mae. described their preparations for the flight, and each leg of the journey. Map endpapers were included. In this book, Gatty gave a detailed account of a method of dead reckoning he invented that revolutionized the ability of navigators to fly safely through cloudy conditions, without drifting off course through cumulative errors.

"I prepared a special drift-and-speed indicator for the flight around the world in which only one known factor was required, namely, the altitude above the object sighted...The instrument is somewhat similar in appearance to a microscope. In construction, it is similar to the projection outlet of a motion-picture machine. The eyepiece can be moved closer to or farther from the spectrum through which a film moves at a constant speed, governed by clockwork.
The procedure for making observations through the indicator is as follows. We estimate, or fly down and measure upward, our exact altitude from a spot on the surface of the earth. When aloft, I focus the eyepiece on it and start the clockwork going. There will be a difference in the apparent speed of the film and the rate at which the spot is passing across the spectrum, so the eyepiece is moved until both speeds are apparently equal. A table which I have prepared to go with the instrument shows the ground speed for the two known factors of the observation: the distance of the eyepiece from the film, and the altitude of the instrument from the object sighted.
For drift, the operation is simultaneous with that for calculating speed...
If we can get continual observations, our course can be accurately determined. But when clouds obscure the sky, no observations can be made. Then it is that the navigator resorts to "dead reckoning".

Wiley Post installed two hatches on the Winnie Mae for Gatty to use, one overhead and just forward from his seat behind the fuel tanks, and the other on the bottom of the cabin. Through the first, he was to observe the stars, and through the bottom hatch was to use his special drift- and -speed indicator. Gatty observed

"With those two "eyes" the Winnie Mae could find her way anywhere if the laws which regulate the universe of ours are held constant for the duration of the flight."

Within the feature in Popular Mechanics magazine of their flight, there is a diagrammatic sketch that shows the workings of Gatty's dead reckoning indicator, that, along with the skills of pilot Wiley Post, enabled them to set a new record of eight days for circumnavigating the world. The location of the large fuel tank meant they could not see each other whilst in flight. They communicated through written notes that were passed over the fuel tank by a pulley system. In Around the World in Eight Days Post says they used a speaking tube which Gatty introduced.

A year after the circumnavigation with Wiley Post, the US Congress passed a bill allowing civilians to receive the Distinguished Flying Cross. President Hoover presented the medals to Gatty and Post at the White House on August 18, 1932. Gatty was offered American citizenship and the newly created position of Senior Aerial Navigation Engineer for the US Army Air Corps. Gatty expressed his wish to remain associated with Australia and Congress passed a bill allowing foreign citizens to hold that post.

In 1934, Gatty formed the South Seas Commercial Company with Donald Douglas, with the plan to deliver air service to the islands of the South Pacific. The company was soon sold to Pan Am, who brought Gatty into the company to organise flight routes in that region.

== Pan Am and the Kinkajou Expedition ==
In May 1935 Gatty was hired by Pan Am founder Juan Trippe as Pan Am's representative in the Australasian area to assist in developing its Pacific operation, specifically the mapping of the San Francisco-China mid-Pacific air route and developing potential island stopovers. After obtaining leave from his military service as navigation instructor for the US Army, Gatty joined the leader of the expedition, Dr. Francis D. Coman, on the schooner Kinkajou.

In November 1935, Noonan and Gatty embarked in the schooner Kinkajou to investigate Baker, Howland, and Jarvis islands and conduct meteorological observations. During this voyage, Gatty and the crew of the Kinkajou were marooned briefly on Baker Island, and saved themselves from starvation by Gatty's extensive knowledge of sea bird habits.

== World War II ==
During the Second World War, Gatty was given the honorary rank of group captain in the Royal Australian Air Force (RAAF), and worked for the US Army Air Forces (USAAF) in the South Pacific. He was later appointed director of Air Transport for the Allied forces, based in Australia, under General Douglas MacArthur. Gatty moved to Washington, D.C. in 1943 where he worked on a navigational supplement for a survival kit, for Air Force personnel flying over the Pacific in the event they should become castaways.

Gatty produced The Raft Book: Lore of the Sea and Sky to fill the need:

Supplemented by a foldout table for navigation computations, folded paper scales for measuring distances, and a unique worldwide chart, The Raft Book demonstrates the usefulness of the Polynesian star-based passage-making technique.
[Polynesians] viewed the stars as moving bands of light, and knew all of the stars of each band which passed over the islands they were interested in.
Their method of navigation by these heavenly beacons was to sail toward the star which they knew was over their destination at that particular time.
Gatty found the lore of birds especially useful for castaways.

The Raft Book came under criticism from Alain Bombard that the appearance of frigatebirds did not mean land was within 100 miles as stated in the book. The voyage and complaint of Bombard was recounted in 1966 by Francis Chichester, who also wrote, “It was a fine book which gave hope to many thousands of people who were on the ocean in small boats after being torpedoed or shot down, and he gave heart to many more people who had to face the possibility of a predicament. But he did make one or two mistakes like this one about the Frigate Birds.”

== Later career ==
After World War II, Gatty relocated to Fiji with his Dutch-born second wife. There he formed Fiji Airways which later became Air Pacific. In 2013, the company name was changed back to Fiji Airways. He was appointed to the Legislative Council in 1950, as one of two nominated European members, and served for two years.

A few days after completing his last book manuscript, Gatty suffered a stroke and died in August 1957. He was buried in Fiji.

In 1958, Gatty's completed manuscript on natural and primitive navigation techniques, Nature Is Your Guide: How To Find Your Way on Land and Sea by Observing Nature was published. Expanding upon the ideas of The Raft Book, Gatty developed a narrative of Pacific settlement by Polynesian navigators following migration of seabirds. He attributed cultural significance to the use of the pelorus by ancient Polynesians.

Gatty's 1958 book was later republished and re-titled Finding Your Way Without Map or Compass. Gatty's original August 1957 preface to his manuscript clearly states that environmental pathfinding observations were only intended to supplement, never supplant the use of map and compass.
