= Mišovice =

- Municipality
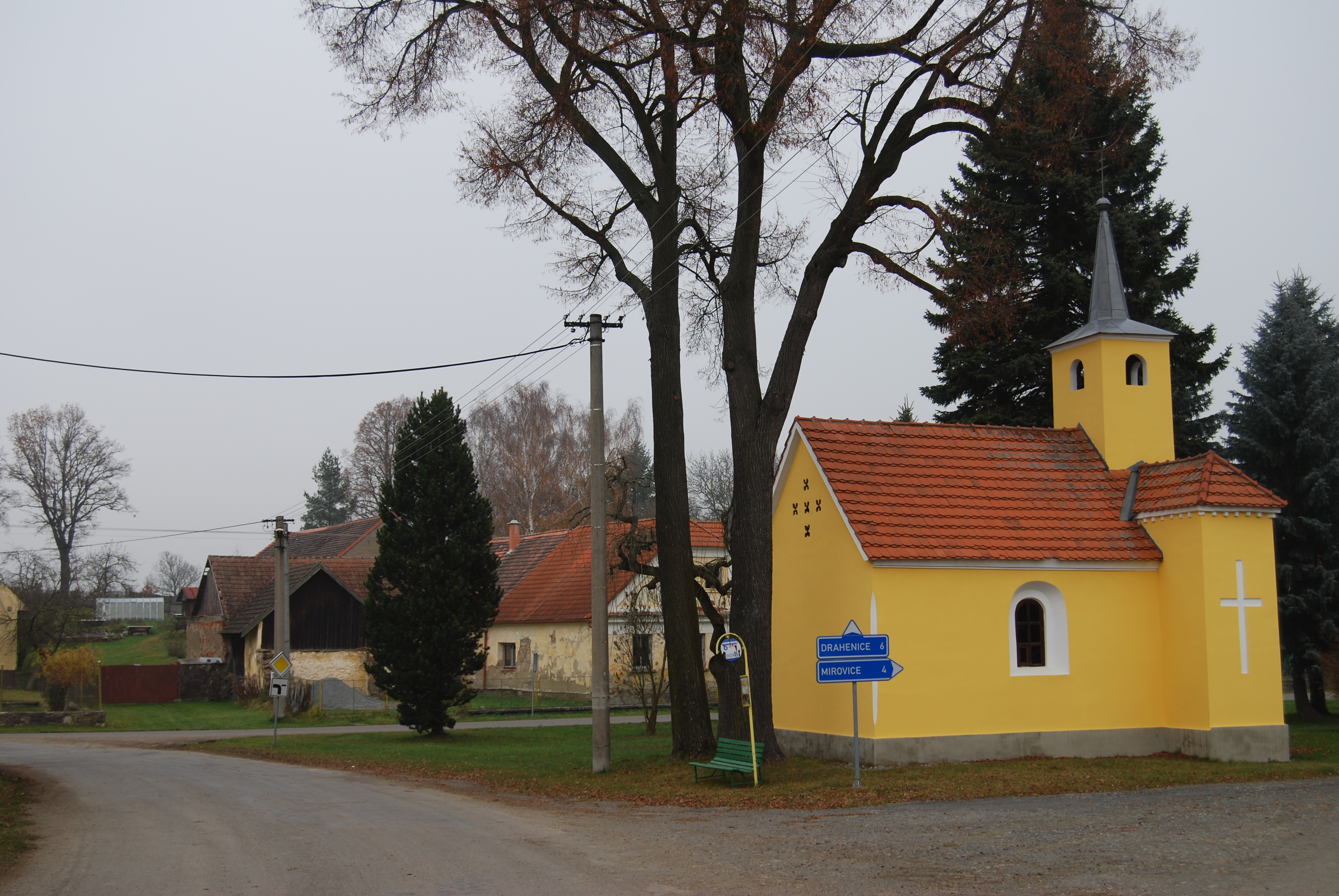
- Chapel in the centre of Mišovice

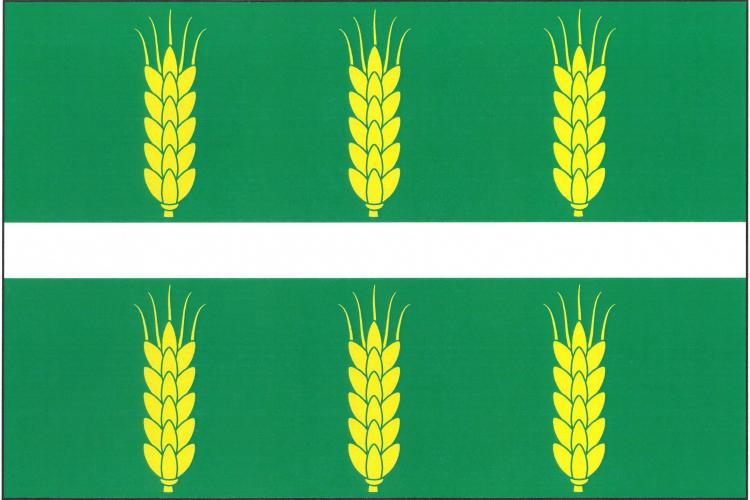
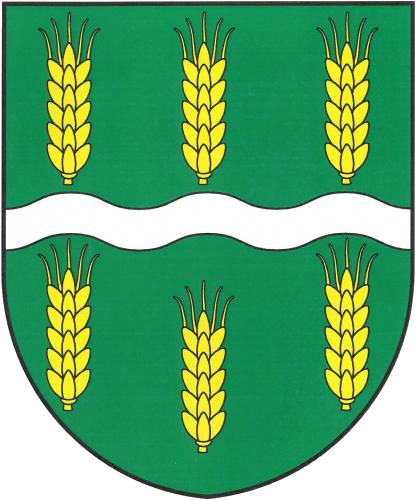
- Flag Coat of arms

- Location in the Czech Republic
- Coordinates: 49°29′43″N 14°0′18″E
- Country: Czech Republic
- Region: South Bohemian
- District: Písek
- First mentioned: 1323

Area
  - Total: 14.82 km^{2} (5.72 sq mi)
- Elevation: 461 m (1,512 ft)

Population (2026-01-01)
  - Total: 250
  - Density: 17/km^{2} (44/sq mi)
- Time zone: UTC+1 (CET)
  - Summer (DST): UTC+2 (CEST)
- Postal code: 398 04
- Website: www.misovice.cz

Mišovice is a municipality and village in Písek District in the South Bohemian Region of the Czech Republic. It has about 300 inhabitants.

Mišovice lies approximately 24 kilometres (15 mi) north-west of Písek, 68 km (42 mi) north-west of České Budějovice, and 73 km (45 mi) south-west of Prague.

== Administrative division ==
Mišovice consists of five municipal parts (in brackets population according to the 2021 census):

- Mišovice (35)
- Draheničky (15)
- Pohoří (59)
- Slavkovice (39)
- Svučice (89)

== Demographics ==
Historical population
Year	Pop.	±%
1869	1,111	—
1880	1,126	+1.4%
1890	1,005	−10.7%
1900	998	−0.7%
1910	1,009	+1.1%
1921	982	−2.7%
1930	937	−4.6%
1950	676	−27.9%
1961	570	−15.7%
1970	430	−24.6%
1980	348	−19.1%
1991	284	−18.4%
2001	254	−10.6%
2011	193	−24.0%
2021	237	+22.8%
Source: Censuses
