= Iditarod, Alaska =

Ghost town in the State of Alaska, United States

Iditarod
- Ghost town
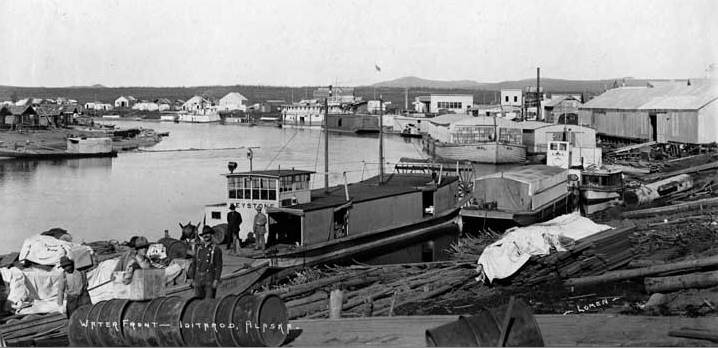
- Port of Iditarod, around 1911

- Location within the state of Alaska
- Coordinates: 62°32′40″N 158°05′43″W
- Country: United States
- State: Alaska
- Census area: Yukon-Koyukuk

Government
  - State senator: Lyman Hoffman (D)
  - State rep.: Bryce Edgmon (D)

Population (2000)
  - Total: 0
- Time zone: UTC-9 (Alaska (AKST))
  - Summer (DST): UTC-8 (AKDT)

Iditarod is an abandoned town in the Yukon-Koyukuk Census Area in the U.S. state of Alaska. It is presently located within the boundaries of the Flat Census Designated Place, which has no residents as of 2000.

== History ==
The town of Iditarod was named after the Iditarod River. Iditarod comes from the Athabascan word Haidilatna, meaning distant or distant place.

On Christmas Day 1908, prospectors John Beaton and W.A. "Bill" Dikeman found gold on Otter Creek, a tributary to the Iditarod River. News of the find spread, and in the summer of 1909 miners arrived in the gold fields and built a small camp that was later known as Flat. People and supplies traveled to the gold fields by boat from the Yukon River, up the Innoko River, and up the Iditarod River to the current town site, a short walk from Flat.

More gold was discovered, and a massive stampede headed for Flat in 1910. The steamboat Tanana arrived June 1, 1910, and the city of Iditarod was founded as a head of navigation for all the surrounding gold fields, including Flat, Discovery, Otter, Dikeman, and Willow Creek. Iditarod quickly became a bustling boomtown, with hotels, cafés, brothels, clothing stores, three newspapers (only one would last the year), a Miners and Merchants Bank, a mercantile store, electricity, telephones, automobiles, and a light railway to Flat.

By 1930 the gold was gone and most of the miners had moved to Flat, taking many of the buildings with them. Iditarod is now a ghost town. Only one cabin and a handful of ruins remain, including the concrete bank vault from the Miners and Merchants Bank.

== Demographics ==
Historical population
| Census | Pop. | Note | %± |
|---|---|---|---|
| 1920 | 50 | | — |
| 1930 | 8 | | −84.0% |
| 1940 | 1 | | −87.5% |
| 2000 | 0 | | — |

Iditarod first appeared on the 1920 U.S. census as an incorporated city of just 50 residents, as the boom had already played out. In 1930, it was unincorporated, leaving just a single resident by 1940. It did not report again on the census after that. However, the area was included in the census designated place of Flat beginning in 2000, but with the departure of their remaining residents, the population is now back to 0.
