= Zdravko Krstanović =

Serbian poet and journalist (1950–2024)

- Здравко Крстановић
- Born: 30 July 1950; Siverić, PR Croatia, FPR Yugoslavia
- Died: 2 September 2024 (aged 74)
- Education: Faculty of Philosophy in Zagreb
- Occupation(s): Literature, folklore, journalism

Zdravko Krstanović (Serbian Cyrillic: Здравко Крстановић; 30 July 1950 – 2 September 2024) was a Serbian poet, prose writer, critic, book editor, literature historian, playwright and journalist.

== Biography ==
Krstanović attended high school in Knin and Split. He graduated from the Yugoslav languages and literature and Comparative literature at the Faculty of Philosophy in Zagreb. Until October 1991 he lived in Split, Croatia, and since then lived in Belgrade, Serbia.

He was an editor at the "Logos" publishing house in Split, had a column "Records from Insomnia /Zapisi iz nesanice/" and regular book reviews in Split newspaper Slobodna Dalmacija, as well as in the Zagreb magazine Oko. From 1990 to 1993 he edited the magazine Srpska zora. From 1990 to 2002 he was a journalist in the Belgrade newspaper Politika Ekspres.

Krstanović published his first poem in 1962 in Sarajevo children's magazine Vesela sveska, and his first story in 1971 in Zagreb newspaper Večernji List.

As an elementary school pupil he contributed in Male novine, Kekec, Plavi vjesnik, Galeb, Borba, Ilustrovana politika, Slobodna Dalmacija and other periodicals.

In high school he published in Polet and Vidik. As a student, he collaborated with the Serbian cultural society "Prosvjeta" and published a number of literary articles in the journal Prosvjeta and the journal Novi ljetopis.

He published poetry and stories in Republika, Književne novine, Politika, NIN, Start, Forum, Pitanja, Savremenik, Polja, Letopis Matice srpske, Mogućnosti, Oslobođenje, Odjek, Stvaranje, Stremljenje, Srpski književni glasnik, Ovdje, Revija and many other periodicals.

Krstanović was also a prolific ethnographer of Serbian folklore heritage.

Krstanović died on 2 September 2024, at the age of 74.

== Works ==
Krstanović was the author of numerous poems and articles, as well as monodrama The man on the world, a drop on the leaf /Čovek na svitu, kap na listu/ in two versions (1979 and 1980), TV drama The old man /Starac/ (1983) and a screenplay for the short film Paradise Garden /Rajski vrt/ (1990).

He edited Libar by Miljenko Smoje (1981), Erotic folk songs / Erotske narodne pjesme/ (1984), an anthology of Serbian folk poetry The golden foam from the sea /Zlatna pjena od mora/ (1990), Dubrovnik's elegies /Dubrovačke elegije/ by Lujo Vojnović (1997), The Feast /Gozba/ by Pavle Solarić (1999) and A wonderful fountain – An anthology of Serbian poetry from Baranja to Boka Kotorska (2002).

His book Tales from Hades /Priče iz Hada/ has been translated into several languages, from 1992 to 2000, and had twelve editions.

=== Poetry books ===
- Principality of fish /Kneževina riba/ (1974)
- House /Kuća / (1978)
- Water syllables /Slogovi od vode/ (1981)
- Dynamite /Dinamit/ (1982)
- Reverse master /Obrnuti majstor/ (1984)
- Other mountains /Druge planine/ (1989)
- Songs on the road /Pjesme na drumu/ (1994)
- Selected poems /Izabrane pesme/ (1995)
- Jesus Christ in the field /Isus Hrist u polju/ (1996)
- The dew manuscript /Rukopis iz rose/ (1997)
- Soon, a daybreak /Uskoro, sviće/ (1998)
- Room without a mirror /Soba bez ogledala/ (2000)
- Selected poems /Izabrane pjesme/ (2008)

=== Collections of lyrical prose ===
- The book made of dream and wake /Knjiga od sna i jave/ (1998)
- Chopin's water /Šopenova voda/ (2003)

== Prizes and awards ==
Krstanović was represented in numerous literary anthologies and collections, and translated into ten languages.

He won several literary awards and received the "Filip Višnjić" Award for "the extraordinary contribution to the culture of the Serbian people" in 2002.

== Literature ==
- Jovanović, Aleksandar. Narrating horror /Pripovedanje užasa/" in: Tales from Hades /Priče iz Hada/], 1994. (Serbian)

== External sources ==
- Krstanović, Zdravko. Tales from Hades /Priče iz Hada/, 1994. (Serbian)
- The golden foam from the sea — An anthology of folk poetry of Serbs of Croatia /Zlatna pjena od mora — Narodne pjesme Srba u Hrvatskoj/, 1990. (Serbian)
- Krstanović, Zdravko. The divine flow of anciently young letter /Božansko strujanje drevno mladog slova/ (Serbian)
- Solarić, Pavle. (1779–1821): The feast /Gozba/ (Serbian)
