= Joanne Pierce Misko =

American FBI agent (1941–2024)

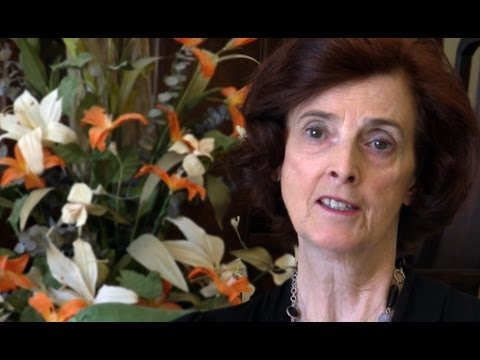
- Misko in 2012
- Born: Joanne Eileen Pierce; January 7, 1941; Niagara Falls, New York, U.S.
- Died: December 13, 2024 (aged 83); Wheatfield, New York, U.S.
- Occupations: Nun, FBI agent

Joanne Pierce Misko (January 7, 1941 – December 13, 2024) was an American nun and FBI special agent who, in 1972, was one of the first women to join the FBI as an agent.

== Background ==
Joanne Eileen Pierce was born in Niagara Falls, New York, to homemaker Ann (Egan) Pierce and Howard Pierce, who worked at a chemical company. Pierce grew up in Niagara Falls, and attended the local Catholic high school.

Pierce joined the Sisters of Mercy in Buffalo, New York, in 1960, remaining with them for 10 years. While a sister, she earned a bachelor's degree in social science education from Medaille College in 1965, and in 1970 completed a master's degree in history from St. Bonaventure University prior to becoming an FBI agent. She worked as an educator throughout the decade, teaching history in high schools in Niagara Falls and Orleans County.

Misko died of a lung infection in Wheatfield, New York, on December 13, 2024, at the age of 83.

== FBI career ==
Pierce became interested in a job at the FBI after a recruiter visited Mount Mercy Academy, the Catholic school in South Buffalo where she was teaching. Pierce had already been considering leaving, as she was interested in getting married and having children.

In 1970, Pierce moved to Washington, D.C. and joined the FBI in 1970 as a researcher, one of few jobs in the organization open to women at the time. In May 1972, FBI interim director L. Patrick Gray III changed policy, allowing women to become agents. Pierce applied, and she and Susan Roley Malone became the organization's first female agents after they underwent a 14-week training program at the FBI Academy in Quantico, Virginia, finishing in October 1972. During training, the two women became known as "the Nun" and "the Marine".

Pierce's first posting as an agent was in St. Louis, Missouri, where she focused on white-collar crimes. In early 1973, she acted in the FBI response in a tribal war of the Wounded Knee Occupation on the Pine Ridge Indian Reservation in South Dakota. In the late 1970s, Pierce became "one of the first female supervisors at FBI Headquarters," working in the unit processing agent applications. She later worked in Pittsburgh, Pennsylvania, "where she pursued fugitives and military deserters". There, she met fellow agent Michael Misko (d. 2021), whom she married in 1981.

After retiring from the FBI in 1994, she worked as an audit investigator in a bank. At the time of her retirement, she had been "the longest-tenured female agent in FBI history".

Misko said that she generally faced little resistance within the FBI for her gender, although in 1994, she filed a lawsuit against the Department of Justice, asserting that she had not been promoted due to her gender. The suit was settled in 1996. On the job, Misko said she could use her gender to her advantage, as many suspects did not think she could be an agent.

== Awards and recognition ==
- 1995 Lifetime Law Enforcement Achievement Award, American Police Hall of Fame
