= Peter Miscovich =

Croatian-born American inventor

Peter Miscovich

Peter Miscovich (Petar Mišković/Pero Mišković) (1885–1950) was a Croatian-born American inventor. He was born in the village of Imotica in the Austro-Hungarian Kingdom of Dalmatia in 1885 and died in Alaska in 1950.

His most well-known inventions were a steam-powered washing machine and improvement of steam bath. He had seven children with his wife Stane. His son John Miscovich invented the Intelligiant pump used on boats, fire vehicles and more. Peter was also involved with creating hydraulics machines.

== Biography ==
Miscovich went to America in 1903, leaving from Le Havre, France and arriving in New York City at age eighteen on 25 May. He and his relatives had no formal education, but he was apprenticed in Montana and California. After some time he decided to move from metal mines to coal mines for his health. He went to Wilkensen where other Croats worked. However, he found coal mines to be even less healthy. When he heard about the stampede in the Iditarod 1910, he went to Seattle and then to the mouth of the Yukon River, St. Michael.
