= Kanyarkwat =

- Interactive map of Kanyarkwat
- Coordinates: 1.2666°N 34.9166°E
- Country: Kenya
- County: West Pokot County
- Sub-county: West Pokot
- Elevation: 1,827 m (5,994 ft)

Kanyarkwat is a local administrative, community area and village in West Pokot County, Kenya. It is located in West Pokot Sub-count at an elevation of approximately 1,827 metres above sea level.

The Environment and Land Court of Kenya has referred to the Kanyarkwat Group Ranch and parcels of land identified as West Pokot/Kanyarkwat in proceedings concerning land in the area.

The main road is the C594 Kanyarkwat–Cheptumet Road.

Kanyarkwat is served by Kanyarkwat Health Centre, a Level 3 public health facility operated under the Kenya Ministry of Health. The facility is located in West Pokot Sub-county and Riwo Ward.

The village Cheporor within Kanyarkwat received worldwide media attention in August 2026 due to a gold rush.

== Education ==
Kanyarkwat Girls Senior School is a public girls' school located in West Pokot County.
