= Dejan Mišković (footballer) =

Croatian footballer

Personal information
- Full name: Dejan Mišković
- Date of birth: 27 October 1985 (age 41)
- Place of birth: Zagreb, Croatia
- Height: 1.78 m (5 ft 10 in)
- Position: Centre back

Team information
- Current team: NK Matija Gubec

Youth career
- Zagreb

Senior career*
Years	Team	Apps	(Gls)
2003–2007	Zagreb	14	(0)
2003–2004	→ Lučko (loan)		
2004	→ Vrapče (loan)		
2008	Polet Buševec	5	(0)
2008–2013	Vrapče	134	(2)
2013–2014	Kustošija		
2014	Savski Marof		
2015-	Matija Gubec		
- * Club domestic league appearances and goals as of 30 August 2013

Dejan Mišković (born 27 October 1985) is a Croatian football defender, currently playing for NK Matija Gubec.

== Career ==
Passing through the youth ranks of NK Zagreb, Mišković signed a professional contract with the club, aged 19, after loans to NK Lučko and NK Vrapče. The young defender found it hard to break through to the first team in the following seasons, used only occasionally and on other positions. He was released 3 years into his contract and, after a short spell at Polet Buševec, spent the following 4 1/2 seasons at the third-tier side NK Vrapče, before moving to NK Kustošija Zagreb in early 2013.
