= Josip Mišić (footballer, born 1986) =

Croatian footballer

Personal information
- Full name: Josip Mišić
- Date of birth: 14 July 1986 (age 40)
- Place of birth: , SR Croatia, SFR Yugoslavia
- Height: 1.78 m (5 ft 10 in)
- Position: Left-back

Team information
- Current team: Sloga Jaruge

Youth career
- NK Osijek

Senior career*
Years	Team	Apps	(Gls)
2004–2006	Osijek	25	(3)
2006	Bjelovar	11	(0)
2007–2008	Kamen Ingrad	8	(2)
2008–2009	Međimurje	24	(1)
2009	Universitatea Craiova	0	(0)
2010–2011	MV Croatia	15	(0)
2011-2013	Vinogradar	29	(1)
2013–2017	Đakovo Croatia		
2017–2020	Ratar		
2020-2021	Sloga Jaruge		
2022	Ratar		
2022-	Sloga Jaruge		

International career
2004	Croatia U-21	6	(0)
- * Club domestic league appearances and goals

Josip Mišić (born 14 July 1986 in SR Croatia) is a Croatian footballer currently playing for Sloga Jaruge.
