= John Miscovich =

American inventor and gold miner

John A. Miscovich
- Miscovich in Flat with the family's Caterpillar tractor during spring stripping, circa 1940
- Born: John A. Miscovich; 1918; Flat, Alaska
- Died: 2014 (aged 95–96); Orange, California
- Occupation: Inventor
- Known for: Intelligiant water cannon
- Father: Peter Miscovich

John A. Miscovich (1918–2014) was an American inventor and gold miner. He and his family owned about 1400 acres of mining claims around Flat, Alaska and were active placer gold miners there. Miscovich was known as the "mayor of Flat".

He was the son of Peter Miscovich, known for inventing the steam washing machine and upgrading steam bath.

In 1990, Miscovich received a Distinguished Service Award from the Alaska Miners Association. In 2012, Miscovich was inducted into the Alaska Mining Hall of Fame.

== Inventions ==
Miscovich's best known invention was the intelligiant, a water cannon used in fire-fighting and hydraulic gold mining.

He also filed a patent for a fire-fighting system for airport runways. The system is installed underground, and in case of fire it rises up and rotates both horizontally and vertically.

== General references ==
- "John Arthur Miscovich's Obituary on Daily News-Miner". Daily News-Miner.
- "Photos: John Miscovich, inventor of the Intelligiant". Alaska Dispatch News.
- "The Intelligiant: John Miskovich's rise from Alaskan gold miner to world renowned inventor". Mining Technology.
- "How the miner-inventor's Intelligiant water cannon impacted the mining industry and others - Image - Mining Technology". www.mining-technology.com.
