= Air Luxor =

Portuguese airline

IATA	ICAO	Call sign
LK	LXR	AIRLUXOR
- Founded: 1988
- Ceased operations: 2006
- Hubs: Portela Airport
- Headquarters: Lisbon, Portugal
- Key people: Vítor Pinto da Costa (President)
- Website: airluxor.com

Air Luxor was an airline based in Luxor Plaza in Lisbon, Portugal, operating a limited number of scheduled flights out of Portela Airport, Lisbon. The airline's operations were located in Building C1 and Hangar 7 in Delta Park, an area in Lisbon Airport.

== History ==
Air Luxor was founded in Lisbon, Portugal in 1988. It flew in and around Europe and operated until 2006. It operated a fleet of Airbus and Lockheed aircraft.

== Fleet ==
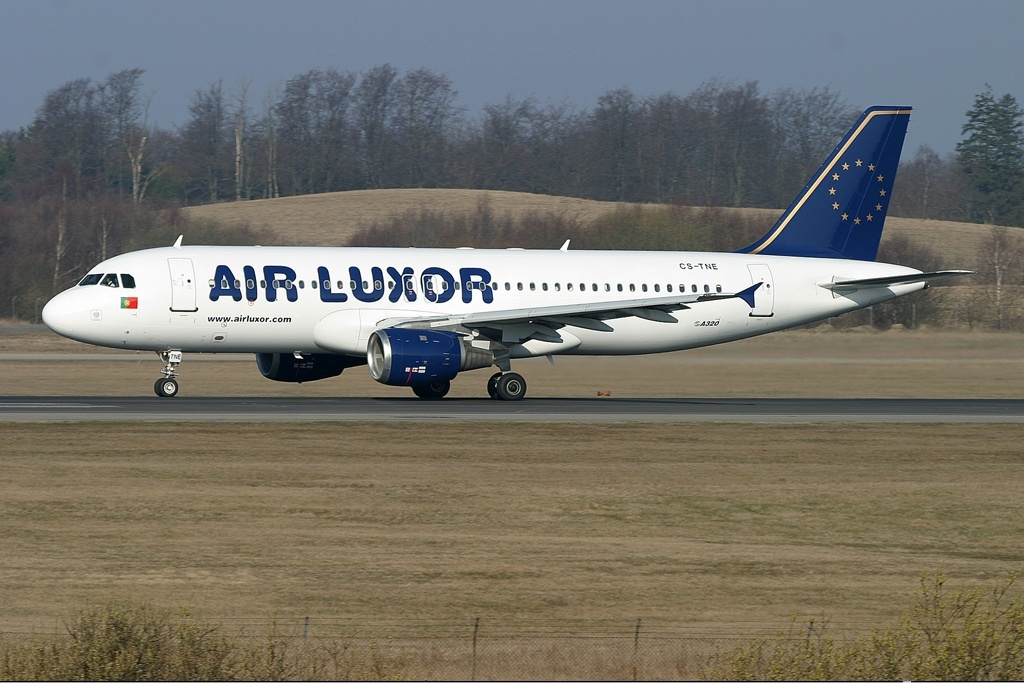
Air Luxor Airbus A320

Over the years, the Air Luxor fleet consisted of these aircraft types:

History of the Air Luxor fleet
Aircraft	Introduced	Retired
Airbus A319-100	2002	2003
Airbus A320-200	2000	2006
Airbus A321-200	2003	2003
Airbus A330-200	2003	2003
Airbus A330-300	2003	2005
Boeing 767-200	2001	2002
Lockheed L-1011	1997	2004
Short 330-100	1999	2000
