= Intelligiant =

Intelligiant is a water cannon invented by John Miscovich (1918 - August 22, 2014) in the post-WW2 years. His Intelligiant influenced the development of fire-fighting and hydraulic gold mining, with numerous other applications. Today it is known as a standard fire fighting cannon.
