= British Columbia gold rushes =

Gold rushes in British Columbia, Canada

British Columbia gold rushes were important episodes in the history and settlement of European, Canadian and Chinese peoples in western Canada.

The presence of gold in what is now British Columbia is spoken of in many old legends that, in part, led to its discovery. The Strait of Anian, claimed to have been sailed by Juan de Fuca for whom today's Strait of Juan de Fuca is named, was described as passing through a land (Anian) "rich in gold, silver, pearls and fur". Bergi (meaning "mountains"), another legendary land near Anian, was also said to be rich in gold as well. Speculative maps of northwestern North America published before the area was mapped placed the legendary golden cities of Quivira and Cibola in the far inland northwest. No Spanish exploration parties in search of El Dorado, "the golden one" a reference to the legendary king of a lost golden city, are known to have ever reached British Columbia, although archaeological remains point to a brief Spanish presence in the Okanagan and Similkameen regions of the province's Southern Interior. The Muchalaht, the Nuu-chah-nulth group in the area of the community of Gold River, on Vancouver Island, which is a community at the end of a fjord that drains the west coast of Vancouver Island, tell a story of Spanish arriving then burning the valley searching for gold. Prospectors searching the valley have found old crude dug adits on the pass of the White River Valley and the Gold River Valley.

== Queen Charlottes Gold Rush, 1850 ==
Gold was first formally discovered by non-indigenous people at Gold Harbour on the west coast of Moresby Island in Haida Gwaii, near the Haida village of Tasu on Mitchell Inlet, an arm of Gold Harbour (which is part of Tasu Sound). A brief gold rush – the Queen Charlottes Gold Rush – ensued in the following year, leading to the declaration of the Colony of the Queen Charlotte Islands to prevent the archipelago from being overrun by Americans and so claimed by the United States. The extent of the ore body proved superficial, and there are various stories of American prospecting parties harassed by the Haida people, who were still very numerous and powerful. In later times, Gold Harbour and Mitchell Inlet became the location of a modern mining operation, also called Tasoo or Tasu, but for iron rather than gold. In 1969, a local logger, Efrem Specogna and his brother-in-law, John Trinco made the initial gold discovery of the Specogna (Babe) Gold deposit west of Port Clements on Graham Island. By 1979, a 2 million ounce gold deposit was defined by exploratory drilling by major mining companies, Cominco, Kennco Explorations (a subsidiary of Kennecott) and Quintana Minerals. A junior exploration company continued drilling the project and a gold rush ensued from 1979–1981. The Specogna gold deposit remains an unmined deposit with over 3 million ounces of gold and is categorized as an epithermal type gold deposit.

== Tranquille, Thompson, and Fraser Gold Rushes ==
Gold discoveries are not reported in the journals of the early fur traders, and it became policy on the part of the fur companies to not advertise the presence of gold as the protection of the fur trade was the main corporate interest of their enterprise. Governor Etolin of Russian America expressly forbade news of gold discoveries as a serious crime against the state. Small quantities of gold were reported by traders in the 1830s and at some posts became current in local trading, though not common or in quantity. but Hudson's Bay Company policy, or the good judgement of the Chief Trader, kept news of such discoveries quiet until a large trove was brought into Fort Kamloops in 1856 by members of the nearby Tranquille tribe of the Secwepemc. When news of the find and a large poke of gold dust brought to James Douglas, Chief Factor of the Columbia Department at Fort Victoria and also Governor of Vancouver Island, decided to ship it to San Francisco for smelting. Some historians have suggested he did so deliberately to spread news of the gold find so as to provoke a gold rush so as to force Britain's hand on the status of the British mainland north of the 49th parallel, which since the Oregon Treaty had remained unincorporated and had remained solely the domain of the fur company and its native clientele. American miners had been appearing more frequently on British soil and Douglas felt he had to take action.

=== Fraser Rush and the founding of the Gold Colony ===
News of the finds in what was then known as New Caledonia hit California at a time of economic depression, when the gold fields were depopulated and many miners were in San Francisco, where the news hit like wildfire and overloaded steamers full of men equipped with not much more than gold pans and the clothes on their back headed north, along with entrepreneurs of all kinds and others seeking to profit not from the mines, but from the miners. Victoria, until then a "sleepy English village" of a few hundred people, was transformed into a tent city of some 30,000 within weeks in the spring of 1858, among them 4000 were Chinese. After initial complaints of a "humbug", because high water levels prevented mining, thousands returned to California, only to be replaced by others as water levels dropped and mining began in earnest. The first major find, and among the largest on the river, was at Hill's Bar about 15 kilometers south of Fort Yale, which had become the epicenter of the gold rush as it was at the head of river navigation and at the foot of the Fraser Canyon and its difficult trails and rich gold-bearing bars. Hill's Bar's first claim, known as the "Boatmen of San Francisco", worked the bar alongside Chief Kowpelst and his people, the Spuzzum tribe of the Nlaka'pamux, whose village was just north of Fort Yale. The mining population, split into thirds about evenly between Americans, Chinese, and a mix of Britons and Europeans who had been in California, many since the California Gold Rush ten years earlier, entered into conflict when two French miners violated a Nlaka'pamux girl near Lytton, then called "the Forks", and their beheaded bodies were seen floating down the river. In the ensuing unrest, known as the Fraser Canyon War, most of the mining population fled the Canyon for Spuzzum and Yale, and war parties composed of Americans, Germans, French and others (many who had been mercenaries in Nicaragua, or in service of France in Mexico), forayed up the canyon and made a peace with the Nlaka'pamux, though many were killed on both sides. News of the war had reached Victoria in the meantime and Governor Douglas was forced to take action to enforce British authority and sovereignty on the mainland and set out by steamer with Royal Marines and the newly arrived first contingent of Royal Engineers for the gold fields. En route, the party stopped at Fort Langley, then still located at Derby, where Douglas declared the Colony of British Columbia and was sworn in as its first Governor, on August 1, 1858. Proceeding without much incident to Yale, where news of the governor's journey upriver had travelled in advance, the Governor and his troops were greeted by the war parties or "Companies" that had engaged in the war, flying the British flag and greeting the Governor with a formal welcome. Admonishing them that the colony had been established and the Queen's Law would prevail, the governor appointed officials who would later lead to a series of events known as McGowan's War over the course of the next winter. Also while at Yale, Douglas decreed the creation of subscriptions by which parties of men could pay for the right to construct a new route to the "Upper Fraser" via the Lakes Route, as a way around the dangers of the canyon trail and continued fears about the Nlaka'pamux. the "Upper Fraser" was the area of Lillooet and Fountain and several thousand miners had arrived in that region via overland routes through Oregon and Washington Territory, despite an injunction from Douglas that all access to the goldfields would be through Victoria only. Those who came by those routes, the busiest but war-ridden Okanagan Trail, also spread farther afield in the Interior, leading to gold discoveries further and further afield and a string of small and large gold rushes including what would become the largest and most famous, the Cariboo Gold Rush. Not for nothing that among the most common sobriquet used at the time for the new Mainland Colony was "the Gold Colonies".

== The Cariboo Gold Rush 1861–1867 ==
By 1860, there were gold discoveries in the middle basin of the Quesnel River around Keithley Creek and Quesnel Forks, just below and west of Quesnel Lake. Exploration of the region intensified as news of the discoveries got out, and because of the distances and times involved in communications and travel in those times, moreover because of the remoteness of the country, the Cariboo Rush did not begin in earnest until 1862 after the discovery of Williams Creek in 1861 and the relocation of the focus of the rush to the creek valleys in the northern Cariboo Plateau forming the headwaters of the Willow River and the north slope of the basin of the Quesnel. The rush, though initially discovered by American-based parties, became notably Canadian, Maritimer and British in character, with those who became established in the Cariboo among the vanguard of the movement to join Canada as the 1860s progressed. Many Americans returned to the United States at the opening of the Civil War, though there were American draft dodgers that fled to the Cariboo in the Civil War era. Others went on to the Fort Colvile Gold Rush, Idaho Gold Rush, and Colorado Gold Rush. Some went elsewhere in the Intermontane West, including other parts of British Columbia, in addition to those who had come and gone during the advent and wane of the Cariboo rush. To preserve British authority and retain control over the traffic of gold out of the region, the Governor commissioned the building of the Cariboo Road, a.k.a. the Queen's Highway, and a route from Lillooet and also established the Gold Escort, although that government agency never proved viable and private expressmen dominated the shipment of goods and mail into the gold fields, and gold out of it (see Francis Jones Barnard and B.X. Express). Among other events associated with the Cariboo Gold Rush was the Chilcotin War of 1864, provoked by an attempt to build a wagon road from Bute Inlet to Cariboo via the Homathko River. In addition to the gold rush's capital and destination of the Cariboo Road Barkerville, dozens of small towns and mining camps sprang up across the rainy, swampy hills of the Cariboo, some such as Bullion and Antler Creek attaining mining fame in their own right. The Cariboo gold fields have remained active to this day, and have also yielded other boomtowns, such as Wells, a one-time company town of 3,000 in the 1920s just a few kilometres west of Barkerville, which today is a museum town, and one of the larger deep-rock mines in the Cariboo mining district. The city of Quesnel, remained important after the wane of the rush as the jumping-off point for other goldfields discovered yet farther and farther north in the Omineca and Peace River Country to the north of Fort George (today's city of Prince George), then only a small fur post and Indian reserve.

== Minor Gold Rushes 1859–1869 ==
- Blackfoot Gold Rush, 1859
- Similkameen Gold Rush, 1861
- Rock Creek Gold Rush
- Peace River Gold Rush, 1861 (a.k.a. Finlay Gold Rush)
- Stikine Gold Rush, 1861
  - The Finlay and Peace-Finlay Gold Rushes prompted the declaration of the Stickeen Territories, which lay north of the colony's boundary, the line of the Nass and Finlay Rivers, extending to the 62nd parallel, west of the Rockies.
- Shuswap Gold Rush (Spallumcheen River)
- Cherry Creek Gold Rush (Cherryville)
- Big Bend Gold Rush, 1865
- Omineca Gold Rush
- Wild Horse Creek Gold Rush (Fisherville and Fort Steele)
- Goldstream Gold Rush at the Goldstream River in 1863
- Leechtown in 1864-5
- Burnt Basin Gold Rush

== See also ==
- Klondike Gold Rush (1897–1898)
- Fort Colville Gold Rush
- Colony of British Columbia
- Gold rush
