= Cariboo Gold Rush =

19th-century gold rush in British Columbia, Canada

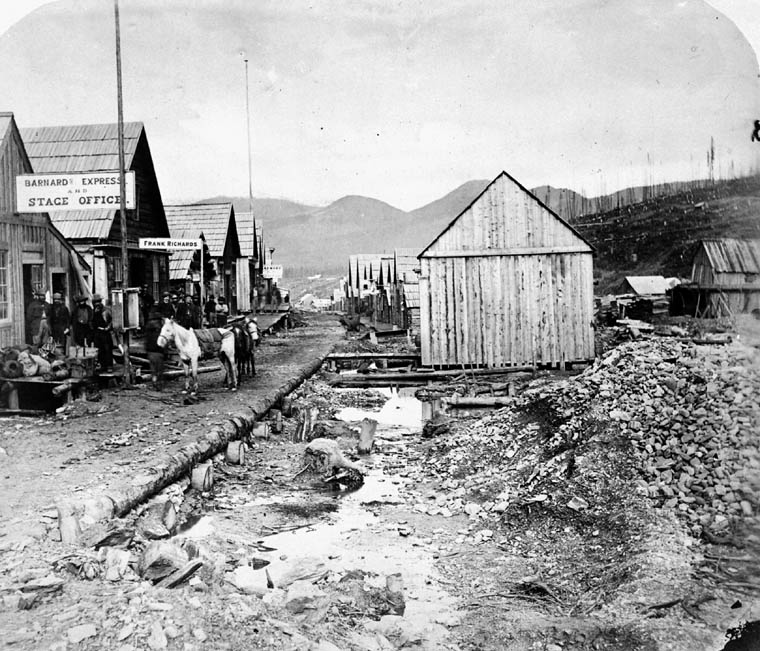
Barkerville (1865), shown rebuilt after the Great Fire, with its new, straightened and wider, Main Street. The creek in the foreground is Williams Creek, which is paralleled by Main Street throughout.

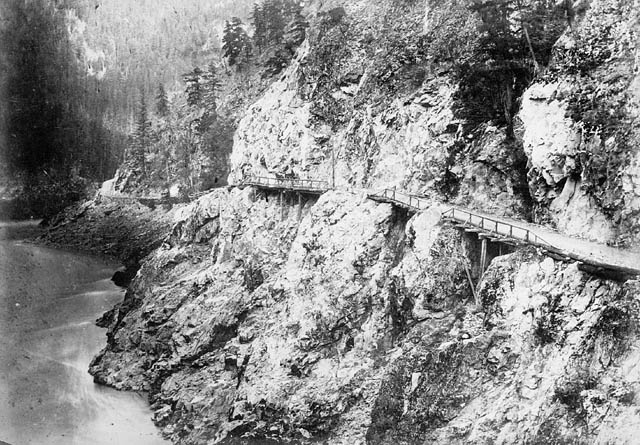
The Cariboo Road in the Fraser Canyon, 1867

The Cariboo Gold Rush was a gold rush in the Colony of British Columbia, which later became the Canadian province of British Columbia. The first gold discovery was made at Hills Bar in 1858, followed by more strikes in 1859 on the Horsefly River, and on Keithley Creek and Antler Creek in 1860. The actual rush did not begin until 1861, when the discoveries were widely publicized. By 1865, following the strikes along Williams Creek, the rush was in full swing.

Towns grew up, the most famous being Barkerville, now preserved as a heritage site and tourist attraction. Other important towns of the Cariboo gold rush era were Keithley Creek, Quesnel Forks or simply "the Forks," Antler, Richfield, Quesnellemouthe (which would later be shortened to Quesnel), Horsefly and, around the site of the Hudson's Bay Company's fort of the same name, Alexandria.

== Differences between Cariboo and Fraser Canyon rushes ==
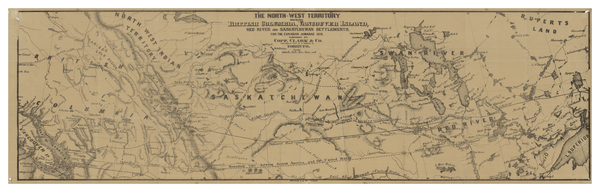
The Cariboo Gold Region can be seen towards the northwest corner of the map (1870).

The Cariboo Gold Rush is the most famous of the gold rushes in British Columbia, so much so that it is sometimes erroneously cited as the reason for the creation of the Colony of British Columbia. The Colony's creation had been prompted by an influx of American prospectors to the Fraser Canyon Gold Rush three years earlier in 1858, which had its locus in the area from Lillooet to Yale.

Unlike its southern counterpart, the population of the Cariboo Gold Rush was largely British and Canadian. Among them were 4000 Chinese although the first wave of the rush was largely American. When the gold rush broke out, there was more active interest in the Gold Colony (as British Columbia was often referred to) in the United Kingdom and Canada and there had also been time required for more British and Canadians to get there. The electorate of the Cariboo riding were among the most supportive Confederation in the colony, and that was in no small part because of the strong Canadian element in the local populace.

One reason the Cariboo rush attracted fewer Americans than the original Fraser rush may have been the American Civil War, with many who had been around after the Fraser Gold Rush going home to take sides, or to the Fort Colville Gold Rush, which was largely manned by men who had been on the Fraser or to other BC rushes such as those at Rock Creek and Big Bend.

While some of the population that came for the Cariboo rush stayed on as permanent settlers, taking up land in various parts of the Interior in the 1860s and afterward, that was not the general rule for those involved in the Fraser rush. Many veterans of the Cariboo would spread out to explore the rest of the province, in particular triggering the Omineca and Cassiar Gold Rushes, just as the Cariboo itself had been found by miners seeking out in search of new finds from the Fraser rush.

== Cariboo Wagon Road ==
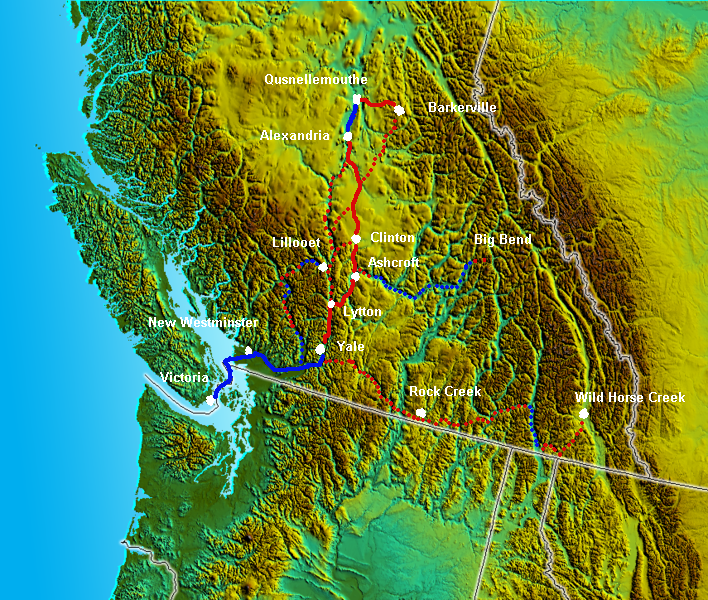
Route of the Cariboo Road in red. Steamboat travel in blue; dotted lines are alternate routes or routes to other goldfields. Trails, Roads and Water Routes in Colonial British Columbia. The Dewdney Trail was the dotted line across the south of the colony.

The boom in the Cariboo goldfields was the impetus for the construction of the Cariboo Wagon Road by the Royal Engineers, which bypassed the older routes via the Fraser Canyon and the Lakes Route (Douglas Road) via Lillooet by using the canyon of the Thompson River to Ashcroft and from there via the valley of the Bonaparte River to join the older route from Lillooet at Clinton.

Towns along the Cariboo Road include Clinton, 100 Mile House and Williams Lake, although most had their beginnings before the Cariboo rush began. During the rush, the largest and most important town lay at the road's end at Barkerville, which had grown up around the most profitable and famous of the many Cariboo mining camps.

The Cariboo Wagon Road was an immense infrastructure burden for the colony but needed to be built to enable access and bring governmental authority to the Cariboo goldfields, which was necessary in order to maintain and assert control of the wealth, which might more easily have passed through the Interior to the United States.

The wagon road's most important freight was the Gold Escort, which brought government bullion to Yale for shipment to the colonial treasury. Despite the wealth of the Cariboo goldfields, the expense of colonizing the Cariboo contributed to the Mainland Colony's virtual bankruptcy and its forced union with the Island Colony and similarly into Confederation.

== In literature ==
Cariboo Road by Alan Sullivan (published 1946), is a fictional historical novel about a family that travels from San Francisco to seek gold near Williams Creek. The story is set in 1862.

A 1976 young adult novel, Cariboo Runaway, by Sandy Frances Duncan, is set in the Cariboo area during the Cariboo Gold Rush.

== See also ==
- Cariboo camels
- Hudson's Bay Brigade Trail
- Old Cariboo Road
- Omineca Gold Rush
- River Trail
