= Jugla Lake =

Lake in Latvia

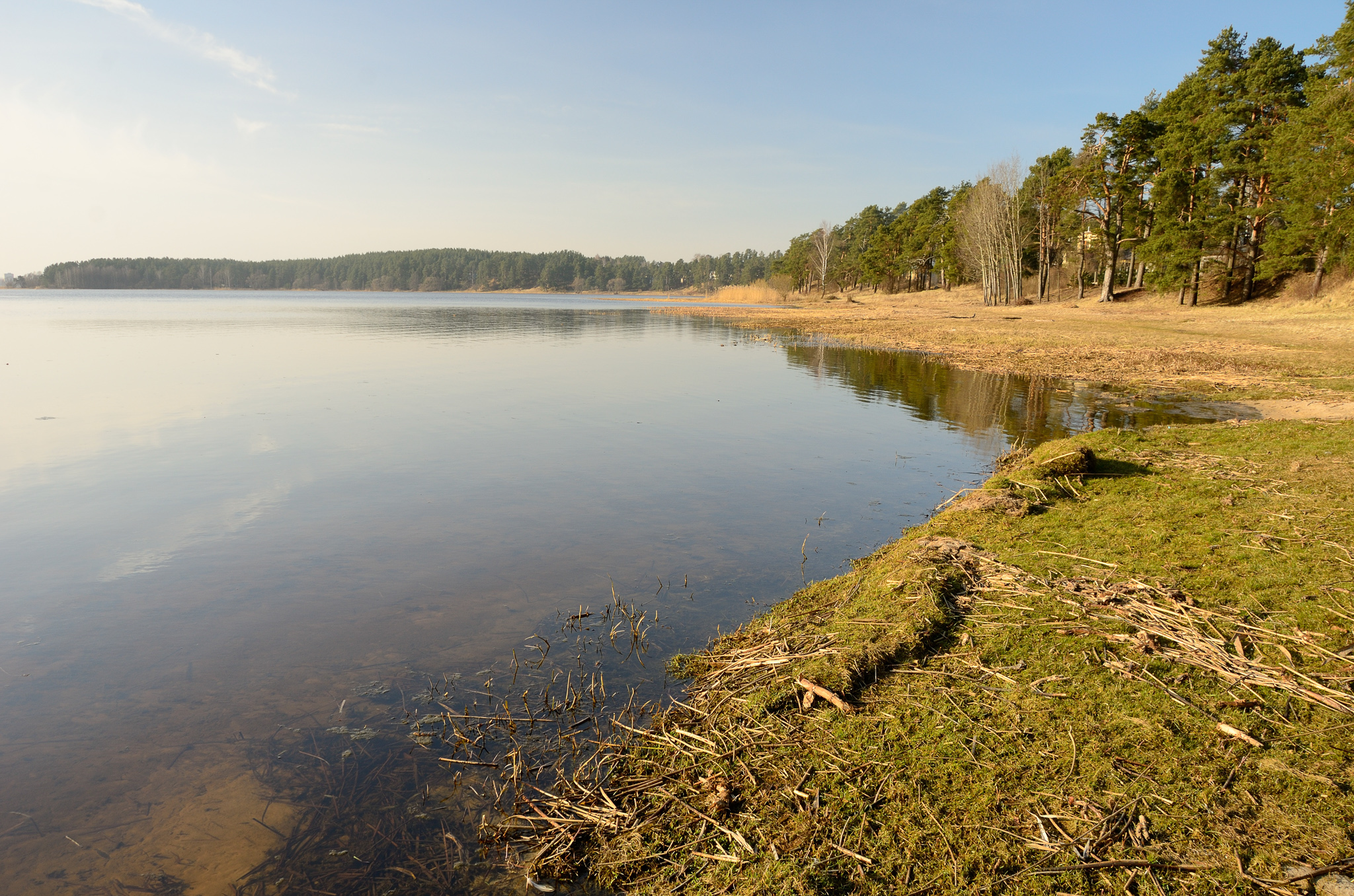
- Jugla Lake near Berģi

- Location within Latvia
- Location: Riga
- Coordinates: 56.98035°N 24.28215°E
- Primary inflows: Jugla, Piķurga
- Primary outflows: Jugla
- Catchment area: Daugava
- Basin countries: Latvia
- Max. length: 4.6 km (2.9 mi)
- Surface area: 5.7 km^{2} (2.2 sq mi)
- Average depth: 1.7 metres (5 ft 7 in)
- Max. depth: 5 metres (16 ft)
- Surface elevation: 0.2 m (7.9 in)
- Islands: 1
- Settlements: Riga

Jugla Lake (Latvian: Juglas ezers) is a large and scenic urban lake in Jugla, Riga, Latvia. The lake has popular beaches in the summer and ice fishing in the winter.

The Ethnographic Open-Air Museum of Latvia is an open-air museum, situated in a forest park area beside Jugla Lake.

== See also ==
- Ķīšezers, Riga
