= Similkameen Gold Rush =

1860 gold rush in British Columbia, Canada

The Similkameen Gold Rush, also known as the Blackfoot Gold Rush, was a minor gold rush in the Similkameen Country of the Southern Interior of British Columbia, Canada, in 1860. The Similkameen Rush was one of a flurry of small rushes peripheral to the Fraser Canyon Gold Rush, which had drawn tens of thousands of prospectors to the new colony in 1858-1859, among the others being Rock Creek Gold Rush and Big Bend.

Discovery of gold on the upper Similkameen River in 1860 led to the establishment of the town of Blackfoot, also known as Blackfoot Flat and adjoined by a neighbouring settlement, Blackwood Flat, seven miles southwest of what is now Princeton near the site of the later mining town-cum-ghost town Allenby. The population of the town in the fall of 1860 was approximately 100, a mix of white and Chinese miners. By the summer of 1861 its population was reported as only about 50.

High water made mining operations on the river difficult, but bench claims, above the water-mark, proved successful and one shaft was sunk in an effort to find hard-rock deposits. Blackfoot and Blackwood Flat contained 40 houses, including a store and other services.

Blackfoot disappeared nearly as quickly as it had appeared as the ever-fickle miners moved on in search of richer and easier diggings. Six years after being one of the original participants on the Similkameen Rush, "Jackass John" returned from prospecting in Montana and the Kootenays. He mined on the same spot where he had made $40 in two days during the original rush and in fourteen days had taken $900. He enlisted three friends and worked the mine; historian H.H. Bancroft notes that the four partners sluiced $240 in three days.

"An article in the Similkameen Star in 1935 that the site of Blackfoot was "relocated and identified with Kruger's bar. According to H. Jamieson iron spikes in a river boulder indicated until recently where a bridge had crossed to the store and hotel on (the) south side of the river. Theodore Kruger, who gave his name to the (bar), was born in Hanover in 1929, and came to British Columbia in 1858. Like Mr. Allison, who arrived the same year, he had tried mining on the Fraser before coming to Similkameen".

In the 1880s, discovery of further placer diggings on the South Fork of the Similkameen River led to the Tulameen Gold Rush and the founding of Granite Creek and Tulameen.

Despite ending nearly 200 years ago, locals often find small bits of gold and platinum in the Similkameen River where people panned. The water is murky and fish do not inhabit the river.

== See also ==
- British Columbia Gold Rushes
- Fraser Canyon Gold Rush
