= Sandy Duncan (disambiguation) =

Sandy Duncan (born 1946) is an American actress and singer.

Sandy Duncan may also refer to:

- Sandy Duncan (athlete) (1912–2005), English athlete
- Sandy Frances Duncan (born 1942), Canadian writer
