= Jugla, Riga =

Neighbourhood of Riga, Latvia

Coordinates: 56.9789°N 24.2461°E

Jugla
- Neighbourhood of Riga
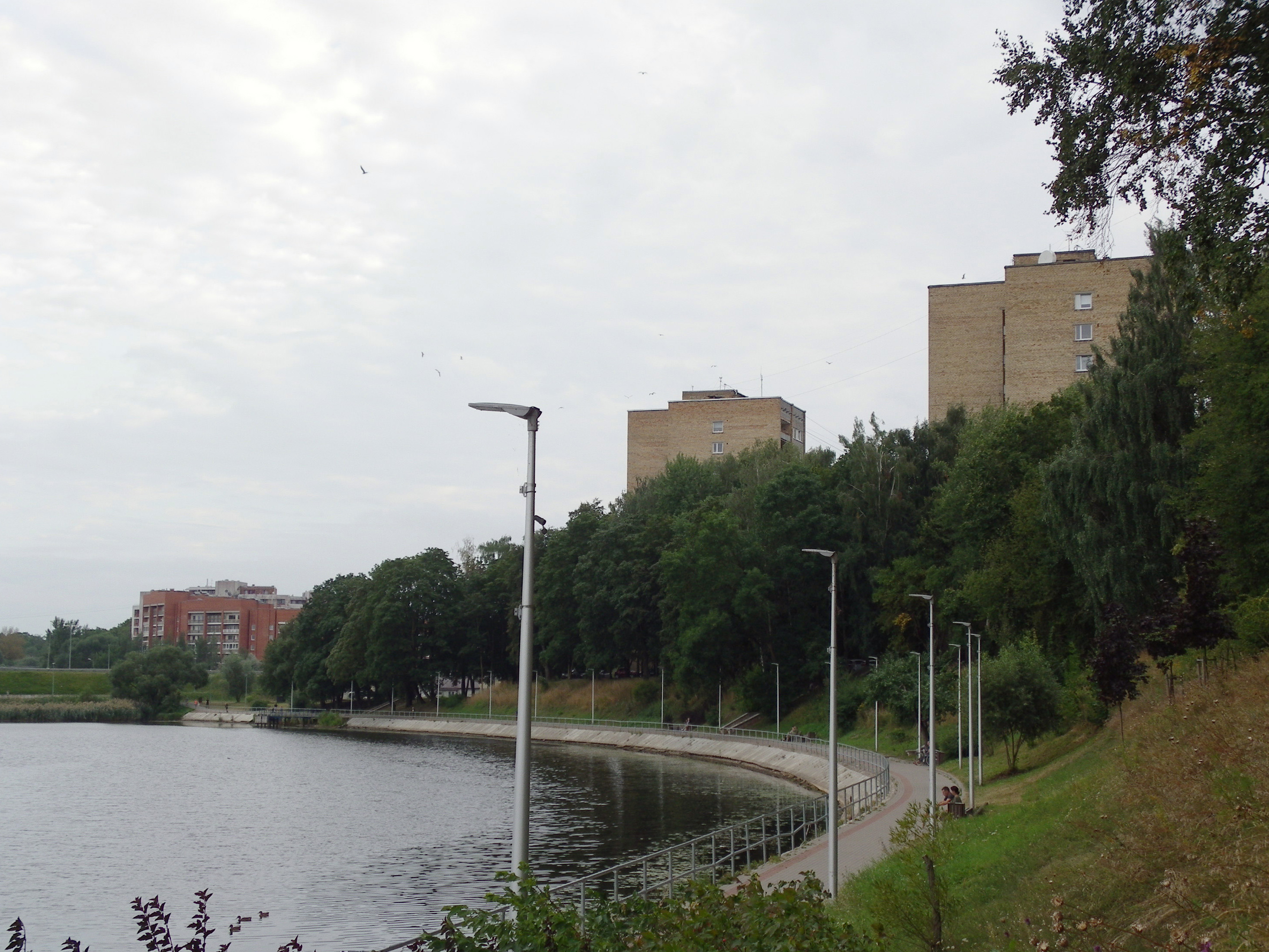
- Jugla Promenade (Vidzemes aleja/Vidzeme Alley)

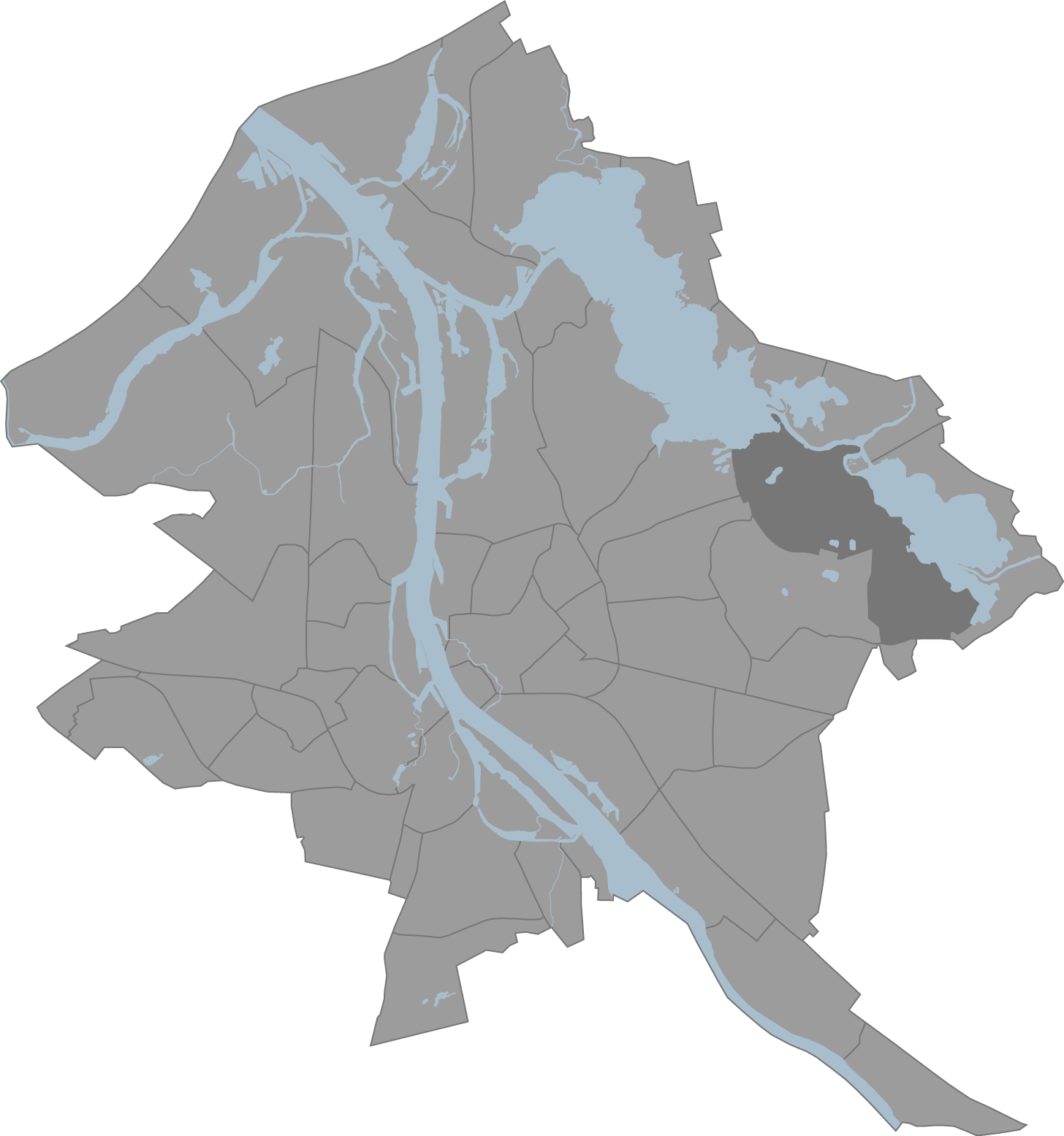
- Location of Jugla in Riga
- Country: Latvia
- City: Riga
- District: Vidzeme Suburb

Area
  - Total: 14.099 km^{2} (5.444 sq mi)

Population (2024)
  - Total: 22,087
  - Density: 1,566.6/km^{2} (4,057.4/sq mi)
- Website: apkaimes.lv

Jugla is a neighbourhood of Riga, the capital of Latvia. It is located in the Vidzeme Suburb, west of the Lake Jugla and southeast of the Lake Ķīšezers. Jugla is bordered by Čiekurkalns, Mežciems and Teika to the west, Dreiliņi to the southwest, Brekši to the southeast and Bukulti to the east.

== History ==
The name Jugla is generally considered to have originated from the Livonian words joig, joik, jok ('river').

Jugla is the location of Strazdumuiža Manor, first mentioned in 1528.

== Gallery ==
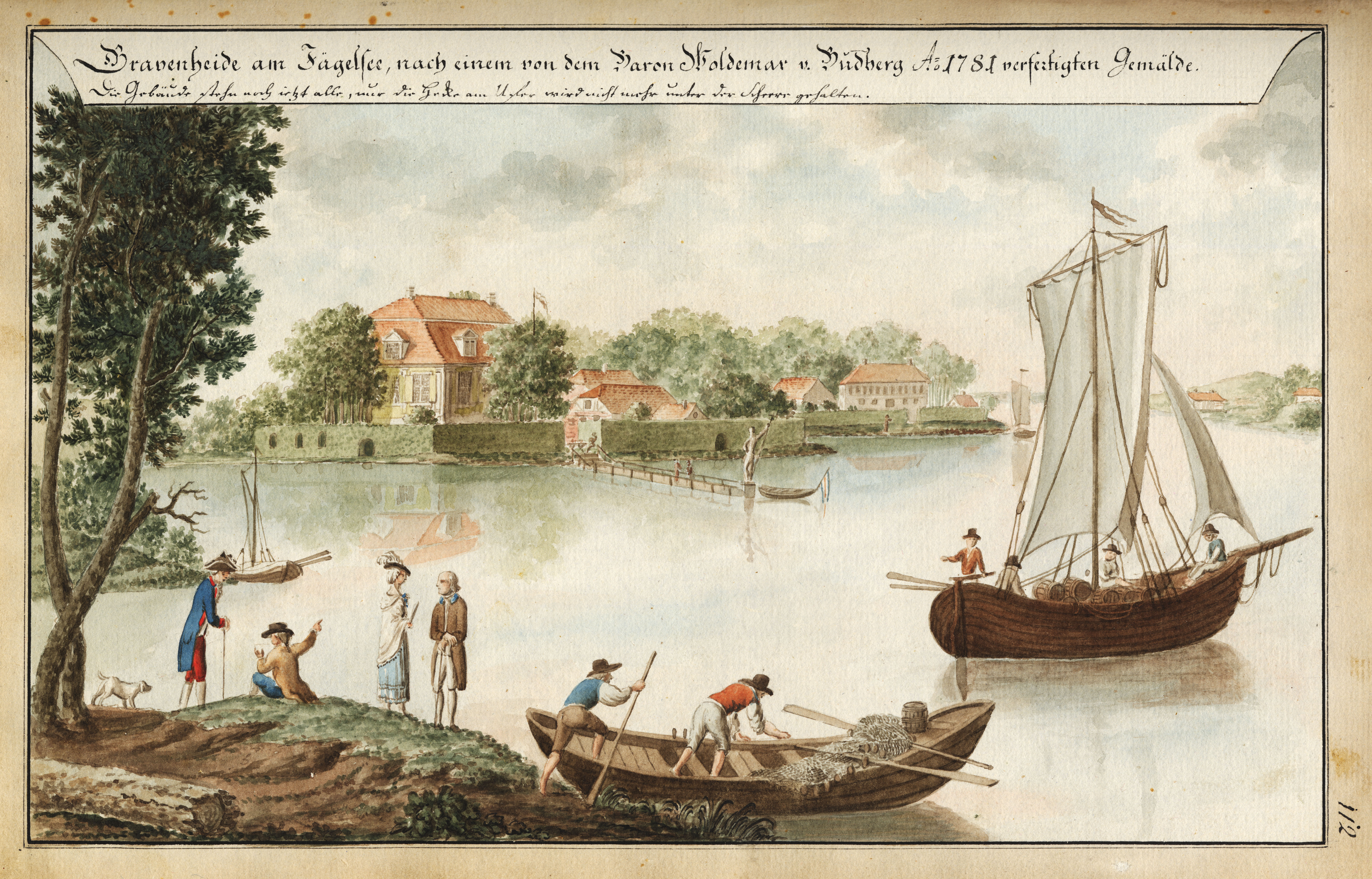
Former Gravenheide Manor near Jugla Lake, by Johann Christoph Brotze, 1781

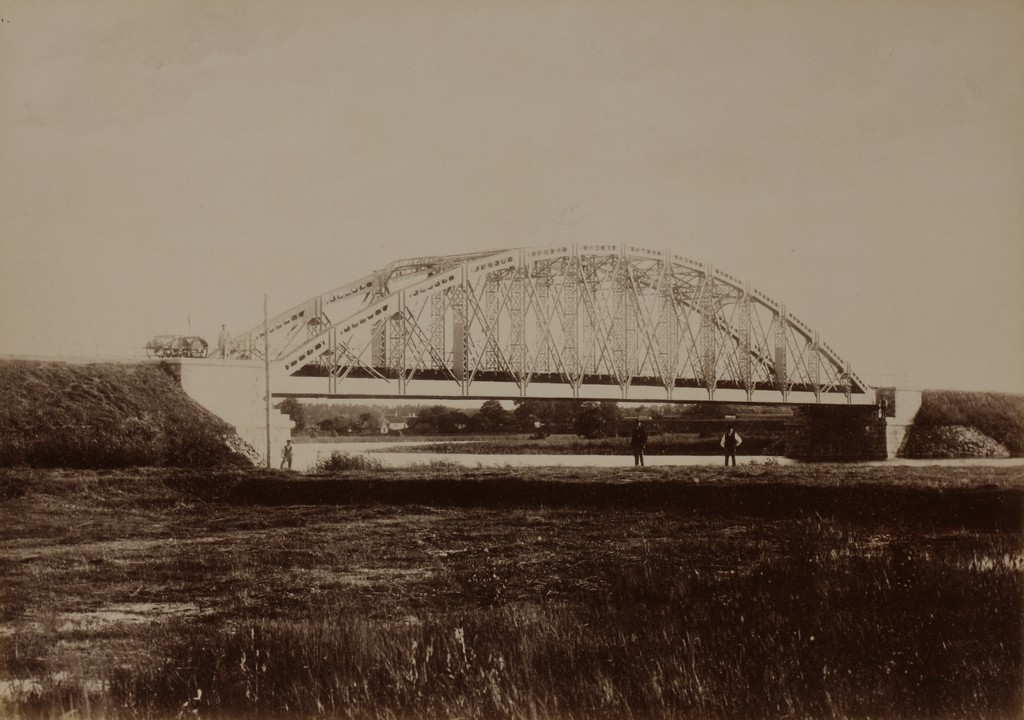
Jugla Railway Bridge in 1889

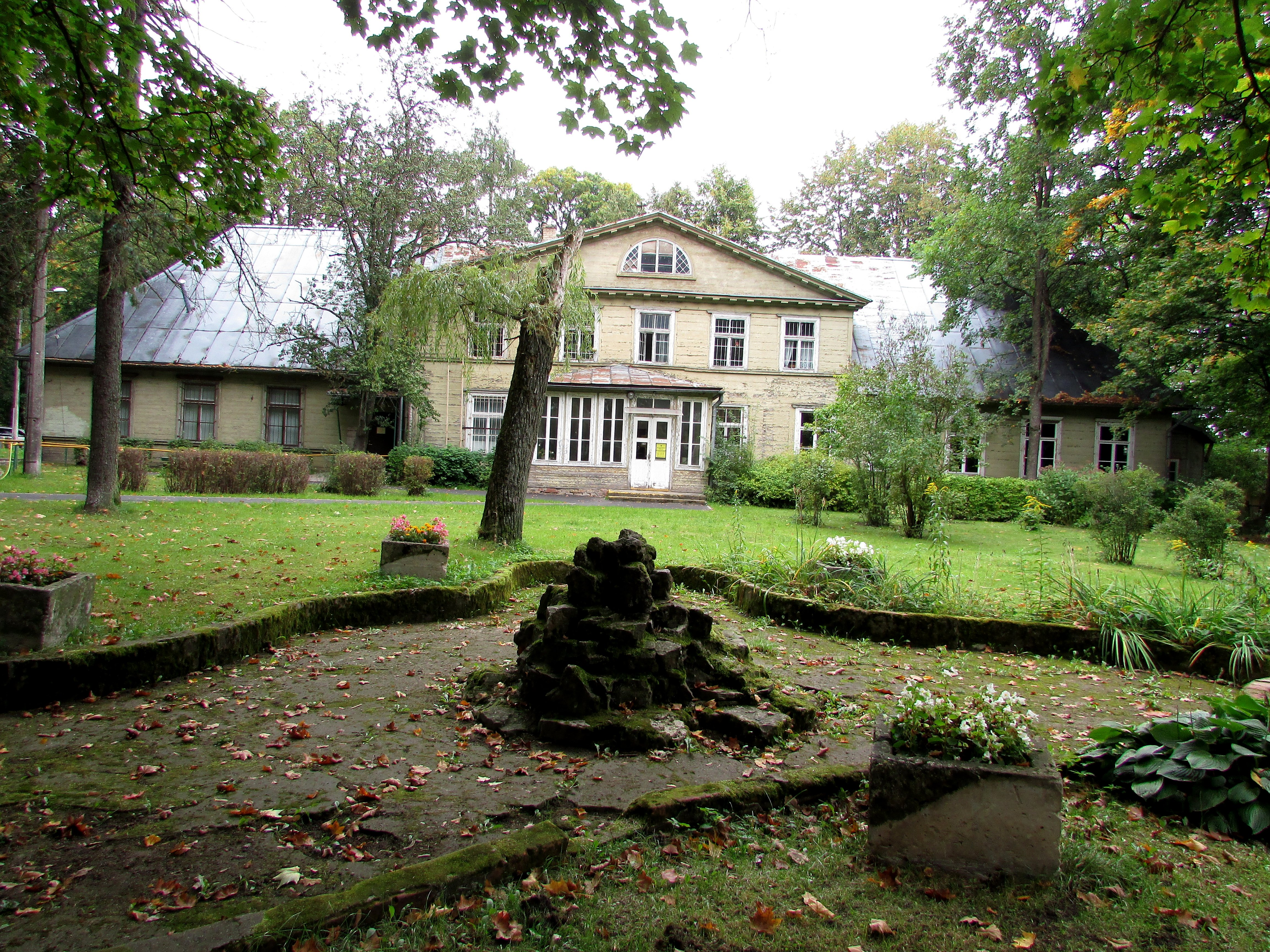
Strazdumuiža Manor (Pychlau House) at Pāles iela 14

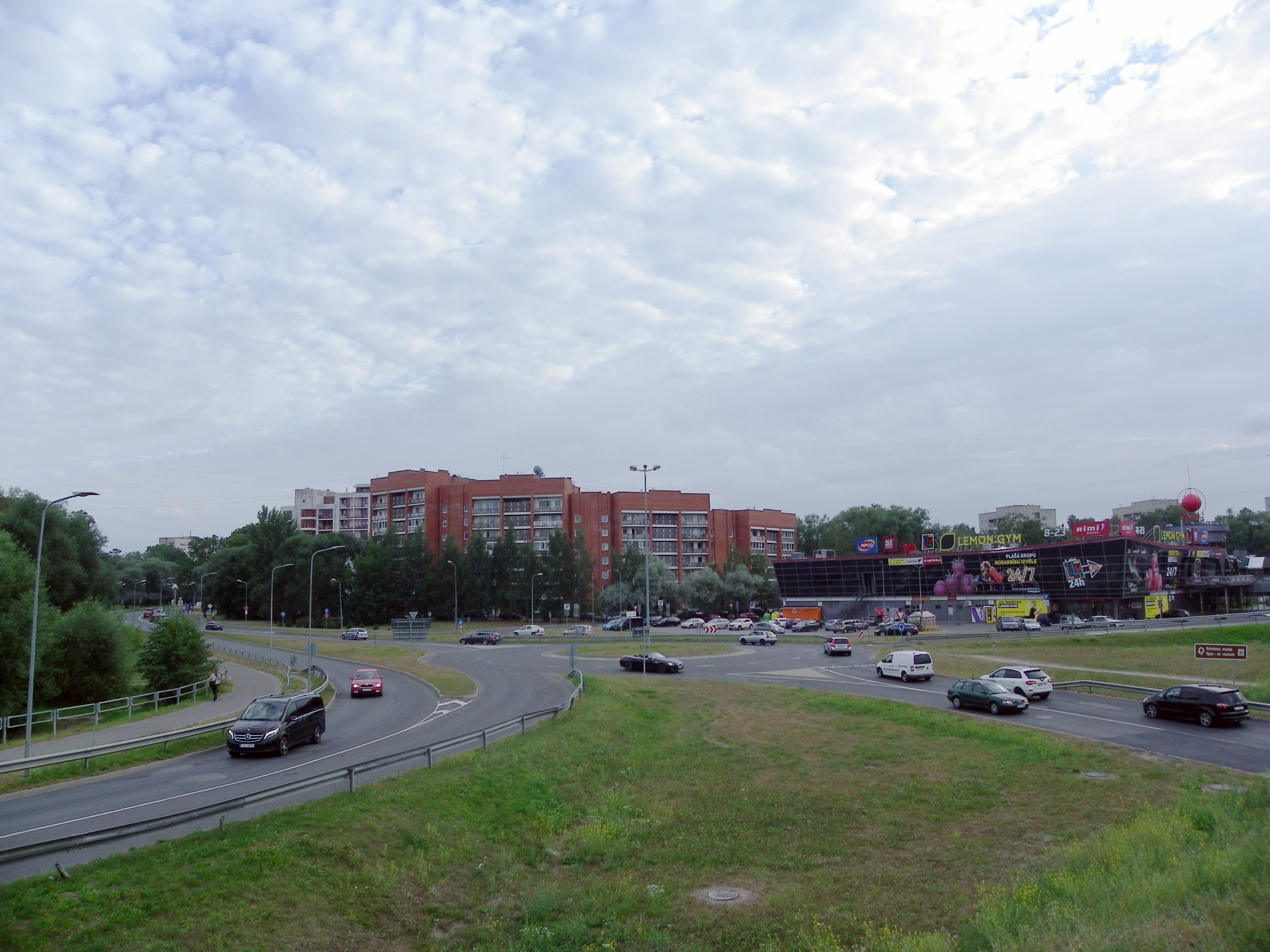
Juglas Centrs shopping mall and Soviet-era housing on Juglas iela

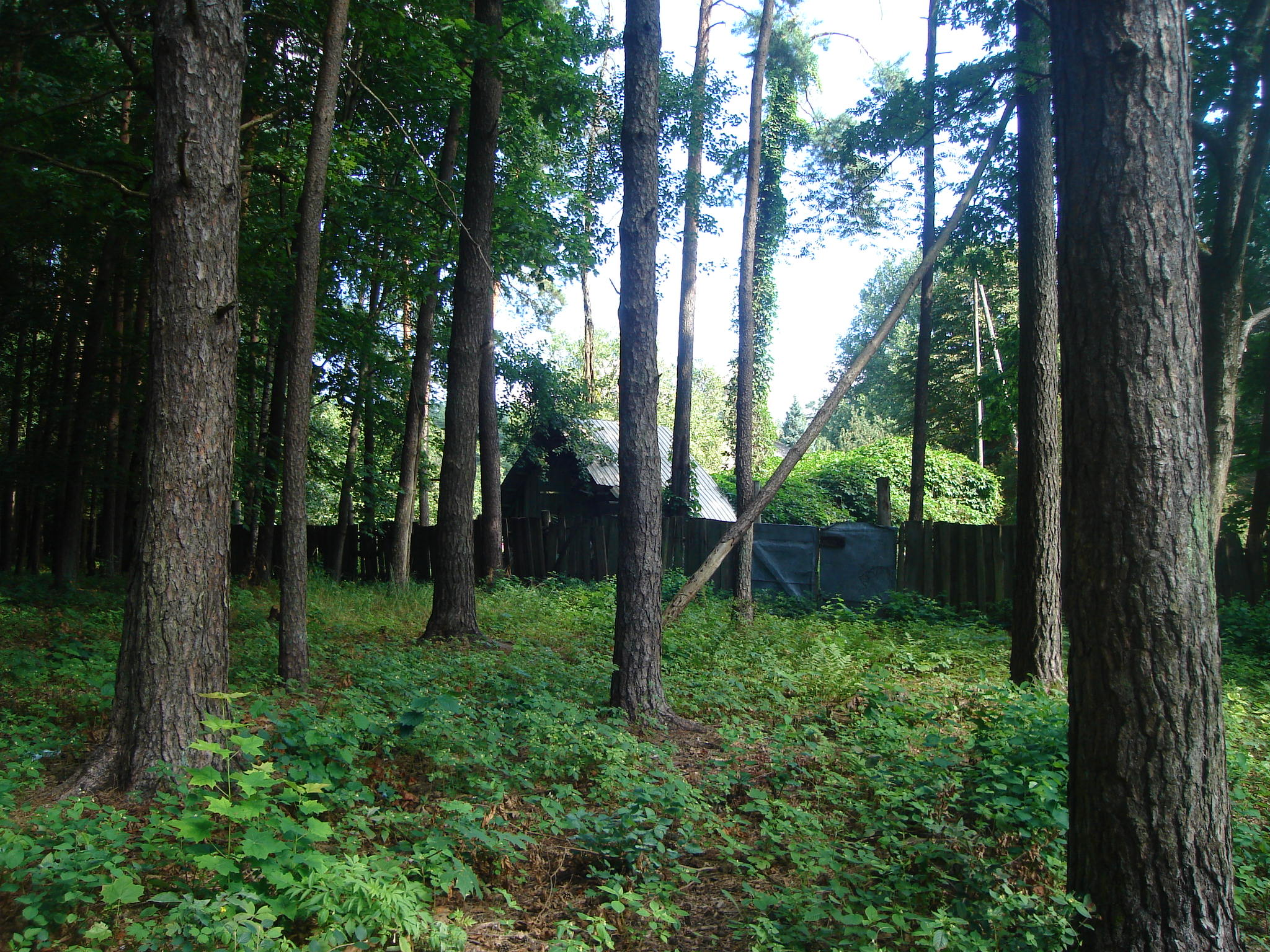
Šmerļa mežs (Šmerlis Forest) forestry office

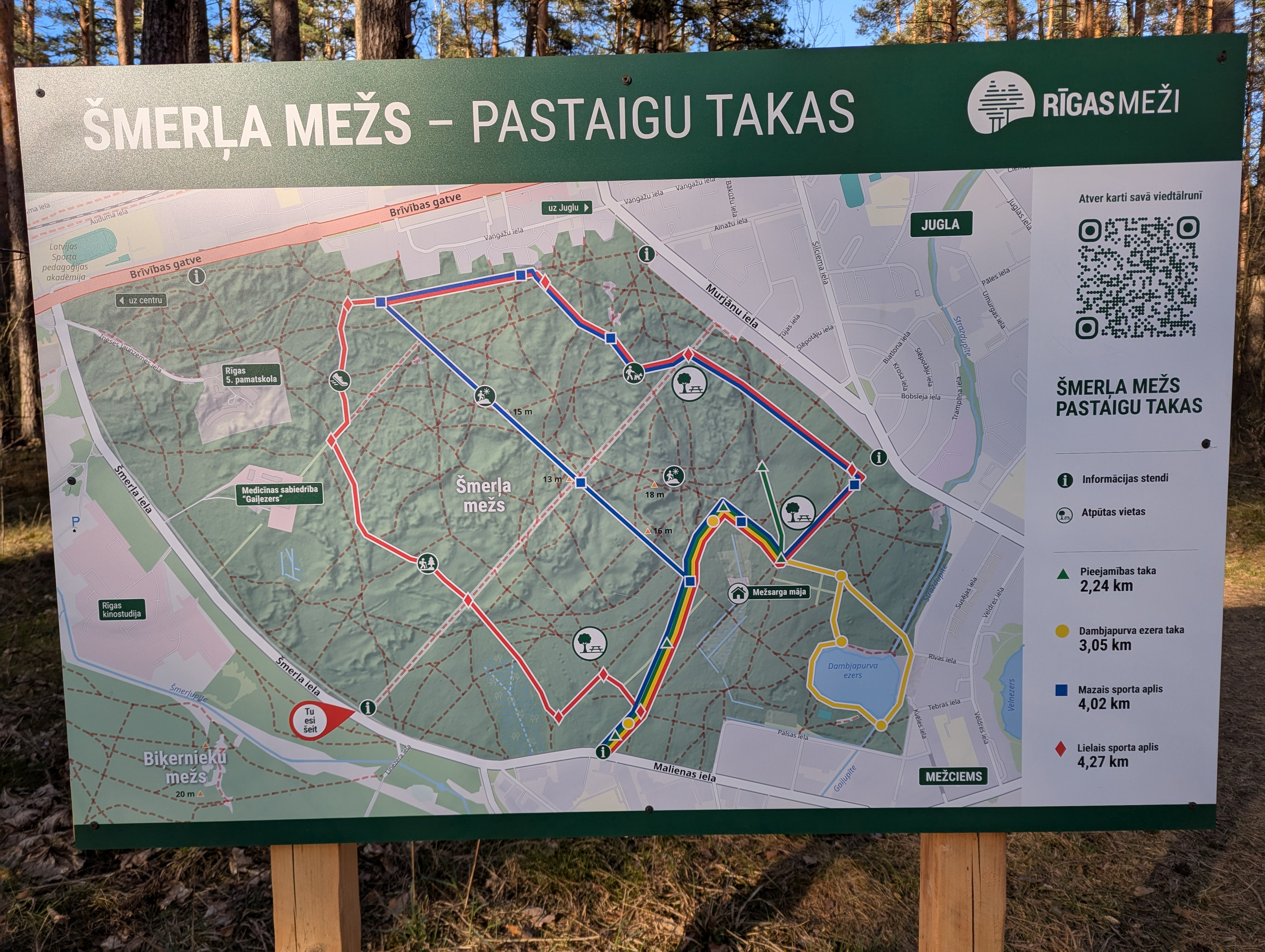
Map of Šmerļa mežs trails

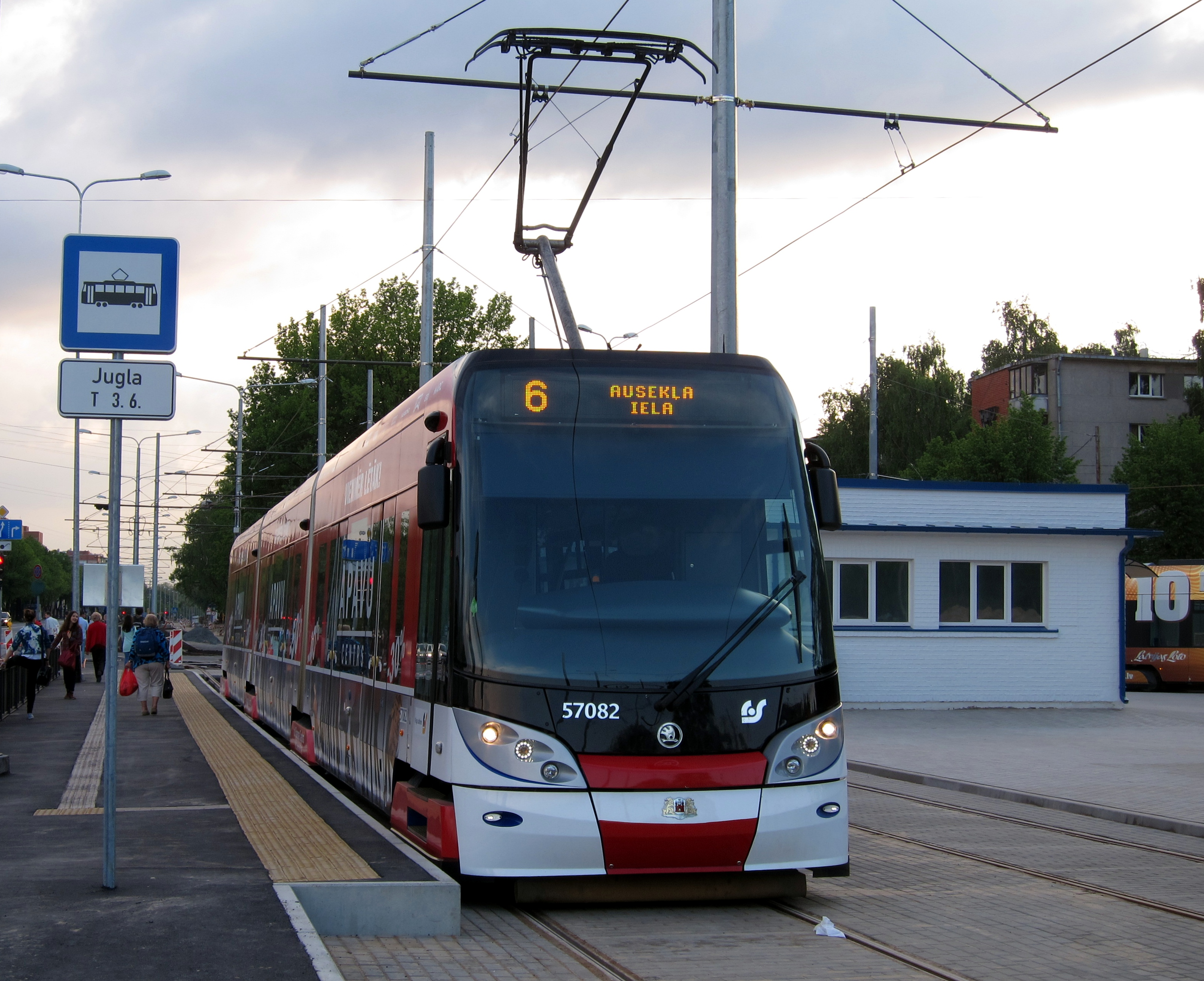
Jugla tram stop

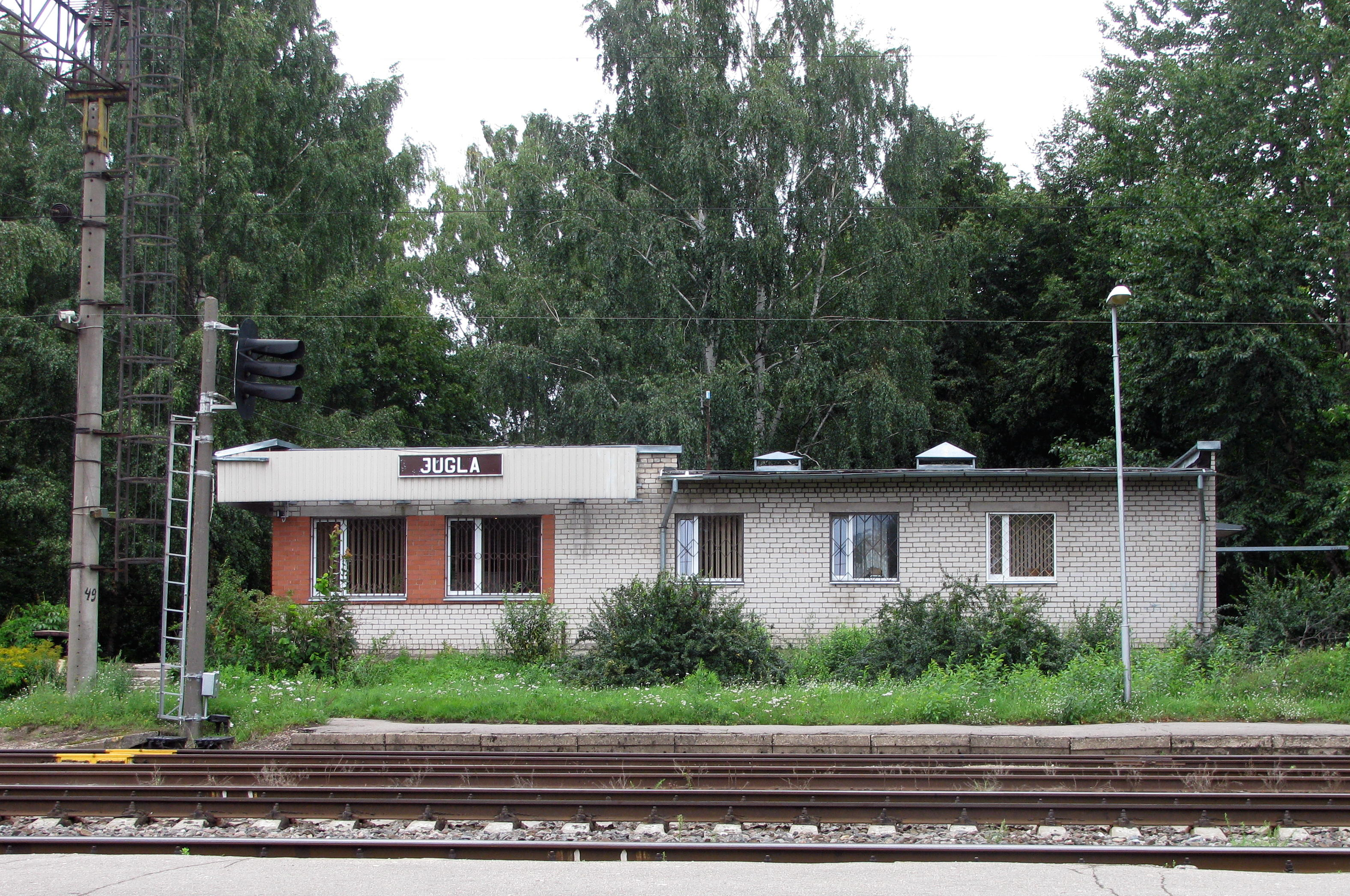
Jugla Railway Station
