= George Szanto =

American-Canadian novelist, playwright, critic, and scholar

- Born: 1940 (age 85–86); Derry, Northern Ireland
- Other name: George H. Szanto
- Education: Dartmouth College; University of Frankfurt am Main; University of Aix-Marseille; Harvard University, Ph.D. 1967
- Occupations: Novelist, playwright, critic
- Organizations: Modern Language Association of America; International Comparative Literature Association; Writers Union of Canada
- Spouse: Alison Szanto
- Awards: Fellow of the Royal Society of Canada; Hugh MacLennan Award for Fiction
- Website: http://georgeszanto.com/

George Szanto (born 1940) is an American-Canadian novelist, playwright, critic, and scholar. His published work includes more than a dozen novels and short-story collections as well as plays, full-length works of literary criticism, mysteries, and a memoir. His work has also appeared in literary periodicals including the Kansas Quarterly, the Bucknell Review, the Massachusetts Review, and the Canadian Comparative Literature Review and in anthologies. He is a fellow of the Royal Society of Canada, and he won the Hugh MacLennan Award for Fiction in 1995 for his novel Friends & Marriages.

Born in Derry, Northern Ireland, Szanto attended Dartmouth College in the United States, the University of Frankfurt am Main in Germany, and the University of Aix-Marseille in France before completing a Ph.D. at Harvard University in 1967. During his academic career, Szanto taught comparative and dramatic literature at the University of California, San Diego, and comparative literature at McGill University, Montreal, Quebec.

== Bibliography ==
=== Short story collections ===
- Sixteen Ways to Skin a Cat (1977)
- Duets (with Per Brask) (1989)

=== Novels ===
- Not Working (1982)
- The Underside of Stones: A Story Cycle (1990)
- Friends & Marriages (1994)
- The Condesa of M (2001)
- Second Sight (2004)
- The Tartarus House on Crab
- Whatever Lola Wants (2014)

=== Mysteries ===
Four novels, co-authored with Sandy Frances Duncan, comprise the Islands Investigations International Mysteries, as follows:

- Never Sleep with a Suspect on Gabriola Island (2009)
- Always Kiss the Corpse on Whidbey Island (2010)
- Never Hug a Mugger on Quadra Island (2011)
- Always Love a Villain on San Juan Island (2013)

=== Criticism ===
- Narrative Consciousness: Structure and Perception in the Fiction of Kafka, Beckett and Robbe-Grillet (1972)
- Theater and Propaganda (1978)
- Narrative Taste and Social Perspectives: The Matter of Quality (1987)
- Inside the Statues of Saints: Mexican Writers Talk About Culture and Corruption, Politics and Daily Life

=== Biography ===
- Bog Tender: Coming Home to Nature and Memory (2013)

=== Drama ===
- The New Black Crook (1971)
- Chinchill! (with Milton Savage) (1972)
- After the Ceremony (1978)
- The Next Move (1981)

=== Satire ===
- A modest proposition to the people of Canada concerning the pervasive ills and divisions afflicting the nation, including but not limited to the anguish of a land rent asunder by heinous tax bills, curtailment of economic opportunity, the plight of the middle classes, and Quebec (with Per Brask and the Committee Responsible for the Oversight of Canadian Conflict) (1992)

== Awards ==
- Hugh MacLennan Award for Fiction (1995) for Friends & Marriages
- Finalist, The Voices of Canada (1980)
- Finalist, Books in Canada First Novel Award (1984) for Not Working
- Silver Foundation Medal, National Magazine Awards (1988) for "How Ali Cran Got His Name"
- Fellow, Royal Society of Canada (1988)
- ACTRA winner, Southwest Theatre Conference New Play Project for The New Black Crook
