= The Ethnographic Open-Air Museum of Latvia =

Coordinates: 56°59′41″N 24°16′12″E

- Latvijas Etnogrāfiskais brīvdabas muzejs
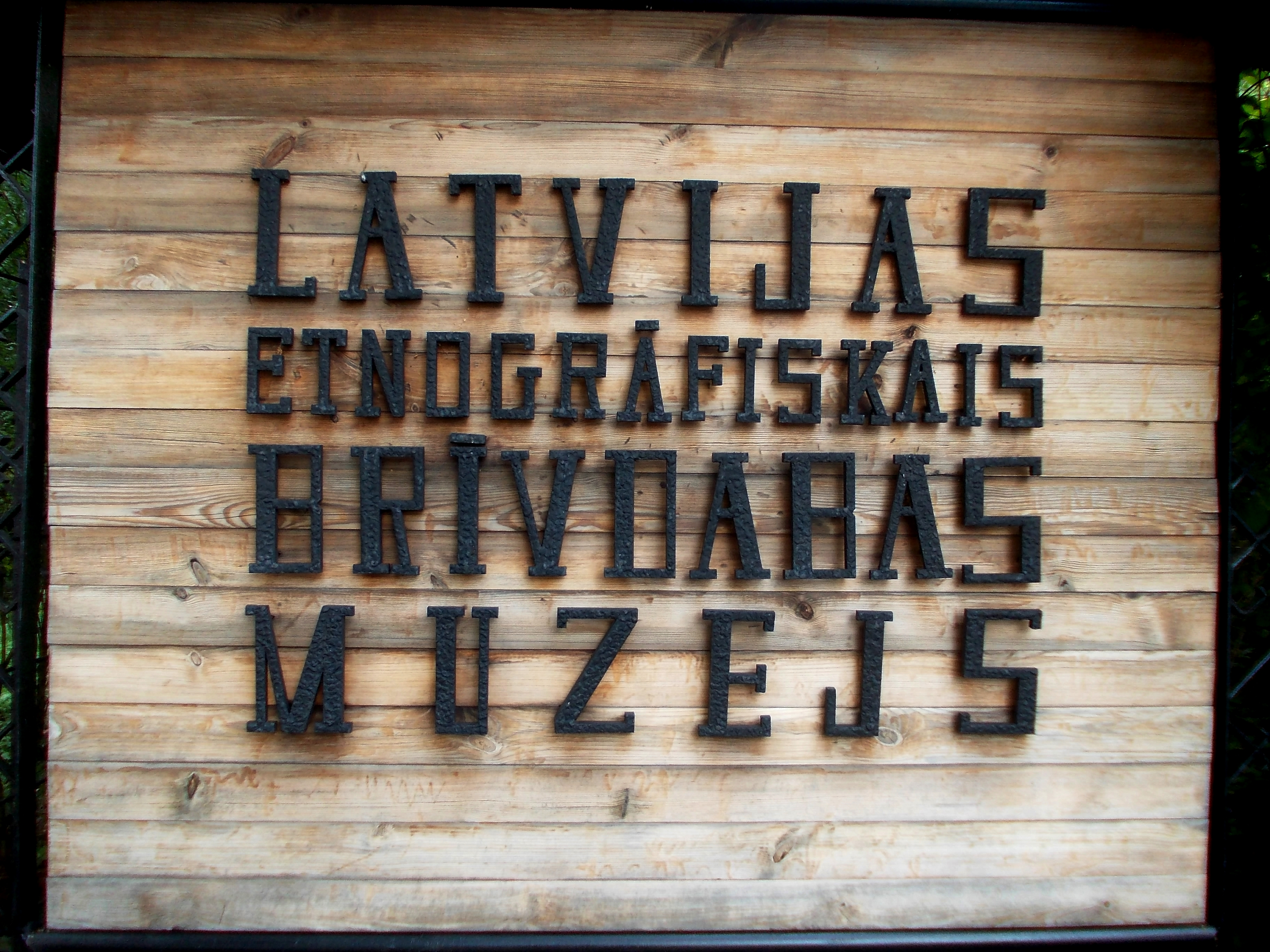
- Established: 1924
- Location: Berģi, Riga, Latvia
- Type: Open-air living museum
- Visitors: 120,000 visitors each year
- Director: Zanda Ķergalve
- Public transit access: City bus No.1
- Website: www.brivdabasmuzejs.lv/en/

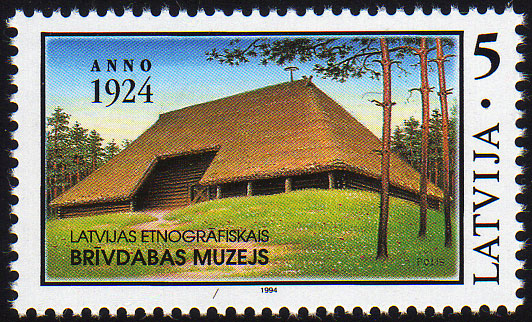
Latvian postage stamp issued 1994 to commemorate the 70th anniversary of the museum.

The Ethnographic Open-Air Museum of Latvia (Latvian: Latvijas Etnogrāfiskais brīvdabas muzejs) is an open-air museum located just outside Riga, the capital of Latvia, on the lightly wooded shores of Jugla Lake.

== History ==
In 1924, the Latvian Council of Monuments signed an order to create the open-air museum in Riga. The idea for the new museum was inspired by open-air museums in Scandinavia, particularly Skansen in Stockholm. The plan was to relocate a homestead from all four regions of Latvia – Kurzeme, Zemgale, Vidzeme and Latgale – to the museum. Each of the buildings would represent the different crafts of each area.

The new museum acquired land from a state land fund in the sandy dunes near Jugla Lake, just outside the city. In 1928, the first building, a barn from Vestiena parish was relocated and rebuilt in the museum. In 1932, the museum was opened to the public with six buildings (Vidzeme homestead). In 1939, there were already 40 buildings erected in the museum. Every region had its homestead and several other buildings of architectural or cultural value represented here. In the 1930s the museum became a very popular place and the community actively participated in the development of the museum. Several buildings were relocated and rebuilt, funded by private donations.

During World War II, the museum remained mostly undamaged, but most of its pre-war personnel were unavailable after having been repressed or forced into exile. Many documents were also lost during this period. During the Latvian SSR the museum was declared ideologically incorrect. Only in the late 1960s did the museum see a renaissance, when a new generation of museum specialists started to work in the museum. As communication with other countries was improved, the territory of the museum was expanded and many new and high-value objects were placed into the museum.

When Latvia regained its independence in 1991, the museum started actively collecting and documenting Latvian heritage from the 1920s and 1930s, a period during which Latvian agrarian reforms reshaped the Latvian countryside. As a result, a new complex of farmers' homesteads from the 1930s was opened in 1997.

== Today ==
Today, the museum organizes many cultural events, such as folk concerts and traditional and craft festivals. The museum promotes traditional Latvian culture and lifestyle with these cultural events. The annual traditional craft fair has been organized by the museum since 1971. The fair has become the museum's most famous annual event, attended by tens of thousands of people every year.

The museum currently occupies 87 hectares and displays 118 buildings, as well as more than 3,000 items. Most of Latvia's historical ethnic groups are represented in the museum. The museum's collection holds approximately 150,000 artifacts.

== Gallery ==
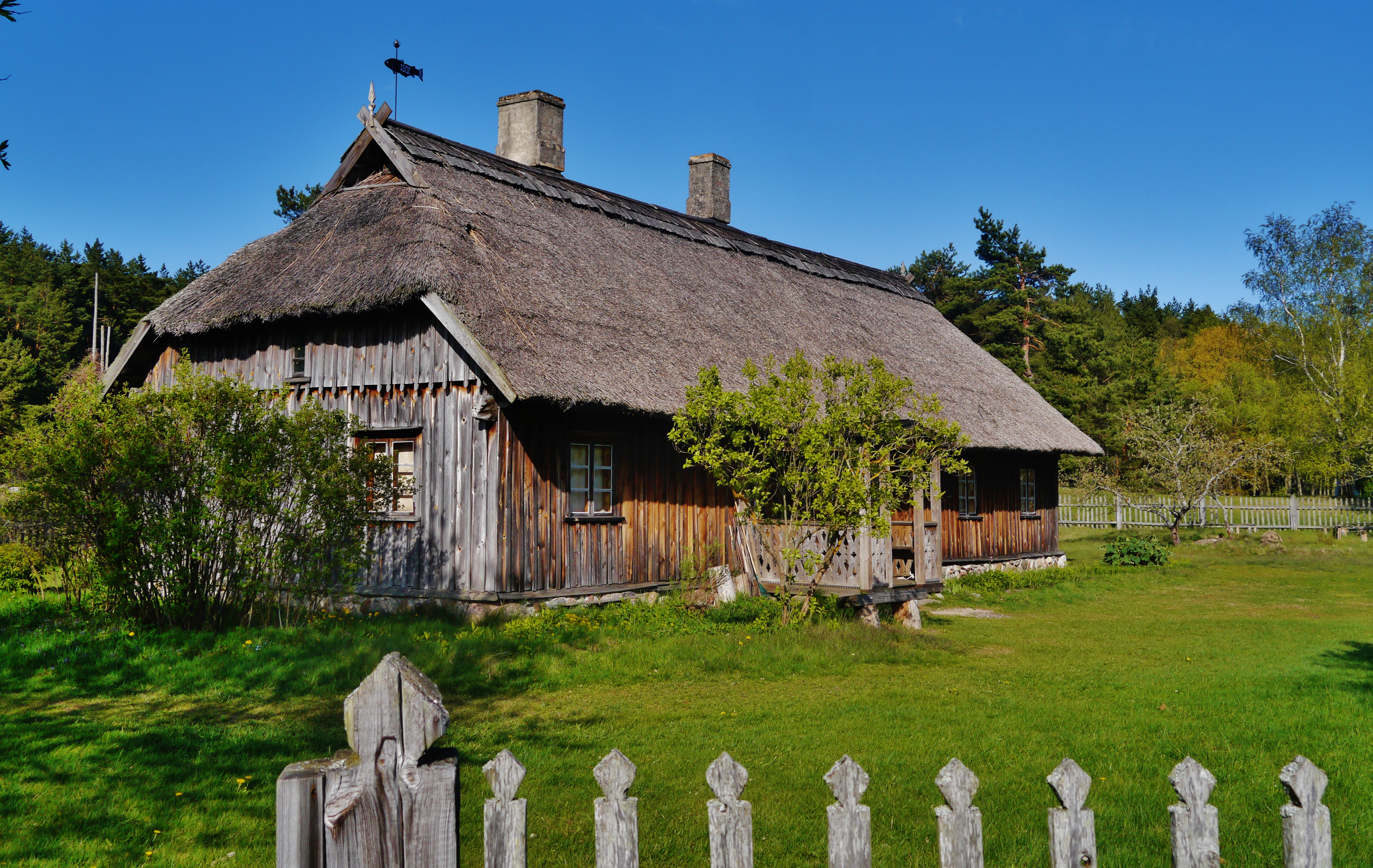
A fisherman's house (Lurķi) from the Rucava parish, Courland

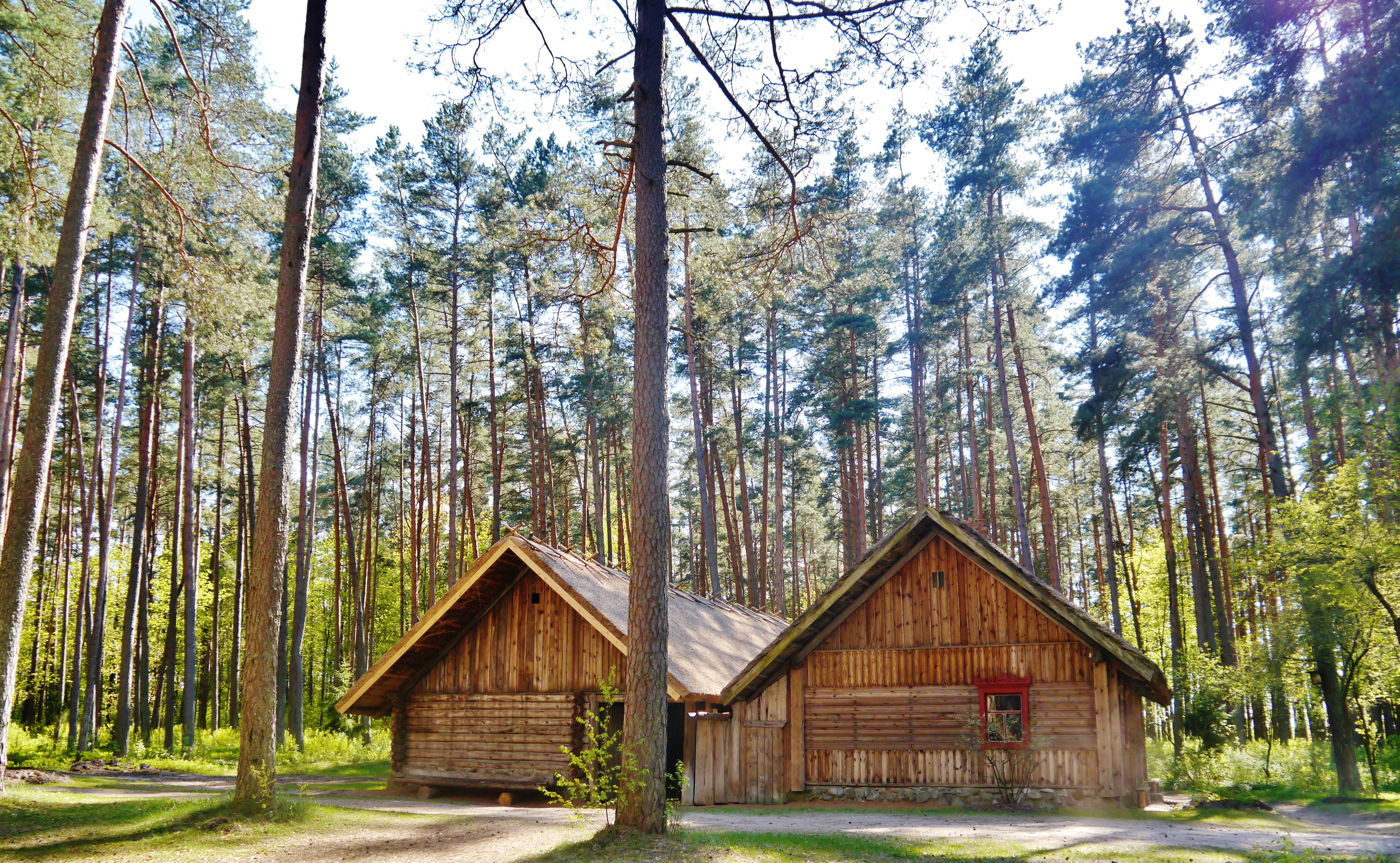
Home of a Russian peasant from Latgale

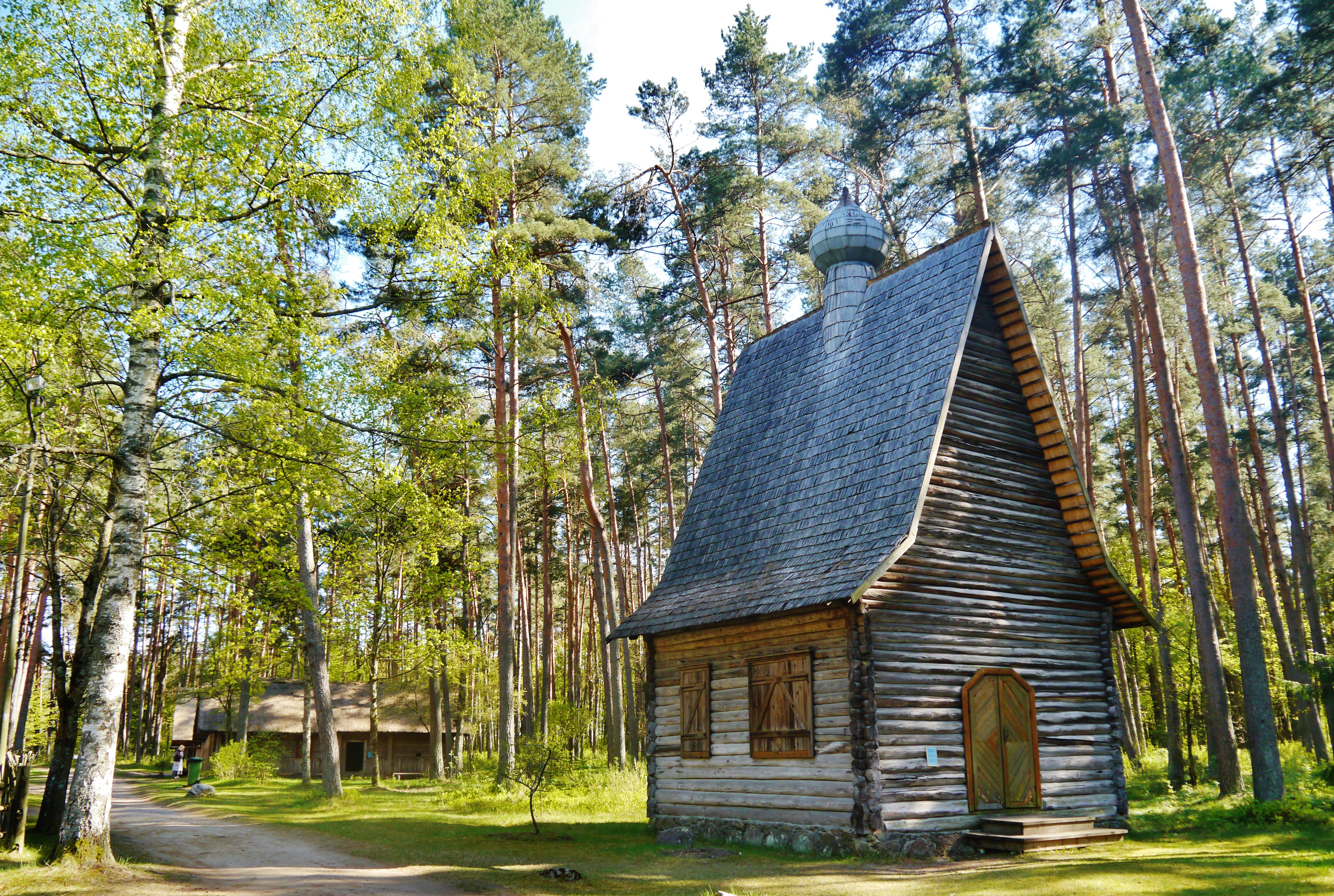
Russian Orthodox church from the Rogovka village, Latgale

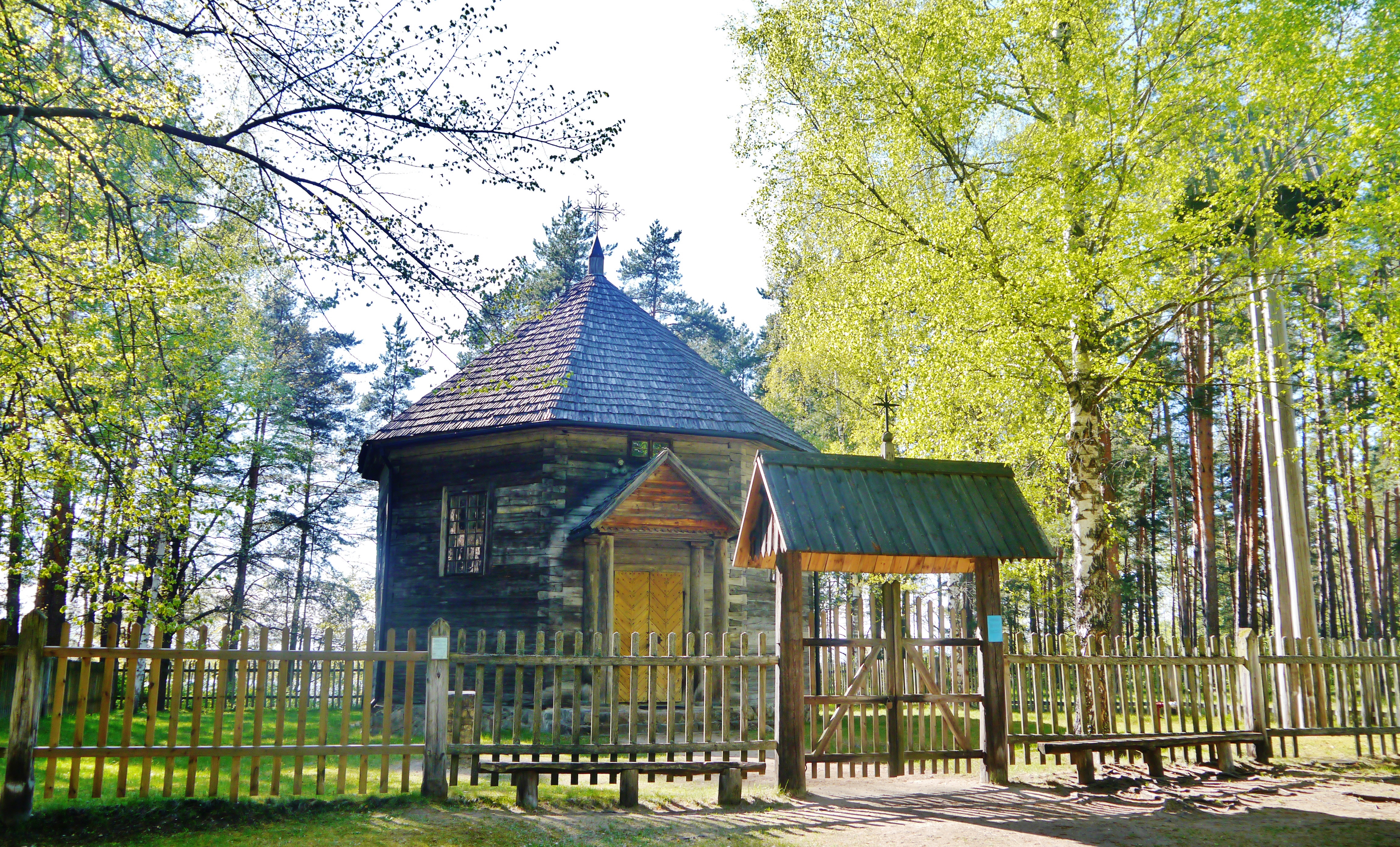
Roman Catholic chapel from Latgale

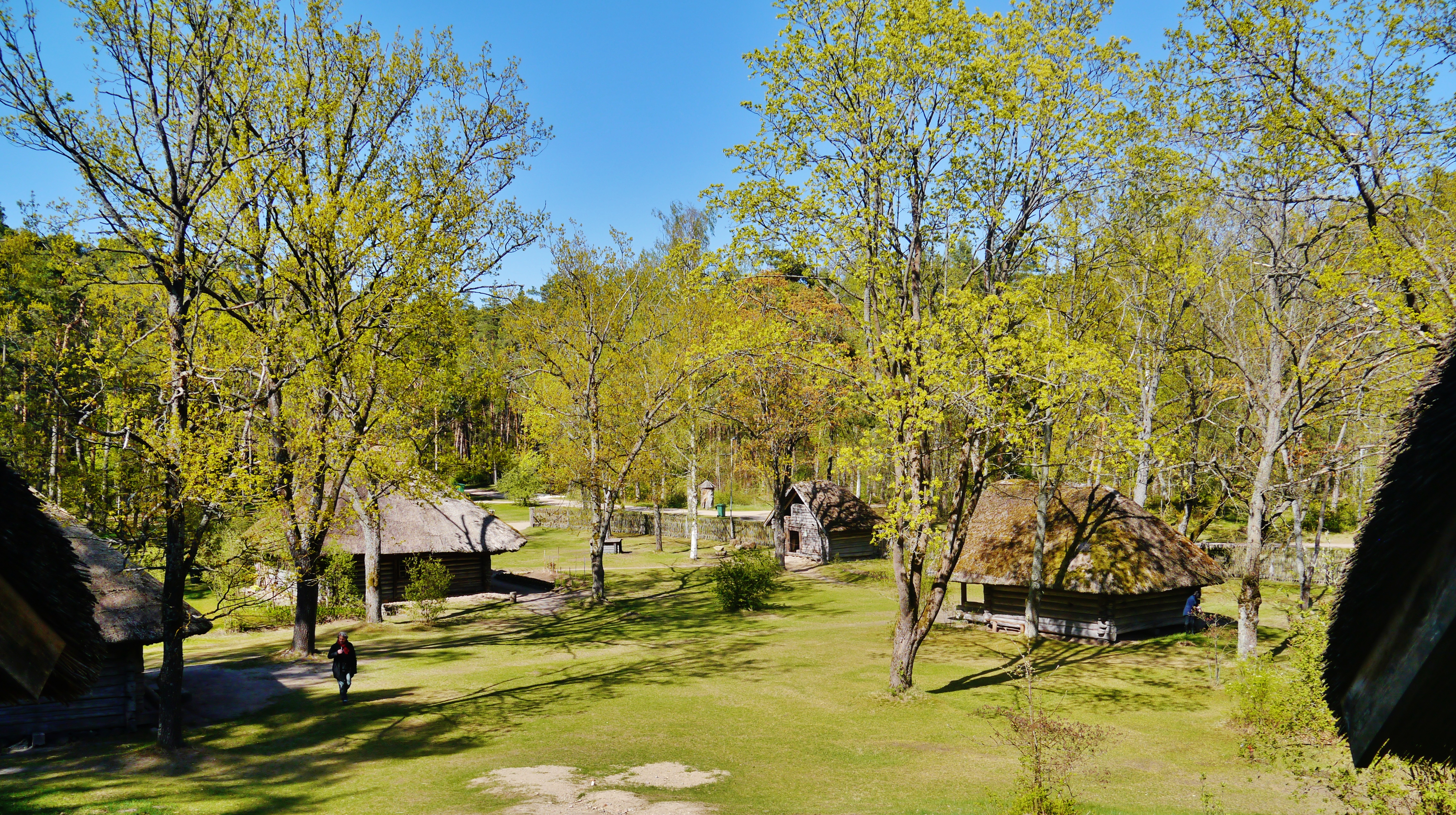
View of the buildings of Vidzeme homestead

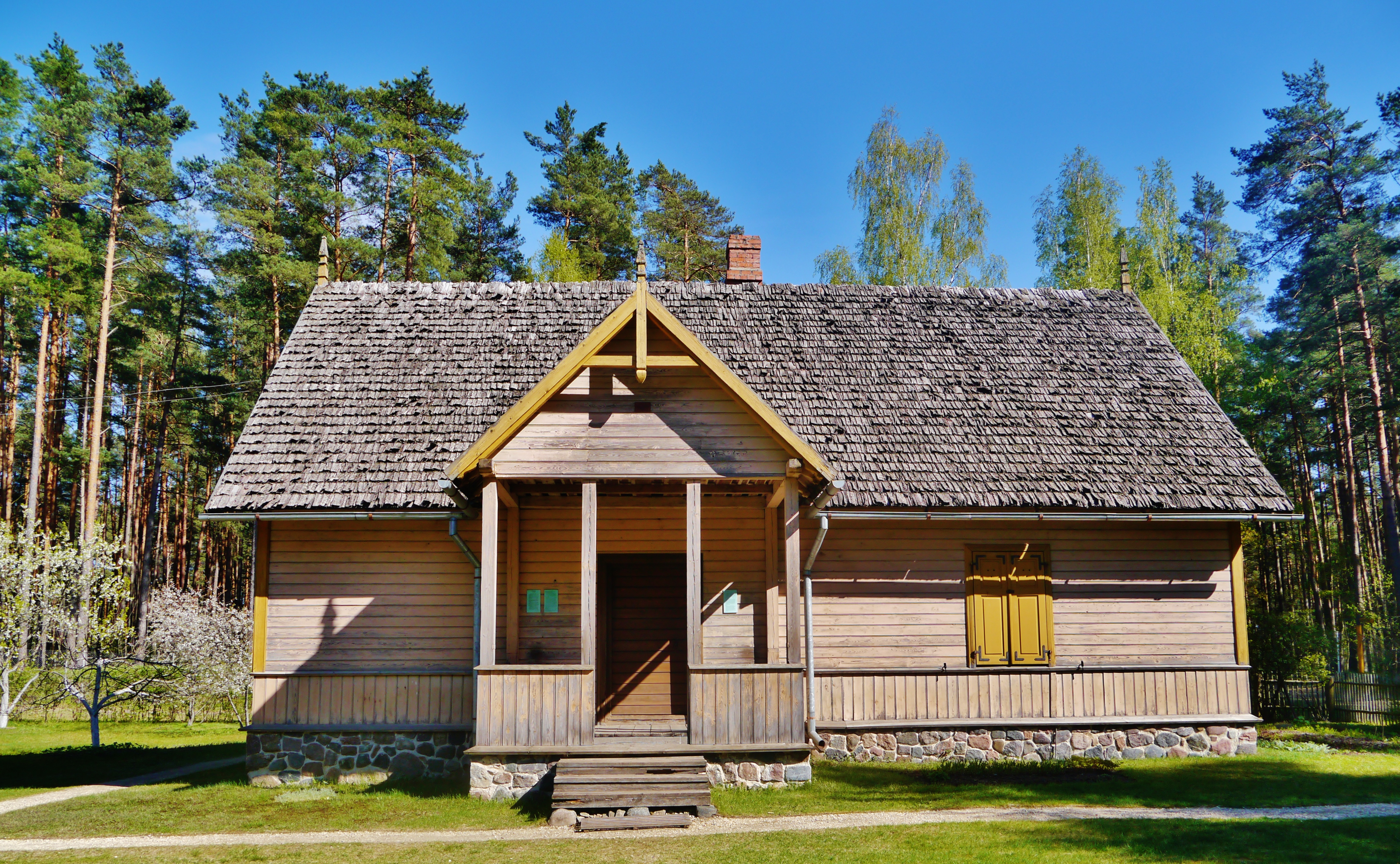
New Farmers dwelling house from the 1930s. Jaungulbene parish, Vidzeme

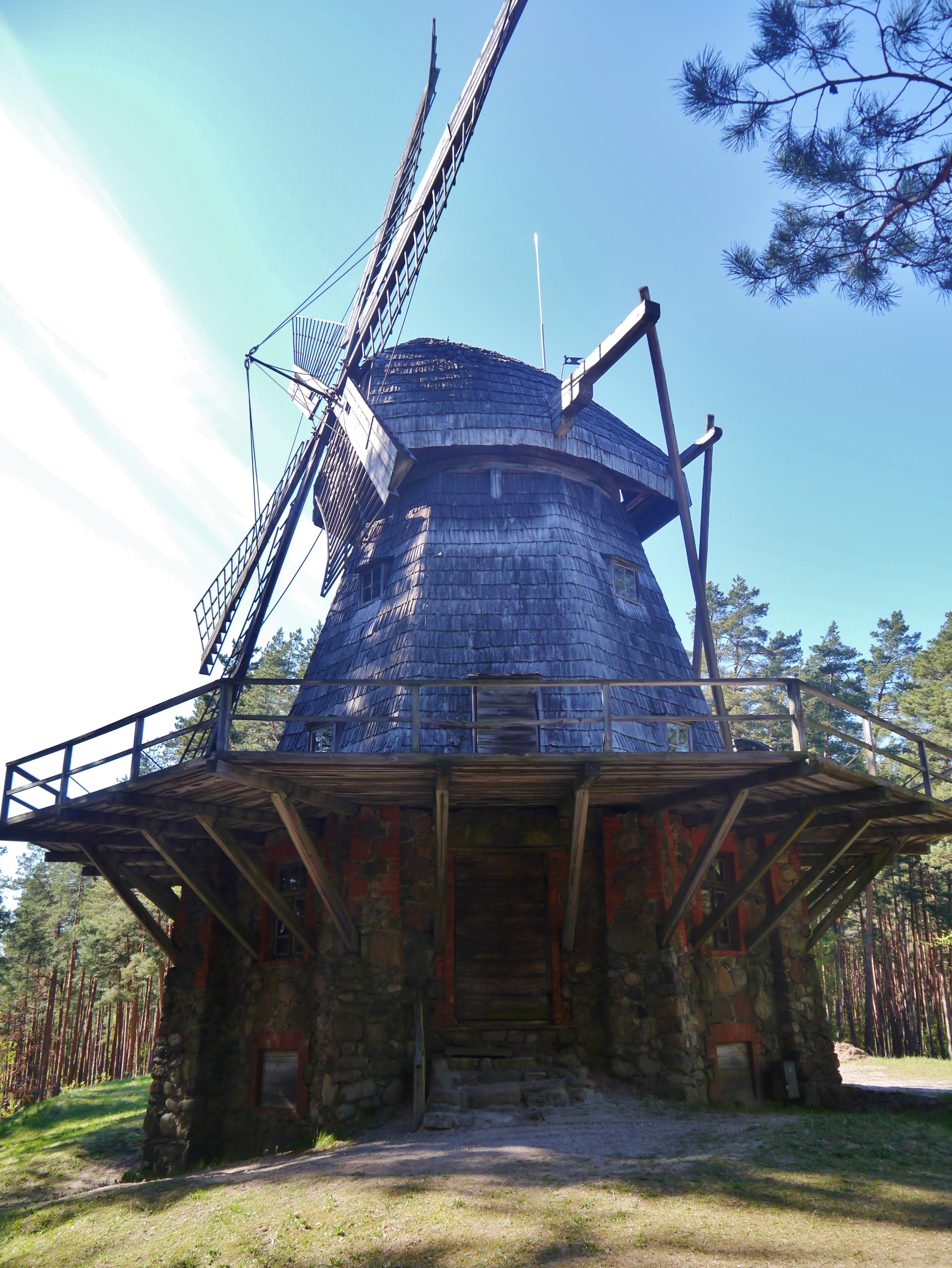
Windmill from the Rundēni parish, Latgale

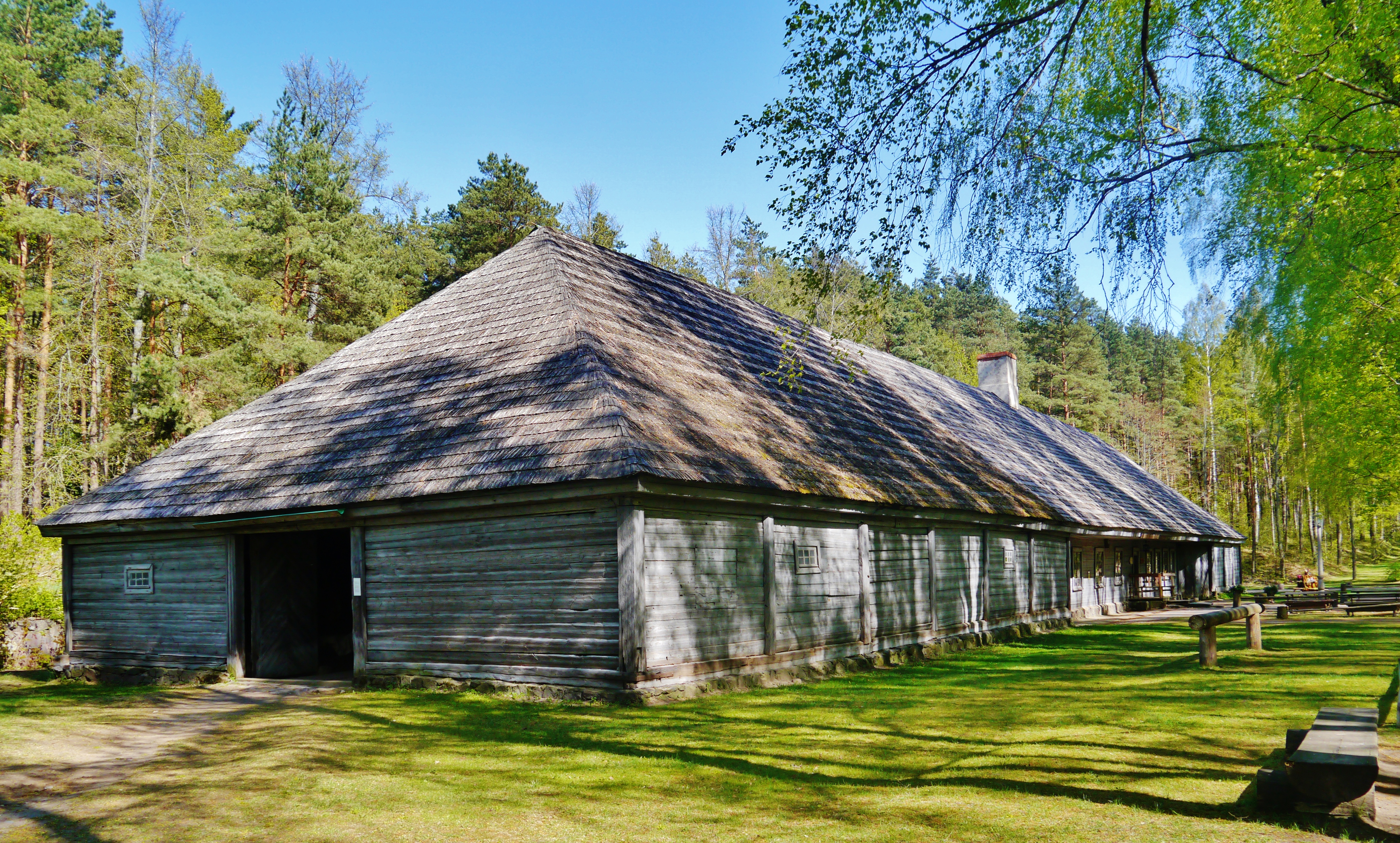
Tavern from the Vecumnieki parish, Zemgale

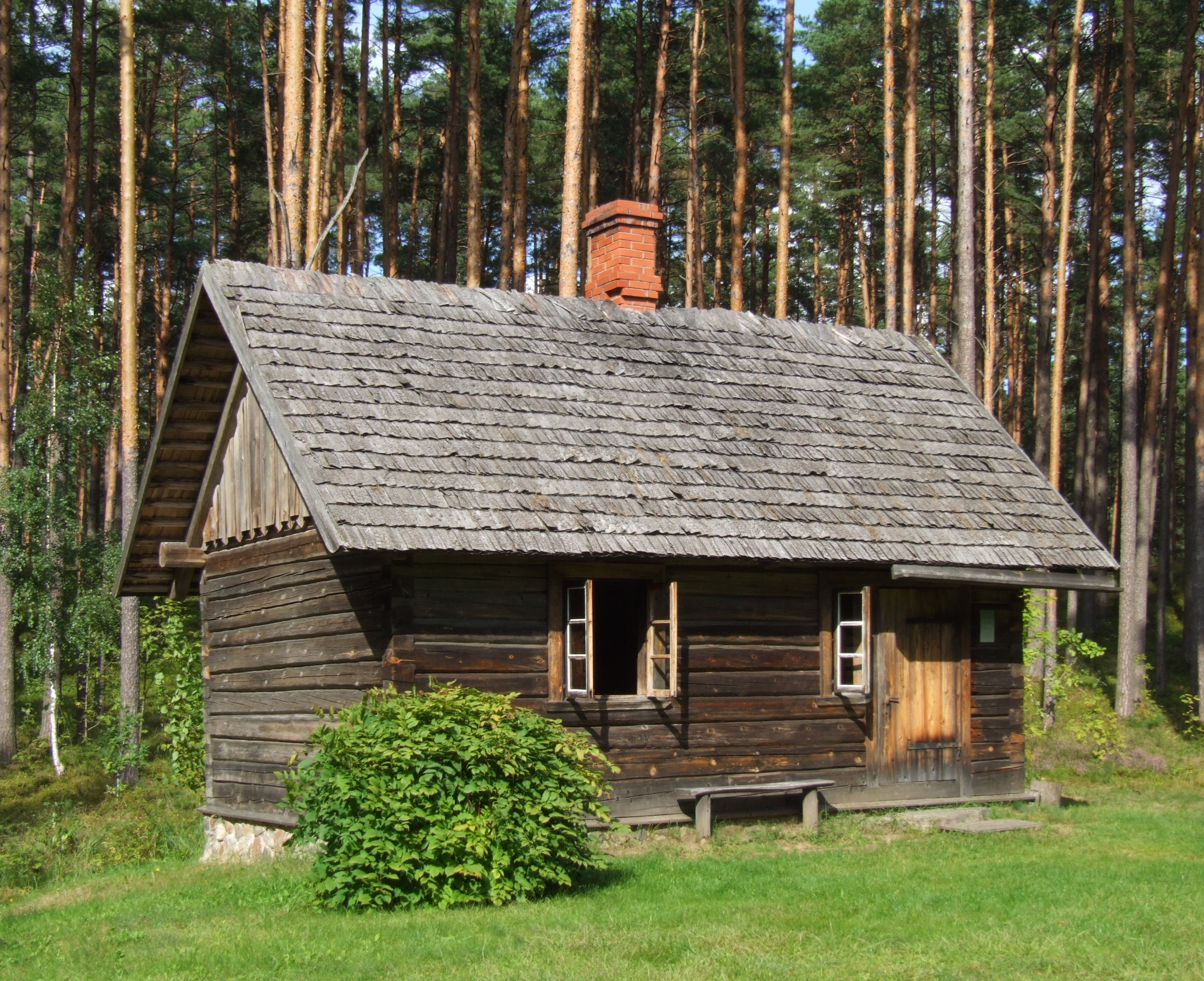
Bathhouse (Pirts) from Gaujiena parish, Vidzeme

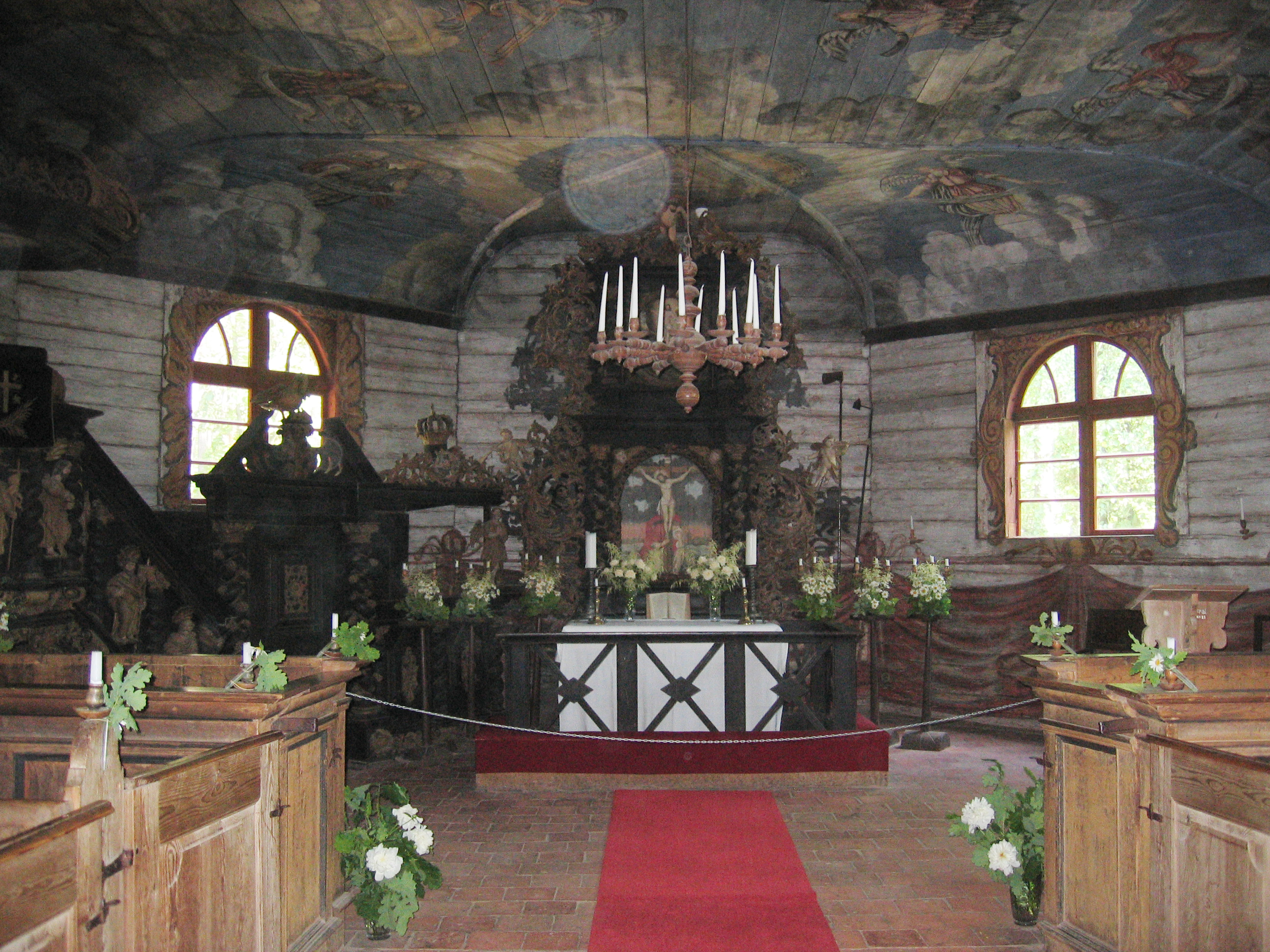
Interior of the Usma Lutheran Church
