= Queen Charlottes Gold Rush =

1851 gold rush in British Columbia, Canada

The Queen Charlottes Gold Rush was a gold rush in southern Haida Gwaii of what is now the North Coast of British Columbia, Canada, in 1851.

The rush was touched off in March 1851 when a Haida man traded a 27-troy-ounce (30 oz; 840 g) nugget in Fort Victoria for 1,500 blankets.

The crew of the Hudson's Bay Company vessel Una were the first to mine, discovering a vein 6.5 inches (170 mm) wide, 80 feet (24 m) long at 25% gold content. As the crew began blasting, Haida would rush into the blast site to gather gold, competing with the crew. The Haida, according to the ship's logbook, grabbed crewmen by the legs to prevent them from reaching the gold. Half the gold found was abandoned, along with the mine, to avoid bloodshed between the two parties, but each had taken in roughly $1,500 in gold ($60,000 in modern dollars) as the yield from three blasts. On her return voyage, Una was wrecked off Neah Bay and her gold lost. The Hudson's Bay Company, having no other ship available, did not attempt to mine in the Charlottes again.

Of several American ships to visit the Charlottes during the rush, the first, Georgiana, was wrecked on the east coast of the Charlottes and her crew taken captive by Haida. Her crew's freedom was bartered back by the next vessel to come northwards, which had put in at Mitchell Harbour but returned south to Olympia to refit for the return trip to rescue the Georgiana's crew (the Haida burned Georgiana herself).

In 1852, ten American ships came to the Charlottes in search of gold, but hostility from Haida throughout the islands made mining and prospecting difficult, and most actual mining was prevented. Among these ten vessels was the Susan Sturgis, which traded along the coast and at Skidegate was befriended by Chief Edenshaw, who joined the crew as guide and interpreter, bringing along with him some of his own men. Pulling into Masset Inlet to trade, the vessel was suddenly mass-boarded by the Masset Haida, who fought with Edenshaw and his few men who were trying to protect the crew. Word reached Chief Trader John Work at Fort Simpson in ten days and Work arrived to negotiate the release of Susan Sturgis's crew at the rate of $250 each for captain and mate, and $30 for each of the men (i.e. at the dollar equivalent in blankets). The vessel could not be saved because the Masset looted and destroyed her.

The total value of gold recovered from the wreck was reckoned to be in the range of three hundred dollars.

The rush was complicated by the fact that in 1851, the Queen Charlotte archipelago, though recognized by treaty as British, was as yet unincorporated as a formal possession or colony. With American ships converging on Mitchell Harbour (Mitchell Inlet) on Moresby Island, which was the main port for rush activity, the islands came to the attention of the British Colonial Office, which in 1853, appointed Vancouver Island Governor James Douglas as governor of a new Colony of the Queen Charlotte Islands. Colonial status arrived, however, long after the rush was over. The Queen Charlotte Colony, which effectively existed on paper only since the governor's power was barely exercised in the archipelago, was quietly absorbed into the Colony of British Columbia in 1858.

== See also ==
- Colony of Vancouver Island
- British Columbia gold rushes
- List of historical ships in British Columbia
- Colonial police action against the people of Haida Gwaii
