= Cariboo Runaway =

1976 young adult novel by Sandy Frances Duncan

- First edition cover (publ. Burns & MacEachern)
- Author: Sandy Frances Duncan
- Publication date: 1986

Cariboo Runaway is a young adult novel by Canadian writer Sandy Frances Duncan, published in 1976. Set in the Cariboo region of British Columbia during the Cariboo Gold Rush of 1864, the novel follows Elva Parkhurst, a young girl from Victoria who disguises herself as a boy in order to find her father after he disappears while prospecting in the Cariboo.

== The novel ==
The main character, 13-year-old Elva T. Parkhurst, discovers that her little brother, Tim, also known as Timothy Parkhurst, may have followed her aboard the famous S.S. Beaver, although this is left ambiguous. Elva is outraged but soon comes to accept Tim's choice because she starts to rely on his presence. Together, they face many obstacles and dangers, and discover that their father is in jail. It is up to the children to free their father.

The novel is frequently taught in elementary school units on the Gold Rush.
