= Tasu Sound =

Sound in British Columbia, Canada

Coordinates: 52°47′00″N 132°03′00″W

Tasu Sound is a large sound on the west coast of Moresby Island in the Queen Charlotte Islands of British Columbia, Canada. It has several smaller bodies of water within its reaches, including Gold Harbour, the location of Gold Harbour, British Columbia. Also on the shores of the sound is Tasu, a former iron mining town also known as Tasoo.
