= Tasu =

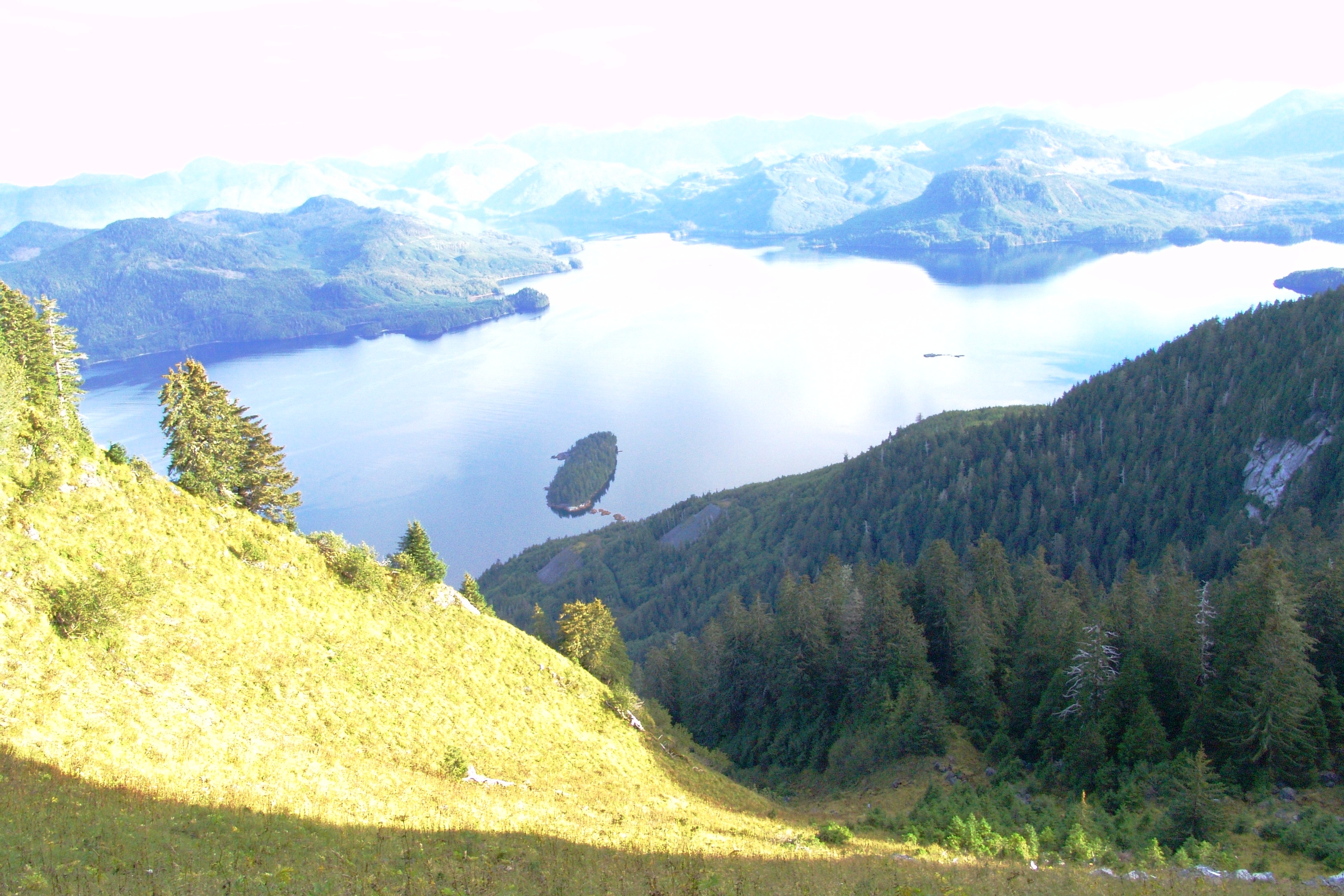
- The Tasu area in 2005

- Location of Tasu in British Columbia
- Coordinates: 52°45′49″N 132°02′00″W
- Country: Canada
- Province: British Columbia

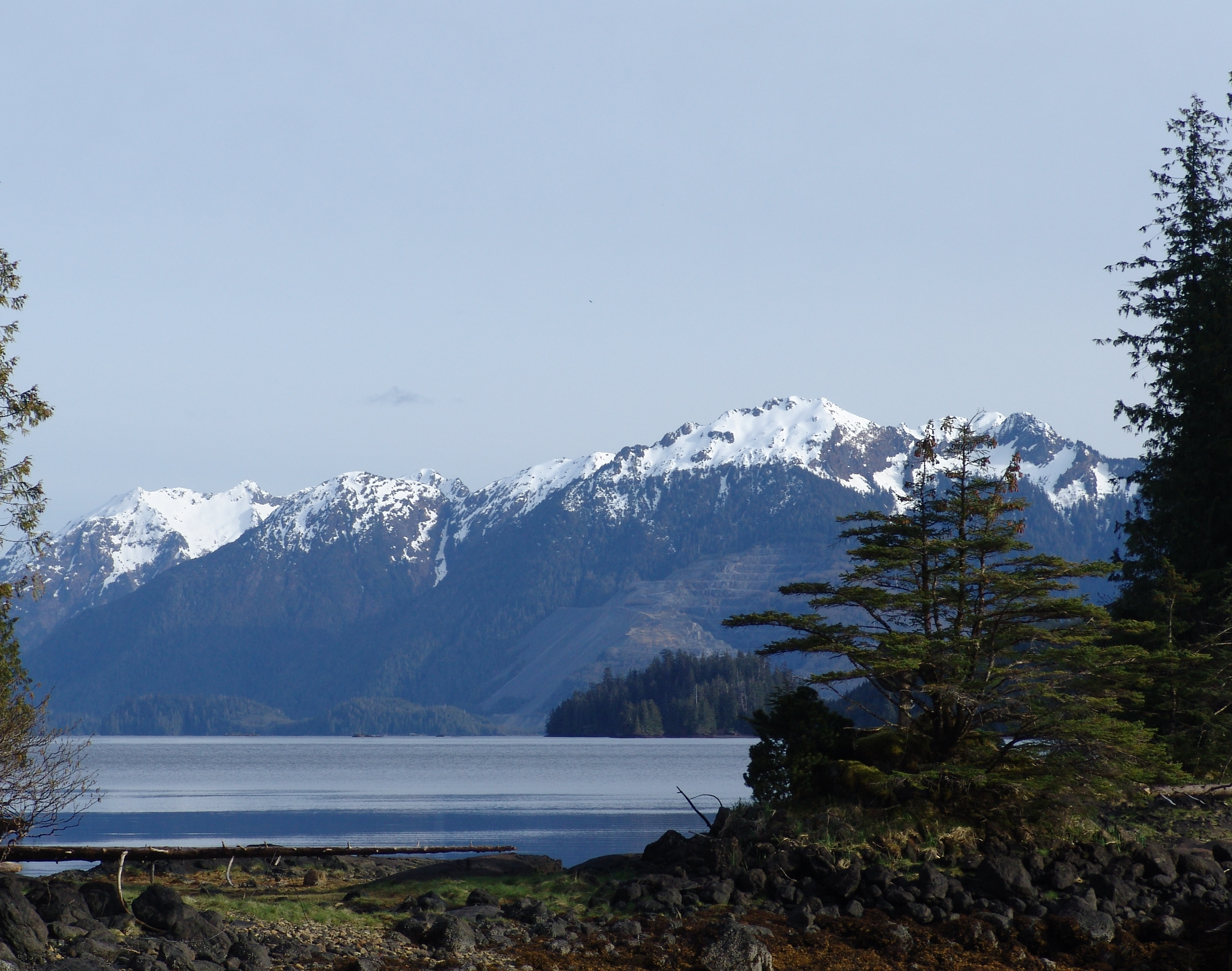
The Tasu mine site in May 2006, as seen from across the sound

Tasu or Tassoo, also Old Tasu or Old Tasu Townsite, was an iron and copper open pit and underground mining operation and townsite located on the south shore of Tasu Sound in west-central Moresby Island in the Haida Gwaii of the North Coast of British Columbia, Canada. It ran from 1918 until the early 1980s, with the townsite growing full size in the early 1960s. The early iron mine was owned and worked by Japanese miners, with the mine finishing operation as Wesfrob Mine, owned by Falconbridge Nickel Mines.

The Phyllis Cormack, a seiner, pulled into Tasu on its 1969 Greenpeace run to the Amchitka nuclear test.

== See also ==
- Tasu Water Aerodrome
- Gold Harbour, British Columbia
