= Keithley Creek, British Columbia =

Keithley Creek
- Location of Keithley Creek in British Columbia
- Coordinates: 52°46′00″N 121°25′00″W
- Country: Canada
- Province: British Columbia

Keithley Creek is a ghost town located in the Cariboo region of British Columbia. The town is situated near southwest end of Cariboo Lake, north of Quesnel Lake. The subdistrict of Keithley Creek had a population of 840 in 1891.
