= Brekši =

Neighbourhood of Riga, Latvia

Coordinates: 56.966363°N 24.303979°E

- Neighbourhood of Riga
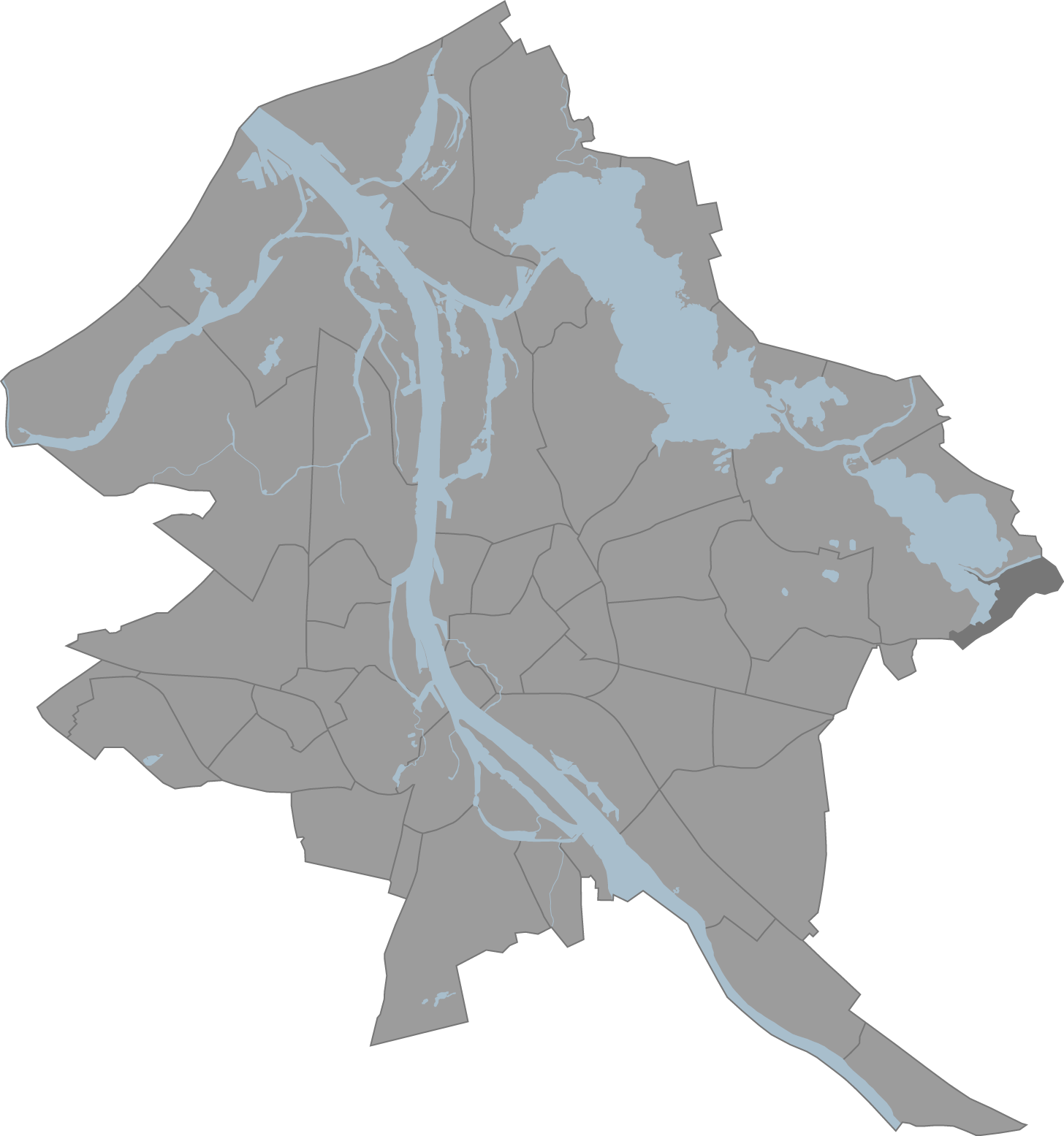
- Location of Brekši in Riga
- Country: Latvia
- City: Riga
- District: Vidzeme Suburb

Area
  - Total: 2.039 km^{2} (0.787 sq mi)

Population (2017)
  - Total: 1,722
  - Density: 844.5/km^{2} (2,187/sq mi)
- Postal code: LV-1024
- Website: apkaimes.lv

Brekši is a neighbourhood of Riga, the capital of Latvia.

The main touristic and historical sights of this neighbourhood include Juglas muiža and Brekšu muiža.
