= Colony of the Queen Charlotte Islands =

British colony

Coordinates: 53°15′00″N 132°15′00″W

- Colony of British North America
- 1853–1858
- Flag

Anthem
- God Save the Queen
- Capital: None – governance via Colony of Vancouver Island
- Government
  - Type: Colonial Administration
- Monarch
  - 1853–1858: Victoria
- Lieutenant Governor
  - 1853–1858: James Douglas
- History
  - Established: 1853
  - Disestablished: 1858
Preceded by	Succeeded by
Haida people	Colony of British Columbia (1858–1866)

The Colony of the Queen Charlotte Islands was a British colony constituting the archipelago of the same name from 1853 to 1858, when it was amalgamated into the Colony of British Columbia. In 2010, the archipelago was renamed Haida Gwaii.

The Queen Charlotte Colony was created by the Colonial Office in response to the increase of American marine trading activity resulting from the gold rush on Moresby Island in 1851. No separate administration or capital for the colony was ever established, as its only officer or appointee was James Douglas, who was simultaneously Governor of Vancouver Island. He was granted a commission as Lieutenant-Governor of the Queen Charlotte Islands in September 1852.

While the archipelago was ostensibly a British colony, historical evidence, such as a seasonal mission of exploration to survey the islands as late as 1859 does not support the establishment of a permanent European settlement following the unsuccessful conclusion to the gold rush in 1853.

Prior to and during its establishment as a nominative British colony, the archipelago was inhabited by groups of the Haida people, which comprised the sole population of the ostensible colony.

== See also ==
- Haida people
- Haida Gwaii
- Queen Charlottes Gold Rush

== Works cited ==
- Sage, Walter Noble (1930b). Sir James Douglas and British Columbia. Toronto: University of Toronto Press. doi:10.14288/1.0375702. OCLC 937565836 – via UBC Library Open Collections.

== See also ==
- Lillard, Charles. Just East of Sundown:The Queen Charlotte Islands.
- Sage, Walter Noble (1930a). Sir James Douglas. Ryerson Canadian History Readers. Toronto: The Ryerson Press. doi:10.14288/1.0374756. OCLC 422709642 – via UBC Library Open Collections.
