= Berģi =

Neighbourhood of Riga, the capital of Latvia

Coordinates: 56°59′N 24°18′E

- Neighbourhood of Riga
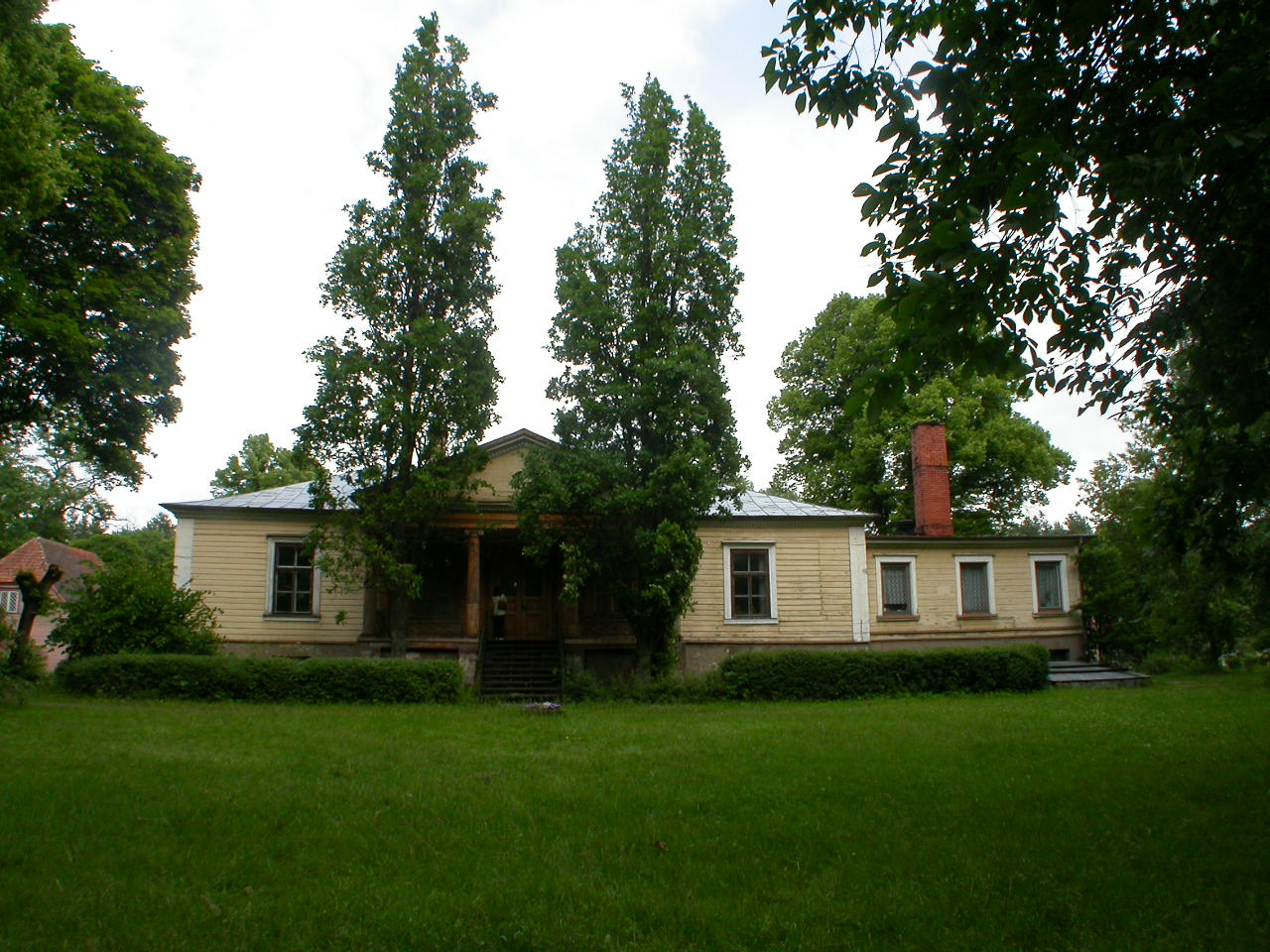
- Bonaventura Manor in Berģi

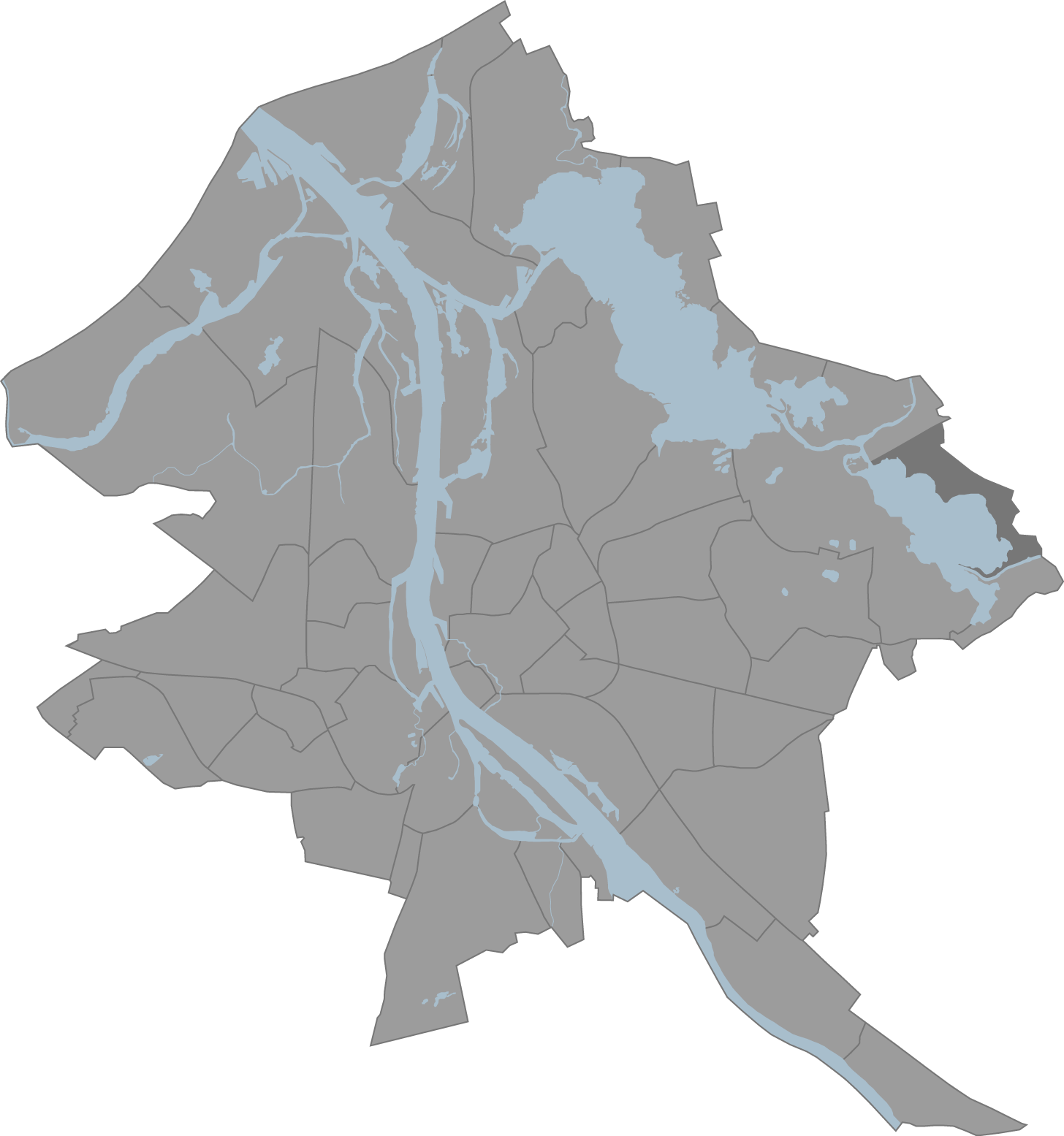
- Location of Berģi in Riga
- Country: Latvia
- City: Riga
- District: Vidzeme Suburb

Area
  - Total: 5.706 km^{2} (2.203 sq mi)

Population (2017)
  - Total: 2,950
  - Density: 517/km^{2} (1,340/sq mi)
- Postal code: LV-1024
- Website: apkaimes.lv

Berģi is a neighbourhood of Riga, the capital of Latvia.

The Ethnographic Open-Air Museum is located here.
