= Sandy Frances Duncan =

Canadian writer

- Born: 1942 (age 83–84); Vancouver, British Columbia, Canada
- Other name: Sandy Frances Mary Duncan
- Education: University of British Columbia
- Occupation: Writer
- Organizations: PEN International; Writers Union of Canada
- Awards: Finalist for the Sheila A. Egoff Children's Literature Prize in 2005

Sandy Frances Duncan is a Canadian writer of novels, mysteries, and short stories. Her novel Gold Rush Orphan was among the finalists for the Sheila A. Egoff Children's Literature Prize in 2005. She has contributed short fiction to anthologies, including Dropped Threads: What We Aren't Told and Celebrating Canadian Women, and to magazines including Makara, Northern Journey, and Canadian Fiction.

Duncan, born in Vancouver in 1942, holds bachelor's and master's degrees from the University of British Columbia. She worked as a psychologist at Woodlands School, New Westminster, British Columbia; Burnaby Mental Health Center in Burnaby, and for the Metropolitan Health Department in Vancouver before turning to writing full-time in 1973.

== Bibliography ==
=== Novels ===
- Cariboo Runaway (1976)
- Kap-Sung Ferris (1977)
- The Toothpaste Genie (1981)
- Dragonhunt (1981)
- Finding Home (1982)
- Pattern Makers (1989)
- Listen to Me, Grace Kelly (1990)
- British Columbia: Its Land, Mineral and Water Resources (1996)
- Gold Rush Orphan (2004)

=== Mysteries ===
Four novels, co-authored with George Szanto, comprise the Islands Investigations International Mysteries, as follows:

- Never Sleep with a Suspect on Gabriola Island (2009)
- Always Kiss the Corpse on Whidbey Island (2010)
- Never Hug a Mugger on Quadra Island (2011)
- Always Love a Villain on San Juan Island (2013)
