= Antler Creek =

Creek in the country of Canada

Coordinates: 53°15′30″N 121°24′39″W

Antler Creek is a creek located in the Cariboo region of British Columbia. The creek was discovered in 1860 by John Rose. The creek was mined and at one time produced $10,000 per day. The Sawmill flat area was considered the richest section. The creek has been drifted, hydraulicked, sluiced and hand mined.
