= Keithley Creek =

Coordinates: 52°44′51″N 121°25′11″W

Keithley Creek is a creek located in the Cariboo Region of British Columbia. The creek flows into Cariboo Lake from the west. It was discovered in 1860 by "Doc" Keithley. The creek has been hand mined and hydraulicked for gold.
