= Rock Creek Gold Rush =

Gold rush in British Columbia, Canada

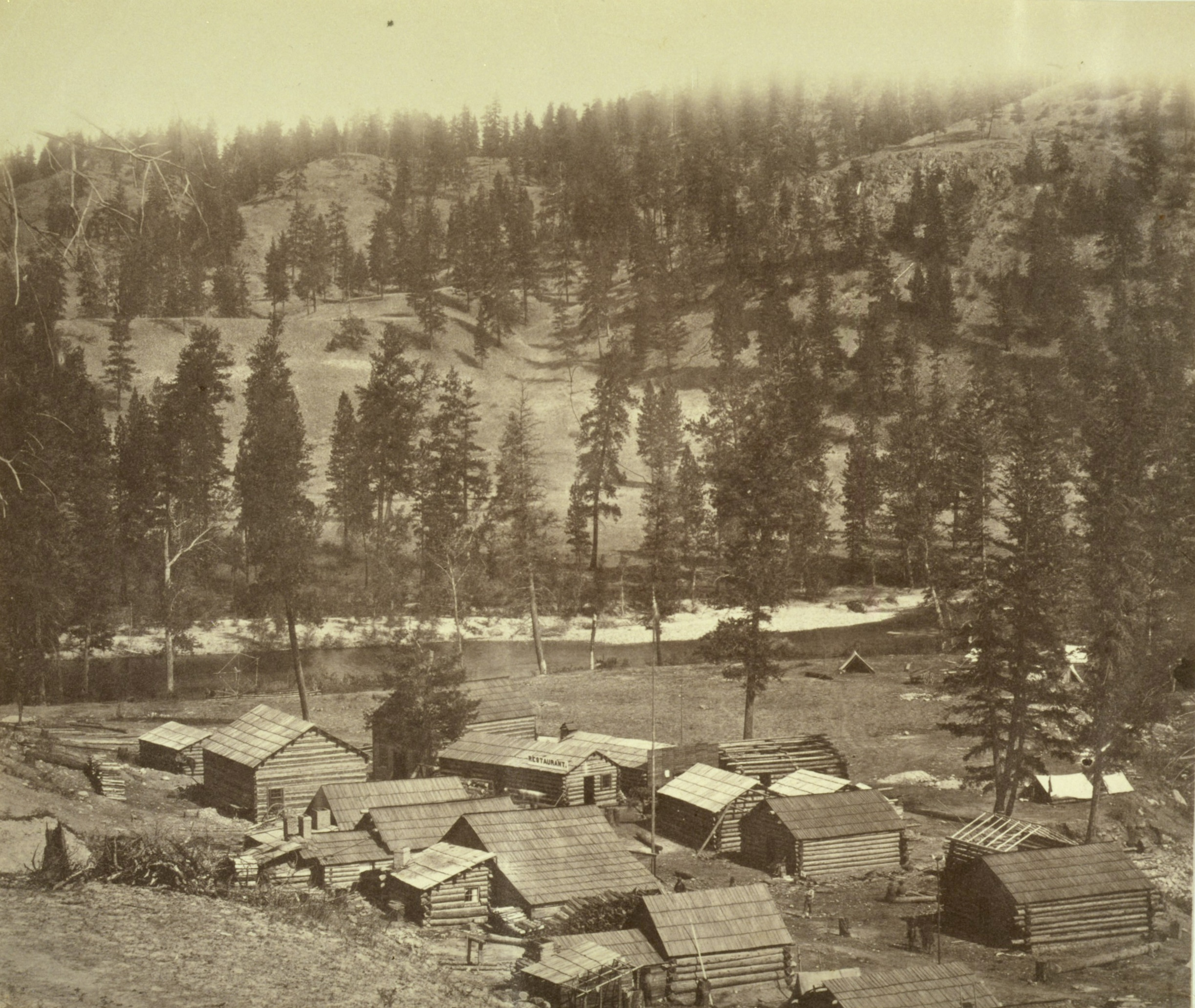
"Gold mining town of Rock Creek, British Columbia, 1860," leaf 33 from album British Northwest Boundary Commission and Related Subjects, 1859-1861 (Library of Congress)

The Rock Creek Gold Rush was a gold rush in the Boundary Country region of the Colony of British Columbia (now part of a Canadian province). The rush was touched off in 1859 when two US soldiers were driven across the border to escape pursuing Indians and chanced on gold only three miles into British territory, on the banks of the Kettle River where it is met by Rock Creek, and both streams turn east to where in times since developed the city of Grand Forks (so-named because of its location at the confluence of the Kettle and Granby). The first claim was filed by an Adam Beam (or Beame) in 1860, and the rush was on, composed mostly of Americans and some Chinese, all of whom had come overland from other workings, either at Colville or Oregon or all the way from California.

At its peak, an estimated 5,000 men were in the area, where the new town of Rock Creek had grown to a population of about 300, when trouble broke out between American and Chinese miners, and the efforts of the colony's Gold Commissioner Peter O'Reilly to end the disturbances, as well as to collect the Queen's mining licenses, resulted in him being driven from the mining camp by a hail of stones in what has become known to history as the Rock Creek War, as it was dubbed at the time by the Victoria newspapers.

== End of Rock Creek War ==
O'Reilly fled to Victoria and reported to Governor Douglas, who after a trip to Lillooet via Port Douglas and the Lakes Route, went on into Princeton (which on the way he named "Prince's Town", in honour of the Prince of Wales, visiting distant Canada at the time; also during this visit to Lillooet the Governor approved its residents' new name for the former Cayoosh Flat). Douglas, accompanied by W.G. Cox, who was to be new commissioner, and Arthur Bushby, most well known for being clerk and companion to Judge Begbie, proceeded to Rock Creek. Once he arrived, he admonished a meeting of 200 miners and told them if they didn't follow his orders, he would come back with 500 marines. As he had at Yale two seasons earlier, he also instructed them the Chinese had the same rights to the gold workings as any other, and further molestation of them would not be permitted. At the end of the meeting, he insisted on shaking each man's hand and looking them in the eye as they left the tent as a way of ingraining his personal expectations on each of them.

The workings on Rock Creek did not last many years, and when the Colville Gold Rush began soon after, many Americans went on to the new diggings and Rock Creek's gold-mining heyday became a memory. The troubles of this goldfield demonstrated that Douglas' determination to build a transportation and communication route between the Coast and the Interior was vital to the security of the colony, underscoring his contracting of Edgar Dewdney to build a trail from Fort Hope, British Columbia to the East Kootenay (where similar troubles had broken out). The purpose of the Dewdney Trail was to prevent draining the Interior's gold and other resources to the United States, as well as to be able to deploy troops should trouble break out and either Indian war or outright annexationist uprising should arise in areas where access to and through the United States was far easier than from the Coast.

== See also ==
- Gold rush
- Yakima War
- Colony of British Columbia
- British Columbia Gold Rushes (index)
- Fraser Canyon Gold Rush
- Fraser Canyon War
- McGowan's War
- Dewdney Trail
- Boundary Country
- Point Ellice Bridge Disaster
