= Gold Harbour, British Columbia =

Gold mine in Canada

- Type: Gold mine
- Location: Haida Gwaii, British Columbia, Canada
- Coordinates: 52°57′20″N 132°10′52″W
- Elevation: 0
- Website: BC MINFILE Record Summary

Gold Harbour was a historic gold and silver mine in Haida Gwaii, on the north coast of British Columbia, Canada. It is notable as the location of the first lode mine worked in what is now British Columbia.

The Hudson's Bay Company (HBC) became aware of gold in Haida Gwaii in 1849 or 1850. Samples of gold from Haida Gwaii were brought to the HBC fur trading post at Lax Kw'alaams, which at that time was called Fort Simpson by the HBC. John Work, who was in charge of the HBC post of Fort Simpson, had asked the fort's clientele to bring in samples of valuable minerals, and in response Haidas brought samples of gold to the fort. There are conflicting accounts of whom to credit with bringing this gold to Fort Simpson and to the attention of the HBC. Individuals credited in different accounts include:

- Albert Edenshaw, a Haida chief originally from Gatlinskun, a village near Cape Ball on the east coast of Graham Island in Haida Gwaii. He learned about it from an old Haida woman in Skidegate.
- An old Haida woman who traveled to Fort Simpson.
- The chief of Chaatl and his wife. This chief was named Nankilstas and was subsequently known as Captain Gold. Chaatl is a village relatively close to Gold Harbour.

The origin of the gold samples was identified as a vein of quartz at Una Point in Mitchell Inlet, and this location was named Gold Harbour. Mitchell Inlet is in the southern part of Englefield Bay on the west coast of Moresby Island in Haida Gwaii. The nearest major Haida village is Kaisun, also in Englefield Bay about 12 nautical miles to the northwest. The village of Chaatl is further to the north. The Haida settlement of Sqai'-tao was developed adjacent to Gold Harbour, likely in response to the short gold rush that followed.

Between 1850 and 1852, numerous expeditions by both the HBC and American vessels were made to Gold Harbour, the first by Captain Mitchell of the HBC. Some gold was removed, but the lack of any significant finds ended this short gold rush on Haida Gwaii. In 1853 Captain Prevost of HMS Virago reported that “The Queen Charlotte gold fever is at an end for ever, I think, we have twice circumnavigated the group (for there are three different islands) visiting each time 5 different harbours, and have never seen a white man, much less a vessel.”

Sporadic interest in Gold Harbour continued for years after the short gold rush, and various other attempts at mining the site are recorded. Between $5,000 and $75,000 in gold was taken out by Major W. Downie by 1859. The sixteen claims by then forming the property and owned by J. McLellan were bonded Nuba Mining in 1907 but the mine did not have a successful showing and the company surrendered its claims in 1912, with McLellan continuing his own work on the site until 1933. A good many Japanese nationals worked at this mine. In that year Gold Harbour Mining Limited milled tailings and a new cut and is reported to have recovered $179,000 in gold, but operations were suspended on December 13 of that year.

There is a National Historic Site of Canada named New Gold Harbour Area. However, the Parks Canada website lists the location of this site as the Haida village of Haina. New Gold Harbour is an alternate name for Haina, a village on Maude Island near Skidegate that was settled in the 1870s by Haidas from the Gold Harbour area. If the Parks Canada website is correct, this National Historic Site is not related to the Gold Harbour mine site.
