= List of Croatian Americans =

This is a list of notable Croatian Americans, including both original immigrants who obtained American citizenship and their American descendants.

To be included in this list, the person must have a Wikipedia article showing they are Croatian American or must have references showing they are Croatian American and are notable.

== Academics ==
- Mladen Bestvina – mathematician
- Jakša Cvitanić – professor of mathematical finance
- William Feller – mathematician
- Gordana Matic – mathematician
- Emil M. Mrak – food scientist, microbiologist and former chancellor of the University of California, Davis
- Vladimir Parpura – neuroscientist
- Drazen Prelec – mathematician
- Pasko Rakic – neuroscientist
- David Sanjek – professor of music
- Marin Soljačić – professor of physics at MIT
- Henry Suzzallo – president of the University of Washington
- Victor Wickerhauser – mathematician

== Artists ==
- Ivan Meštrović – sculptor and professor at Syracuse and Notre Dame
- Anton Perich – filmmaker, photographer and video artist
- Michael Trcic – sculptor and special effects artist
- Maksimiljan (Makso) Vanka – painter
- Matthew Yuricich – Academy Award-nominated special effects artist
- Richard Yuricich – three-time Academy Award-nominated special effects artist

== Entertainers ==
=== Actors ===
- Eric Bana – actor
- George Beban – actor, singer
- George Birimisa – playwright, actor, editor, director
- Anna Chlumsky – actress
- Al Christy – actor
- Claire Dubrey – actress (father was from Dalmatia)
- Ryan Eggold – actor (his mother is of half Croatian and half Austrian-Jewish ancestry)
- Jenna Elfman – television and movie actress (of partial Croatian descent; niece of Tony Butala)
- Josip Elic – actor
- Judah Friedlander – actor and comedian (mother of Croatian descent)
- Ryan Kiera Armstrong - actress (Croatian mother, Berta Bacic)
- Mira Furlan – television and film actress
- Jay Grdina – pornographic film actor
- Gloria Grey – actress and director
- Damian Hurley - actor
- John Malkovich – actor (father of Croatian descent)
- Joe Manganiello – actor (mother of Croatian descent)
- Mark Matkevich – actor
- Ivana Miličević – actress
- John Miljan – actor
- Daniella Monet (née Zuvic) - actress, entrepreneur, singer and television personality
- Patrick Muldoon – actor (mother of Croatian descent)
- Rick Rossovich – actor (father of Croatian descent; brother of Tim Rossovich)
- Tim Rossovich – actor (father of Croatian descent; brother of Rick Rossovich)
- Mia Slavenska – prima ballerina of the Metropolitan Opera Ballet
- Goran Višnjić – Croatian actor; became naturalized U.S. citizen
- Louis Zorich – actor, musician

=== Screenwriters, directors, producers and film workers ===
- Christina Cindrich – television producer and actress
- Michael Jelenic – American animator, storyboard artist, screenwriter, producer, and director.
- Branko Lustig – movie producer, two-time Academy Award winner
- Sergio Mimica-Gezzan – Croatian-born American director, second unit director, assistant director, producer and actor
- Marty Pasetta – television producer and director
- Frank Pavich – film director

=== Musicians ===
- Thana Alexa – (born Thana Alexa Pavelić) American jazz vocalist
- Nenad Bach – recording artist, composer, performer, producer and peace activist
- Tony Butala – co-founder and member of the singing group The Lettermen (uncle of actress Jenna Elfman)
- Dillon Francis – American electronic musician, record producer and DJ
- Alex Katunich – founding bassist of Incubus
- Jim Korthe (1970–2010) – singer
- Stephen Kovacevich – pianist and conductor
- Katrina Leskanich – singer
- Radoslav Lorković is a Croatian-born American based classically trained folk and blues musician on accordion and piano
- Clair Marlo (born Clara Veseliza) – singer-songwriter, composer, record producer
- Željko Marasović – composer of classical and film music
- Miljenko Matijevic – musician
- Johnny Mercer – singer-songwriter (mother of Croatian and Irish descent)
- Helen Merrill – jazz singer
- Zinka Milanov – operatic soprano
- Tomo Miličević – musician, guitarist
- Paul Mirkovich – musical director (The Voice)
- Joey Miskulin is an American accordionist and member of western music and comedy group Riders in the Sky
- Guy Mitchell – singer and actor
- Steve Novosel - jazz bass bassist
- Krist Novoselic – musician, bassist. Founding member of rock band Nirvana (band)
- David Paich – composer, producer and keyboardist
- Marty Paich – pianist, composer, arranger, record producer, music director, and conductor
- Walter Parazaider – founding member and saxophone player
- Tristan Perich – contemporary composer and sound artist
- Steve Popovich – record producer
- Plavka – singer
- Paul Salamunovich – conductor, brother of producer Mike Salamunovich
- Hillel Slovak - founding guitarist of the Red Hot Chili Peppers. His father was Jewish Croatian.
- Louis Svećenski – violinist
- Milka Ternina – operatic soprano
- "Weird Al" Yankovic – musician and actor. His father is of Croat and Slovenian descent.

== Military personnel ==
- Sylvester Antolak – US Army Sergeant, recipient of the Medal of Honor
- Paul William Bucha – US Army Captain, recipient of the Medal of Honor; highly decorated American Vietnam War veteran; foreign policy adviser to Barack Obama's 2008 presidential campaign
- Norman Cota – US Army Major General in World War II
- Louis Cukela – double recipient of the Medal of Honor
- Albert A. Francovich – Navy Cross recipient
- Rade Grbitch – US Navy, recipient of the Medal of Honor
- Ron Kovic – US Marine Corps, Vietnam War veteran; peace activist
- Richard Marcinko – US Navy SEAL commander and Vietnam War veteran
- Michael J. Novosel – US Army Chief Warrant Officer, recipient of the Medal Of Honor; veteran of World War II, Korean War, and Vietnam War
- Ivan L. Slavich Jr. – US Army colonel
- Peter Tomich – US Navy Chief Watertender, World War II recipient of the Medal of Honor
- John J. Tominac – US Army First Lieutenant, recipient of the Medal of Honor
- Albert Vadas – US Navy, recipient of the Medal of Honor
- Donald W. Wolf – Navy Cross recipient

== Politicians ==
- Michael D. Antonovich – Los Angeles County Supervisor, 5th District, nine terms from 1980 to 2016 (second longest tenure in Los Angeles County history); former California State Assemblyman for six years (Republican)
- Mark Begich – one-term U.S. Senator from Alaska; former mayor of Anchorage, Alaska (Democrat)
- Nick Begich – U.S. Representative (D-AK; 1971–1972) (Democrat)
- Nick Begich III, member of US Congress, Alaska (Republican)
- Michael Bilandic – Illinois politician; Mayor of Chicago (Democrat)
- John Bonacic – New York State Senator (Republican)
- John Cherberg – politician, football coach, teacher and television executive
- Renee Ellmers – U.S. Representative (R-NC; 2011–2017); mother of partial Croatian descent
- Frank Ivancie – Portland City Council; Mayor of Portland, Oregon (1980–1985) (Democrat)
- John Kasich – former member of U.S. House of Representatives (Ohio) and Governor of Ohio from 2011 to 2019 (Republican); mother of Croatian descent
- Dennis Kucinich – former mayor of Cleveland; member of U.S. House of Representatives (D-Ohio); 2004 Democratic presidential candidate
- Tony P. Mardesich – Washington State Representative from 1949 to 1950 (Democrat)
- August P. Mardesich – Washington State Representative from 1950 to 1963 (Democrat)
- Mary Matalin – political commentator, strategist and pundit; assistant to U.S. President George W. Bush (Republican)
- George W. Milias – California State Assemblyman from 1962 to 1970 (Republican)
- Rose Perica Mofford – 18th governor of Arizona from 1988 to 1991 (Democrat)
- Emil Mrkonic – former member of the Pennsylvania State House of Representatives (Democrat)
- Tony Peraica – Cook County Commissioner for the 16th district; nominee for Cook County Board President in 2006 (Republican)
- Rudy Perpich – former governor, lieutenant governor, and United States Senator from Minnesota (Democrat)
- George Radanovich – businessman (vintner); California politician; former member of U.S. House of Representatives (Republican)
- Mark Sokolich – politician; Mayor of Fort Lee, New Jersey (Democrat)
- Michael A. Stepovich – politician; last governor of the Alaska Territory from 1957 to 1958 (Republican)
- Rudy Svorinich – Los Angeles City Councilman and Council President Pro Tempore representing the 15th (Greater Harbor Area) district from 1993 to 2001 (Republican)
- Vincent Thomas – represented San Pedro's 68th and 52nd Districts in the California State Assembly from 1941 to 1979 (Democrat)
- Carmen Trutanich – Los Angeles City Attorney from 2009 to 2013 (Independent)
- Andy Vidak – California State Senator for 16th district → then 14th district (Republican)

== Scientists, inventors and engineers ==
- Lada Adamic – network scientist
- Ralph S. Baric – epidemiologist
- Tanja Bosak – geobiologist
- Milislav Demerec – geneticist
- Anthony Francis Lucas – oil explorer; inventor; organized with Pattillo Higgins the drilling of an oil well near Beaumont, Texas that became known as Spindletop, which led to the widespread exploitation of oil and the start of the petroleum age
- Daniel Gajski – computer scientist
- Anthony Grbic – electrical engineer
- Victor Grinich – one of the "traitorous eight" who founded Silicon Valley
- Terry Jonathan Hart – former astronaut
- Hedvig Hricak – radiologist
- Brian Krzanich – CEO, Intel
- Ferdo Ivanek – electrical engineer
- Branka Ladanyi – physical chemist
- John M. Martinis – physicist, 2025 Nobel prize winner
- John Miscovich – inventor
- Egon Matijevic – chemist
- Jacob Matijevic, Ph.D. – NASA engineer, posthumously, NASA named a hill on Mars after him
- Igor Mezić – mechanical engineer and mathematician
- Paul L. Modrich – biochemist, 2015 Nobel Prize Winner
- Steven Z. Pavletic – NIH medical doctor, cancer researcher
- Hrvoje Petek – physicist
- Stephen Polyak – neuroanatomist
- Andrija Puharich – medical and parapsychological researcher, medical inventor
- Mario Puratić – inventor of the fishing Puretic power block
- Mark Russinovich – Microsoft technical fellow
- Nikola Rušinović – physician, psychiatrist and wartime diplomat of the Independent State of Croatia
- Nenad Sestan – neuroscientist
- Vincent Sarich – chemist, anthropologist
- Branimir Ivan Sikic – medical doctor
- Jadranka Skorin-Kapov – operations research scientist
- George M. Skurla – aeronautical engineer for the Apollo program, director of operations at the Kennedy Space Center, former president of the Grumman Corporation
- Marin Soljačić – Ph.D. professor of physics, electrical engineer at MIT; inventor
- Davor Solter – biologist
- James Spudich – biochemist

== Sportspeople ==
- John Abramovic – former basketball player
- Cameron Johnson, NBA player
- Travis Kelce, NFL player
- Jason Kelce, NFL player
- Greg Dulcich, NFL player
- Mario Ančić – in legal department of the NBA; former professional tennis player, once ranked No. 7 in the world
- Marijon Ancich – football coach in California
- Johnny Babich – former baseball player
- Gary Beban – former NFL player, 1967 Heisman Trophy winner
- Bill Belichick – NFL football head coach; six-time Super Bowl winner with the New England Patriots
- Steve Belichick – football player
- Pete Bercich – former NFL player and coach with the Minnesota Vikings; currently the color commentator on KFAN radio
- Scott Boras – sports agent
- Nick Burley, born Nicholas Barovich – bare-knuckle boxer, Heavyweight Champion of the Yukon Territory in 1902
- Pete Carroll – Super Bowl-winning coach, Seattle Seahawks; former USC football coach
- Tom Cecic – US National Soccer Team player
- Ann Cindric – All-American Girls Professional Baseball League player
- Ralph Cindrich – former NFL player
- Fred Couples – golfer (Croatian mother)
- Helen Crlenkovich – diver, actress
- Lou Cvijanovich – California High School coach, only coach who won CIF titles in three different sports
- Johnny Damon - MLB player, won two World Series rings
- David Diehl – former football player and offensive lineman in the National Football League (Croatian mother)
- Duje Dukan – NBA basketball player
- Bill Fralic – former professional American football offensive guard
- Gary Gabelich
- Elvis Grbac – former NFL quarterback
- Bobby Grich – former MLB player
- Tom Haller – former MLB player
- John Havlicek – Naismith Memorial Basketball Hall of Fame (Croatian mother)
- Frankie Hejduk – US National Soccer Team player and member of the Columbus Crew
- Les Horvath – 1944 Heisman Trophy winner and former NFL quarterback
- Iva Jovic – tennis player
- Ed Jurak – former MLB player
- Al Jurisich – former MLB player
- John Jurkovic – former NFL player
- Mirko Jurkovic – former football player
- Mike Karakas – NHL hockey player
- David Kopay – first professional athlete (American football) to be openly gay
- Joe Kuharich – former football player
- Larry Kuharich – former football coach
- Toni Kukoč – former NBA player
- Jim Laslavic - former NFL player
- Curtis Leskanic – baseball player
- Mickey Lolich – baseball player
- Tony Mandarich – NFL offensive player
- Marv Marinovich – retired American football offensive guard and sports trainer
- Todd Marinovich – former American and Canadian football quarterback
- Roger Maris – baseball player
- Dino Mattessich – former Maryland lacrosse coach, current University of Connecticut Sr. Assoc. Athletic Director
- John Mayasich — former hockey player
- Kevin McHale – former NBA player
- Catfish Metkovich – MLB player
- Joe Mihaljevic – former soccer player
- Ed Mikan – former NBA player
- George Mikan – former NBA player
- Pat Miletich – UFC champion, martial artist
- Stipe Miocic – UFC heavyweight champion, only man to ever defend the title three consecutive times
- Rob Ninkovich – NFL player
- Jim Obradovich – former NFL player
- Erv Palica – former MLB pitcher
- Mark Pavelich – retired professional ice hockey player; member of the 1980 gold medal-winning USA "Miracle on Ice" team at the Winter Olympics
- George Perpich – former football player
- Johnny Pesky – former baseball player and announcer
- Dan Plesac – baseball player
- Gregg Popovich – NBA coach and five-time NBA champion
- Christian Pulisic – winger/attacking midfielder for the United States men's national soccer team and English Premier League club Chelsea
- Ed Puskarich – former soccer player
- Nico Radicic - college Place Kicker at Indiana
- Ante Razov – US National Soccer Team player
- John Robic – Kentucky Basketball assistant coach
- Lou Saban – football coach
- Nick Saban – seven-time National Champion NCAA football coach
- Vladimir "Spider" Sabich – skier
- Buzz Schneider – member of the 1980 "USA Miracle on Ice" Olympic Ice Hockey Team
- Frank Sinkwich – Heisman trophy winner
- Max Starcevich - College football
- Joe Stydahar – former NFL player
- Andrew Susac – MLB player
- Joey Terdoslavich – MLB player
- John Tomac – cyclist
- Rudy Tomjanovich – NBA basketball player and Hall of Fame coach
- Auggie Vidovich II – driver in the NASCAR Busch Series
- Bill Vinovich – NFL official
- Danny Vranes (Vranješ) – professional basketball player (NBA); NBA All-Defensive Second Team 1985
- Fritzie Zivic – "Croat Comet", world boxing champion (welterweight)
- Mike Zordich – former NFL player
- Chris Zorich – former NFL player

== Writers ==
- Courtney Angela Brkic – anthropologist, writer
- Michael Cunningham – author
- Richard Kauzlarich – diplomat, writer, and intelligence analyst
- Nicholas Kulish – author and journalist
- Josip Marohnić – published the first book of Croatian poetry in America, Amerikanke
- Ottessa Moshfegh – writer
- Josip Novakovich – writer
- Jason Smilovic – writer, executive producer
- Tom Sunic – writer, former professor
- Amanda Petrusich – music journalist
- Natasha Sajé - poet

== Others ==
- Joan Biskupic – journalist
- Steven Biskupic – former US Attorney
- Mike Cernovich - Media personality. Mike’s paternal grandfather was Mike Cernovich (the son of John Cernovich and Anna/Anne Matušić who were Croatian immigrants.
- Blase Cardinal Cupich – Roman Catholic Archbishop of Chicago
- Edward J. Damich – former judge and professor
- John Owen Dominis – last Hawaiian royalty, by marriage to Hawaiian Queen Lydia Kamekaha Kapaaka in 1862
- Mike Grgich – winemaker; 1976 winner at the Judgement of Paris for the Best White Wine in the world; inducted into the Vintner's Hall of Fame in 2008
- Noma Gurich – judge serving as a justice of the Oklahoma Supreme Court
- Jay Kordich (1923–2017) – "father of juicing" and the inventor of the Juiceman Juicer. Both his parents were Croatian immigrants from the island of Vis.
- Bill Kurtis – television journalist and producer
- Frank Kurtis - race car builder
- Michael Lah – cartoonist
- Louis Lucas – winemaker
- Dwight N. Manley - businessman, numismatist, professional sports agent, real estate developer
- Capricia Penavic Marshall – Chief of Protocol of the United States (2009 to August 2013; father of Croatian descent)
- Anthony Maglica – inventor, owner and founder of Mag Instrument Inc.
- Boris Mikšić – Cortec Corporation owner and founder
- Zinka Milanov – operatic soprano
- Joe "Pegleg" Morgan - organised crime gangster
- Steve Nelson (born Stjepan Mesaros) – Spanish Civil War veteran and Communist Party leader
- Katie Pavlich – journalist, blogger, political commentator, author, podcaster.
- Kevin Radich – sports reporter
- Bill Rancic – entrepreneur; husband of E! News' Giuliana DePandi
- Gene Rayburn – radio and television personality
- Tony Robbins – motivational speaker and author
- Teresa Scanlan – Miss America 2011
- Miroslav Volf – Protestant theologian
- Paul Washer - Protestant Christian evangelist - Croatian mother and grandmother
- Vanna White – television personality (biological father of Puerto Rican and Croatian descent; she was adopted and reared by her stepfather, whose name she took)

== See also ==
- List of people from Croatia
- Croatian Americans
