= Croatian Americans =

Americans of Croatian birth or descent

Croatian Americans Američki Hrvati
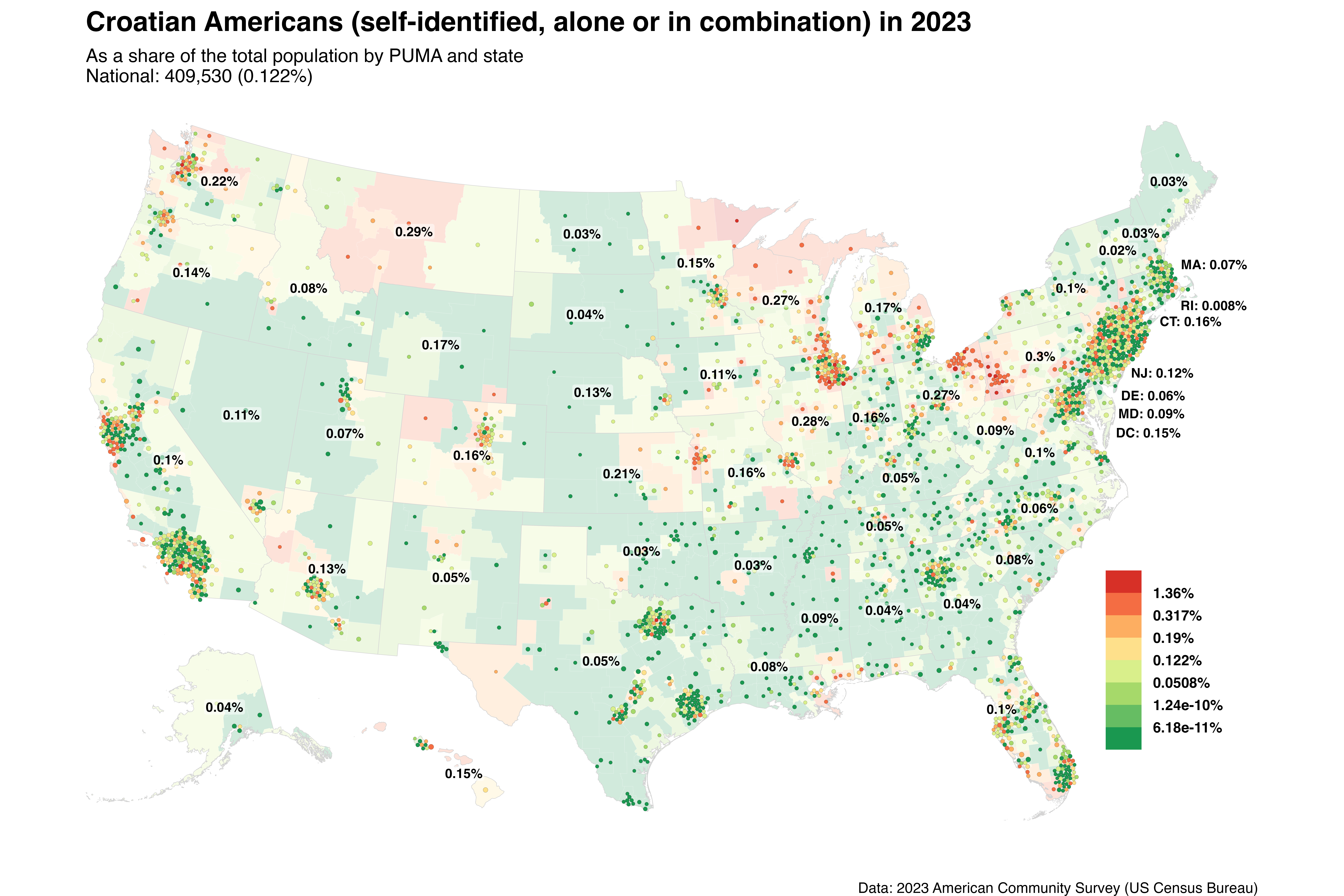

Total population
- 374,562–1.2 million+ (est.)

Regions with significant populations
- Pennsylvania, Illinois, Ohio, California, North Carolina, Pacific Northwest, New York, Wisconsin, Indiana, Michigan, Florida, Georgia, Kansas, Louisiana, Missouri, Nevada, Colorado and Minnesota.

Languages
- American English and Croatian

Religion
- Predominantly Roman Catholicism

Related ethnic groups
- Other Croats, Croatian Canadians, Croatian Australians, Croatian New Zealanders, Catholic Americans, Czech Americans, Polish Americans, Serbian Americans, Italian Americans, Irish Americans, Slovak Americans, Lithuanian Americans, Slovene Americans, Hungarian Americans, Rusyn Americans, Ukrainian Americans

Croatian Americans or Croat Americans (Croatian: Američki Hrvati) are Americans who have full or partial Croatian or Croat ancestry. It is the largest Croatian diaspora in the world, with up to 1.2 million Croatians and their descendants living in the United States as of 2016. The figure includes all people affiliated with U.S. who claim Croatian ancestry, both those born in the country and naturalized citizens, as well as those with dual citizenship who affiliate themselves with both countries or cultures. Croatian Americans significantly influence Croatia–United States relations.

Croatian Americans identify with other European American ethnic groups, especially Slavic Americans and are predominantly of Roman Catholic faith. Regions with large Croatian American population include metropolitan areas of Chicago, Cleveland, Detroit, New York City, Los Angeles, and Pittsburgh, the seat of Croatian Fraternal Union, fraternal benefit society of the Croatian diaspora. In 2025, there were 374,562 American citizens of Croat or Croatian descent living in the United States according to the United States Census Bureau's American Community Survey.

== Demographics ==
=== Numbers ===
According to the 2007 U.S. Community Survey, there were 420,763 Americans of full or partial Croatian descent. According to the 1990 United States census, there were over 544,270 Croatian Americans who identified themselves as being of Croatian descent or being born in Croatia. As of 2025, there were 374,562 American citizens. It is estimated by the Croatia's State Office for the Croats Abroad that there are around 1,200,000 Croats and their descendants living in the United States today.

In the 2006–2010 American Community Survey, the states with the largest Croatian American populations are:

- Pennsylvania (50,995)
- California (45,537)
- Illinois (44,065)
- Ohio (41,430)
- New York (26,607)
- Michigan (20,547)
- Florida (16,360)
- Wisconsin (15,775)
- Indiana (13,306)
- Washington (13,268)
- New Jersey (13,154)

=== History ===
- 1880 estimate: 20,000
- 1980 census: 252,970
- 1990 census: 544,270
- 2000 census: 374,241
- 2005 community survey: 401,208

=== Croatian-born population ===
Croatian-born population in the U.S. from 2010 to 2017 according to the American FactFinder numbered:

Year	Number
2010	47,740
2011	▼41,484
2012	▲45,295
2013	▼39,026
2014	▲43,067
2015	▼36,978
2016	▲39,747
2017	▼35,962

== History ==
The first major immigration of Croats was recorded in 1715. At the time, approximately twelve hundred Croatian Protestants, whose ancestors had left the Archduchy of Austria after unsuccessful peasant revolts in 1573 and anti-Reformation edict of 1598, arrived in the American colony of Georgia. They settled in the valley of Savannah River. Those settlers introduced silk-worm cultivation in Georgia. The community prospered for 150 years, until it was demolished during the Civil War.

In 1683, a Croat Jesuit, named Ivan Ratkaj (Juan Ratkay) established a mission in northwest New Spain. In 1746, another Jesuit, Ferdinand Konšak (Consago Gonzales), drew the first dependable map of Baja California. Beginning in 1783, Joseph Kundek, a Croat missionary, helped to develop several midwestern towns, including Ferdinand and Jasper, both in Dubois County, Indiana. In the 1830s, various groups in the Austrian Empire sent financial aid to America to support missionary activities.

Many early Croat immigrants settled in New Orleans, and were employed as traders, artisans and fishermen. By the 1860s, there were around six hundred Croat families in New Orleans. Several families settled permanently in Alabama. During the Civil War, some three thousand Croats resided in the South, mostly in Louisiana, Alabama and Mississippi. Hundreds of them volunteered for the Confederate Army and Navy. After the defeat of the Confederacy in 1865, many Croats who had served in the Confederate military moved to the West.

Significant emigration from what is now Croatia dates from the mid-late 1880s and early 1890s, peaking around 1905-1910, when many Croatians, the majority of them Roman Catholics, began emigrating to the United States. Many were economic immigrants, while others considered themselves political refugees.

Like other immigrants of that period, they migrated to find employment. Many of them, mostly single young men but, often, married women with or without their families, settled in small towns in Pennsylvania and New York as coal miners or steelworkers. Many also settled in factory towns and farming areas in Midwestern states such as Wisconsin, Minnesota, Indiana, Illinois, and Iowa. For most of the single men, the stay was only temporary. Once they had saved enough money, many Croatian men returned to Croatia. However, those who did choose to stay found permanent residence.

Within a comparatively short period of time, Croatians could be found all over the United States from New York to California, from New Orleans to Minneapolis-St. Paul. As it went through its most rapid expansion during the time of the 1890-1914 Great Migration and shortly thereafter from the onset of the First World War to the general clampdown on immigration in 1924, Croats and other South and West Slavs and members of other groups peaking in influx at the time were prominent in the history of the mining industry in the Iron Range of Minnesota; much the same is the case with the forestry-related industries there, elsewhere in Minnesota and in much of Wisconsin. A notable Croatian-American from the Iron Range was Rudy Perpich, the 34th and 36th Governor of the state representing the Democrat/Farmer-Labor Party; he served terms in office from December 29, 1976, to January 4, 1979, and from January 3, 1983, to January 7, 1991, spans of time which add up to make him the longest-serving governor in the state's history. In private life, Perpich was a dentist and after leaving office in 1991 assisted the post-communist government of Croatia. He was born in Carson Lake, Minnesota (now part of Hibbing) on June 27, 1928, and died of cancer in Minnetonka, Minnesota on 21 September 1995.

A new wave of Croatian immigrants began to arrive after World War II. These were mostly political refugees, including orphans whose parents had been killed during the war, individuals and families fleeing Yugoslavia's communist authorities. Most of these Croatians settled in established Croatian colonies, often among relatives and friends. Beginning in 1965, America saw a new influx of Croatians. Gradually, this new wave of immigrants joined Croatian Catholic parishes and organizations, and soon became the contemporary bearers of Croatian culture and tradition in the United States. Currently, only a small number of Croatians continue to emigrate, mostly those who have relatives already well established in America.

Croatian immigrants also settled in Texas, Oklahoma and Missouri (esp. Kansas City and St. Louis). A Croatian community developed in Mobile, Alabama and another similar community in Pueblo, Colorado.

Mississippi and Biloxi declared 22 September Croatian Heritage Day on 22 September 2023.

== Settlements ==
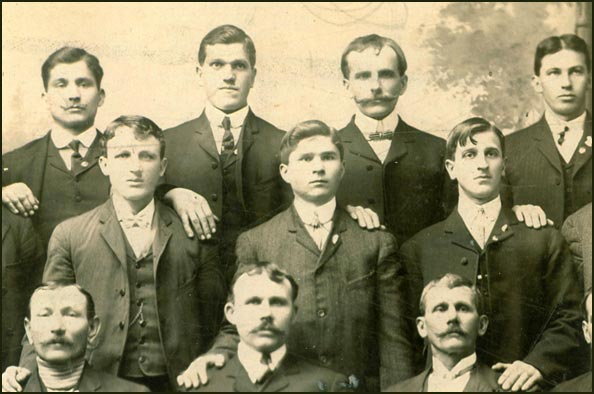
Group of Croatian men in the club of town Joliet, Illinois around 1900

The first recorded Croatian immigrants to the United States arrived in 1850, often via the resettlement from nations that are presently known as Austria, Italy, Greece, Spain, and Portugal, and southern France. During this period many Croats, who were employed in manufacturing the maritime sector of the Mediterranean states, began emigrating to the Americas. This first wave arrived in regions of the United States where employment opportunities were similar to where they had arrived from. By the middle of the 20th Century, the metropolitan areas of Chicago, Cleveland, Pittsburgh, New York City, San Francisco Bay Area and the region of Southern California had the largest populations of people with Croatian ancestry.

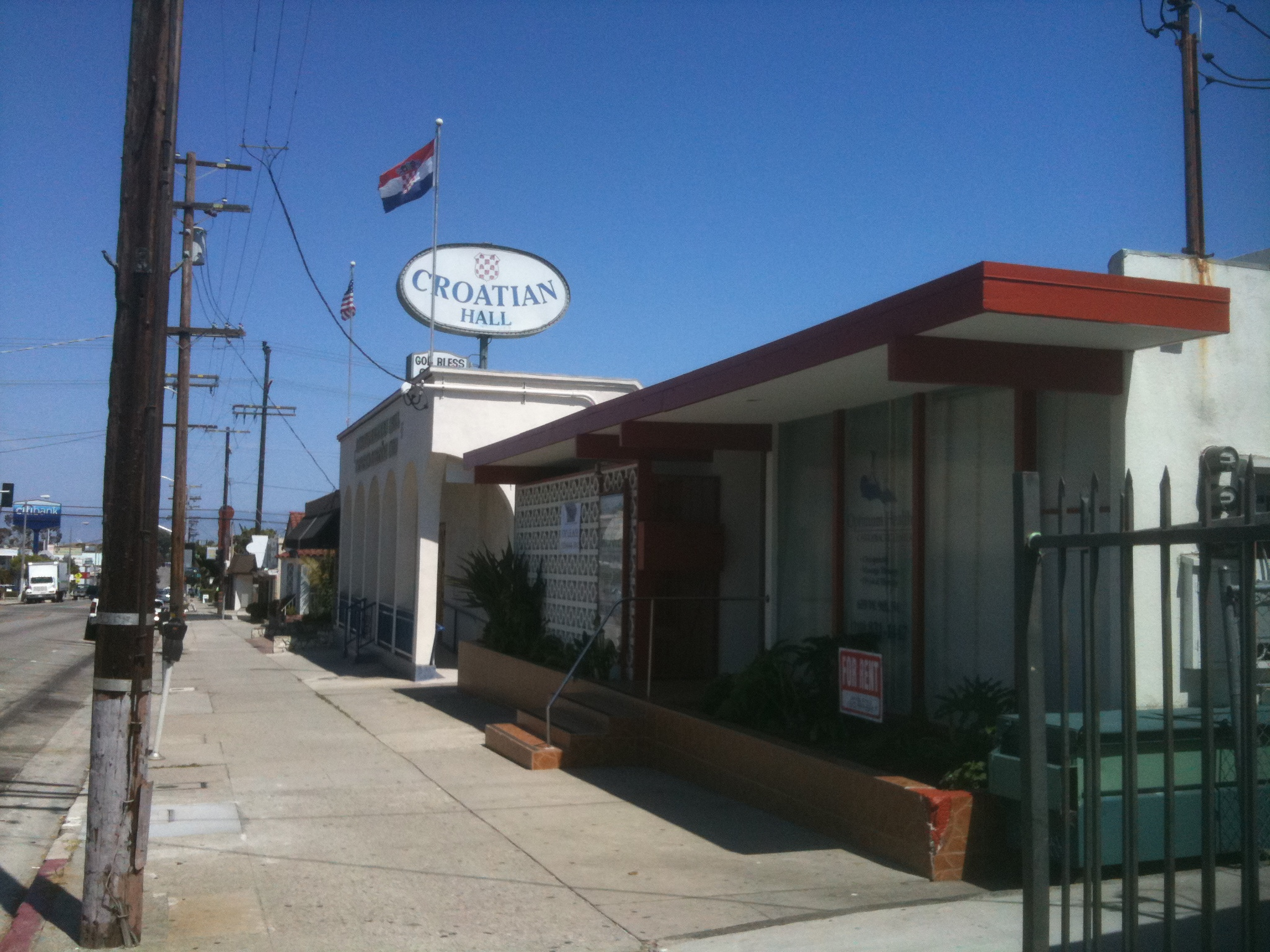
Croatian Place district in San Pedro, Los Angeles, California.

Croatian immigrants first settled in the Western United States in the second half of the 19th century, mainly in what were then growing urban centers of Los Angeles, San Pedro, San Francisco, Phoenix and Santa Ana. It is estimated that more than 35,000 Croats live in Los Angeles metropolitan area today, making it the biggest Croatian community on the Pacific coast. San Francisco became the center of Croatian social life in California, where they established the first Croatian emigration society, Croatian American Cultural Center of San Francisco, in 1857. Tadich Grill in San Francisco is an example from the era, the oldest continuously running restaurant in the city. The Los Angeles metropolitan area was a major destination for the post-1980s Yugoslavian immigration, including Croats and Bosnian Croats from Bosnia and Herzegovina who escaped the Bosnian civil war in the 1990s. They formed several communities in Orange County, San Diego and San Fernando Valley.

An unspecified number of Croats also settled in Washington state and Oregon, particularly metropolitan areas of Seattle and Portland respectively.

Some of the first groups of immigrants settled in Pennsylvania as well. As a major industrial center of the state, Pittsburgh employed a lot of immigrants from Croatia, many of them were working in the heavy industry. At the beginning of the century there were an estimated 38,000 Croats in Pittsburgh. It was estimated that there were more than 200,000 Croatians and their descendants living in Pennsylvania in the early 1990s.

Similar to Pittsburgh, Cleveland's industrial economy drew a similarly sized Croat population, which to this day remains the second largest in the US. Case Western Reserve University estimates over 150,000 ethnic Croats live in Northeast Ohio, which is also the largest US diaspora of Slovenes and Hungarians, Croatia's neighbors.

The first Croatian settlers in Michigan appeared in the late 19th century. In Illinois, the Croatians started concentrating mostly around Chicago. Although it was created a bit later, the Croatian settlement in Chicago became one of the most important ones in the United States. The settlement especially started developing after World War I and Chicago became the center of all Croatian cultural and political activities. It is calculated that there were roughly 50,000 Croats in Chicago in the 1990s, while there were altogether 100,000 Croats living in 54 additional Croatian settlements in Illinois. Croats form a large community in Indianapolis in Indiana since the 1910s, as well in Gary, Fort Wayne and South Bend.

While at first New York City served merely as a station on arriving settlers' way elsewhere into the United States, mainly the Midwest, East Coast saw an influx of Croatian and other European settlers in early 19th, before and following First World War; mainly the cities of Hoboken and New York, the latter of which is the site of SS. Cyril, Methodius, and Raphael's Church, a Roman Catholic parish, part of Roman Catholic Archdiocese of New York.

During the Klondike Gold Rush, a group of 3,000 Croatian immigrants settled in Alaska and Canada.

There is a Croatian community in Las Vegas.

== Culture ==
=== Social association ===
Croatian Americans maintain a close relationship with the region they come from. The diaspora is considered to have played a pivotal role in securing Croatia's victory in Croatian War of Independence by providing substantial financial aid and advocating for American involvement in the conflict. Chain migration contributed to the creation of settlements of Croats coming from the same regions of Croatia. They were connected because of their similar occupations that they had, equal social status and Roman Catholic religion. The most popular informal meeting points of Croatians were the saloons. They were usually engaged in various charity organizations, and were among the first Croatian immigrants who learned to speak English. Beside these informal gatherings, Croatian Americans established several thousand organizations of different importance. In his work, "Early Croatian Immigration to America After 1945", Prpic states that there were around 3,000 organizations founded between 1880 and 1940 in the United States. Croatians first started founding charitable, cultural, educational, religious, business, political, sporting or athletic organizations. All these organizations were firmly rooted in the settlement where they were initiated. Croatians were a minority group both in relation to Americans and other nationalities. Furthermore, the Croats came with the latest groups of immigrants, which led to a further feeling of insecurity. Most of early settlers did not speak English and held low-paid jobs, which created an inferiority complex. They found security within an organization of their own ethnic group.

=== Religion ===
The Croatian diaspora is predominantly Roman Catholic. Croatian missionaries founded parishes, churches and benevolent societies throughout the country wherever Croatian Americans settled. Often, the priests were the only educated members of the Croatian colonies, and thus they had to assume leadership roles; moreover, they were among the first to learn English well and often served as translators and interpreters. Their primary responsibility, however, was the organization of Croatian Catholic parishes in the urban centers with substantial Croatian populations. Thus, at the beginning of this century there were Croatian churches in Pittsburgh and Steelton, Pennsylvania, New York, Chicago, Cleveland, Saint Louis and other cities. The oldest parish is St. Nicholas Church in Pittsburgh, founded in 1894; several others were erected in the early 1900s, such as the Church of the Nativity in San Francisco. Even before being officially established in 1926, the Croatian Franciscan friars traveled throughout the United States, establishing and assisting in Croatian parishes and keeping alive the religious and national sentiments of their people. Today, there are over 30 Croatian parishes in North America. For example, in New Jersey there are St. Cyril and Methodius and St. Raphael Catholic parishes that also serve as Croatian Catholic missions.

=== Organizations ===
- The Croatian American organization Croatian Fraternal Union is a society with long roots in the country. It was founded in 1897. During World War II, the organization provided financial aid for Croatia. The CFU contributes to Croatian Americans by scholarships and cultural learning.
- The National Federation of Croatian Americans Cultural Foundation was founded in 1993 in Chicago as a non-profit organization dedicated to promoting the interest of the Croatian people - embodying heritage of culture and language, integrity in human rights and equality in self-determination, advancing economic development, and freedom from persecution.
- The Croatian American Association is a group which lobbies the United States Congress on issues related to Croatia.
- In 2007, the annual Croatian Film Festival in New York was founded by The Doors Art Foundation.
- In October 2022, National Federation of Croatian Americans Cultural Foundation held inaugural induction of laureates in the Croatian-American Sports Hall of Fame in Cleveland: Helen Crlenkovich, Fred Couples, John Havlicek, Mickey Lolich, Roger Maris, Kevin McHale, George Mikan, Mark Pavelich, Joe Sakic and Joe Stydahar. 2024 inductees were: Ralph Cindrich, Bill Fralic, Kara Grgas-Wheeler Goucher, Tim Grgurich, Jim Laslavic, John Mayasich, Frank Sinkwich, Frank Solich, Rudy Tomjanovich, Paul Tomasovich and Ferdinand “Fritzie” Zivic.

=== Clubs ===
In 1973, Croatian Cultural Club Cardinal Stepinac was established in Montville, New Jersey at the land acquired by the Croatian community, parishioners of St. Cyril and Methodius and St. Raphael parishes, on the initiative of the Father Mladen Čuvalo. Club gathers Croats of New York and New Jersey.

=== Events ===
City of Los Angeles Croatian Culture Week was held in LA from 19 to 28 May 2023., with Croatian Heritage Night hosted by Los Angeles Football Club and Southern California Croatian Bocce Ball Tournament. Croatian Festival and Picnic of the Croatian Catholic Parish of St. Anthony in Los Angeles is traditionally organized on the feast day of Nativity of Mary. Traditional picnic for the same occasion is also organized in New York by Cultural Club Cardinal Stepinac.

San Pedro, California is a host of the Croatian Tennis Tournament. The annual Croatian Street Party is held at Croatian Hall in San Pedro.

Radio Days of Vinko Kužina (Croatian: Radijski dani Vinka Kužine) premiered at the Croatian parish of ‘St. Cyril and Methodius’ in Manhattan, at the end of October 2023.

=== Cuisine ===
Salads, sarma, börek and polenta are popular among Croatian Americans.

== Celebrations ==
- Los Angeles declared the month of May as Croatian Cultural Heritage Month in 2024.

== Media ==
Croatian Radio New York was established in Manhattan, in 1969. Radio founders purchased the building in 1977, thus housing the radio station. As of February 2024, 20 volunteers run the programm. Croatian president Kolinda Grabar-Kitarović awarded Croatian Radio Club New York with the Charter of the Republic of Croatia.

Croatian American Media Association Corp runs "Croatians Online" digital media platform in four languages (Croatian, English, German and Spanish) with radio, streaming, social media content and podcasts with aim to "connect Croats around the world through their life experiences, customs, culture, history, music, art and gastronomy".

== Notable people ==
Notable Croatian Americans, past and present, include:

=== Art ===
- Mirko Ilić, graphic designer and comics artist
- Ivan Meštrović, sculptor and Professor at Syracuse and Notre Dame
- Vinko Nikolić, writer, poet and journalist
- Maksimilijan Vanka, painter
- Matthew Yuricich, Academy Award nominated special effects artist

=== Film ===
- Anna Chlumsky, actress
- Christina Cindrich, television producer, host, and actress
- Jenna Elfman, actress
- Josip Elic, actor
- Judah Friedlander, actor and comedian
- Mira Furlan, actress
- Gloria Grey, actress
- Bobby Grubic, film and commercial director / producer
- Anne Jackson, actress
- Lou Lumenick, film critic
- Branko Lustig, film producer, Academy Award winner
- John Malkovich, actor
- Joe Manganiello, actor
- Ivana Miličević, actress
- John Miljan, actor
- Sergio Mimica-Gezzan, television director
- Daniella Monet, actress
- Patrick Muldoon, actor
- Frank Pavich, director
- George Payne (actor), pornographic film actor
- Rick Rossovich, actor
- Izabela Vidovic, actress
- Goran Višnjić, actor
- Dianne Wiest, actress
- Louis Zorich, actor
- Jim Zulevic, actor and comedian

=== Music ===
- "Weird Al" Yankovic - singer, musician, songwriter, record producer, actor, and author.
- Thana Alexa - jazz vocalist, composer, arranger, and producer.
- Zlatko Baloković, violinist
- Tony Butala, lead singer of vocal group, The Lettermen
- Alex Katunich, bassist of Incubus
- Clair Marlo (born Clara Veseliza), singer, songwriter, composer, and record producer
- Sanya Mateyas Croatian born (as Sanja Matejaš) singer, lead singer for Los Angeles-based hard-rock band Duda Did It
- Tatjana Matejaš Cameron, singer
- Miljenko Matijević, singer and songwriter; the lead vocalist of rock band Steelheart
- Johnny Mercer, four-time Academy Award winner
- Helen Merrill (born Jelena Milcetic), jazz singer
- Zinka Milanov, operatic spinto soprano
- Tomo Miličević, musician and lead guitarist of the alternative rock band Thirty Seconds to Mars
- Guy Mitchell, pop singer
- Krist Novoselić, bassist of Nirvana
- Marty Paich, pianist, composer, arranger, record producer, music director, and conductor.
- David Paich, keyboardist for the rock band Toto, composer, arranger, producer
- Mia Slavenska, prima ballerina
- Louis Svećenski, violinist and rector of the Boston Academy of Music
- Paul Salamunovich, renowned choral conductor of the Los Angeles Master Chorale
- Frank Secich, rock musician, songwriter, author, record producer (Blue Ash, Stiv Bators, Club Wow)
- Johnny Vidacovich, jazz drummer. Father's side Croatian, mother's side Sicilian.

=== Science ===
- Milislav Demerec, geneticist
- Terry Jonathan Hart, former astronaut
- Jacob Matijevic, NASA engineer
- Paul L. Modrich, biochemist, Nobel Prize in Chemistry (2015)
- Mario Puratić, inventor of Puretic power block
- Bogdan Raditsa, historian
- Pasko Rakic, neuroscientist
- George M. Skurla, aeronautical engineer for the Apollo Program
- Henry Suzzallo, president of the University of Washington
- Dinko Tomašić, sociologist

=== Politics ===
- Michael D. Antonovich, Republican politician in California
- Mark Begich, Democratic senator from Alaska
- Nick Begich, Democratic representative from Alaska
- Michael Anthony Bilandic, Democratic mayor of Chicago
- Frank Ivancie, Democratic mayor of Portland, Oregon
- Dennis Kucinich, Democratic representative from Ohio
- John Kasich, Republican governor of Ohio
- Rose Mofford, Democratic governor of Arizona
- Rudy Perpich, Democratic governor of Minnesota
- George Radanovich, Republican representative from California
- Michael Stepovich, Republican governor of Alaska Territory
- Pete Visclosky, Democratic representative from Indiana

=== Entrepreneurs ===
- Tony Robbins, coach
- Mike Grgich, winemaker
- Anthony Francis Lucas, oil industry pioneer
- Anthony Maglica, entrepreneur and inventor of Maglite flashlights
- Mario Puratic, entrepreneur and inventor of Puretic power block

=== Sports ===
- Bill Belichick, professional football coach
- Kris Bubic, professional baseball player
- Pete Carroll, professional football coach
- Jason Chorak, college football player
- Krešimir Ćosić, professional basketball player
- Duje Dukan, professional basketball player, born in Croatia
- David Diehl, professional football player, Croatian on mother's side
- Greg Dulcich, professional football player, full Croatian on father and mother's sides
- Lucas Erceg, professional baseball player
- Elvis Grbac, professional football player
- Cameron Johnson, professional NBA basketball player
- John Jurkovic, professional football player
- Jason Kelce, professional football player
- Travis Kelce, professional football player
- Toni Kukoč, professional basketball player
- Mickey Lolich, professional baseball player
- Roger Maris, professional baseball player
- John Mayasich, hockey player
- Kevin McHale and John Havlicek, NBA hall of fame members, both share Croatian ancestry on their mothers' sides (Starcevic and Turkalj being their mothers' respective maiden names)
- Pat Miletich, UFC Hall of Famer
- Stipe Miocic, UFC World Heavyweight Champion
- George Mikan, professional NBA basketball player
- Mark Pavelich, professional hockey player
- Mike Pecarovich - American college football coach, lawyer, and actor.
- Johnny Pesky, professional baseball player and announcer
- Iva Jovic, professional tennis player
- Christian Pulisic, professional soccer player
- Gene Rayburn, game show host
- Lou Saban, football coach
- Nick Saban, professional football coach
- Jaleen Smith, basketball guard in the Israeli Basketball Premier League; naturalized Croatian
- Rudy Tomjanovich, professional basketball player and coach
- Danny Vranes (Vranješ), professional NBA basketball player
- Fritzie Zivic, boxer, held the world welterweight championship

=== Religion ===
- Blase Joseph Cupich, American catholic cardinal
- Ivan Dragićević, Catholic visionary
- Ferdinand Konščak, Croatian missionary to North America
- John E. Kozar, Roman Catholic priest and president of the Catholic Near East Welfare Association

=== Other ===
- Mike Cernovich, social media personality and political commentator.
- Norman Cota, United States Army general
- Louis Cukela, United States Marine, two-time Medal of Honor recipient
- Jakša Cvitanić, mathematician
- William Feller, mathematician
- Gary Gabelich, race car driver.
- Anthony Jeselnik, comedian.
- Kathy Keller, Christian writer
- Ron Kovic, anti-war activist
- Brian Krzanich, ex-CEO of Intel
- John Miscovich inventor
- Peter Miscovich (born Pero Mišković, 1885–1950), founder of the world's longest-operating family-owned gold mine still in operation.
- Steve Nelson (activist), labor activist and organizer, political Commissar in the Abraham Lincoln Brigade, and National Commander of the Veterans of the Abraham Lincoln Brigade (VALB)
- Nick Piantanida, an amateur parachute jumper
- Bill Rancic, entrepreneur, reality TV star, winner of the first season of The Apprentice
- John J. Tominac, Medal of Honor recipient
- Peter Tomich, Medal of Honor recipient, United States Navy sailor

== In Literature ==
John Grisham's novel "The Boys from Biloxi" is focused on the Croatian American community of Biloxi. Grisham describes in considerable detail the family history of his protagonists, third-generation Croatian Americans, and the general development of the Croatian community in Biloxi.

== See also ==
- Croats
- List of Croats
- Croatia–United States relations
- Yugoslav Americans

== Notes and references ==
1. "Croat Americans" is seldom used in the United States, with "Croatian Americans" being far more common. In Croatian itself, "American Croats" (Američki Hrvati) is most commonly used, with "Croats in America" (Hrvati u Americi) being a close alternative.

Citations

Bibliography

- Barkan, Elliott Robert (2013). Immigrants in American History: Arrival, Adaptation, and Integration. Santa Barbara, California: ABC-CLIO. ISBN 978-1-59884-219-7.
- Dele Olasiji, Thompson (1995). Migrants, Immigrants, and Slaves: Racial and Ethnic Groups in America. University Press of America. ISBN 978-0-81919-738-2.
- Eterovich, Francis H.; Spalatin, Christopher, eds. (1964). Croatia: Land, People, and Culture. Toronto: University of Toronto Press.
- Gorvorchin, Gerald G. (1961). A History of the Croatian People. Gainesville: University of Florida.
- Preveden, Francis (1962). A History of the Croatian People. New York: Philosophic.
- Prpic, George (1971). The Croatian Immigrants in America. New York: Philosophic. ISBN 9780802220356.
- Shapiro, Ellen (1989). The Croatian Americans. New York: Chelsea House.
