= Skurla =

Skurla is a surname. Notable people with the surname include:

- George M. Skurla (1921–2001), American aerospace engineer
- William C. Skurla (born 1956), American Ruthenian Eastern Catholic bishop, current leader of Ruthenian Church
- Laurus Škurla (1928–2008), American Russian Orthodox bishop, leader of Russian Foreign Church
