= Royce R. Lewellen =

American judge and vineyard owner (1930–2020)

Royce Rutledge Lewellen (September 25, 1930 – September 2, 2020) was a California Superior Court Judge in Santa Barbara County and namesake of the Royce R. Lewellen Justice Center in Santa Maria, CA. He was also co-owner of Lucas & Lewellen Vineyards in Santa Barbara County.

== Early years ==
Judge Lewellen was born in St. Louis, MO in 1930 and spent most of his youth in Jefferson City, MO. He received his Bachelor of Arts degree from the University of Missouri in Columbia and after two years service in the U.S. Air Force attended the UC Berkeley School of Law, graduating in 1957.

== Legal career ==
Judge Lewellen practiced civil law in Solvang, CA and served as the Solvang Justice Court Judge from 1969 to 1975. He was then appointed to the Superior Court in Santa Maria where he served until 1990. The courthouse complex in Santa Maria was named in his honor in 1992.

== Lucas & Lewellen Vineyards ==
In 1996 Judge Lewellen partnered with Louis Lucas, a local pioneer grape grower to form Lucas & Lewellen Vineyards. The company owns three vineyards in Santa Barbara County producing 24 grape varietals and operates a winery in Buellton, CA and two tasting rooms in Solvang, CA.

== Community and personal life ==
Judge Lewellen was involved in many community organizations, most notably as Founding Director of both the PCPA Foundation and Solvang Festival Theatre. He also was a Founding Director of The Community Bank of Santa Maria and was a long-time Director of Contract Freighters, Inc. He had three sons, Mark, Michael and David with his former wife Judy Guder. He was married to Ann Foxworthy Lewellen from 2004 until his death.
