= Steven Z. Pavletic =

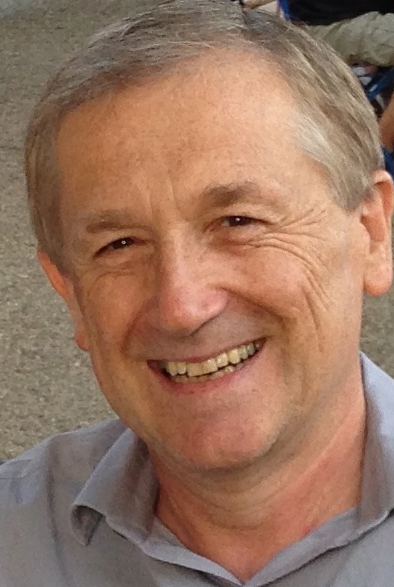
- Born: January 25, 1956; Zagreb, Croatia
- Education: University of Zagreb School of Medicine
- Occupations: Hematologist, Oncologist
- Awards: NCI Director's Award (2006)

Steven Z. Pavletic (born 25 January 1956) is a Croatian-American physician and researcher in hematology and oncology known for his role in developing consensus guidelines for clinical trials in chronic Graft-versus-host disease (GVHD).

== Academic and medical career ==
Pavletic (born Živko Pavletić) was born in Zagreb, Croatia, where he earned his M.D. from the University of Zagreb School of Medicine in 1979. He then completed a clinical fellowship in bone marrow transplantation in 1992 at the Fred Hutchinson Cancer Research Center and the University of Washington School of Medicine in Seattle, Washington. In 1995 he completed an internal medicine residency at the University of Nebraska Medical Center, where he also had hematology and oncology fellowships in 1997. From 1999 until 2002 he was the Director of the Allogeneic Stem Cell Transplantation program at the University of Nebraska.

Currently, he is the Head of the Graft-versus-host disease (GVHD) and Autoimmunity Unit and Senior Clinician at the Experimental Transplantation and Immunology Branch of the National Cancer Institute's (NCI) Center for Cancer Research at the U.S. National Institutes of Health (NIH). He is presently also an Adjunct Professor of Medicine and Oncology at Lombardi Cancer Center, Georgetown University, Washington, D.C.

== Research and publications ==
Pavletic's main area of research is in the field of hematopoietic stem cell transplantation for hematologic malignancies, chronic Graft-versus-host disease (GVHD) and transplantation for autoimmune disease, with a particular interest in addressing late effects in cancer therapy survivors. He is best known for his research on chronic GVHD, the most common late effect in cancer survivors who underwent allogeneic stem cell transplantations as a form of treatment.

Pavletic's research also includes pioneering work on the use of peripheral blood cells in allogeneic stem cell transplantation as a form of cancer treatment, as opposed to the use of stem cells from the bone marrow.

Pavletic leads a number of clinical trials on chronic GVHD at the National Cancer Institute at NIH. He is the chief editor of the first textbook on GVHD entitled “Chronic Graft Versus Host Disease: Interdisciplinary Management”, published in 2009. According to Scopus, Pavletic has published more than 200 articles in peer-reviewed journals. Six articles on a 2005 international consensus project for clinical trials in chronic GVHD were referenced more than 1600 times in peer-reviewed literature.

== Awards ==
In October 2006 Pavletic received the National Cancer Institute (NCI) Director's Individual Merit Award for his achievements in developing national and international consensus guidelines for clinical trials in chronic GVHD, which enabled research to be conducted on one of the most serious late effect cancer treatment complications in already cured patients. Six Croatian print media sources and the Voice of America reported on the award.

== U.S.–Croatia cancer research cooperation ==
Pavletic was recognized in May 2007 by the Croatian Society of Oncology for his efforts at initiating an NIH-European-Croatian expert consortium with the goal of developing strategies for the national cancer control program in Croatia. This cooperation paved the way for the signing of an agreement in 2010 between the United States and Croatia to foster educational cooperation and training in clinical oncology.

The United States Embassy in Zagreb, Croatia, granted Pavletic a United States Government stipend to spend six weeks at the University Hospital Centre Zagreb, Croatia, in 2013, to assist in the establishment of a multidisciplinary center for the treatment of chronic GVHD resulting from allogeneic stem cell transplantations. In 2013 the Zagreb chronic GVHD team was awarded an international peer-reviewed grant through the Unity Through Knowledge Fund (UKF).

== Other activities ==
Pavletic is president of Hrvatska ura (HURA), a Washington, D.C.–based initiative established in 2010 with the goal of building cultural, economic and scientific ties between the United States and Croatia by working with the Croatian American community. He also serves as vice president of the Association of Croatian American Professionals and is president of its Medicine and Health Sciences Section.
