= Bobby Grubic =

American film director and producer

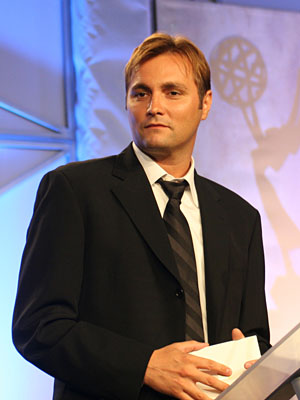
- Bobby Grubic at the Southeast Emmy Awards in 2007
- Born: Boško Grubić; January 8, 1972 (age 54); Sisak, SR Croatia, SFR Yugoslavia
- Other names: Bobby B. Grubic, Bobby G.
- Occupations: Director; producer; writer; record producer; Singer-songwriter; entrepreneur
- Years active: 1989–present
- Awards: 1999, 2006, 2007 NATAS Emmy Award
- Musical career
- Genres: Pop; rock; dance
- Instruments: Vocals, keyboards
- Labels: BGP, Cantus Records
- Website: www.artonixstudios.com www.bobbyg.com

Bobby Bosko Grubic (born Boško Grubić; on January 8, 1972) is a Croatian American producer, director, songwriter, composer, singer, entrepreneur, and environmental activist.

He is an NATAS Midsouth and two-time Southeast Emmy Award winner as director/producer for TV commercial spots and over the years has added numerous production and marketing awards to his collection. He was recognized for directing and producing two live-action short films by the Producers Guild of America Weekend Shorts Contest; which includes the action short The Parting Shot (2014) and the drama Change to Spare (2012). His creative development, directing and production experience includes: TV commercial productions, corporate videos, tourism promos, documentaries, biographies, film and video projects for domestic and international markets.

Grubic ventured into the music industry under the artist name Bobby G., his first single, which topped Croatian pop-dance radio charts, Ne Mogu Bez Tebe (Can't be Without You) was released in 2001, and his debut studio album Samo Ljubav (Simply Love) was released worldwide in 2002. His first USA National Television music airplay was in 2005 on NBC's The Today Show hosted by Matt Lauer live from Croatia, where Bobby's song "Ne Mogu Bez Tebe (I Can't Be Without You)" from his album "Samo Ljubav (Simply Love)" was used as the background music for "Today's" live clips in segments "Where in the World is Matt Lauer?" from Dubrovnik, Croatia.

From 2008 to 2010 he was the in-house Producer and Director of Broadcast Production for AIG Marketing and produced all of the TV, Radio and New media ads for 21st Century Insurance, prior to AIG selling the company to Farmers Insurance Group.

In 2010 he was considered for the Director of Croatian Radiotelevision (HRT).

He graduated from Nashville's nationally recognized Middle Tennessee State University Recording Industry, Production and Technology, and Entertainment technology programs and he holds a Master's Degree in Communication from Johns Hopkins University - Zanvyl Krieger School of Arts and Sciences.

== Discography ==
- Želim Te - single (1994.)
- Gibaj - single (1996.)
- Ne Mogu Bez Tebe - single for HRF festival (2001.)
- Samo Ljubav (Simply Love)(2002.)
- Ne Mogu Bez Tebe - Maxi (2003.)
- Sve Što Imam Ja - Maxi (2004.)
- Trebaš Mi Noćas - Maxi (2005.)

== Filmography ==
- Sore: Istri dari Masa Depan (2025)
- Lonely (Samoća) (2025)
- Experience Golden Slavonia (2021)
- Jewels (2018)
- Final Stop (2015)
- Fit to Be Tied (2014)
- The Parting Shot (2014)
- Counter Play (2012)
- Change to Spare (2012)

== Interviews ==
EPOHA: Bobby Boško Grubic Interview, August 31, 2020.
VEGAS MAGAZINE: Bobby B. Grubic Interview, February 8, 2017.
Elia Patricia Pekica: Na Diogenovu putu, 2010.
Đurđa Zorko, Jasminka Jagačić-Borić: Sisački biografski leksikon, 2006.
Matica hrvatska - Sisak: Riječ, 1999.
EPOHA, Novi uspjesi, br. 84, ožujak 2008.
EPOHA, Kreativnost ne poznaje granice, br. 76, srpanj 2007.
EPOHA, Treći Grubićev Emmy, god.VII. br. 75, lipanj 2007.
EPOHA, Od hipnotičkog brandiranja do nagrada najboljima, br. 66., rujan 2006.
