= Seine fishing =

Method of fishing with a net

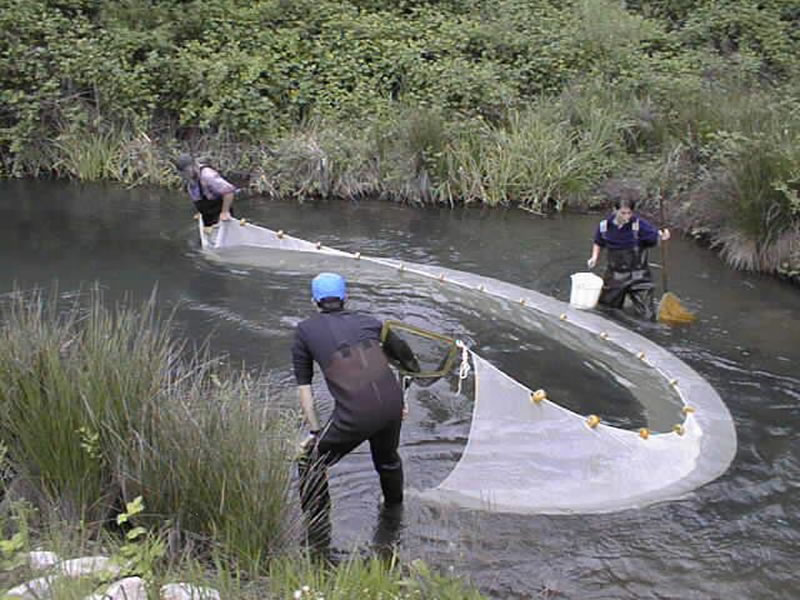
Seining for fish in a river.

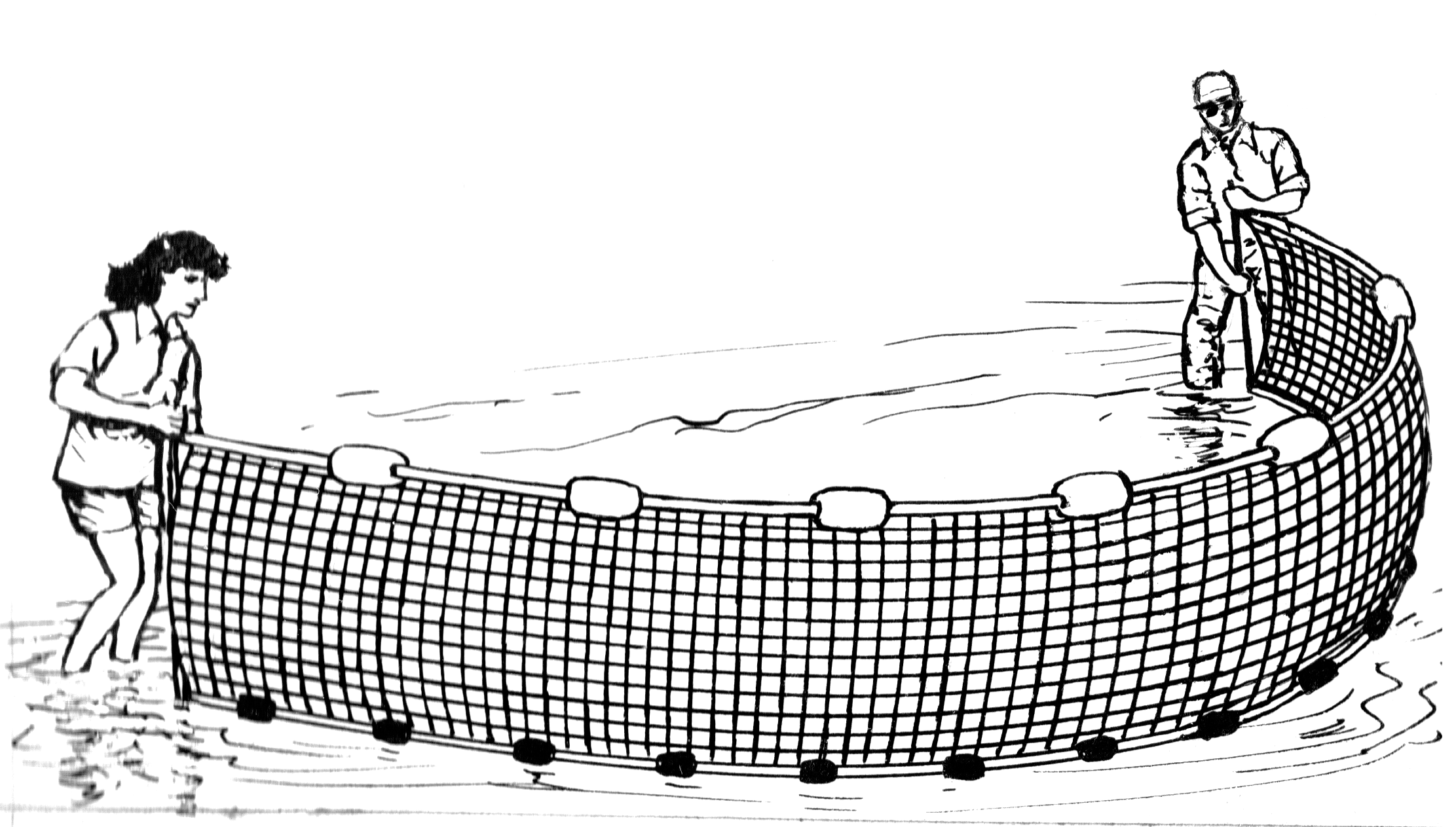
An illustration of a basic seine net.

Seine fishing (or seine-haul fishing; /seɪn/ SAYN) is a method of fishing that employs a surrounding net, called a seine, that hangs vertically in the water with its bottom edge held down by weights and its top edge buoyed by floats. Seine nets can be deployed from the shore as a beach seine, or from a boat.

Boats deploying seine nets are known as seiners. Two main types of seine net are deployed from seiners: purse seines and Danish seines. A seine differs from a gillnet, in that a seine encloses fish, where a gillnet directly snares fish.

== Etymology ==
The word seine has its origins in the Old English segne, which entered the language via Latin sagena, from the original Greek: σαγήνη sagēnē (a drag-net).

== History ==
Seines have been used widely in the past, including by Stone Age societies. For example, the Māori used large canoes to deploy seine nets which could be over a kilometer long. The nets were woven from green flax, with stone weights and light wood or gourd floats, and could require hundreds of men to haul.

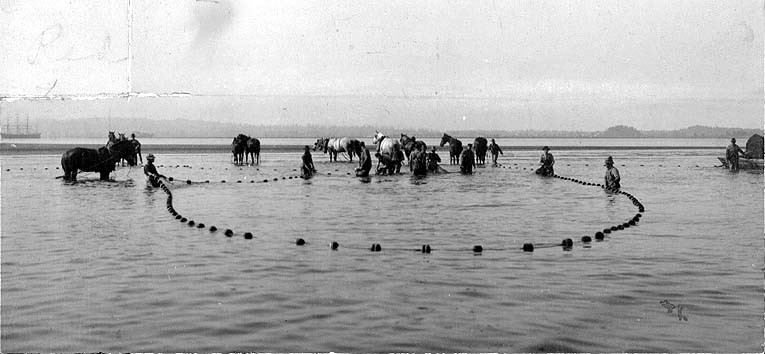
Haul seining with horses on the Columbia River

Native Americans on the Columbia River wove seine nets from spruce root fibers or wild grass, again using stones as weights. For floats they used sticks made of cedar which moved in a way which frightened the fish and helped keep them together.

Arrian's description of Alexander the Great's expedition on the Makran coast in 325 B.C. includes a detailed description of seine fishing by a tribe known as the Ichthyophagi (Fish-eaters).

Seine nets are also well documented in ancient cultures in the Mediterranean region. They appear in Egyptian tomb paintings from 3000 BCE. In ancient Roman literature, the poet Ovid makes many references to seine nets, including the use of cork floats and lead weights.

== Beach seine ==
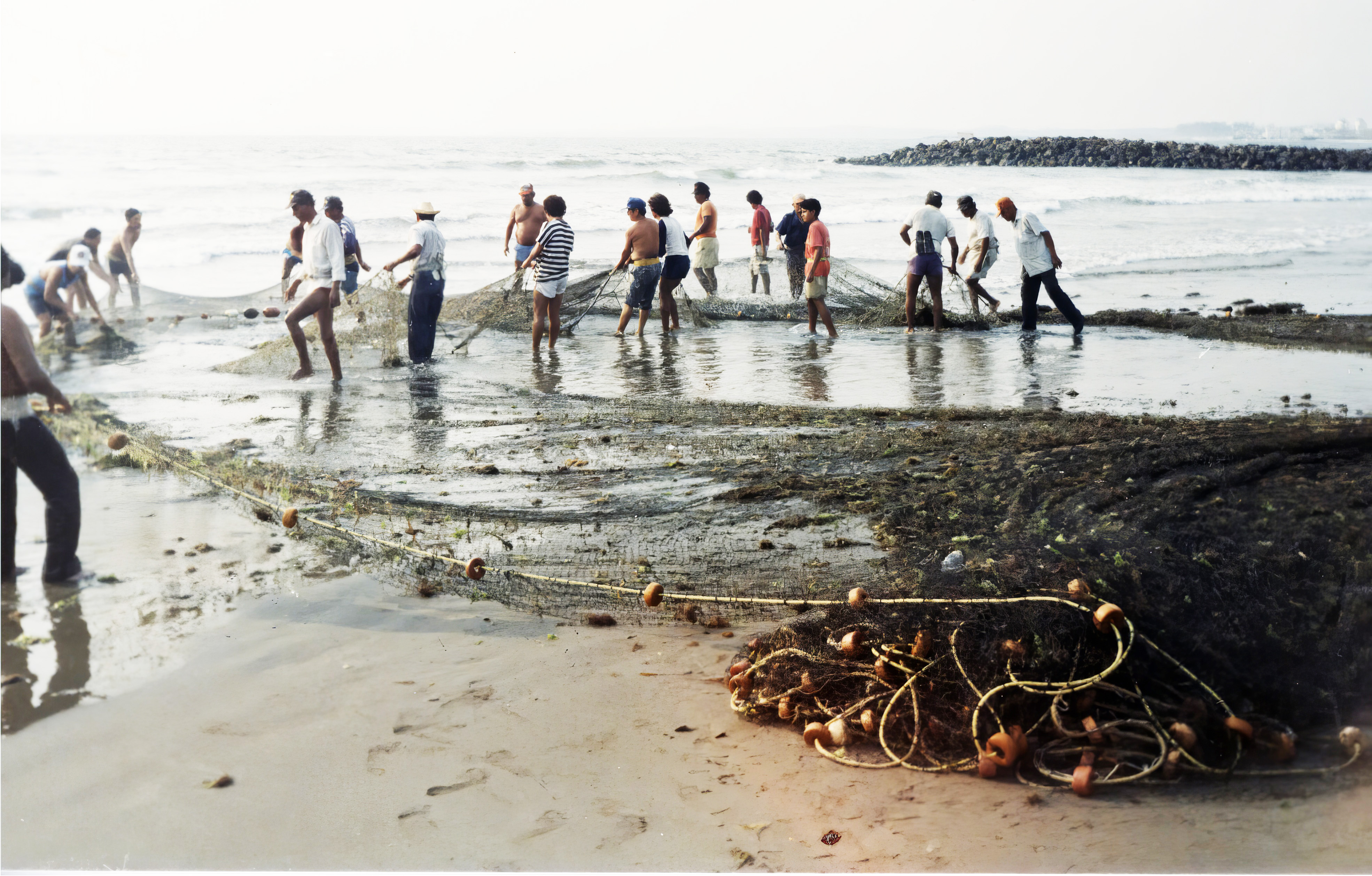
Seining at the Atlantic Ocean beach, St. Simons, Georgia, US, 1991

The beach seine is employed by anchoring a section of netting on the shoreline, then dragging the net into the water and surrounding the fish, before pulling it ashore. Several countries have prohibited the use of the seines; Kenya outlawed the use of beach seines in 2001.

== Purse seine ==
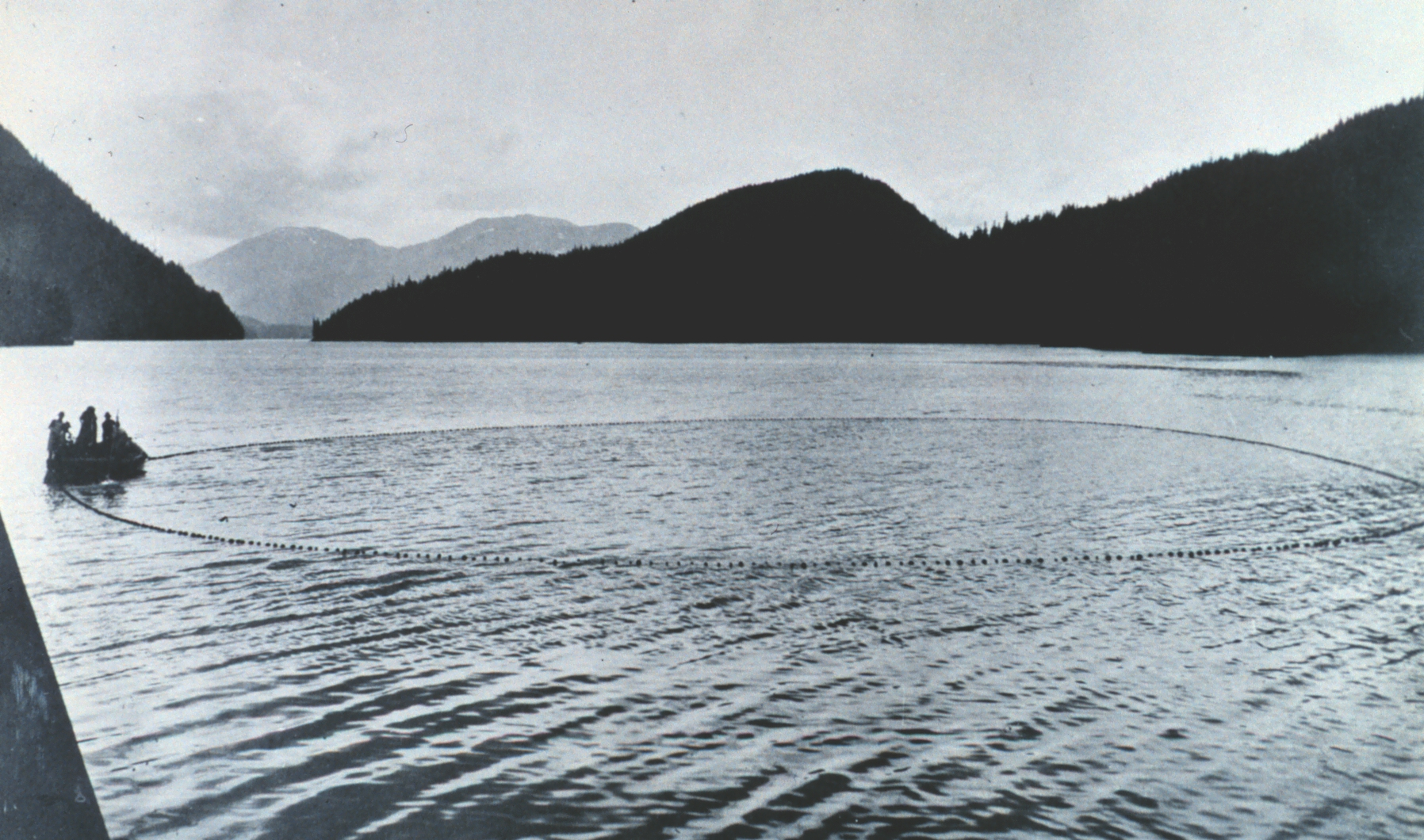
Fish swimming near the surface are surrounded by a wall of netting supported by floats.

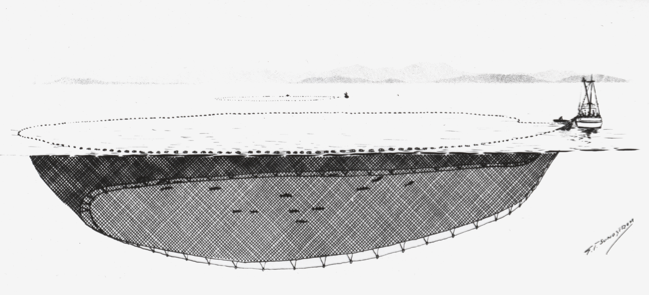
The net is drawn or "pursed" so it is closed at the bottom as well.

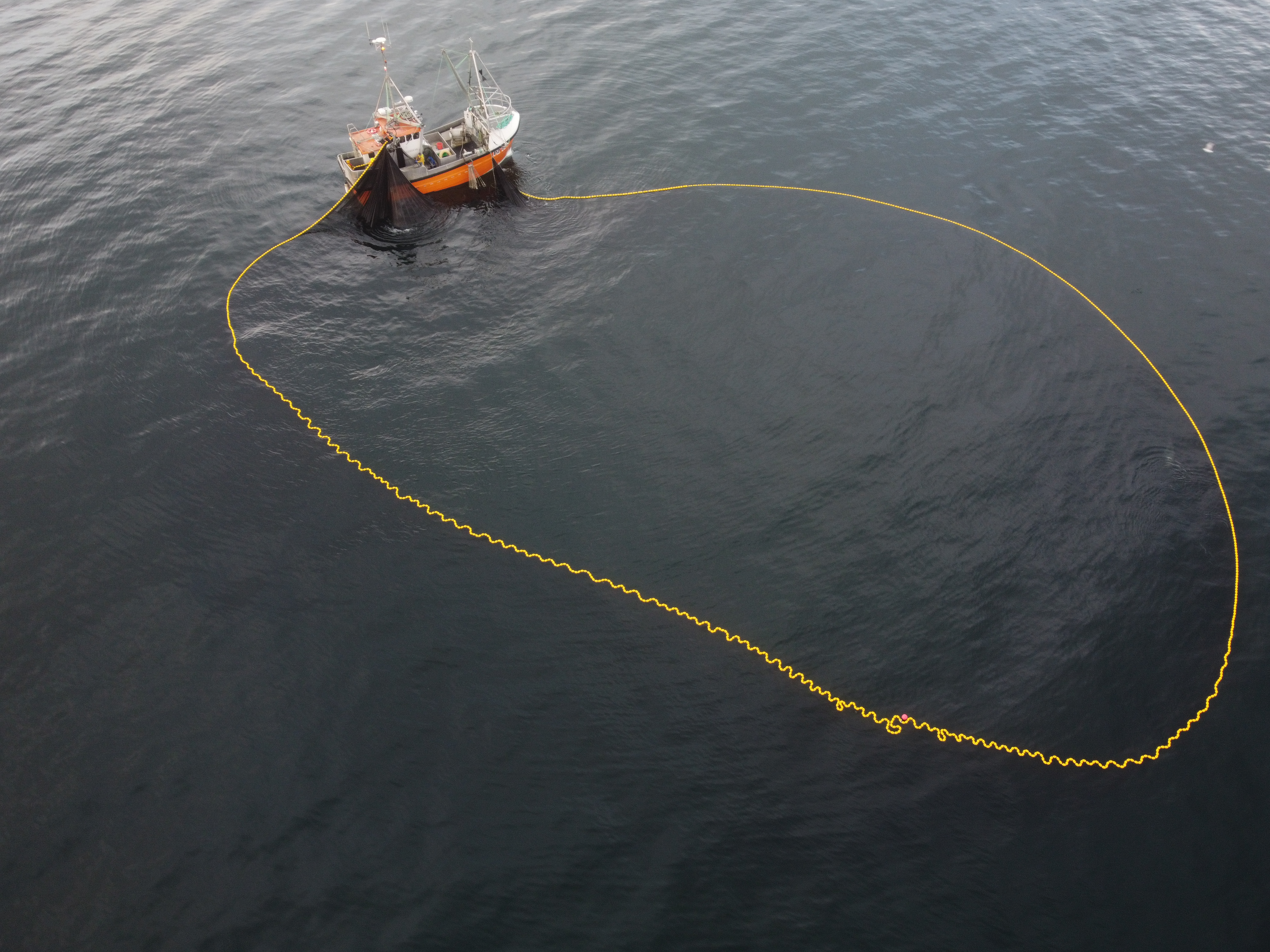
Ring netter operating in Mount's Bay, Cornwall

A common type of seine is a purse seine, named such because along the bottom are a number of rings. A line (referred to as a purse-line) passes through all the rings, and when pulled, draws the rings close to one another, preventing the fish from "sounding", or swimming down to escape the net. This operation is similar to a traditional style purse, which has a drawstring. The purse seine is a preferred technique for capturing fish species which school, or aggregate, close to the surface: sardines, mackerel, anchovies, herring, and certain species of tuna (schooling); and salmon soon before they swim up rivers and streams to spawn (aggregation). Boats equipped with purse seines are called purse seiners.

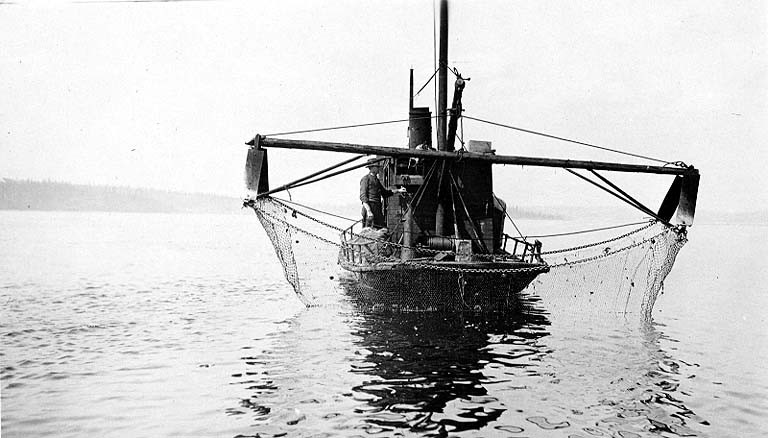
Purse seiner on the U.S. Pacific Coast

Purse seines are ranked by experts as one of the most sustainable commercial fishing methods when compared with other options. Purse seine fishing can result in smaller amounts of by-catch (unintentionally caught fish), especially when used to catch large species of fish (like herring or mackerel) that shoal tightly together. When used to catch fish that shoal together with other species, or when used in parallel with fish aggregating devices, the percentage of by-catch greatly increases.

Use of purse seines is regulated in many countries; in Sri Lanka, for example, using this type of net within 7 kilometres (3.8 nmi; 4.3 mi) of the shore is illegal. However, they can be used in the deep sea, after obtaining permission from authorities. Purse seine fishing can have negative impacts on fish stocks because it can involve the bycatch of non-target species and it can put too much pressure on fish stocks.

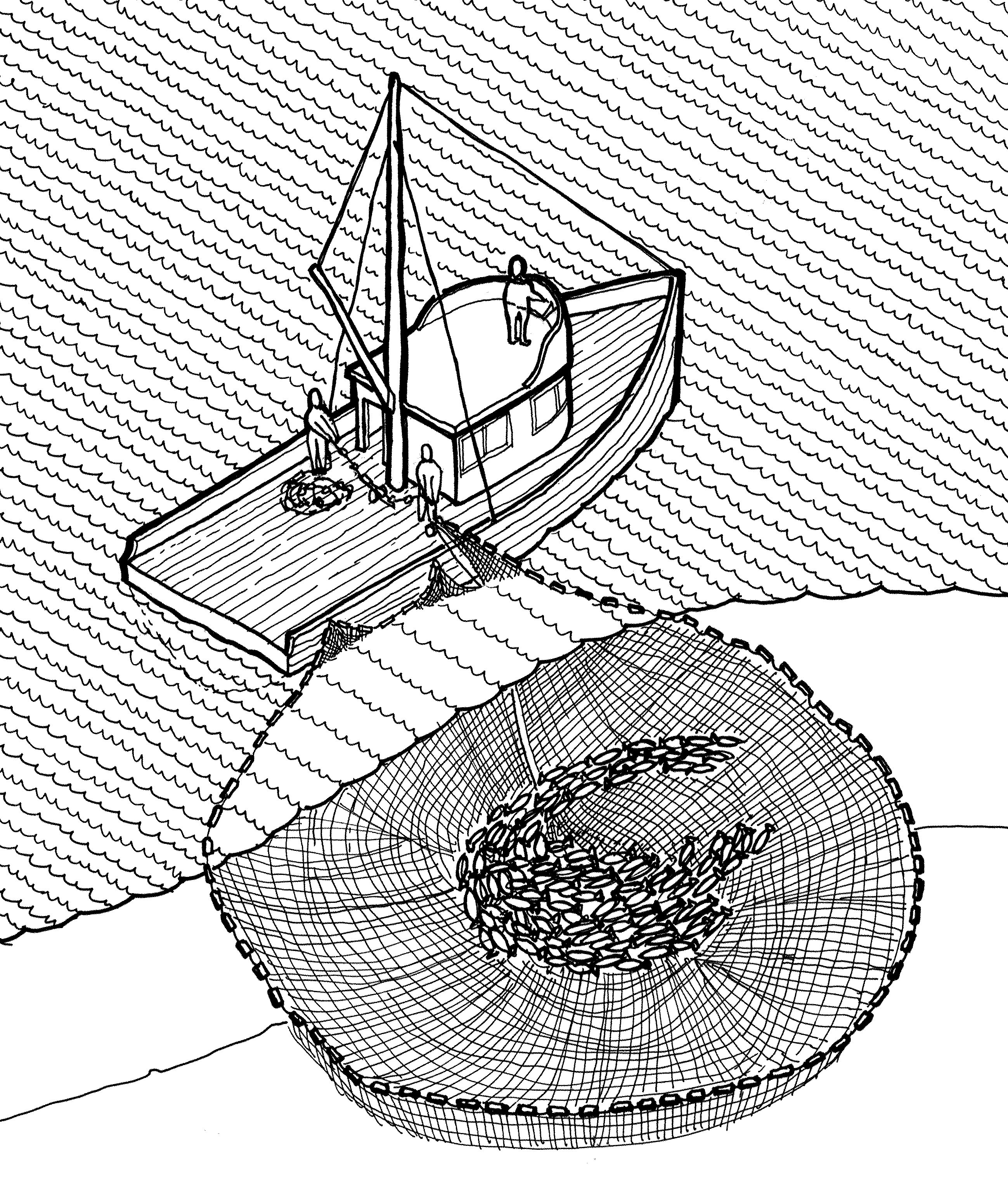
Purse seine boat encircling a school of fish

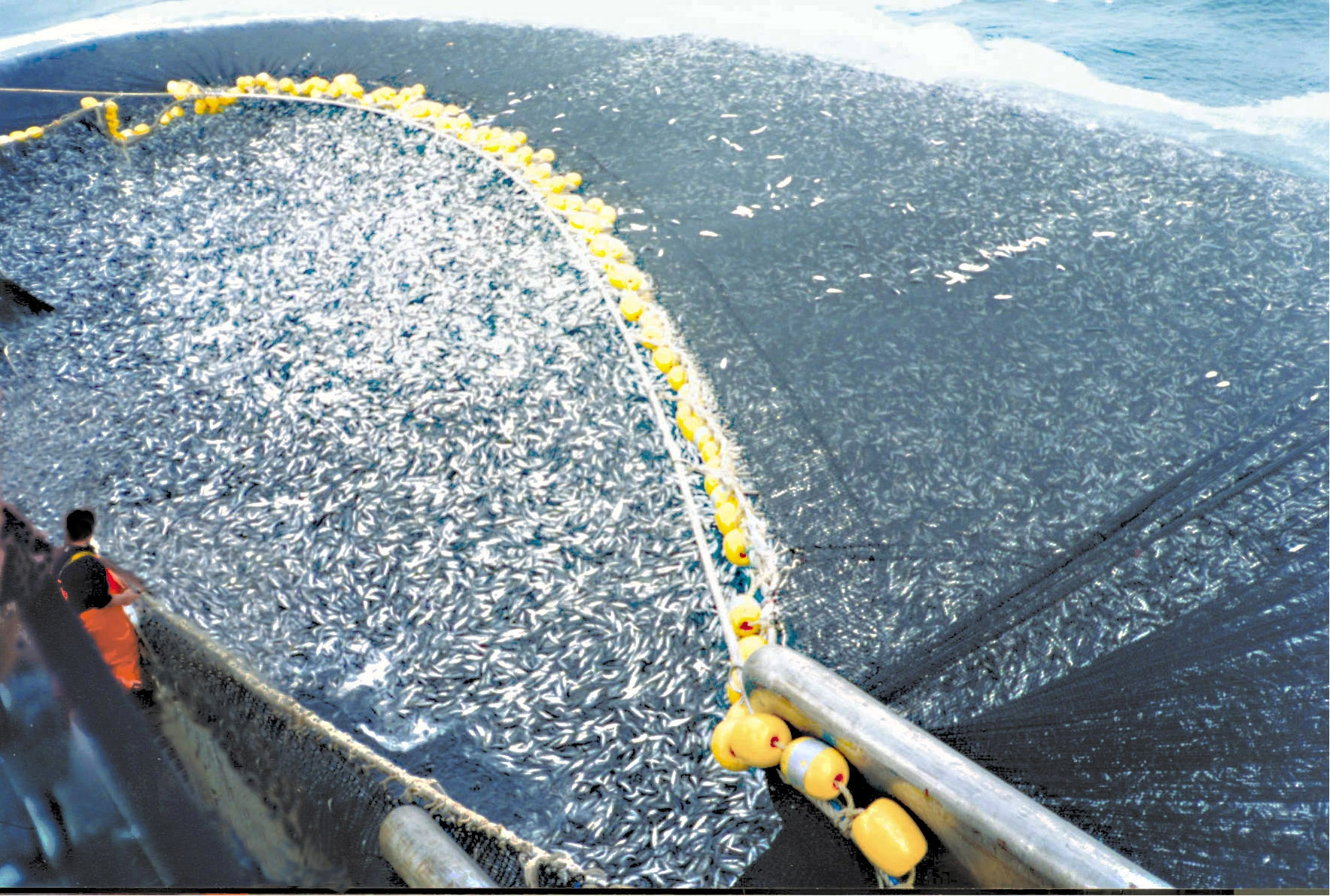
A school of about 400 tons of jack mackerel encircled by a Chilean purse seiner

=== Power block ===
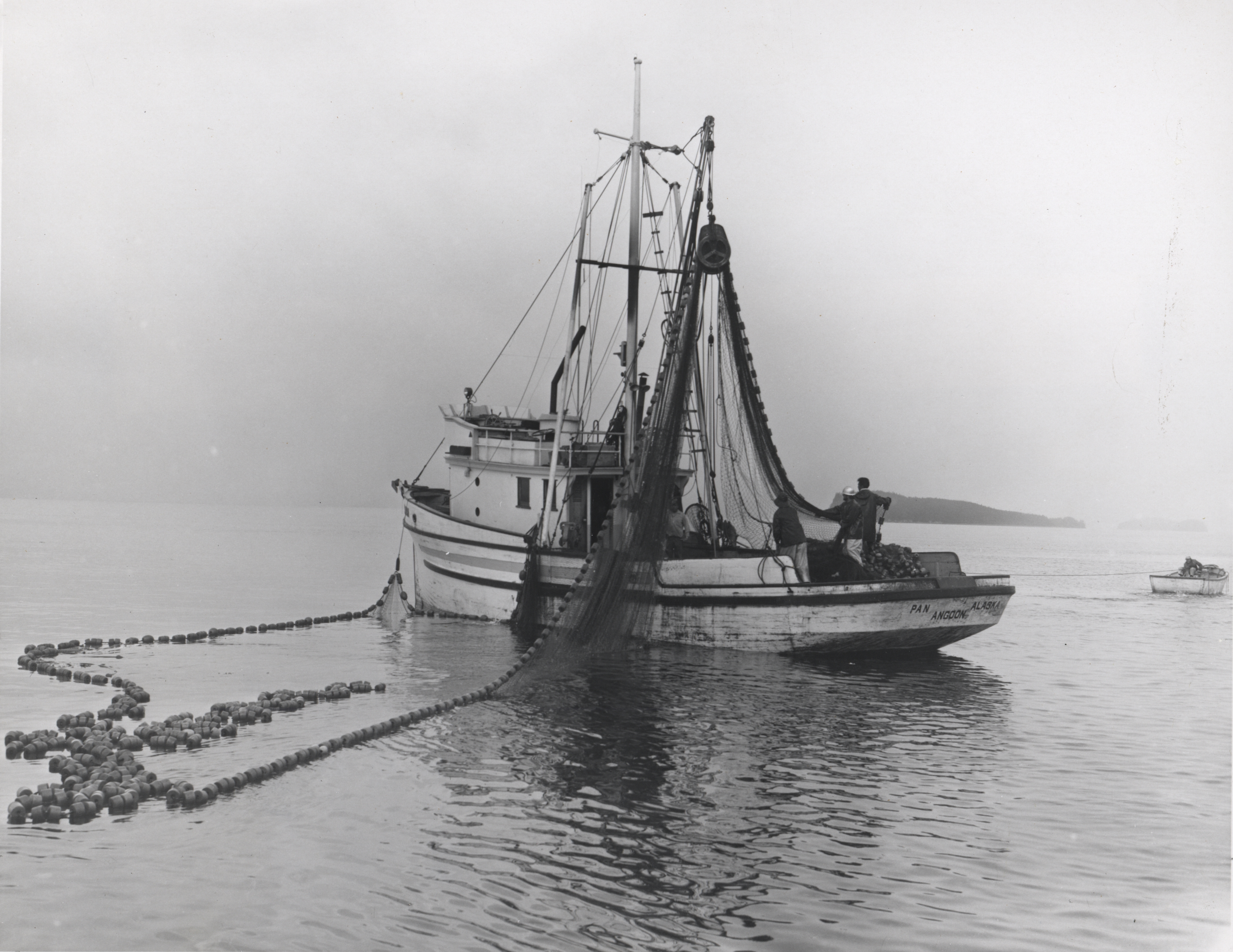
Salmon seiner with power block 1967

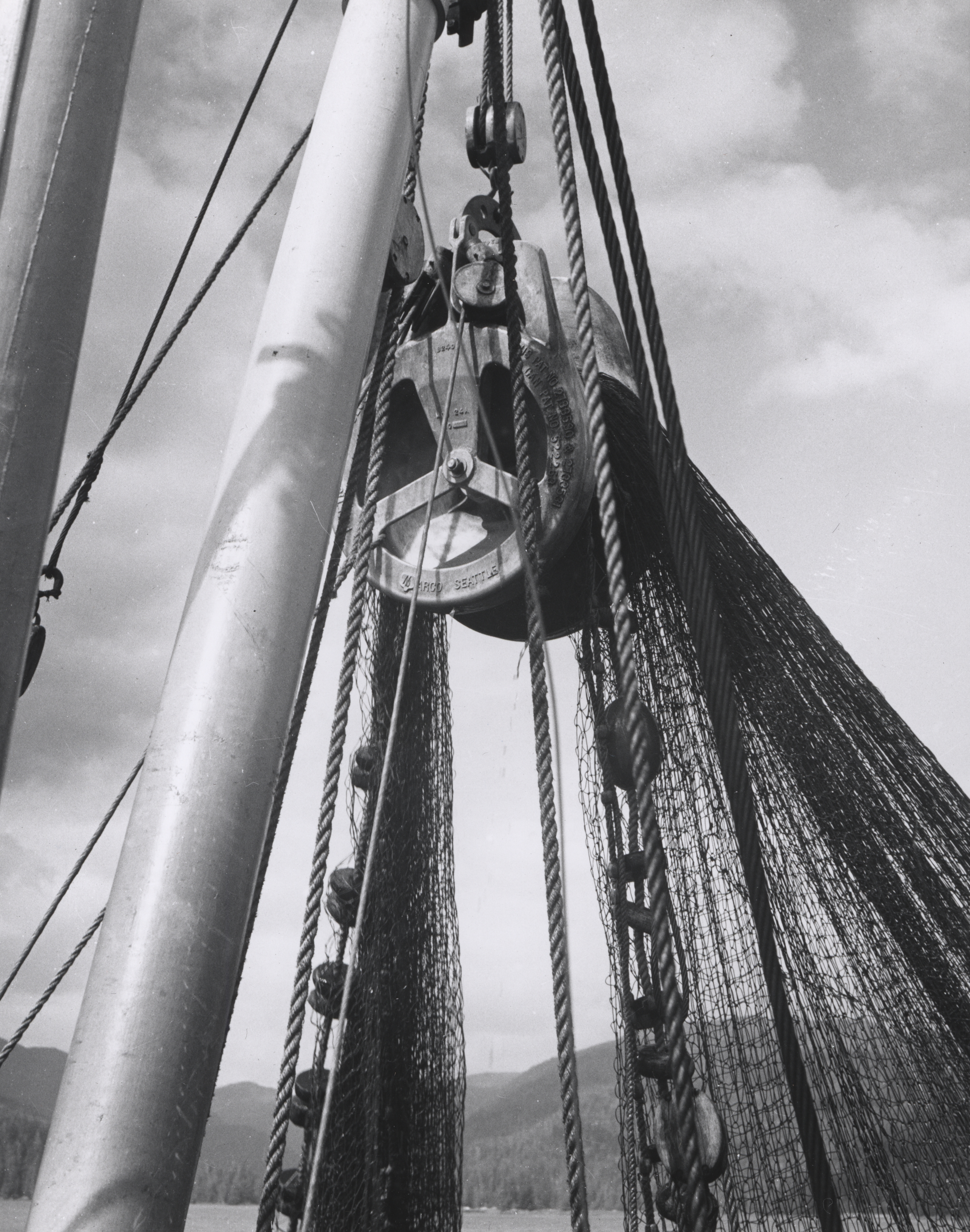
Closeup of the power block

The power block is a mechanized pulley used on some seiners to haul in the nets. According to the UN Food and Agriculture Organization, no single invention has contributed more to the effectiveness of purse seine net hauling than the power block.

The Puretic power block line was introduced in the 1950s and was the key factor in the mechanization of purse seining. The combination of these blocks with advances in fluid hydraulics and the new large synthetic nets changed the character of purse seine fishing. The original Puretic power block was driven by an endless rope from the warping head of a winch. Nowadays, power blocks are usually driven by hydraulic pumps powered by the main or auxiliary engine. Their rpm, pull and direction can be controlled remotely.

A minimum of three people are required for power block seining; the skipper, skiff operator, and corkline stacker. In many operations a fourth person stacks the leadline, and often a fifth person stacks the web.

=== Drum ===
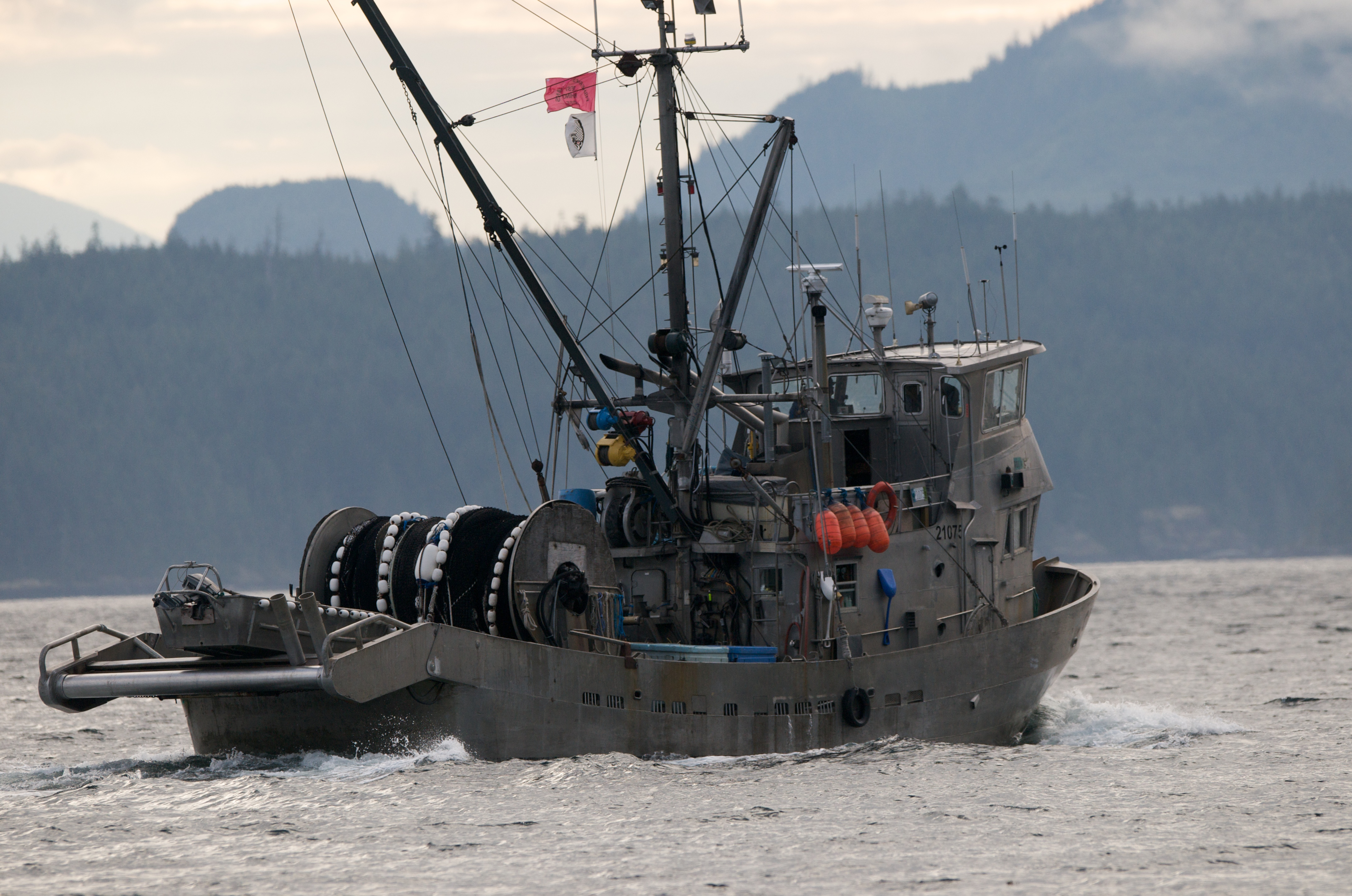
Drum net seiner in Johnstone Strait, British Columbia

In certain parts of the western United States as well as Canada, specifically on the coast of British Columbia, drum seining is a method of seine fishing which was adopted in the late 1950s and is used exclusively in that region.

The drum seine uses a horizontally mounted drum to haul and store the net instead of a power block. The net is pulled in over a roller, which spans the stern, and then passes through a spooling gear with upright rollers. The spooling gear is moved from side to side across the stern which allows the net to be guided and wound tightly on the drum.

There are several advantages to the drum seine over the power block. The net can be hauled very quickly - at more than twice the speed of using a power block, the net does not require overhead handling, and the process is therefore safer. The most important advantage is that the drum system can be operated with fewer deckhands. However, it is illegal to use a seine drum in the state of Alaska.

== Danish seine ==
A Danish seine, also occasionally called an anchor seine, consists of a conical net with two long wings with a bag where the fish collect. Drag lines extend from the wings, and are long so they can surround an area.

A Danish seine is similar to a small trawl net, but the wire warps are much longer and there are no otter boards. The seine boat drags the warps and the net in a circle around the fish. The motion of the warps herds the fish into the central net.

Danish seiner vessels are usually larger than purse seiners, though they are often accompanied by a smaller vessel. The drag lines are often stored on drums or coiled onto the deck by a coiling machine. A brightly coloured buoy, anchored as a "marker", serves as a fixed point when hauling the seine. A power block, usually mounted on a boom or a slewing deck crane, hauls the seine net.

Danish seining works best on demersal fish which are either scattered on or close to the bottom of the sea, or are aggregated (schooling). They are used when there are flat but rough seabeds which are not trawlable. It is especially useful in northern regions, but not much in tropical to sub-tropical areas.

The net is deployed, with one end attached to an anchored dan (marker) buoy, by the main vessel, the seiner, or by a smaller auxiliary boat. A drag line is paid out, followed by a net wing. As the seiner sweeps in a big circle returning to the buoy, the deployment continues with the seine bag and the remaining wing, finishing with the remaining drag line. In this way a large area can be surrounded. Next the drag lines are hauled in using rope-coiling machines until the catch bag can be secured.

The seine netting method developed in Denmark. Scottish seining ("fly dragging") was a later modification. The original procedure is much the same as fly dragging except for the use of an anchored marker buoy when hauling, and closing the net and warps and net by winch.

== Other images ==
Purse seining

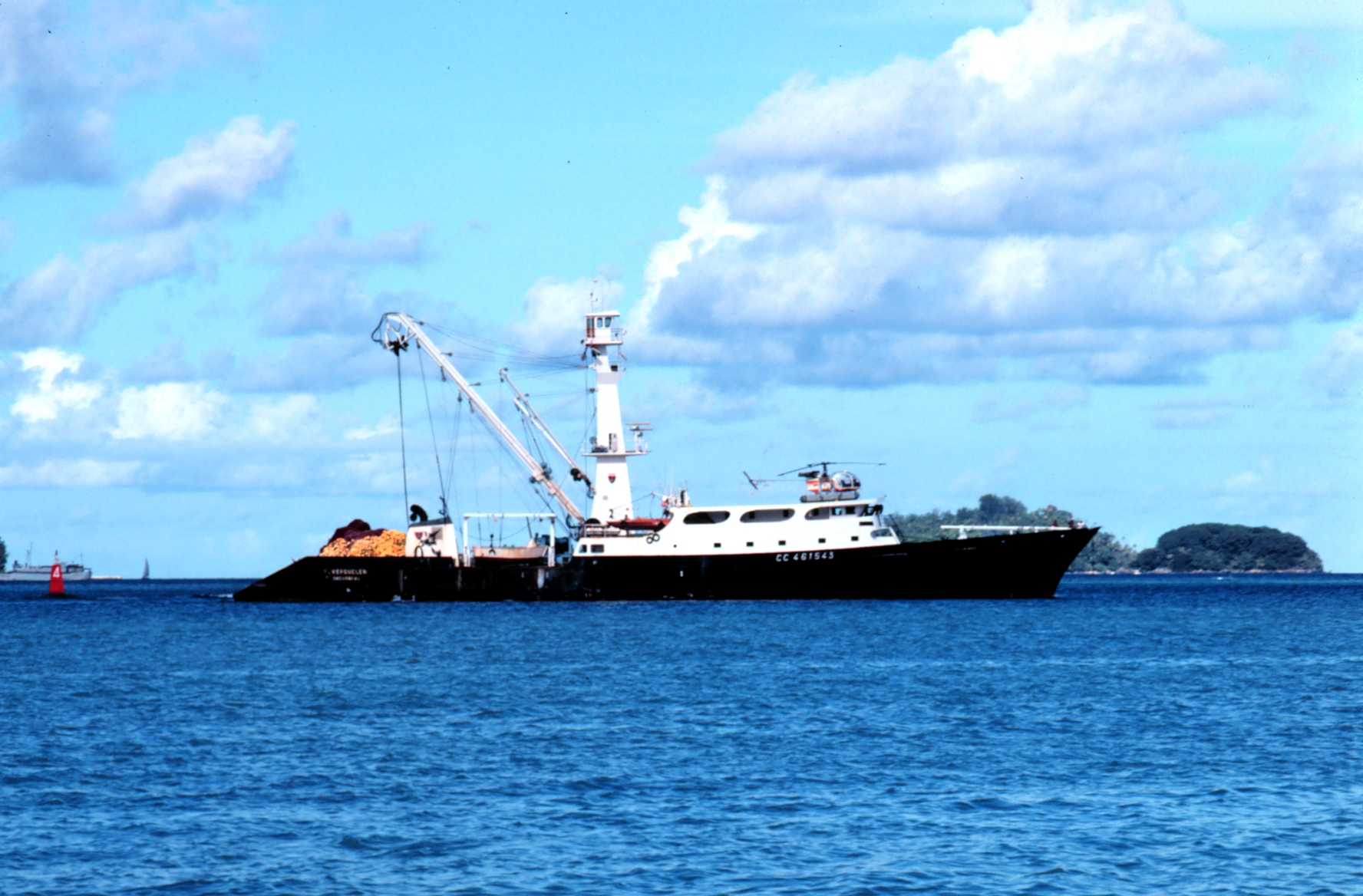
Modern French tuna purse seiner using a power block. The helicopter is used to search for tuna schools.

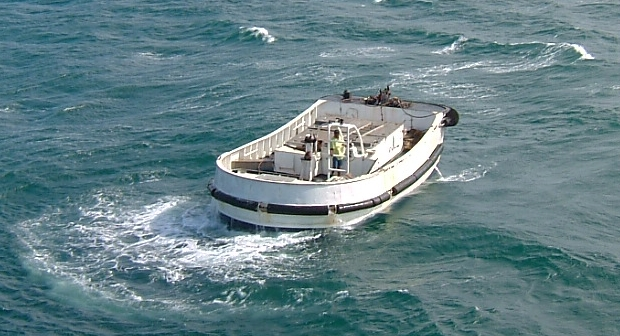
Skiff tuna purser

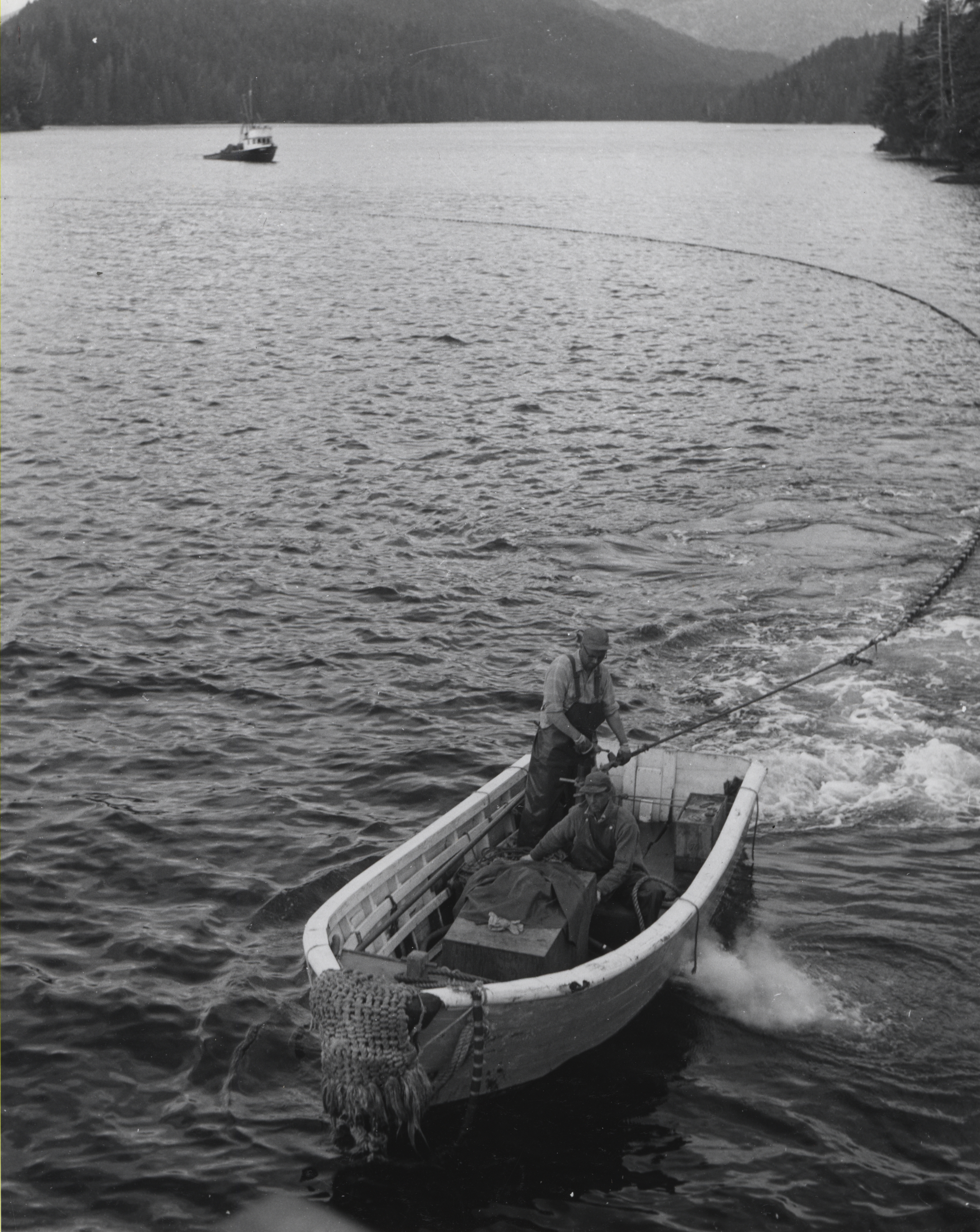
Seine skiff setting the net

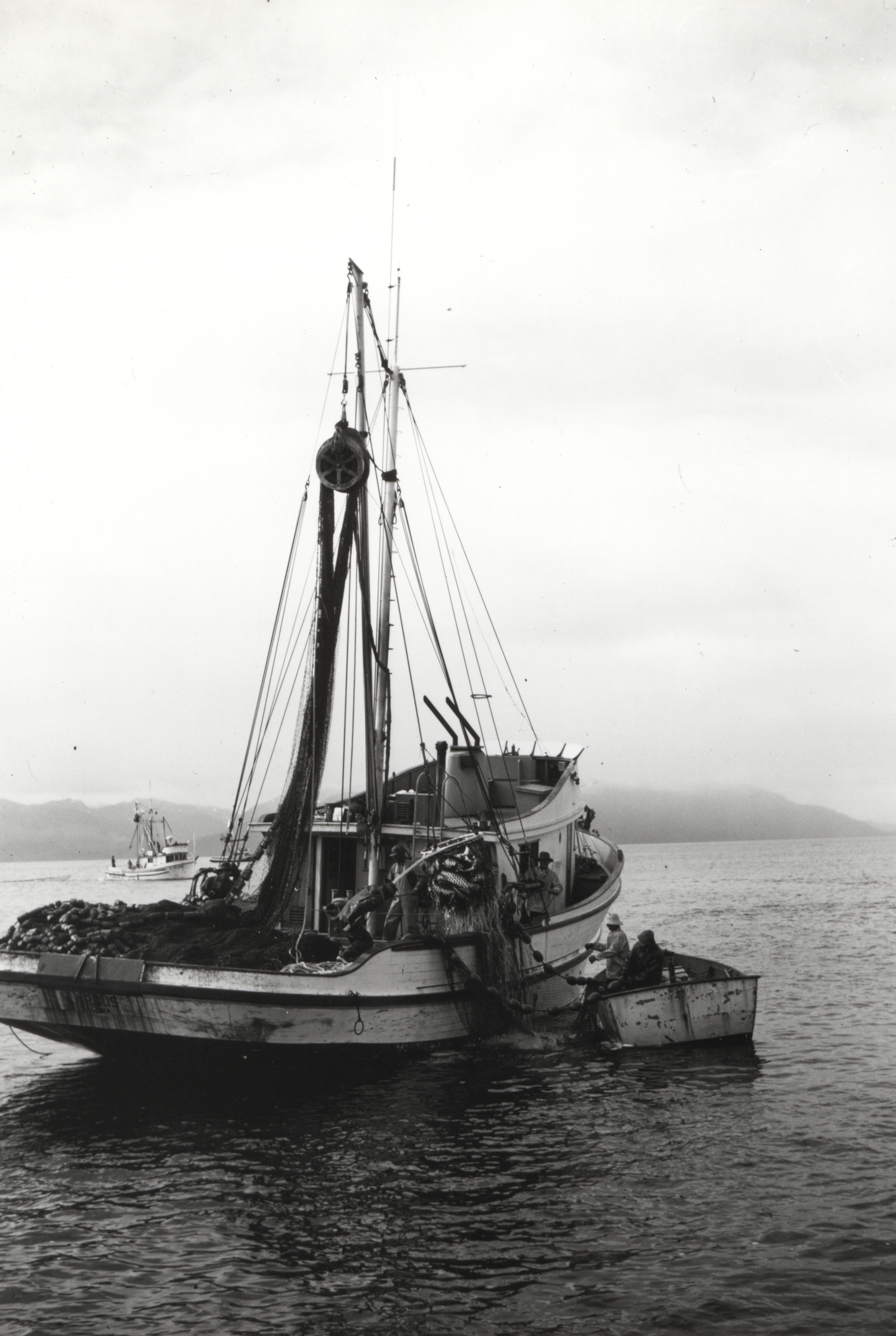
Brailing the salmon on board

Seining in the past

Early steam seine netter

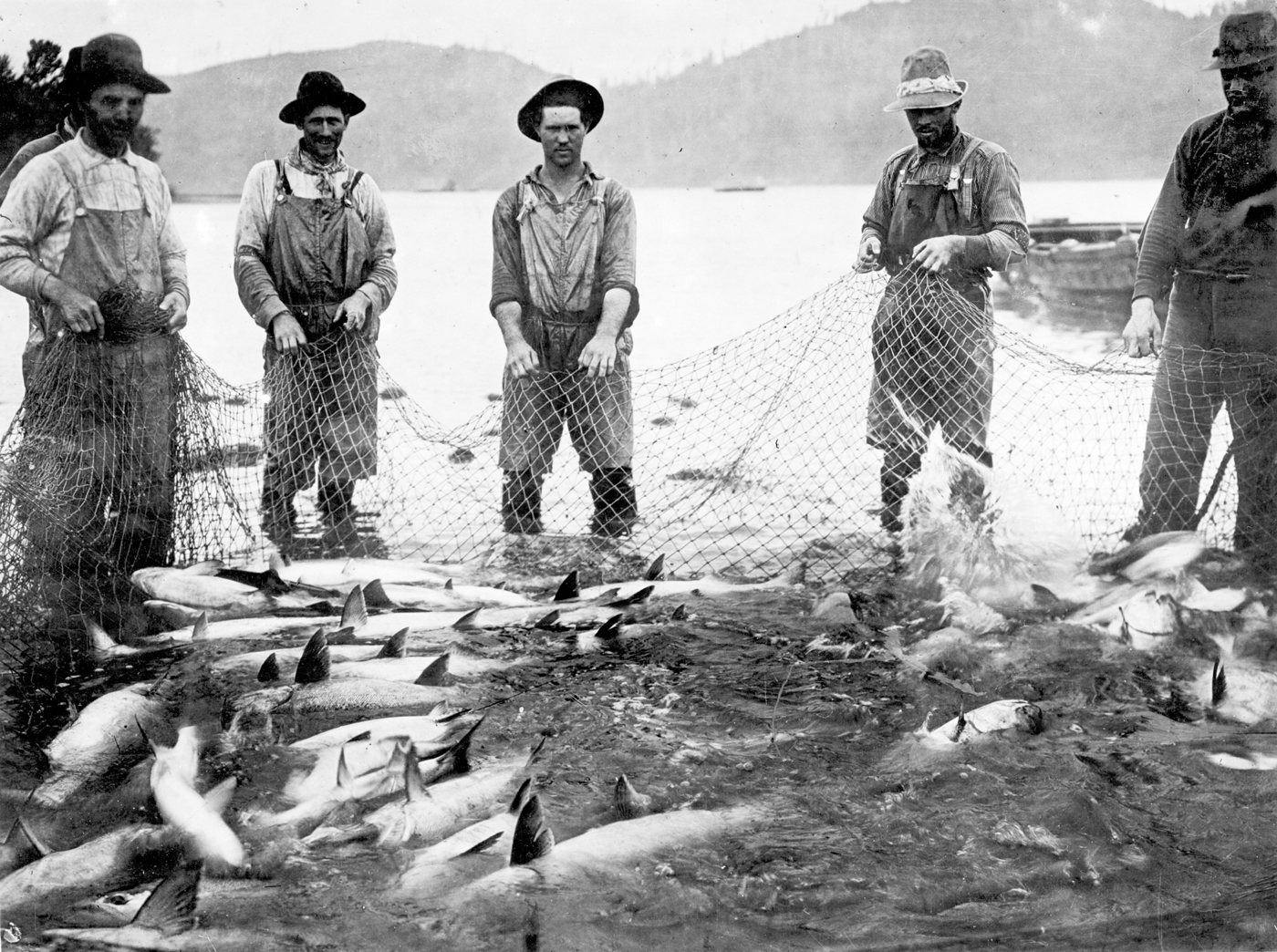
Manually seining salmon on Columbia River, Oregon, 1914

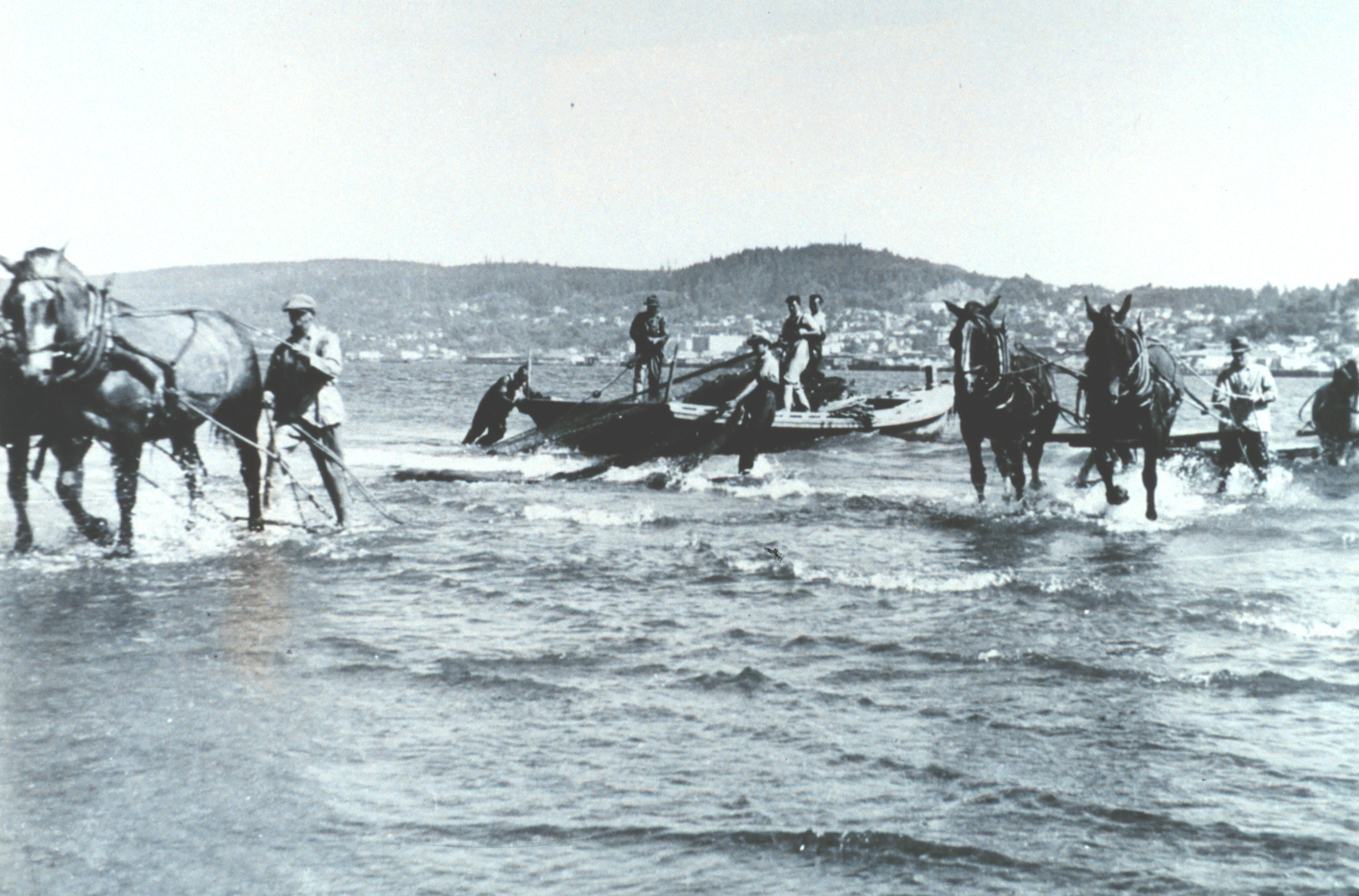
Hauling in a beach seine using horse teams 1938

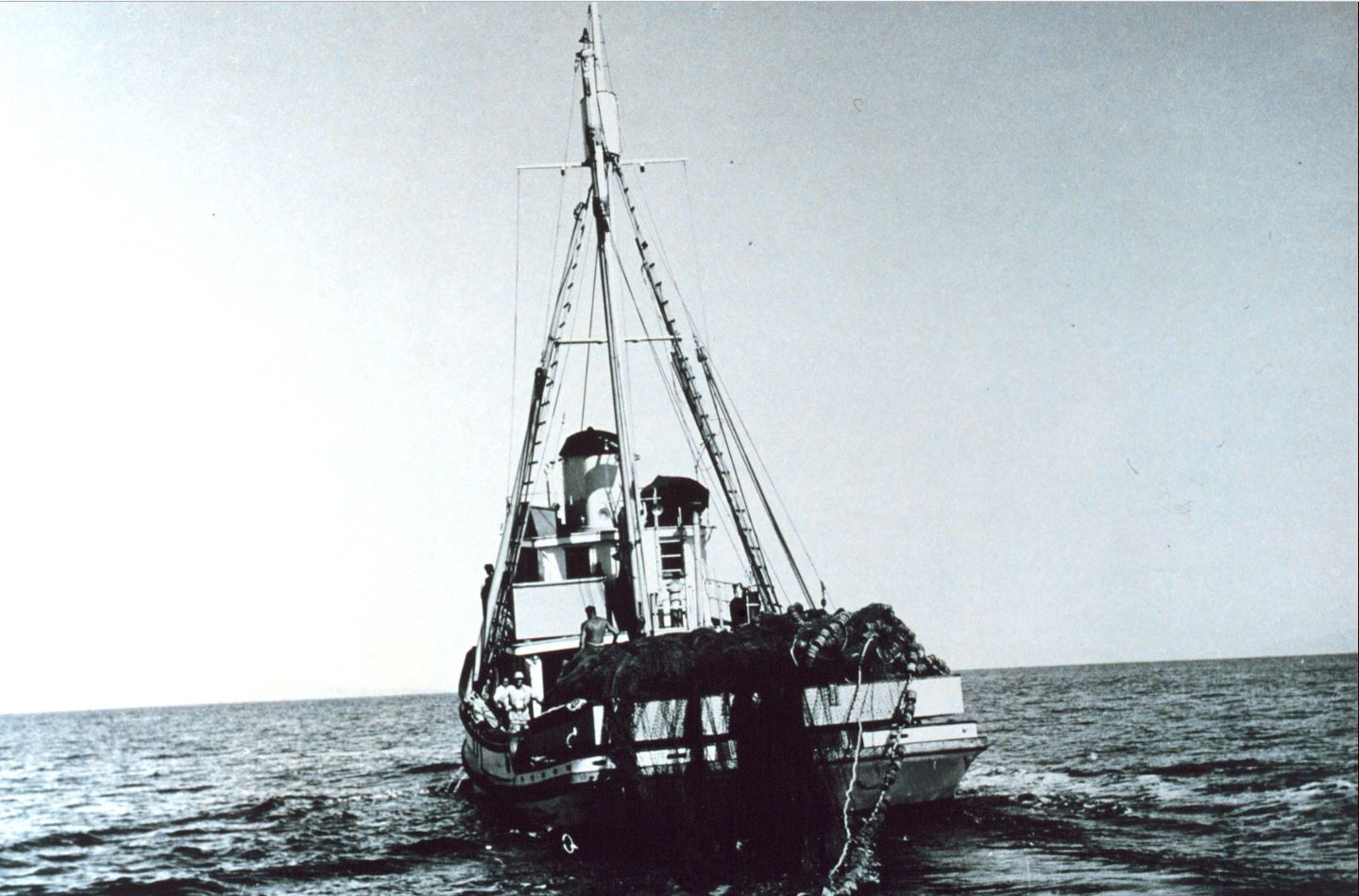
R/V John R. Manning starting a purse seine set in the tropical Pacific Ocean, ca. 1950.

== See also ==
- Seiners
