= Vladimir Parpura =

Croatian-American neurobiologist (born 1964)

Vladimir Parpura (born December 5, 1964) is a Croatian-American neurobiologist who is currently a professor at the University of Alabama at Birmingham and an elected fellow of the American Association for the Advancement of Science.

== Early life and education ==
Parpura was born was born December 5, 1964, in Split, Croatia. Following compulsory military service, he earned his M.D. at University of Zagreb in 1989, and later was awarded a doctorate in neurology and zoology at Iowa State University in 1993.

== Career and research ==
He taught at Iowa State University, and then in 2000 took a teaching position at University of California, Riverside. In July 2007, he accepted a position at the University of Alabama at Birmingham.

He was elected as a member of the Academia Europaea in 2012 and of the Dana Alliance for Brain Initiatives in 2016.

His interests are in ion channels, astrocyte-neuron glutamate-mediated signaling, synaptic function and Glial biology. His highest cited paper is "Tripartite synapses: glia, the unacknowledged partner" at 1662 times, according to Google Scholar.

== Selected publications ==
- Vladimir Parpura, Trent A Basarsky, Fang Liu, Ksenija Jeftinija, Srdija Jeftinija, Philip G Haydon. Glutamate-mediated astrocyte–neuron signalling. 369:6483. 744–747. Nature. 1994.
- Hui Hu, Yingchun Ni, Vedrana Montana, Robert C Haddon, Vladimir Parpura. Chemically functionalized carbon nanotubes as substrates for neuronal growth. 4:3. 507–511. Nano letters. 2004.
- Vladimir Parpura, Philip G Haydon. Physiological astrocytic calcium levels stimulate glutamate release to modulate adjacent neurons. 97:15. 8629–8634. Proceedings of the National Academy of Sciences. 2000.
- Alfonso Araque, Vladimir Parpura, Rita P Sanzgiri, Philip G Haydon. Glutamate‐dependent astrocyte modulation of synaptic transmission between cultured hippocampal neurons. 10:6. 2129:2142. European Journal of Neuroscience. 1998

== Awards ==
Parpura received the Nikola Tesla Award from the Yugoslav Academy of Sciences and Arts in 1988 and the Research Excellence Award from the Iowa State University in 1993.
