= Mario Puratić =

Mario Puratić (1904 - 1993) (usually spelled Puretic, and sometimes Puretich, in English) was a Croatian born American inventor who made major advances in fishing technology, such as the Puretic power block.

Puratić was born in 1904 in the town of Sumartin on the island of Brač in a Croatian family of farmers and fishermen. In 1938 he emigrated to the United States, worked at steel works and later in the harbour of Brooklyn. Looking for the open sea after World War II he moved to California, to San Pedro, where many people from Brač had moved to. He hired there on tuna fisher boats and trawlers. A good catch of fish, meant that many men were necessary to pull the net on board.

Within a few months, during 1953 in San Pedro he invented the Puretic power block. A job which once needed 8 to 10 people could now equally quickly be done with only 5 or 6 people, but still no one was interested in the product.

In 1955 the company Marco from Seattle, specialized in sea building and design, recognized the potential of his invention and its engineers produced a product for practical use called the Power Block. It has a form of evening pulley with aluminium skeleton and the central rotating element, often wrapped in hard rubber, which can work. Quality of the product was very quickly recognized and up until 1960, most fishing boats in the northern seine fleet had installed the power block. It made possible the renaissance of the moribund United States distant water tuna fleet, an event that put the United States into the forefront of the fishing world and has kept it there, helped by the adoption of synthetic fibers for netting.

Due to his invention, Peru increased its fishing pelagic fish by 300 percent.

The puretic power block revolutionized the fishing industry in such a way that FAO stated that no single invention has contributed more to the success of purse seine net hauling than extensive line of Power Blocks. In 1972 Canada issued a five-dollar bill with a salmon seiner on the reverse. In 1975, Mario Puratić was proclaimed the inventor of the year in the United States and also one among America's most famous 100 inventors of the 20th century.
