= Louis Lucas =

Californian wine grape grower

Louis Lucas was one of the early commercial wine grape growers in Santa Barbara County, considered a local pioneer in the field. He is currently co-owner of Lucas & Lewellen Vineyards.

== Early years ==
Lucas was born in Fresno CA in 1940 and spent much of his youth growing up in Delano CA. where his family worked in the table grape business. He graduated from the University of Notre Dame in 1963.

== Career ==
In 1970 Lucas and partners formed Tepusquet Vineyards becoming one of the first commercial wine grape growers in Santa Barbara County. In the early seventies he partnered to form Edna Valley Vineyards and expanded Tepusquet to include vineyards in the Shandon region near Paso Robles. In 1996 Lucas partnered with Judge Royce Lewellen to form Lucas & Lewellen Vineyards. The company owns three vineyards in Santa Barbara County producing 24 grape varietals, operates a winery in Buellton, CA and two tasting rooms in Solvang, CA.
