= Anthony Grbic =

American electrical engineer

Anthony Grbic from the University of Michigan, Ann Arbor, MI was named Fellow of the Institute of Electrical and Electronics Engineers (IEEE) in 2016 for contributions to the theory and design of electromagnetic metamaterials.
