= Puretic power block =

Winch used to haul nets on fishing ships

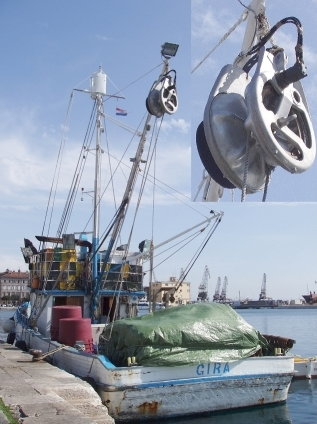
Puretic power block

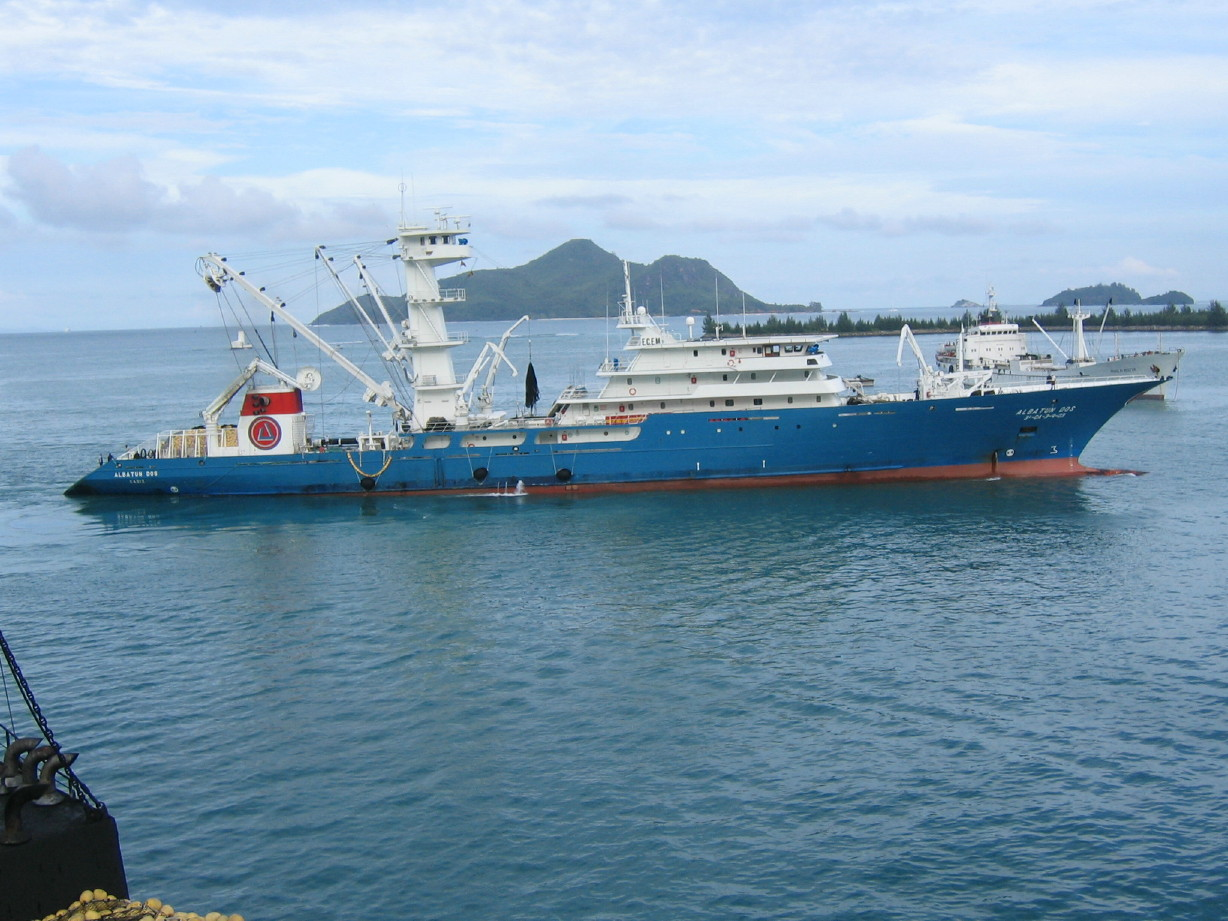
Large blue water tuna purse seiner. A Puretic power block can be seen at the top of the boom at the stern.

The Puretic power block is a special kind of mechanised winch used to haul nets on fishing vessels. The power block is a large pulley of aluminium with a hard rubber-coated sheave. While many men were needed for the back-breaking work of hauling a purse seine manually, the same work could be done by fewer men with a power block.

The Puretic power block revolutionized the technology of hauling fishing nets, particularly purse seine nets. According to the Food and Agriculture Organization of the United Nations (FAO), "no single invention has contributed more to the success of purse seine net hauling" than the power block, which was "the linch-pin in the mechanization of purse seining".

== History ==
The power block was invented by a Croatian fisherman, Mario Puratić, and patented in 1953. In English, Puratić is usually incorrectly spelt Puretic, sometimes Puretich.

While he was working as a tuna and sardine fisherman from San Pedro, California, Puratić started thinking about the difficulty of hauling seine nets. The original power block he designed was essentially a simple winch which used a V-shaped roller coated with hard rubber. It was suspended from a davit, and powered from the warp end of the winch by a looping rope. In 1954, the power block was trialled by American purse seiners in the Pacific. They have evolved since then, and nowadays power blocks are powered by hydraulic pumps. Their speed, torque and direction can be remotely controlled from the bridge during operations. As a result, retrieving the net is safer and requires less manual work.

Other important innovations of the same period were the development of synthetic fishing nets and sonar detection devices. The combination of the automated power block hauling synthetic nets with sonar sensing revolutionised the industry.

Salmon purse seining

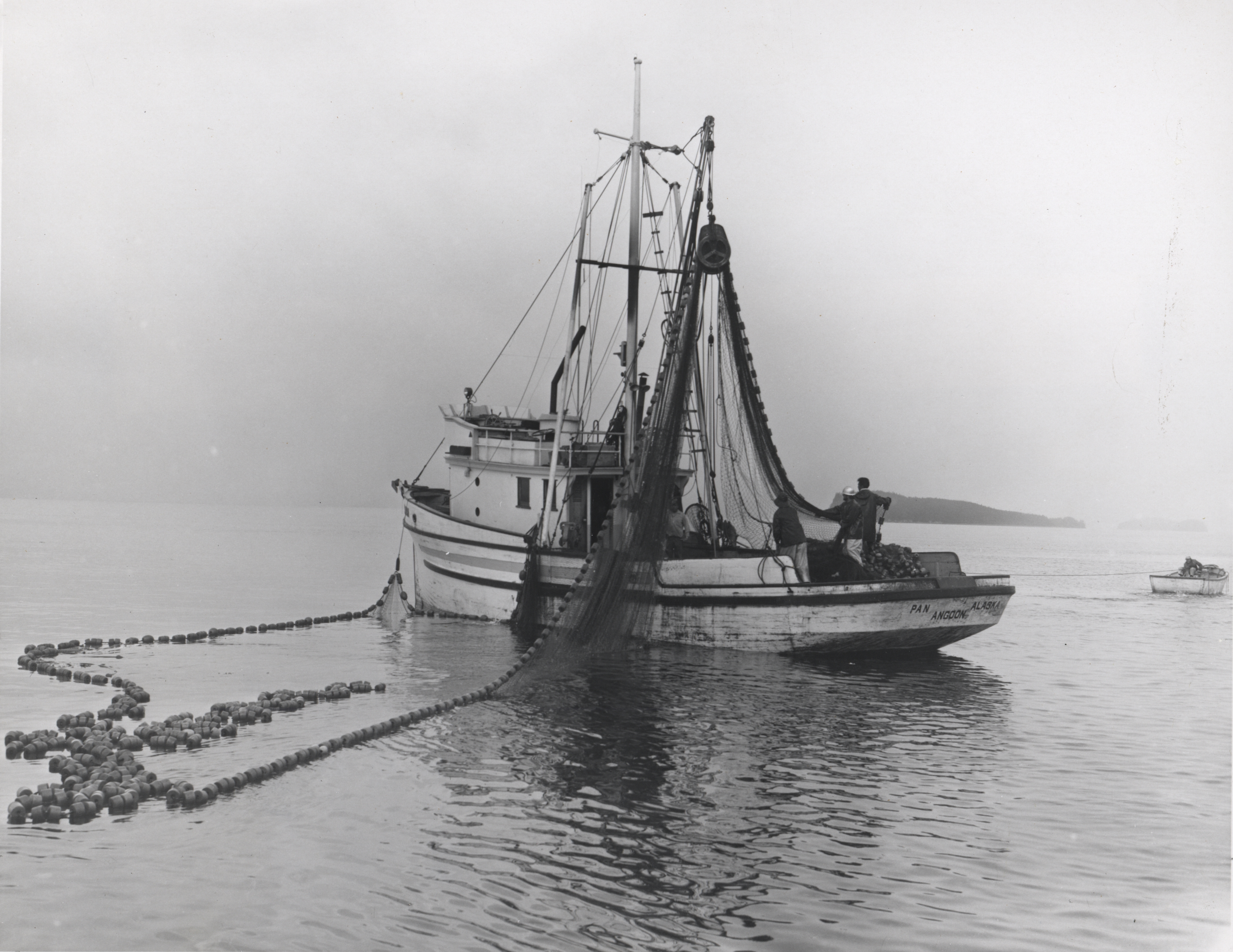
Salmon seiner with power block 1967

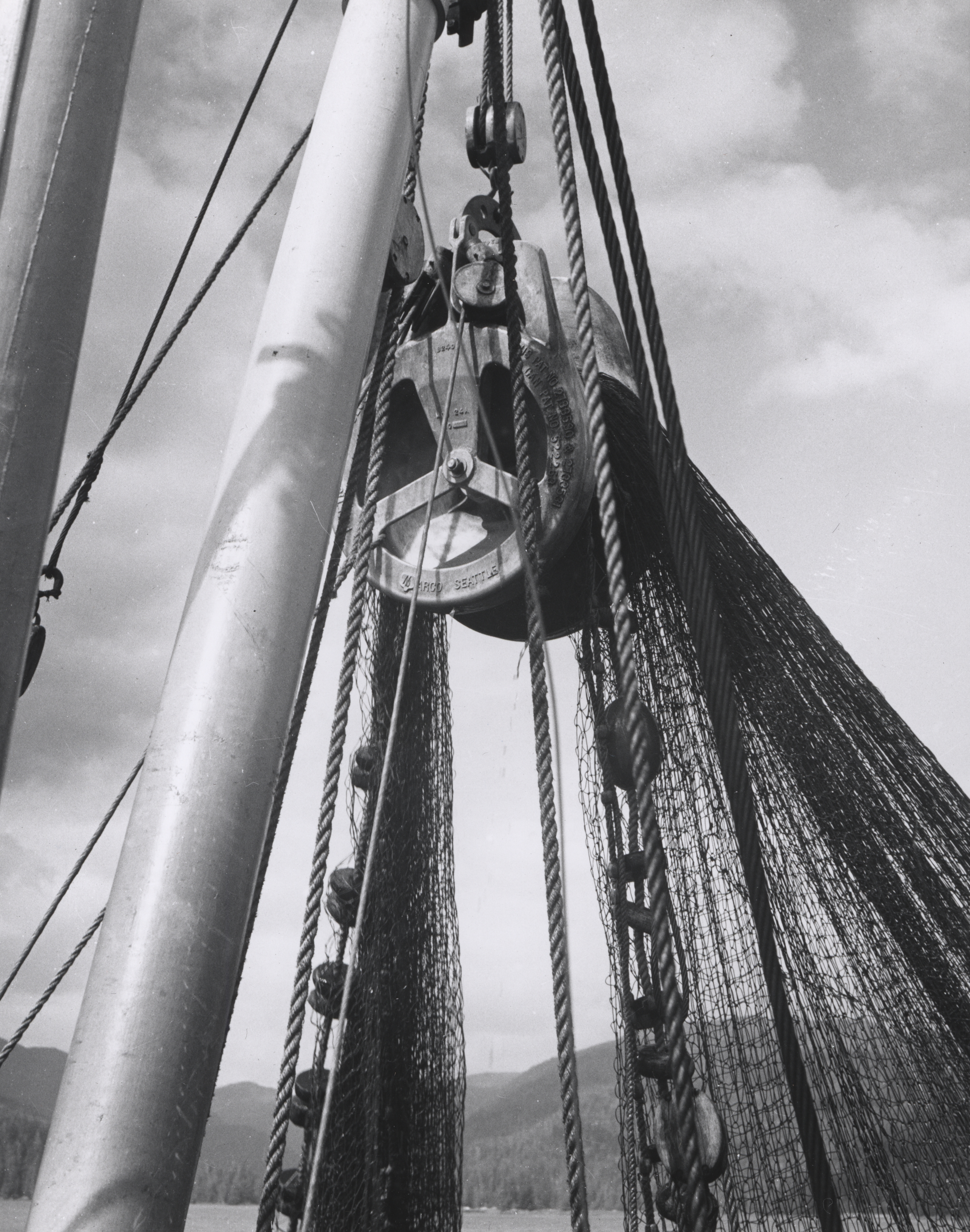
Closeup of the power block

The use of power blocks was found to have further advantages. It is possible to fish in rougher weather with the power block, because the steady force exerted by the net stabilizes the vessel. When deployments are made which miss the schooling fish, the net can be rapidly retrieved and redeployed on the same school. The power block also makes it easy to get nets aboard in emergencies, such as a sudden shift in tides or winds, or shark attacks on the catch and net.

On the other hand, the increase in the effectiveness of purse seine fishing led to herring schools choosing to school deeper in the water. Nets that could operate in deeper water needed to be bigger and heavier. That in turn meant bigger vessels, which pushed the smaller herring vessels out of business.

== Economic effects ==
Seine fishing industries rapidly recognized the value of the power block, and by 1960, most northern seine vessels were using the power block. Nowadays power blocks come with dozens of configurations and sizes. They are installed on over twenty thousand fishing vessels across the major purse seining fisheries around the world. These fisheries haul huge schools of tuna, salmon, herring, sardines, anchovies and menhaden from the sea, accounting for a large part the world's total fish catch.

Between 1969 and 1979, the Puretic power block was pictured on the reverse side of Canadian five dollar banknote issues. In 1975 Mario Puratić was given the National Inventor of the Year Award by the Intellectual Property Owners Education Foundation for his invention of the power block.

A 2022 paper claims the reduction in labour demand resulting from use of the power block means power blocks devalue black labour on white owned ships.
