= Jakša Cvitanić =

Jakša Cvitanić (born 1962 in Split, Croatia, Yugoslavia) is a Richard N. Merkin Professor of Mathematical Finance at the California Institute of Technology. His main research interests are in mathematical finance, contract theory, stochastic control theory, and stochastic differential equations.

From 1992 to 1999 he was an Assistant and Associate Professor of Statistics at Columbia University. From 1999 until 2005, when he joined Caltech, Cvitanić was a Professor of Mathematics and Economics at the University of Southern California. During the academic year 2012–2013 he was a professor of finance at EDHEC Business School in France. He was also the director of the Ronald and Maxine Linde Institute of Economic and Management Sciences. and the president of the Bachelier Finance Society.

Cvitanić has co-authored some fundamental papers on financial markets with portfolio constraints, transaction costs, and other market imperfections. He is the author of over fifty articles in academic finance, economics and mathematics journals,, a co-author, with Fernando Zapatero, of the textbook Introduction to the Economics and Mathematics of Financial Markets, and, with Jianfeng Zhang, of the monograph Contract Theory in Continuous-time Models. He was or has been a co-editor of Finance and Stochastics , Mathematical Finance, Mathematics and Financial Economics and Frontiers of Mathematical Finance.

Cvitanić earned a B.Sc. (1985) and M.Sc. (1988) in Mathematics from the University of Zagreb, Croatia, and a PhD in Statistics (1992) from Columbia University in New York City. He received the American Statistical Association Scholastic Excellence Award in 1992.

== Selected publications ==
- Introduction to the Economics and Mathematics of Financial Markets (with Fernando Zapatero). Cambridge, Mass.: MIT Press, 2004. ISBN 0-262-53265-4.
- Contract Theory in Continuous-Time Models (with Jianfeng Zhang). Springer Science+Business Media, 2013. ISBN 978-3-642-14200-0.
