= George M. Skurla =

Aeronautical engineer

George Martin Skurla (July 2, 1921 – September 2, 2001) graduated from University of Michigan in 1944 and was an aeronautical engineer with Grumman Corporation. He began his career as an apprentice engineer, rising through the ranks and in 1965 becoming Director of Operations at the Kennedy Space Center. He was responsible for overseeing the production of the Lunar Modules for the Apollo Program. In June 1973, he oversaw operations for the design and production of the F-14 Tomcat and A-6 Intruder aircraft. He was elected president of Grumman Corporation in 1985 and retired the next year after 42 years with Grumman Corporation. He died from pneumonia in Melbourne, Florida at Holmes Regional Medical Center at age 80. At Florida Institute of Technology in Melbourne, Florida, the aeronautics building is named after him, where he served on the Board of Trustees. Skurla is of Croatian descent.
