= W36 =

W36 may refer to:

- German minesweeper Minerva (W36)
- Kurrama language
- Ranru Station, in Hokkaido, Japan
- Watkins 36, a sailboat
- Will Rogers–Wiley Post Memorial Seaplane Base, in Washington state
