= Wiley Post =

American aviator (1898–1935)

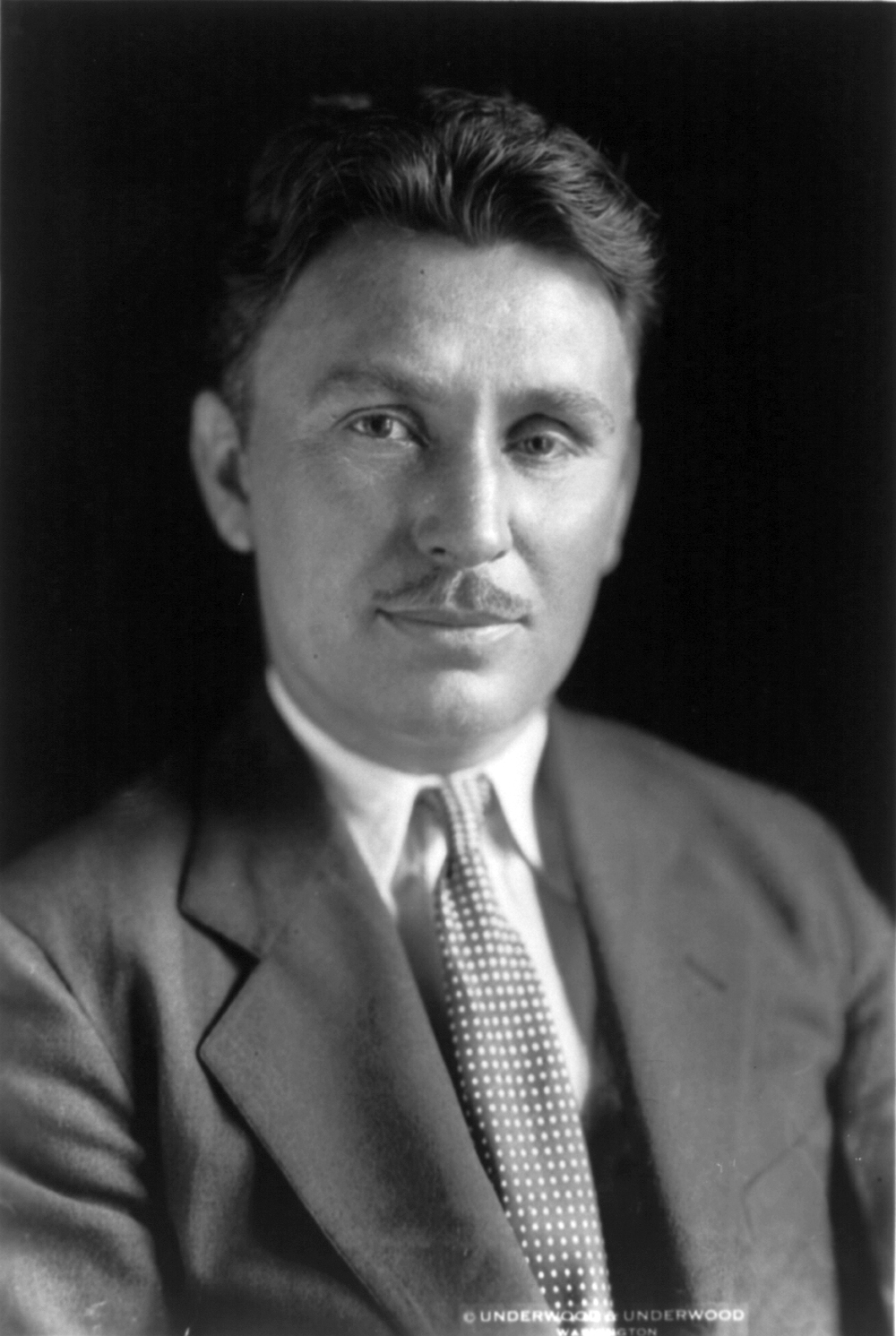
- Post in 1931
- Born: November 22, 1898; Corinth, Van Zandt County, Texas, US
- Died: August 15, 1935 (aged 36); Point Barrow, Territory of Alaska, US
- Occupation: Aviator
- Spouse: Mae Laine (m. June 27, 1927)

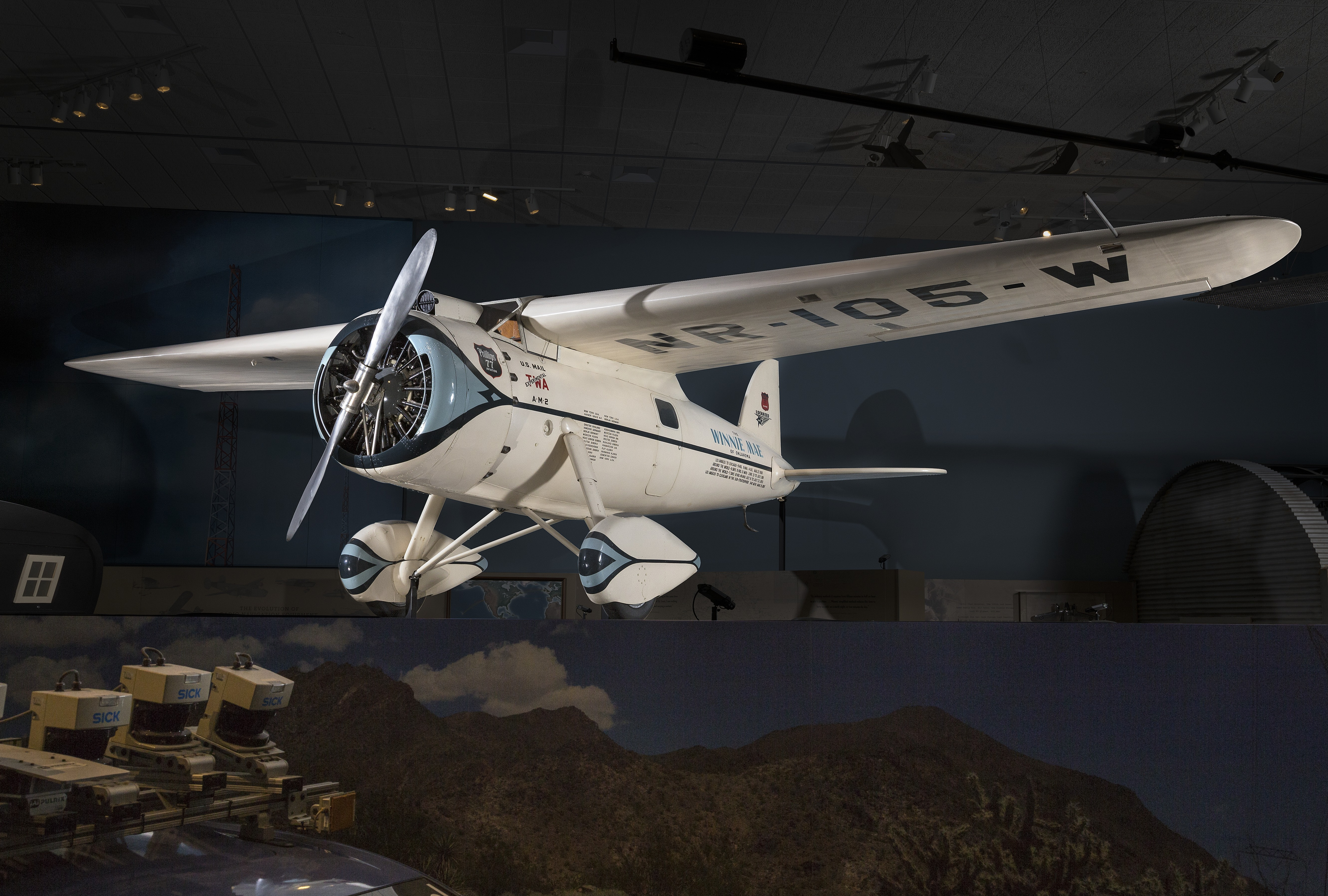
Winnie Mae, Wiley Post's Lockheed Vega on display at the Steven F. Udvar-Hazy Center

Wiley Hardeman Post (November 22, 1898 – August 15, 1935) was an American aviator during the interwar period and the first pilot to fly solo around the world. Known for his work in high-altitude flying, he helped develop one of the first pressure suits and discovered the jet stream. On August 15, 1935, he and American humorist Will Rogers were killed when his aircraft crashed on takeoff from a lagoon near Point Barrow in the Territory of Alaska.

Post's modified Lockheed Vega aircraft, the Winnie Mae, was on display at the National Air and Space Museum's Steven F. Udvar-Hazy Center from 2003 to 2011. It is now displayed in the "Time and Navigation" gallery on the second floor of the National Air and Space Museum in Washington, D.C.

== Early life ==
Post was born to parents who grew cotton on a farm near Grand Saline, Texas. His father was William Francis and his mother was Mae Quinlan Post, a person of mixed Cherokee heritage. His family moved to Oklahoma when he was five. He was an indifferent student but managed to complete the sixth grade. By 1920, his family had settled on a farm near Maysville, Oklahoma. (Note: There is disagreement about Wiley Post's birthplace. Some sources say it was Grand Saline, Texas. This is what Post says in his chapter on his early history in "Around the World in Eight Days". others claim he was born in Corinth, Van Zandt County, Texas. An old edition of the World Book claims it was Grand Plain, Texas. Even Maysville, Oklahoma has claimed the honor.)

In 1913, Post first saw an aircraft in flight at the county fair in Lawton, Oklahoma. It was a Curtiss-Wright "Pusher type". The event so inspired him that he immediately enrolled in the Sweeney Automobile and Aviation School in Kansas City. Seven months later, he returned to Oklahoma and went to work at the Chickasaw and Lawton Construction Company.

During World War I, Post wanted to become a pilot in the U.S. Army Air Service (USAS). Joining the training camp at the University of Oklahoma, he learned radio technology. Germany agreed to an armistice before he completed his training. The war ended, and he went to work as a "roughneck" in the Oklahoma oilfields. The work was unsteady, so he turned briefly to armed robbery. He was arrested in 1921 and sent to the Oklahoma State Reformatory, serving more than a year there. He was paroled in summer 1922.

== Early flying career ==
Post's aviation career began at age 26 as a parachutist for a flying circus, Burrell Tibbs and His Texas Topnotch Fliers, and he became well-known on the barnstorming circuit. On October 1, 1926, he was badly injured in an oil-rig accident when a piece of metal pierced his left eye. An infection permanently blinded him in it, and he typically wore an eyepatch thereafter. He used the settlement money to buy his first aircraft.

Around this time, Post met Will Rogers when he flew the fellow Oklahoman to a rodeo, and they eventually became close friends.

Post was the personal pilot of wealthy Oklahoma oilmen Powell Briscoe and F.C. Hall in 1930, when Hall bought a high-wing, single-engine Lockheed Vega, one of the most famous record-breaking aircraft of the early 1930s. The oilman nicknamed it the Winnie Mae after his daughter, and Post achieved national prominence by flying it from Los Angeles to Chicago to win the National Air Race Derby. The fuselage was inscribed "Los Angeles to Chicago 9 hrs. 8 min. 2 sec. August 27, 1930." Post earned a prize of $7,500, the equivalent of $112,053 in 2020.

=== Around the world ===
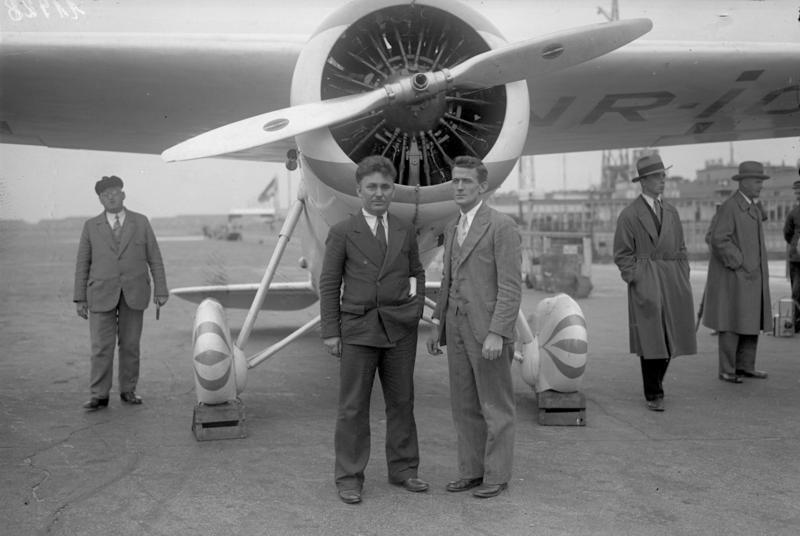
Wiley Post with Harold Gatty in Germany, 1931

In 1930, the record for flying around the world was not held by a fixed-wing aircraft, but by the Graf Zeppelin, piloted by Hugo Eckener in 1929 with a time of 21 days. On June 23, 1931, Post and the Australian navigator Harold Gatty left Roosevelt Field on Long Island, New York, in the Winnie Mae with a flight plan that would take them around the world, stopping at Harbour Grace, Flintshire, Hanover twice, Berlin, Moscow, Novosibirsk, Irkutsk, Blagoveshchensk, Khabarovsk, Nome (where his propeller had to be repaired), Fairbanks (where the propeller was replaced), Edmonton, and Cleveland before returning to Roosevelt Field.

They arrived back on July 1, after traveling 15,474 miles (24,903 km) in the record time of 8 days and 15 hours and 51 minutes, in the first successful aerial circumnavigation by a single-engined monoplane. The reception they received rivaled Charles Lindbergh's everywhere they went. They had lunch at the White House on July 7, rode in a ticker-tape parade the next day in New York City, and were honored at a banquet given by the Aeronautical Chamber of Commerce of America at the Hotel Astor. After the flight, Post acquired the Winnie Mae from F.C. Hall. He and Gatty published an account of their journey, titled Around the World in Eight Days, with an introduction by Will Rogers.

=== First solo pilot ===
After the record-setting flight, Post wanted to open his own aeronautical school, but could not raise enough financial support because of doubts many had about his rural background and limited formal education. Motivated by his detractors, he decided to attempt a solo flight around the world and to break his previous speed record. Over the next year, he improved his aircraft by installing an autopilot device and a radio direction finder, that were in their final stages of development by the Sperry Gyroscope Company and the United States Army.

In 1933, Post repeated his flight around the world, this time using the auto-pilot and compass in place of his navigator and becoming the first to accomplish the feat alone. He departed from Floyd Bennett Field and continued on to Berlin where repairs were attempted to his autopilot, stopped at Königsberg to replace some forgotten maps, Moscow for more repairs to his autopilot, Novosibirsk, Irkutsk for final repairs to the autopilot, Rukhlovo, Khabarovsk, Flat where his propeller had to be replaced, Fairbanks, Edmonton, and back to Floyd Bennett Field. Fifty thousand people greeted him on his return on July 22 after 7 days, 18 hours, 49 minutes.

== Pressure suit ==
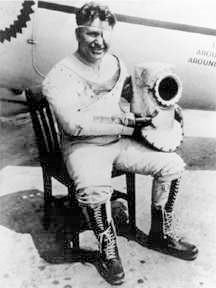
Post in his third pressure suit

In 1934, with financial support from Frank Phillips of the Phillips Petroleum Company, Post began exploring the limits of high-altitude long-distance flight. The Winnie Mae's cabin could not be pressurized, so he worked with Russell S. Colley of the B.F. Goodrich Company to develop what became the world's first practical pressure suit. Three pressure suits were fabricated for Post. Only the final version was successful. The first suit ruptured during a pressure test. The redesigned second suit used the same helmet as the first but when tested was too tight. They were unable to remove it from Post, so they had to cut him out, destroying the suit. The third suit was redesigned from the previous two.

The body of the suit had three layers: long underwear, an inner black rubber air pressure bladder, and an outer layer made of rubberized parachute fabric. The outer layer was glued to a frame with arm and leg joints that allowed him to operate the flight controls and to walk to and from the aircraft. Attached to the frame were pigskin gloves, rubber boots, and an aluminum-and-plastic diver's helmet.

The helmet had a removable faceplate that could be sealed at a height of 17,000 ft (5,200 m), and could accommodate earphones and a throat microphone. The helmet was cylinder-shaped with a circular window. In the first flight using the suit on September 5, 1934, Post reached an altitude of 40,000 ft (12,000 m) above Chicago. Eventually flying as high as 50,000 ft (15,000 m), he discovered the jet stream and made the first major practical advances in pressurized flight. The suit is in the collection of the Smithsonian National Air and Space Museum.

=== Attempted high altitude non-stop transcontinental flights ===
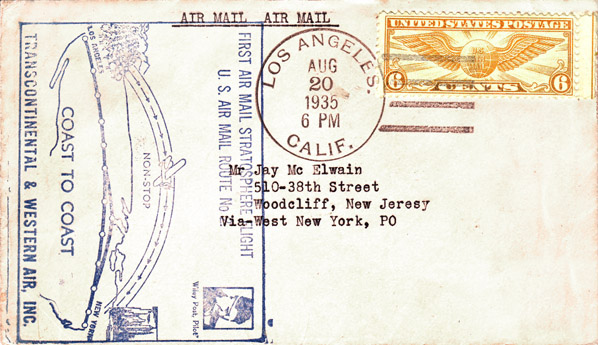
A cover flown by Post on all four of his attempts to make the first high altitude non-stop transcontinental flight from Los Angeles to New York, February–June 1935

Between February 22 and June 15, 1935, Post made four unsuccessful attempts to complete the first high altitude non-stop flight from Los Angeles to New York, all of which failed for various mechanical reasons. The first attempt on February 22 ended 57.5 miles north of Los Angeles at Muroc Field, CA (Now Edwards AFB). This was followed by attempts on March 15 (Cleveland, Ohio; 2,035 miles), April 14 (Lafayette, Indiana; 1,760 miles), and June 15 (Wichita, KS; 1,188 miles).

As the attempts were meant to be the "First Air Mail Stratosphere Flight" over U.S. Air Mail Route #2 (AM-2) from Los Angeles to New York, Post carried a quantity of "cacheted" covers sponsored by Transcontinental & Western Air, Inc on all four flights. When he was killed on August 15, 1935, ending the possibility of any more attempts to complete the AM-2 stratosphere flight, the covers were cancelled in Los Angeles on August 20, 1935, and forwarded to their addressees.

== Final flight and death ==
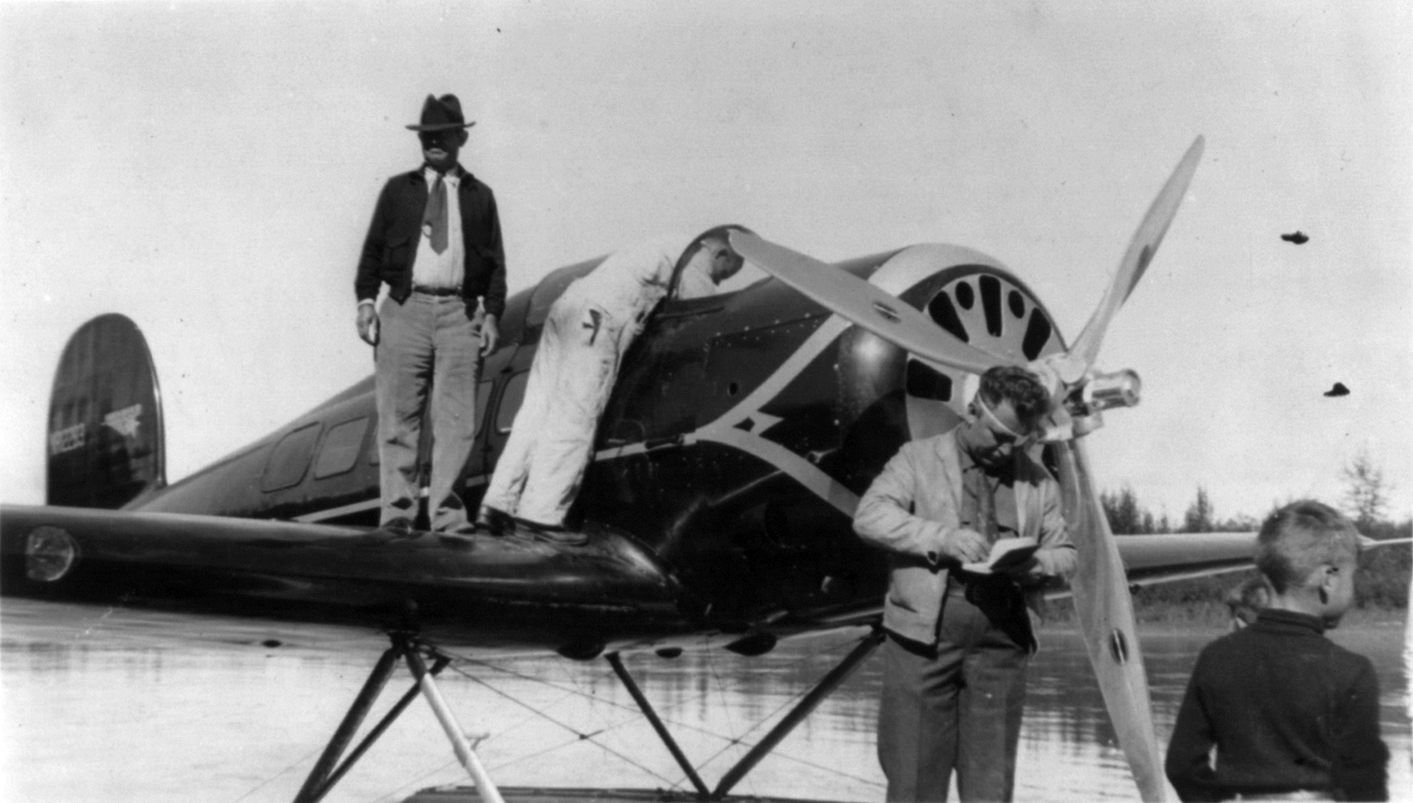
Post with Will Rogers, August 1935

In 1935, Post became interested in surveying a mail-and-passenger air route from the West Coast of the United States to Russia. Short on cash, he built a hybrid using parts salvaged from two different aircraft: the fuselage of an airworthy Lockheed Orion and the wings of a wrecked experimental Lockheed Explorer. The Explorer wing was six feet longer in span than the Orion's original wing, an advantage that extended the range of the hybrid aircraft.

As the Explorer wing did not have retractable landing gear, it lent itself to the fitting of floats for landing in the lakes of Alaska and Siberia. Lockheed refused to make the modifications Post requested, on the grounds that the two designs were incompatible and potentially a dangerous mix, so he made the changes himself.

Post's friend, Will Rogers, visited him often at the airport in Burbank, California, while Pacific Airmotive Ltd. was modifying the aircraft, and asked Post to fly him to Alaska in search of new material for his newspaper column. When the floats Post had ordered were delayed, he used a set designed for a larger aircraft, making the aircraft more nose-heavy than it already was. According to the research of Bryan Sterling, however, the floats were the correct type for the aircraft.

After making a test flight in July, Post and Rogers left Lake Washington, near Seattle, in early August and made several stops in Alaska. While Post piloted the aircraft, Rogers wrote his columns on his typewriter. On August 15, they left Fairbanks for Point Barrow. They were a few miles from Point Barrow when they became uncertain of their position in bad weather and landed in a lagoon to ask for directions. On takeoff, the engine failed at low altitude, and the aircraft, uncontrollably nose-heavy at low speed, plunged into the lagoon, shearing off the right wing, and ended up inverted in the shallow part. Both Post and Rogers died instantly. Post is buried in Memorial Park Cemetery, section 48, Oklahoma City, Oklahoma.

== Honors and tributes ==
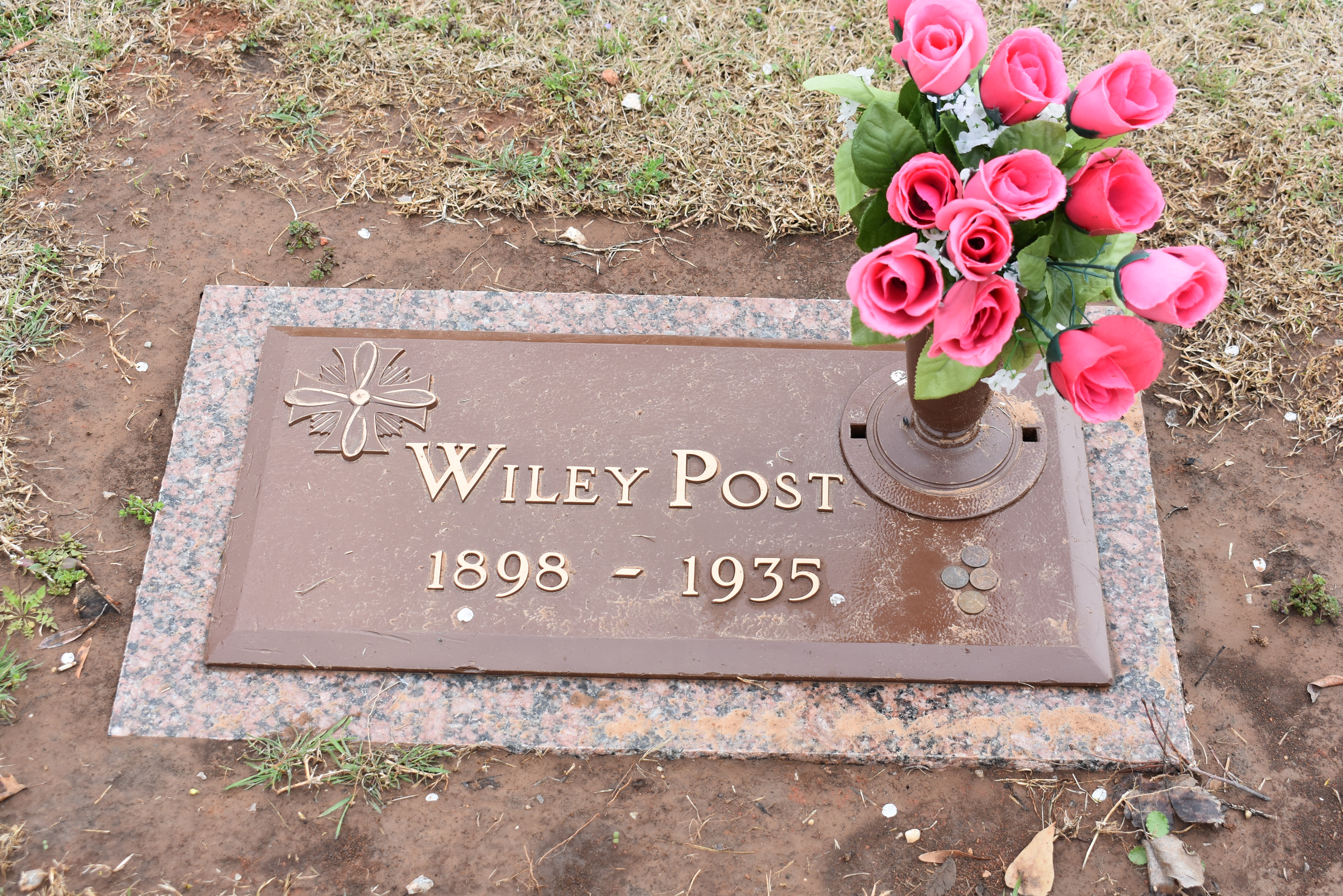
The gravestone of Post

In 1936, the Smithsonian Institution acquired the Winnie Mae from Post's widow for $25,000. Two monuments at the crash site commemorate the death of him and Will Rogers and are listed on the National Register of Historic Places. The nearby Wiley Post–Will Rogers Memorial Airport located in Utqiagvik, Alaska bears their names.

Wiley Post Airport, a large FAA designated reliever airport in Oklahoma City, is named after Post. Oklahoma City's major commercial airport is named after Will Rogers, so that both victims of the crash are honored by airports in Oklahoma City. The Will Rogers – Wiley Post Memorial Seaplane Base is a seaplane base located on Lake Washington, at the north end of the Renton Municipal Airport in Renton, Washington.

The U.S. Army Air Forces, later the United States Air Force, named a street after Post on the former Maywood Army Air Forces Specialized Storage Depot, later Cheli Air Force Station. No longer owned by the federal government, Wiley Post Road remains, connecting Bandini Boulevard and Lindbergh Lane in Bell, California.

Post received the Distinguished Flying Cross (1932), the Gold Medal of Belgium (1934), and the International Harmon Trophy (1934). In 1969, he was enshrined in the National Aviation Hall of Fame. On December 17, 1970, he was inducted into the First Flight Society's First Flight Shrine, located at the Wright Brothers National Memorial.

In 1997, Post was inducted into the International Air & Space Hall of Fame at the San Diego Air & Space Museum.

In 1979, the United States Postal Service honored Post with two airmail stamps.

In 2004, Post was inducted posthumously into the Oklahoma Hall of Fame.

For many years, The Wiley Post Commission, based in Oklahoma City, presented the annual Wiley Post Spirit Award to "an individual in general aviation who best exemplifies the innovative and pioneering spirit of Wiley Post".

== See also ==
- British Air Transport (painting)
- Jerrie Mock, first woman to fly solo around the world (1964, in the Spirit of Columbus)
