= Corinth, Van Zandt County, Texas =

Corinth, Texas
- Ghost town
- Location within Texas Location within the United States
- Coordinates: 32°35′15″N 95°43′17″W
- Country: United States
- State: Texas
- County: Van Zandt
- Elevation: 463 ft (141 m)

Corinth is a ghost town in Van Zandt County, Texas, United States. Corinth was located on Farm to Market Road 1255, 8 miles (13 km) northeast of Canton. From 1848 to 1873, Corinth was a stagecoach stop between Marshall and Dallas. The first school opened in 1849. In 1888, a post office opened in the community under the name Hatton. After the post office closed in 1906, the community was renamed Corinth. Corinth had a school from 1890 to 1940. In 1940, the school was consolidated with the Grand Saline Independent School District. By 1981, all that remained of the community was its church, its cemetery, and some scattered homes.

== Notable person ==
- Wiley Post, aviator who died with Will Rogers in a crash, was born in Corinth.
