= Will Rogers–Wiley Post Memorial Seaplane Base =

Seaplane base in King County, Washington, U.S.

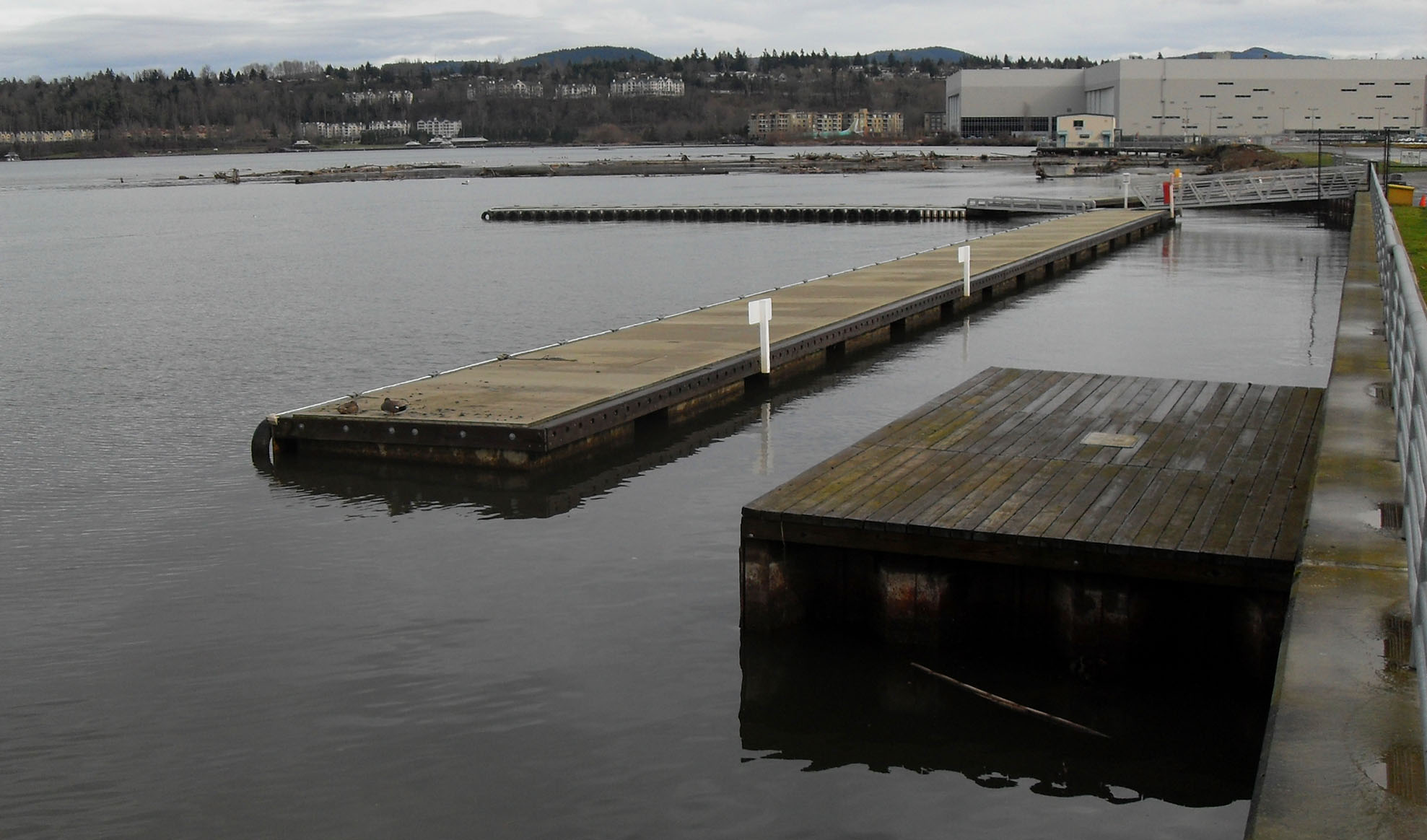
- Seaplane (float plane) Dock and Floats
- IATA: none; ICAO: none; FAA LID: W36

Summary
- Airport type: Public
- Owner/Operator: City of Renton
- Location: Renton, Washington, U.S.
- Elevation AMSL: 14 ft (4.3 m)
- Coordinates: 47°30′1.8288″N 122°13′03.651″W
- Website: Official website
- Interactive map of Will Rogers–Wiley Post Memorial Seaplane Base

Runways
| Direction | Length | | Surface |
| Direction | ft | m | Surface |
|---|---|---|---|
| 12/30 | 5,000 | 1,524 | water |

The Will Rogers–Wiley Post Memorial Seaplane Base (FAA LID: W36) is a seaplane base in Washington state. It is owned and operated by the city of Renton and located on Lake Washington at the northwest corner of Renton Municipal Airport, inside the latter's perimeter fence. The base was named after actor Will Rogers and aviator Wiley Post who took off from the water landing at the beginning of a trip to Alaska, during which they were ultimately killed in an air crash. Wiley Post–Will Rogers Memorial Airport in Utqiagvik, Alaska, is also named for them.

== Gallery ==
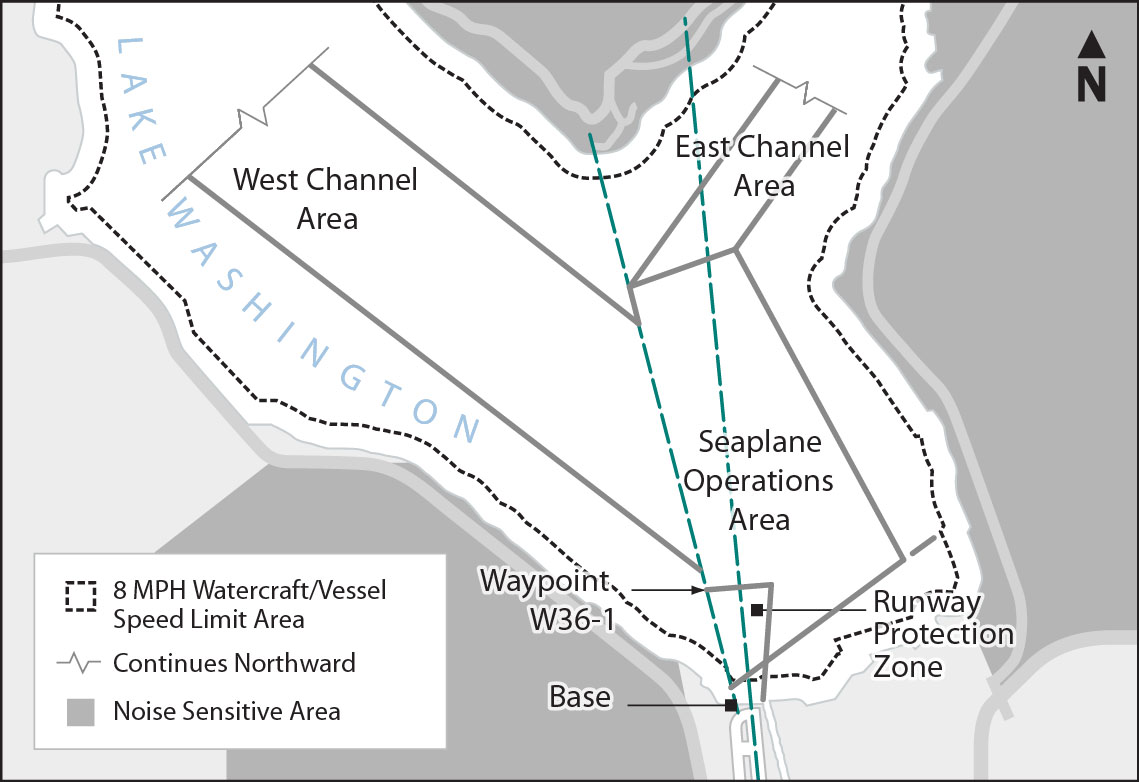
Seaplane (float plane) Operations Area

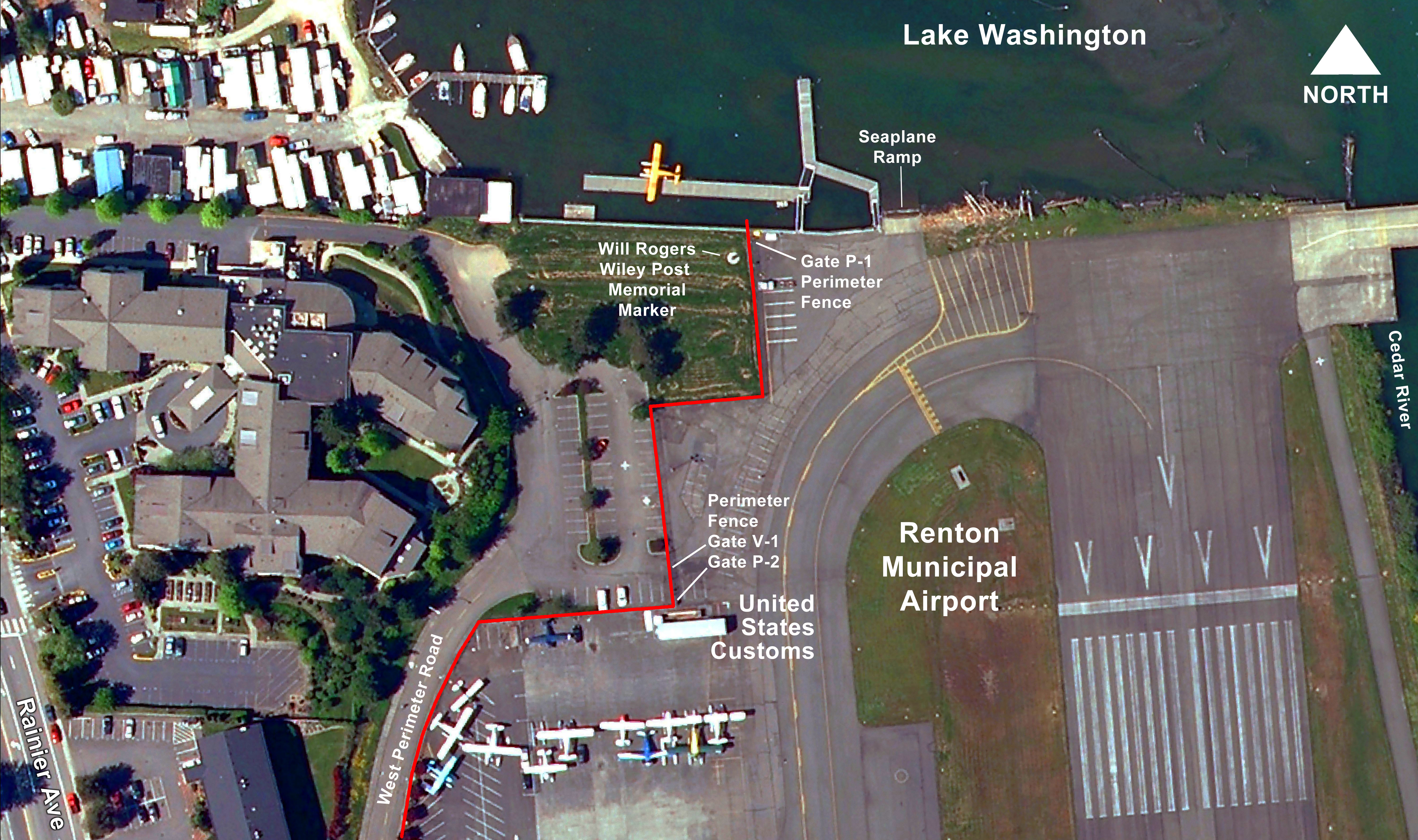
Area overview of the Will Rogers–Wiley Post Memorial Seaplane Base showing the perimeter fence restricting access, nearby streets, the Cedar River, U.S. Customs building, and memorial marker

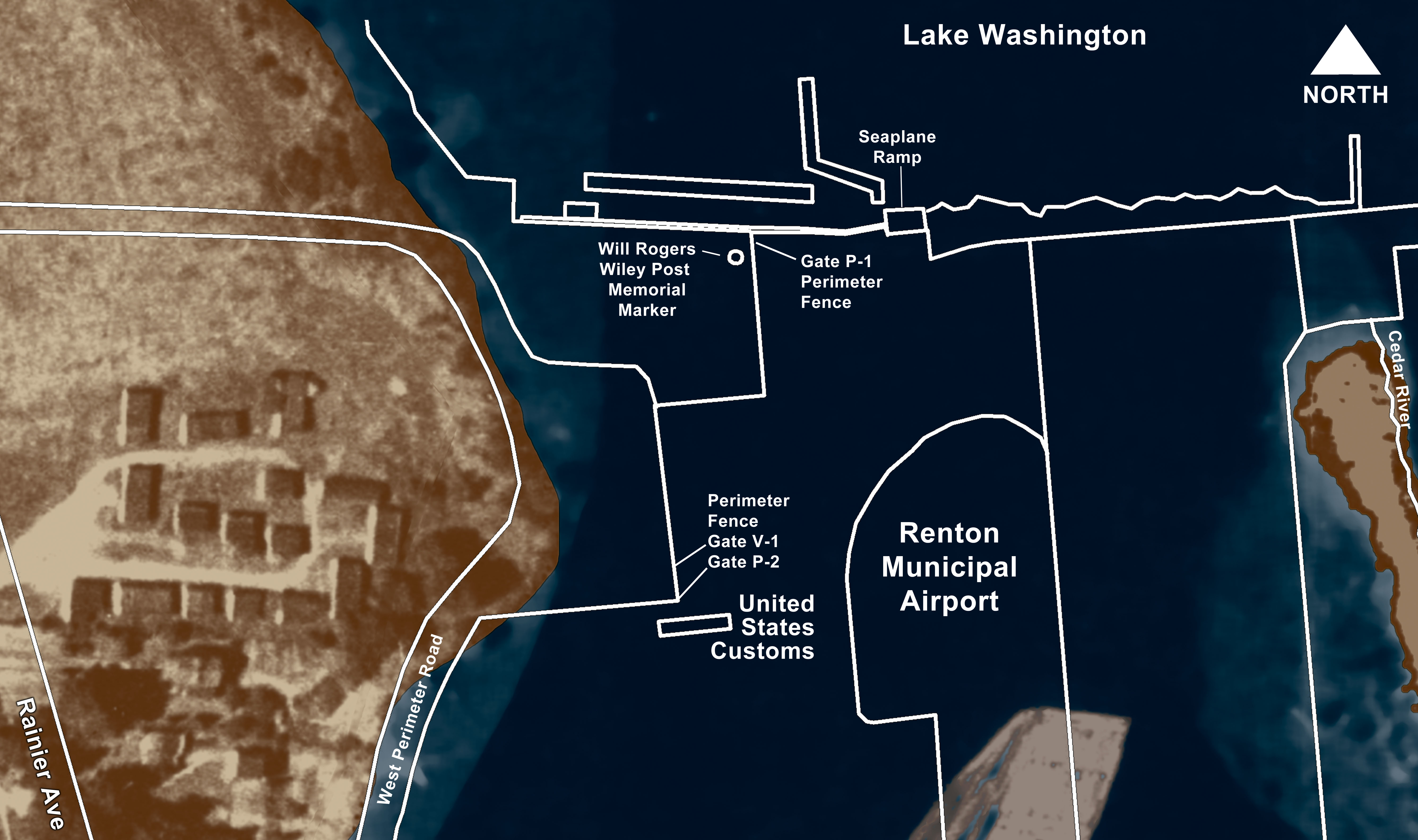
Comparison of present-day features with 1936 (one year after the death of Rogers and Post)

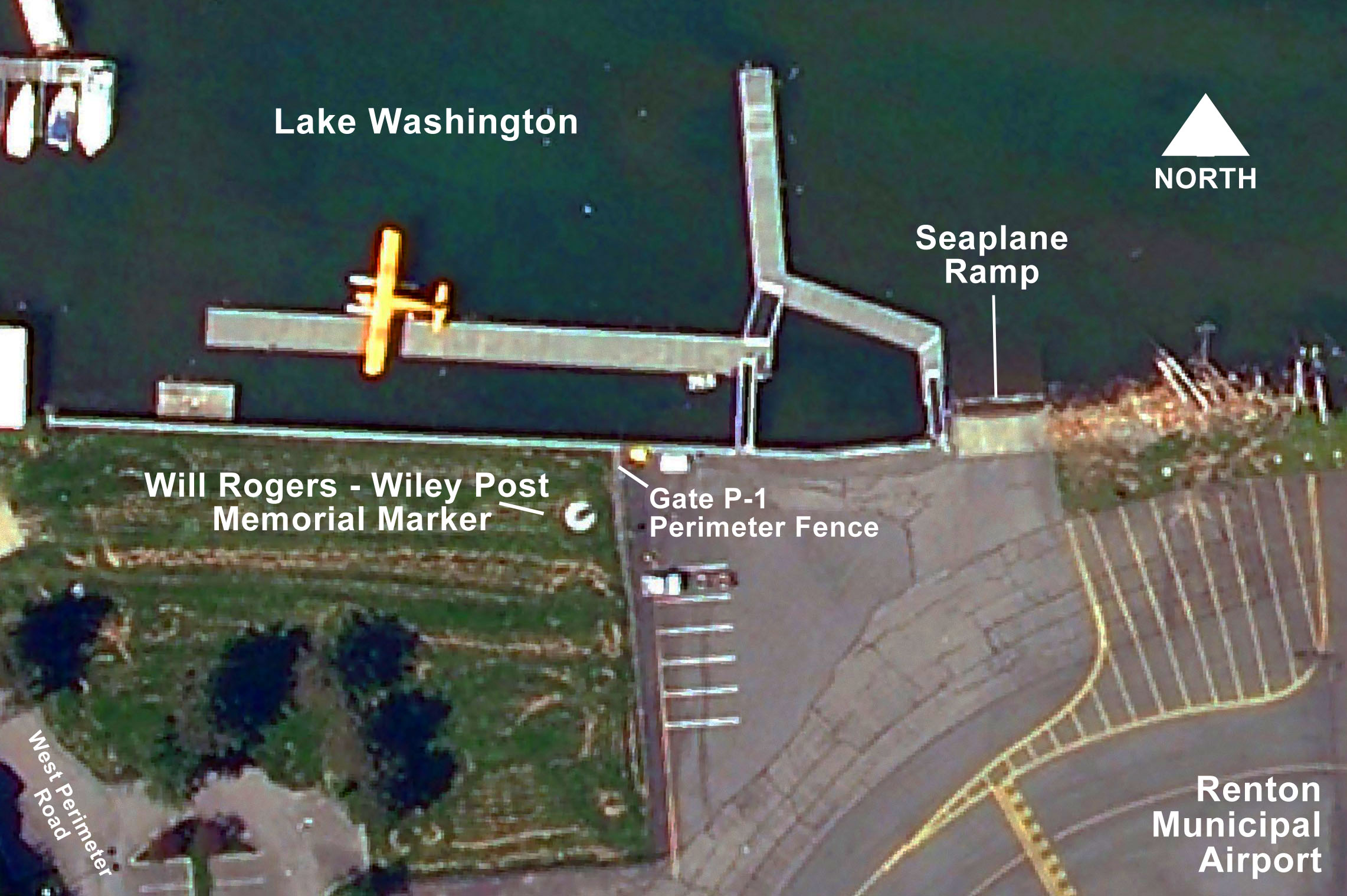
Seaplane (float plane) docks, floats, and ramp. Lake Washington at top (North), West Perimeter Road in lower-left corner. Renton Municipal Airport Perimeter fence bisects the land area at bottom (South), with personnel gate P-1 to the right and the Will Rogers - Wiley Post Memorial marker immediately to the left (East).

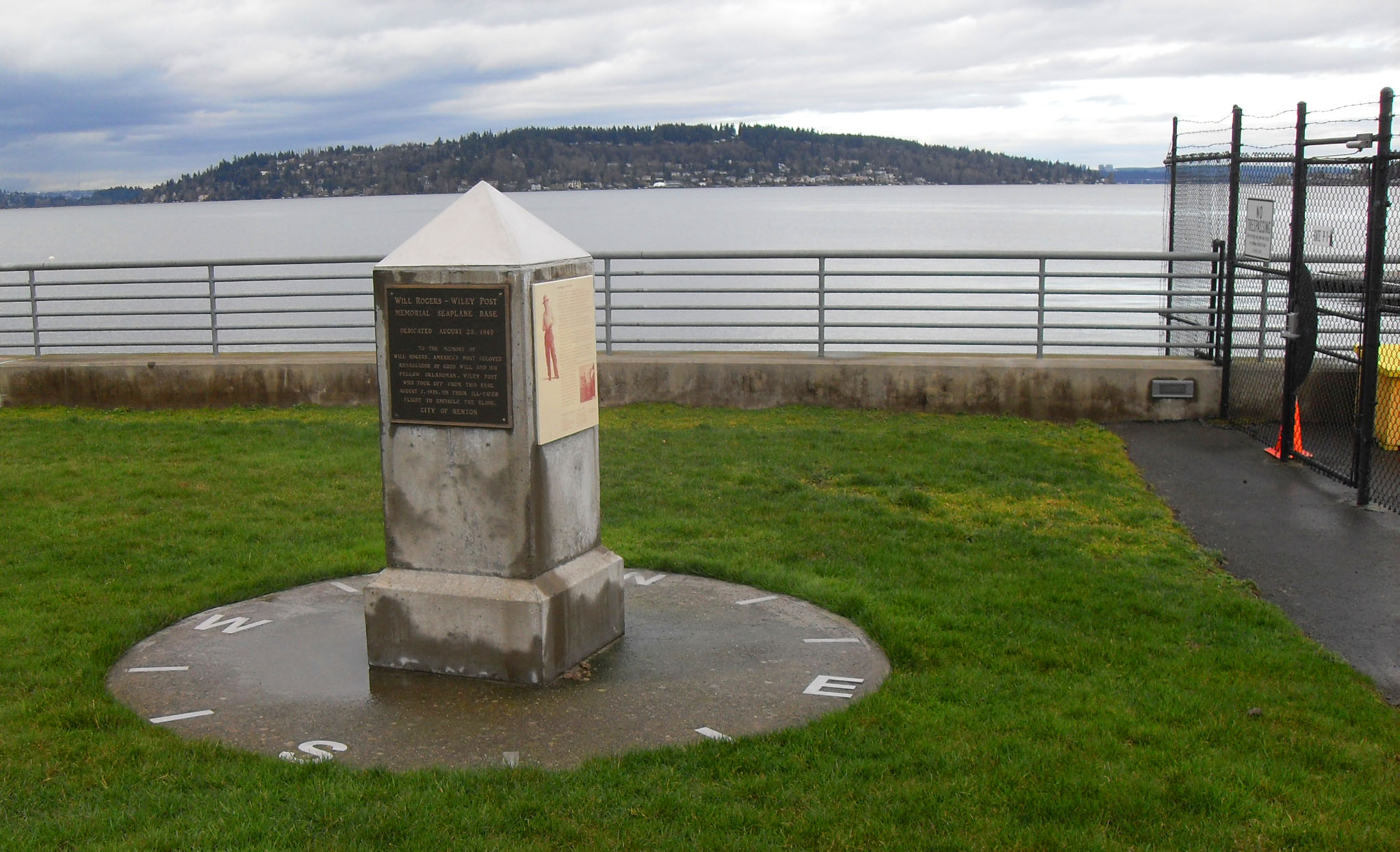
Memorial marker at the Will Rogers – Wiley Post Memorial Seaplane Base

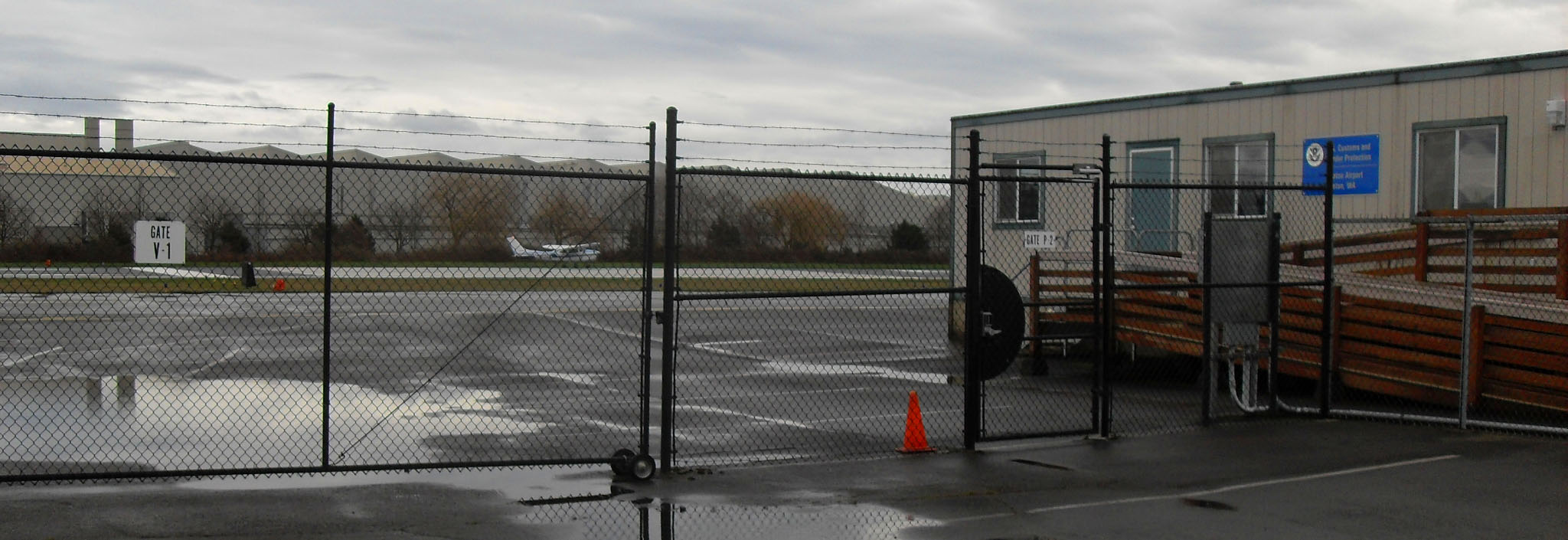
Vehicle Gate V-1 and personnel access Gate P-2 near U.S. Customs Office

== See also ==
- List of airports in Washington
