= William Kempster =

English painter (1914–1977)

- Born: 1914
- Died: 1977 (aged 62–63)
- Notable work: British Air Transport - The Pioneering Days 1919-1934 (1969)

William Kempster (1914–1977) was a British artist, best known for his mural British Air Transport, which was commissioned by British Airports Authority in 1969 for Heathrow Airport, London and then displayed in Terminal One until 2015.

== Early life ==
William Kempster was born in 1914.

== Career ==
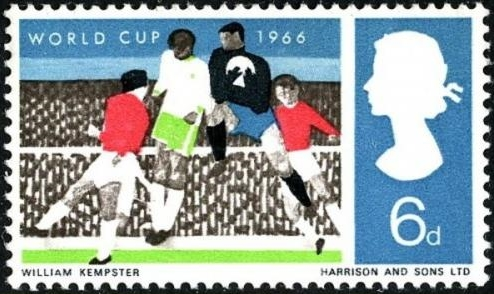
William Kempster's stamp for the 1966 World Cup

With Barry Evans, Kempster painted a mural for the Festival of Britain in 1951.

Also with Evans, he was an illustrator for James Fisher’s The Wonderful World: The Adventure of the Earth We Live On (1954). In addition, he designed a stamp to celebrate the 1966 Football World Cup.

Kempster is best known for his mural British Air Transport, which was commissioned by British Airports Authority in 1969 for Heathrow Airport, London and then displayed in Terminal One until 2015. It was unveiled in 1969 by Queen Elizabeth II and Prince Philip, and it illustrates pioneer British airlines and a number of well-known pilots. In 2018, it was loaned to the Historic Croydon Airport Trust by the Maas Gallery and transferred to be displayed at Croydon Airport.

== Death ==
Kempster died in 1977.
