= Memorial Park Cemetery (Oklahoma City) =

Cemetery in Oklahoma City, OK

Coordinates: 35°36′20″N 97°29′29″W

Memorial Park Cemetery is a cemetery in Oklahoma City, Oklahoma. Located at 13400 North Kelley Avenue, the 175 acre (71 ha) cemetery includes the grave of Wiley Post.
