= Renton Municipal Airport =

Airport in King County, Washington State

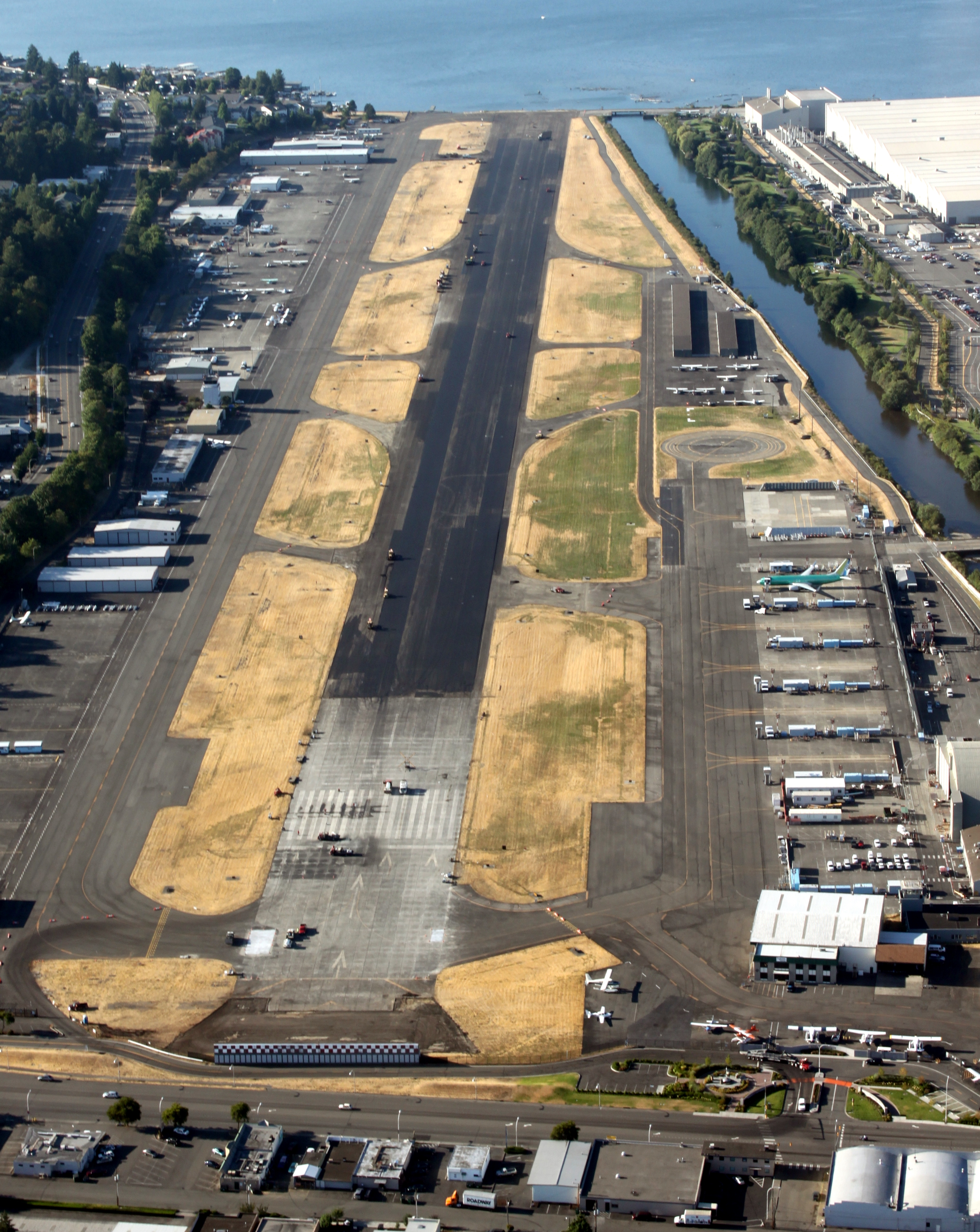
- Airport during a runway resurfacing project, August 2009
- IATA: RNT; ICAO: KRNT; FAA LID: RNT

Summary
- Airport type: Public
- Owner: City of Renton
- Serves: Renton, Washington
- Elevation AMSL: 32 ft / 10 m
- Coordinates: 47°29′35″N 122°12′57″W
- Website: Official website

Maps
- FAA airport diagram
- Location of airport in Washington RNT (the United States)

Runways
Direction	Length		Surface
Direction	ft	m	Surface
16/34	5,382	1,640	Asphalt/Concrete

Statistics
- Aircraft operations (2017): 122,908
- Based aircraft (2017): 250
- Source: Federal Aviation Administration

Renton Municipal Airport (IATA: RNT, ICAO: KRNT, FAA LID: RNT) is a public use airport located in Renton, a city in King County, Washington, United States. The airport was renamed Clayton Scott Field in 2005 to celebrate the 100th birthday of Clayton Scott. The airport's northern boundary is Lake Washington and the Will Rogers–Wiley Post Memorial Seaplane Base. Renton Airport has a floating dock and a launching ramp for conversion from wheeled landings to water takeoffs and landings.

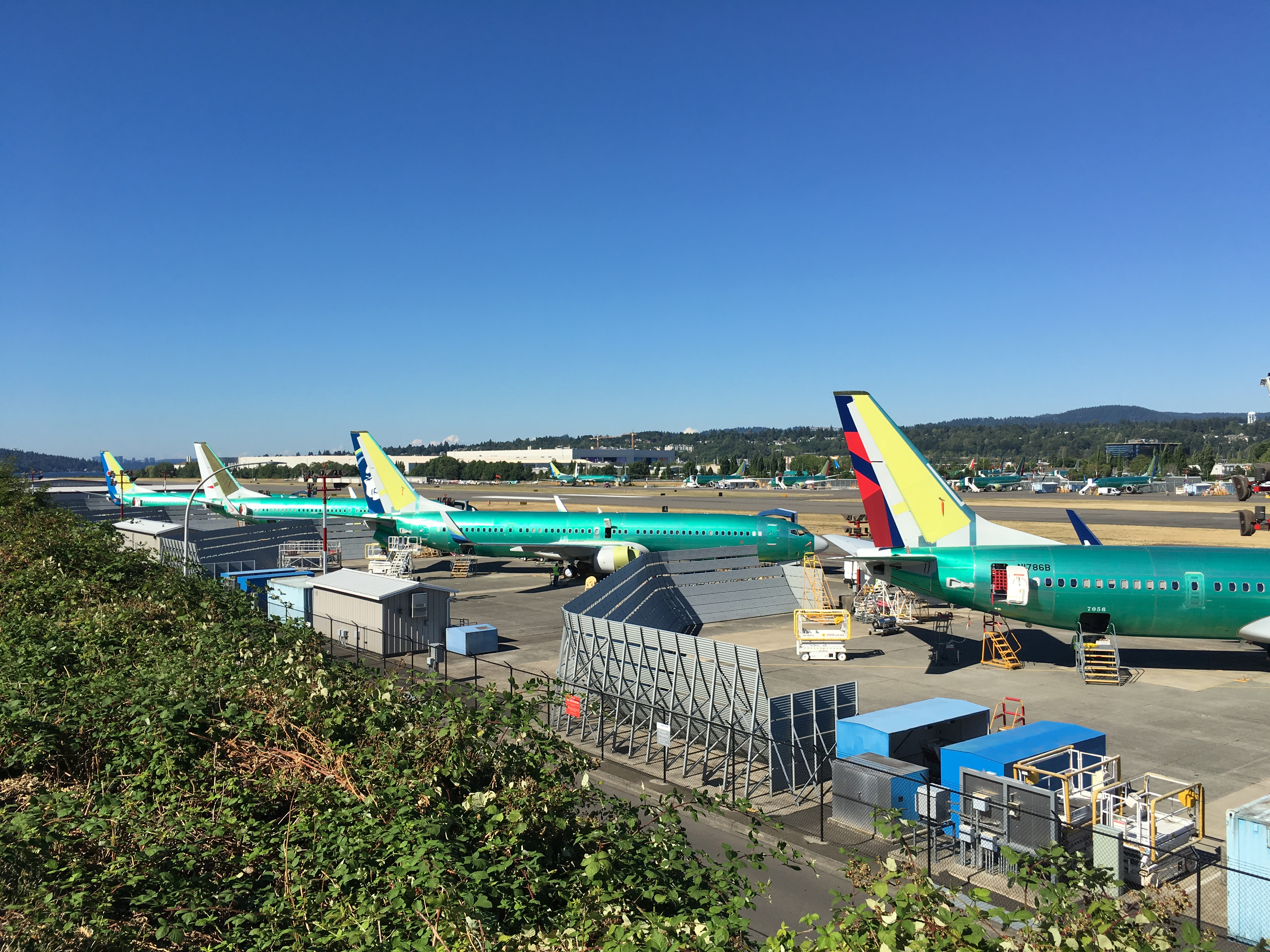
View of brand new 737s being outfitted on the west side of Renton.

The airport is owned by the City of Renton and is a general aviation airport which serves Renton and other nearby communities. It provides regional aviation services for air charter, air taxi, corporate, business and recreational flyers. It is included in the Federal Aviation Administration (FAA) National Plan of Integrated Airport Systems for 2017–2021, in which it is categorized as a regional reliever facility.

The airport is located approximately 12 miles southeast of downtown Seattle near the south end of Lake Washington. US Customs service is available for both floatplane and wheeled aircraft arriving by water or by land.

Renton Airport is adjacent to the Boeing Renton Factory that manufactures 737s and formerly 757s, and is the initial point of departure for airplanes produced in that facility.

== Facilities and aircraft ==
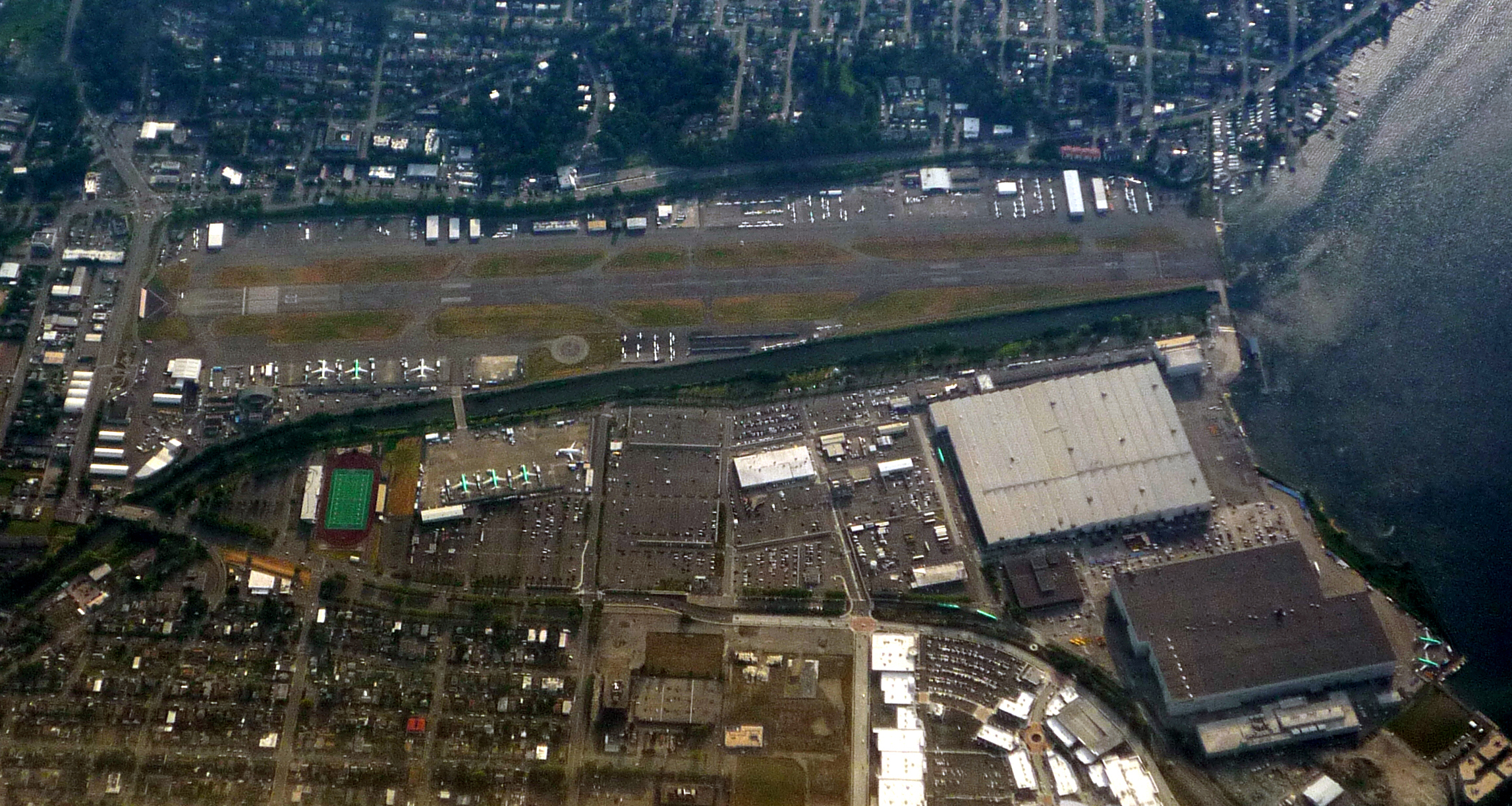
Aerial view showing airport and adjacent Boeing Renton Factory (large structures)

Renton Municipal Airport covers an area of 170 acres (69 ha) at an elevation of 32 feet (9.8 m) above mean sea level. It has one runway designated 16/34 with an asphalt and concrete surface measuring 5,382 by 200 feet (1,640 m × 61 m). The runway was resurfaced and realigned in August 2009; prior to this time, it was designated 15/33.

In 2016, the airport had 122,908 aircraft operations, an average of 337 per day: 98% general aviation, 1% air taxi, <1% scheduled commercial, and <1% military. In July 2017, there were 337 aircraft based at this airport: 243 single-engine, 13 multi-engine, 4 jet, and 8 helicopter.

== See also ==
- List of airports in Washington (state)
