= Rogers–Post Site =

Archaeological site in Alaska, United States

- U.S. National Register of Historic Places
- Alaska Heritage Resources Survey
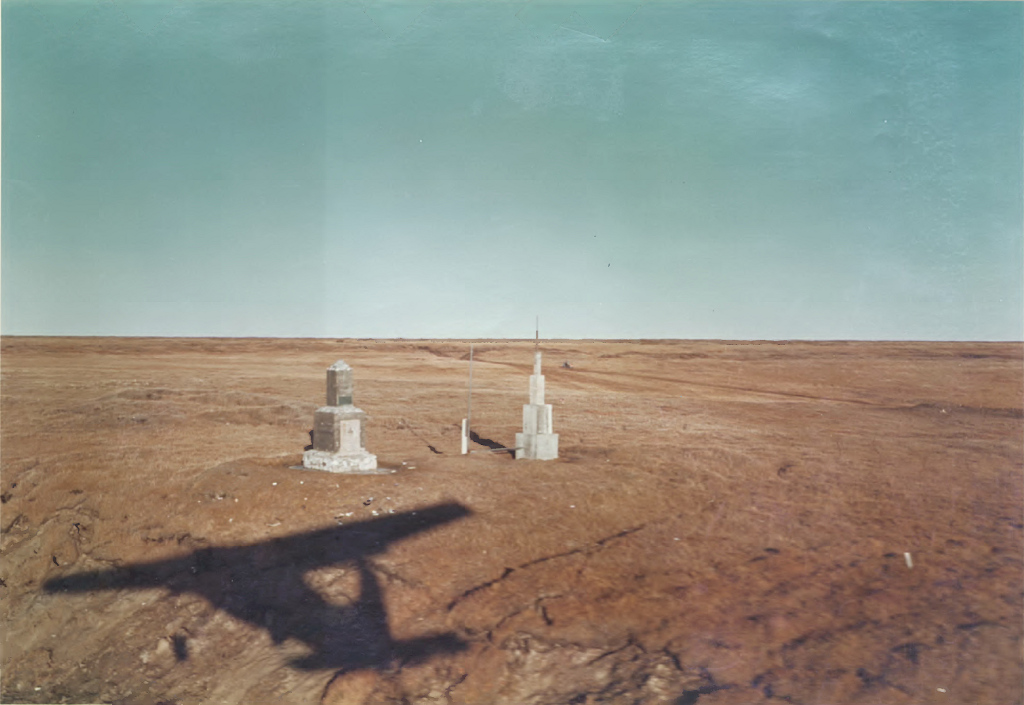

- Location within Alaska
- Location: Near Walakpa River mouth, about 11 miles (18 km) southwest of Utqiaġvik
- Nearest city: Utqiaġvik, Alaska
- Coordinates: 71°09′15″N 157°03′50″W
- Area: 0.5 acres (0.20 ha)
- Built: 1935
- Architect: Will Rogers Memorial; Jesse Stubbs
- NRHP reference No.: 80004564
- AHRS No.: BAR-005

Significant dates
- Added to NRHP: April 22, 1980
- Designated AHRS: December 23, 1971

The Rogers–Post Site, located on the North Slope of the U.S. state of Alaska, is the location of a plane crash that killed humorist Will Rogers and aviator Wiley Post on August 15, 1935, during an aerial tour of Alaska. It is about 11 miles (18 km) southwest of Utqiaġvik, on the north side of Walakpa Bay near the mouth of the Walakpa River. The flight was described by the Associated Press as a prelude to a planned Trans-Siberian flight to Moscow. The pair were flying from Fairbanks to Barrow (modern-day Utqiaġvik) when they encountered fog and low visibility. Locating a hole in the fog at Walakpa Bay, they landed. They spent some time with a small party of Alaska Natives and received directions for the short distance remaining to Barrow. They were barely airborne, around 50 feet (15 m), when the motor failed. The aircraft plummeted into the lagoon and overturned. It was the first fatal air accident near the city of Utqiaġvik.

The first monument at the site was dedicated three years after the crash and financed through nationwide public subscription. It was designed in Oklahoma, home of both Rogers and Post, and built from poured concrete. The design was essentially two cubes, the smaller atop the larger, with a pink granite memorial marker quarried near the Rogers family home in Claremore, Oklahoma. The elaborate dedication ceremonies involved a four-way CBS radio broadcast from Barrow, the United States Capitol, the Oklahoma State Capitol, and the Texas State Capitol.

The second monument, built 15 years later, is a concrete obelisk consisting of four diminishing rectangular blocks, and is more slender and almost 10 feet (3 m) taller than the first monument. It was built by then 72-year-old Jesse Stubbs (November 30, 1879 – March 14, 1960), who claimed to be a childhood friend of Rogers and arrived in Anchorage in summer 1953 intending to walk from there to Barrow, only getting as far as Fairbanks where he, and his dog Quacco, caught a plane flight for the remainder of the journey. The Stubbs monument memorializes not only Rogers and Post, but also the Alaskan veterans of World War II. Both monuments overlooked the lagoon crash site.

Photos from the summer of 2017 show only the original monument still standing. The Stubbs monument was relocated to Barrow in 2016 after its location was threatened by coastal erosion. Another memorial had been previously dedicated in Barrow on August 15, 1982.

The site was listed on the National Register of Historic Places in 1980.

== See also ==
- National Register of Historic Places listings in North Slope Borough, Alaska
