= Bend station =

Railway station in British Columbia, Canada

Bend

General information
- Location: Bend, British Columbia; Canada
- Coordinates: 53°46′N 121°04′W
- Platforms: 1

Construction
- Structure type: Sign post

History
- Former names: Grand Trunk Pacific Railway

Services
Preceding station	Via Rail	Following station
Penny toward Prince Rupert	Jasper–Prince Rupert	Dome Creek toward Jasper
Location

Bend station is on the Canadian National Railway mainline in Bend, British Columbia. Via Rail's Jasper – Prince Rupert train calls at the station as a flag stop.

The stop is across the Fraser River from the village of Dome Creek which is accessible by Gravel Road from Yellowhead Highway 16.

== History ==
Bend, like Guilford to its northwest, and Kidd to its southeast, was an original train station (1914) on the Grand Trunk Pacific Railway (the Canadian National Railway after nationalization). Bend lies at Mile 57.7, Fraser Subdivision (about Mile 147 during the line's construction).

Commencing the 1928 special Dominion Day train to Prince George from Bend suggests the community's significance at the time. At the rail bridge in 1931, a train struck and killed Elfrida Strand, who was searching for stray horses with her husband. In 1948, another rail accident occurred when two forestry speeders carrying 17 men to a forest fire at Loos collided near Bend, resulting in hospitalizations. In 1946, a spirited moose paced a westbound train. Tripping on the encrusted snow at Mile 58, it fell behind the tender, derailing four freight cars.

Built in 1914, the standard-design Plan 100-152 (Bohi's Type E) station building could not have survived the 1942 fire, or been the structure dismantled in 1962. The fate of an unidentified freight and passenger shelter is unclear.

Service	1914–c.1915	c.1916–c.1921	c.1921–1931	1932–1942	1943–c.1948	c.1949–1968	1968–1977	1977–present
Passenger	Regular stop	Flag stop	Flag stop		Flag stop	Flag stop		Flag stop
Way freight	Flag stop probably	Flag stop probably	Regular stop	Regular stop	Regular stop	Flag stop	Flag stop	

Siding	Mile No.	1922	1933	1943	1960	1965–72	1977	1990–92
(Capacity Length)		Cars	Cars	Cars	Cars	Cars	Feet	Feet
Bend	57.7	67	65	57	52	128	5,830	6,090

Other Tracks	Mile No.	1933	1943	1960	1965–68
(Capacity Length)		Cars	Cars	Cars	Cars
Bend Lumber Co.	57.2	12	12		
Bend	57.7			3	16
P.J. Strand	59.9	7			
