= Smithers station =

Railway station in Smithers, Canada

Smithers
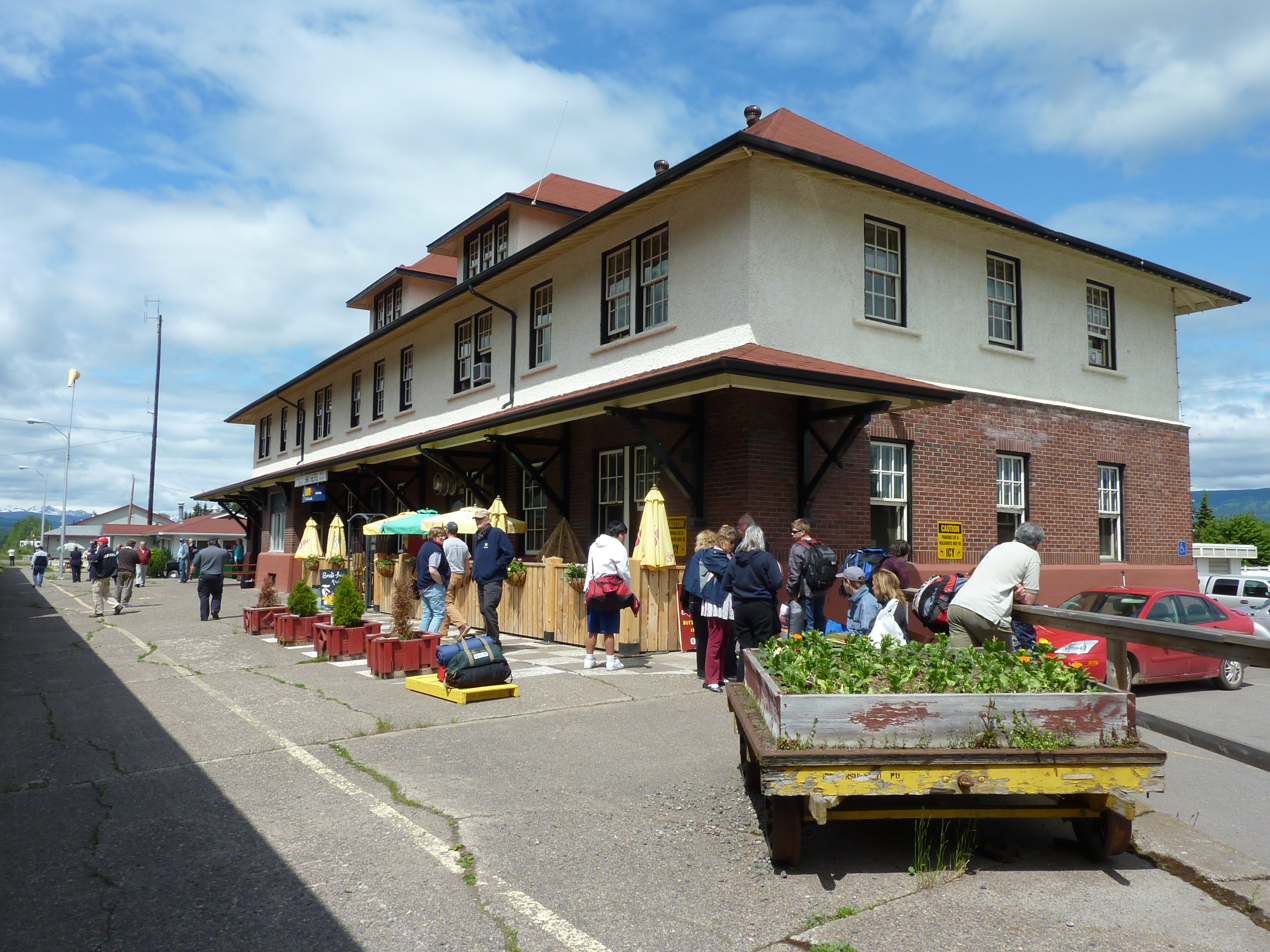

General information
- Location: 3815 North Railway Street; Smithers, British Columbia; Canada
- Coordinates: 54.7778°N 127.1760°W
- Line: Jasper–Prince Rupert train
- Platforms: 1

Construction
- Structure type: Shelter
- Platform levels: 1
- Parking: available
- Accessible: yes

Services
Preceding station	Via Rail	Following station
Terrace toward Prince Rupert	Jasper–Prince Rupert Major stops	Prince George toward Jasper
Former services
Preceding station	Canadian National Railway	Following station
Lake Kathlyn toward Prince Rupert	Prince Rupert – Jasper	Tatlow toward Jasper
Location
- Location within British Columbia Location within Canada

Smithers station is a railway station in Smithers, British Columbia. It is on the Canadian National Railway mainline and serves Via Rail's Jasper–Prince Rupert train. The station was designated a national heritage railway station in 1990.

== See also ==
- List of designated heritage railway stations of Canada
