= Bend, British Columbia =

- Railway Point
- Location of Bend in British Columbia
- Coordinates: 53°46′00″N 121°04′00″W
- Country: Canada
- Province: British Columbia
- Land District: Cariboo
- Regional District: Fraser-Fort George
- Geographic Region: Robson Valley
- Elevation: 636 m (2,087 ft)
- Area codes: 250, 778, 236, & 672

Bend, the remnants of a community 2.1 miles (3.4 km) northwest of Dome Creek in central British Columbia, comprises several scattered rural properties stretching along the Fraser River on the northwest side of the railway bridge. The area was named after the 90-degree curve on the railway track, 1 mile (1.6 km) northwest of the railway bridge.

== Transportation ==
A trackside signpost marks Bend station, the flag stop for Via Rail's Jasper – Prince Rupert train. The immediate Via Rail stops are Penny to the northwest and Dome Creek station to the southeast. The stop is across the Fraser River from the village of Dome Creek which is accessible by Gravel Road from the Yellowhead Highway.

== History ==
=== Railway ===
Bend, like Guilford to its northwest, and Kidd to its southeast, was an original train station (1914) on the Grand Trunk Pacific Railway (the Canadian National Railway after nationalization). Bend lies at Mile 57.7, Fraser Subdivision (about Mile 147 during the line's construction).

Commencing the 1928 special Dominion Day train to Prince George from Bend suggests the community's significance at the time. At the rail bridge in 1931, a train struck and killed Elfrida Strand, who was searching for stray horses with her husband. In 1948, another rail accident occurred when two forestry speeders carrying 17 men to a forest fire at Loos collided near Bend, resulting in hospitalizations. In 1946, a spirited moose paced a westbound train. Tripping on the encrusted snow at Mile 58, it fell behind the tender, derailing four freight cars.

Built in 1914, the standard-design Plan 100-152 (Bohi's Type E) station building could not have survived the 1942 fire, or been the structure dismantled in 1962. The fate of an unidentified freight and passenger shelter is unclear.

Service	1914–c.1915	c.1916–c.1921	c.1921–1931	1932–1942	1943–c.1948	c.1949–1968	1968–1977	1977–present
Passenger	Regular stop	Flag stop	Flag stop		Flag stop	Flag stop		Flag stop
Way freight	Flag stop probably	Flag stop probably	Regular stop	Regular stop	Regular stop	Flag stop	Flag stop	

Siding	Mile No.	1922	1933	1943	1960	1965–72	1977	1990–92
(Capacity Length)		Cars	Cars	Cars	Cars	Cars	Feet	Feet
Bend	57.7	67	65	57	52	128	5,830	6,090

Other Tracks	Mile No.	1933	1943	1960	1965–68
(Capacity Length)		Cars	Cars	Cars	Cars
Bend Lumber Co.	57.2	12	12		
Bend	57.7			3	16
P.J. Strand	59.9	7			

=== Forestry ===
The narrow strip of accessible spruce forest bordering the railway that stretched some 100 miles (160 km) east of Prince George was known as the East Line.

The York Lumber Co., Baldry Bros. proprietors, commenced operations in the 1923/24 winter. Wallace (Wally) N. Jaeck (1876–1954), formerly at Longworth, acquired the mill at a 1925 receivership auction. In partnership with son C. Earl (1904–52), later at Penny, he opened an enlarged mill in August 1928, which operated as the Bend Lumber Co. It is unclear whether P.J. Strand ran a small sawmill at Mile 59.9 or only logged in the vicinity.

In 1934, John F. McMillan purchased a controlling interest in Bend Lumber. At this time, Sinclair Spruce Mills were logging for the company. A Board of Trade delegation included this 45,000-foot-daily capacity mill on their 1937 tour. Rory (Roy) R.M. McGillivray (1903–94), later at Penny, and family arrived that year. C. Earl Jaeck, a cousin of Roy’s wife Elizabeth (1906–91), was the president of the mill and Roy became the manager.

Donald Jaeck (c.1926–1938), Earl's son, died of appendicitis. The following year, Leonard H. Jaeck (1880–1958), formerly at Longworth, and Earl's uncle, fractured his leg at work, and Patrick Murdock (1883–1939), the mill accountant, collapsed at his desk and died. Lillian (1903–69), Earl's wife, daughter of lumber pioneer Eugene Bashaw, headed the local Red Cross fundraising effort during World War II.

In 1942, when a 60 mph (97 km/h) wind swept through the area, toppled trees fell on telephone wires, cutting off communication with the outside. The gale dispersed embers from the mill burner into the mill building and across the settlement, razing the sawmill, finished lumber, the immediate village, and a number of railway freight cars on the siding. Only the cookhouse, a small dwelling and some shacks remained. It also created spot fires in Dome Creek across the Fraser. Most of the men were away fighting forest fires. Relief supplies for the 200 victims, who had lost everything, were dispatched from McBride, garnering praise for the Red Cross and Salvation Army. The CNR had immediately provided a special train to collect residents and their rescued possessions. Over the following years, salvageable material was reclaimed from the site. The mill not rebuilt, only the farming community and those employed in Dome Creek remained.

=== Hunting & farming ===
Trapper Martin (Deafy) Dayton (1886–1940) relocated from Kidd in the late 1930s.

Oscar Benson (1889–1950) travelled by scow from Tête Jaune to Fort George around 1913, and proceeded to take up a preemption at Bend, where he built a log cabin. Marrying Siri Magnuson (1893–1978) in 1919, they farmed their quarter section near the railway bridge. The 1936 flood filled their basement and submerged the low-lying parts of their farm bordering the river. Household water was collected by the bucket from the river. Their children raised in Bend were Carrie S. (1923–2012) and Carl A. (1928–2015). Carrie relocated to Penny, where in 1946 she married Arne Mellows of Penny. Breaking his leg in an industrial accident at the Dome Creek sawmill, Carl spent a year at St. Paul's Hospital (Vancouver), before returning. In 1948, he also moved to Penny and became co-owner of the store with his brother-in-law. Selling his interest, Carl and his parents acquired the Aleza Lake store in late 1949, and moved there in early 1950.

James B. (1884–1955) (grave marker shows 1883) & Adeline (1891–1979) Hooker arrived in 1913. He divided the first five years in working for the Great Northern Railway in Minot, North Dakota, and establishing the farm at Bend.

James became a well-known hunter, trapper and guide, catering to American parties. In 1940, he accompanied a constable in a futile search of 130 miles (210 km) of the Fraser River bars and banks for a missing logger, who was presumed drowned. When the Rotary barrel floated the 145 miles (233 km) from Dome Creek/Bend to Prince George in 1943, 1944 and 1945, James was the official monitor for the first half of the journey. On his death, Adeline remained until moving to Prince George.

Lawrence (Larry) J. married Thelma Dorene Hutchinson (c.1917–?) in 1934. They settled in Sinclair Mills, where he worked as a guide, trapper and mill employee. One child did not survive infancy. In 1942, the family relocated to Los Angeles. Ruth married Wentworth Stephen Ganton (1907–69) and moved extensively with their children. They divorced and she relocated to Los Angeles in 1955. Edward, who was the first baby born in the area, teamed up with his father as a guide and outfitter. While breaking up a logjam at Penny, the logger slipped and drowned. Only 21, his body was found over seven months later.

Glen at 12, misreported as Allen, saved a companion from drowning in the river. He enlisted 1945–46, was a principal of Hooker Bros Sawmill during the 1950s to early 1960s, and remained in the Dome Creek area. His marriage to Mary Myttennor produced two sons and a daughter, and the one to Myra VanDeReit likewise. Glen and Myra relocated to McBride in 2008. From around 1990, they divided their time with their Arizona property. Marion worked in Vancouver, returned and married Jim Chambers (1924–?) of Penny in 1946. They spent their young married life raising their children in the Dome Creek area, before relocating. Elizabeth (Bette) Rose, enlisting in the CWAC in 1942, relocated to the coast. Married to Lyell Alexander Winters, they raised a family. After his death in 1977, she remarried.

Kenneth enlisted 1944–46. After his first marriage failed, he married Doris Winona Reaugh (1923–93). Their son Kenneth (1959–93) died of pneumonia. Kenneth Sr. partnered in the Hooker Bros Sawmill in the 1950s to early 1960s, and remained in the Dome Creek area. A hunting guide, he built a lodge and was critical of clear-cuts. In the 1980s, he was fined for baiting bears and his guide licence was suspended for three years. Clifford relocated to Vancouver and died at 17 in an industrial accident. Clarence (Catsy) served in the Korean War, married Jean Louise Turner (1933–2001), and had a family. Settling in the Dome Creek area, he was a logging contractor. While Jean cooked at the Hooker Bros. camp, he hauled logs for Nance Lumber of Dome Creek. The family relocated to Prince George.

=== Community ===
Built near the train station, the school opened in 1925, with Miss Alfreda Larsen as the inaugural teacher. After the building burned down in the 1942 fire, class was held in an outlying house that had survived the blaze. Becoming part of the former McBride School District in 1945, it closed the following year, having 11 students in Grades 1–8. Thereafter, students attended the Dome Creek School. A scheduled reopening for 1948 did not transpire, because no suitable teacher was available, and plans commenced to make the consolidation of the schools permanent. School District 57 disposed of the surplus school site at Bend in 1985. Schoolchildren would cross the Fraser on the ice in winter and by boat in summer. During spring, the hazardous railway bridge provided the only crossing point.

Dorothy Sylvia Jaeck (1892–1946), wife of Leonard H. Jaeck, opened a general store in 1927, which Fred Hanson (c.1888–1931) appears to have acquired the next year.

Otto Ellefson (possibly 1879–1957) opened a store in 1929, and also operated a boarding house. Fred was the inaugural postmaster 1930–31, with Hans Bernhardt Hanson assuming the position 1931–42 on his death. Commonly, the postmaster in such towns was also a storeowner. The post-office closed 5 months after his resignation.

Opened in 1941, the community hall hosted various functions. In his role as rector of All Saints Anglican, McBride, Rev. J.J. Cowan sometimes held evening services in the Bend schoolhouse, a venue also used for dances during the 1940s. The population dropped to about 20 after the fire.

=== Crime, calamity & safety measures ===
After a 1924 altercation between Joseph (Joe) Studal (c.1890–1925) and William Reade of Dome Creek, Studal was released on bail. After the serious assault charges were dismissed, Reade beat up Studal and received a 30-day sentence. Before year end Studal died at Richie.

A 1938 after-dance party led to a physical altercation and court appearance.

In 1960, a black bear mauled Heller Hrechka (Hreczka alternate spelling) (1931–79), a CNR section hand (track maintenance), while he walked along the railway right-of-way, just west of the bridge. Barely recognizable, he was hospitalized with gashes to the head, shoulders and chest.

=== Roads ===
No permanent outside road access has existed. However, individuals have illegally driven vehicles across the CNR rail bridge. To save on transportation costs, Doug Abernethy of Guilford Lumber once drove a small Cat dozer over the bridge, but was able to talk his way out of being charged.

=== Electricity, broadcast transmissions & communications devices ===
The respective Dome Creek section covers these networks.
