= Dunster station (British Columbia) =

Railway station in British Columbia, Canada

Dunster
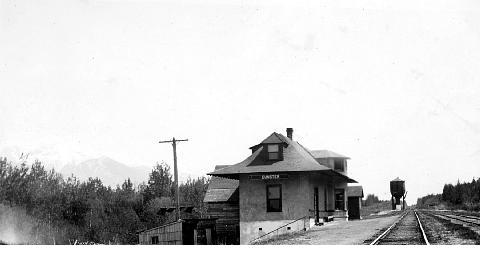
- Station in the 1920s

General information
- Location: Dunster, BC; Canada
- Coordinates: 53°07′27″N 119°50′16″W
- Platforms: 1

Construction
- Structure type: Sign post

History
- Opened: 1913
- Former names: Grand Trunk Pacific Railway

Services
Preceding station	Via Rail	Following station
McBride toward Prince Rupert	Jasper–Prince Rupert	Harvey toward Jasper

Former services
Preceding station	Canadian National Railway	Following station
Raush Valley toward Prince Rupert	Prince Rupert – Jasper	Croydon toward Jasper
Location
- Location within British Columbia Location within Canada

Dunster station is on the Canadian National Railway mainline in Dunster, British Columbia. The station is served by Via Rail's Jasper–Prince Rupert train as a flag stop.

The original railway station was built by the Grand Trunk Pacific Railway and opened in 1913. The station and town was named by a railway inspector after his home-town of Dunster in England.
