= Whistler station =

Railway station in British Columbia, Canada

Whistler
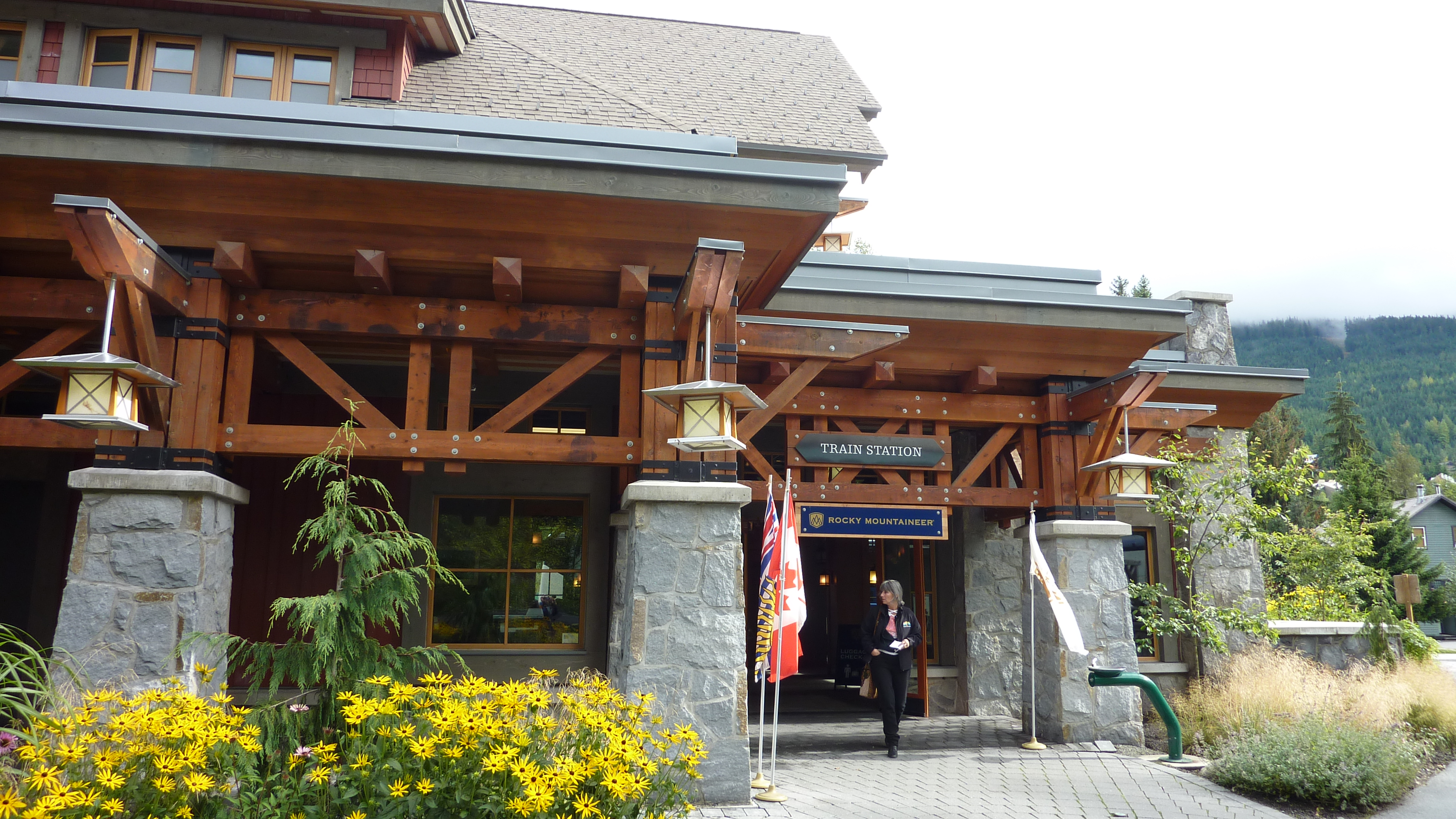

General information
- Location: Lake Placid Road, Whistler, BC; Canada
- Coordinates: 50°05′45″N 122°59′50″W

History
- Opened: 2007

Former services
| Preceding station | Rocky Mountaineer | Following station |
|---|---|---|
| North Vancouver Terminus | Coastal Passage | Quesnel towards Jasper |
| North Vancouver Terminus | Whistler Sea to Sky Climb | Terminus |
| North Vancouver Terminus | Rainforest to Gold Rush | Quesnel towards Jasper |
At former BC Rail station (pre-2002)
| Preceding station | BC Rail | Following station |
| Water Tank toward North Vancouver | Cariboo Prospector | Canadian Hostel toward Lillooet or Prince George |
Location
- Location within British Columbia Location within Canada

Whistler station is a railway station located in Whistler, British Columbia, Canada, along the BC Rail line. Rocky Mountaineer formerly used this station; the Whistler Sea to Sky Climb was discontinued in 2016, and the Rainforest to Gold Rush was discontinued in 2026.

The PGE line was established in 1912, and rail service to the Whistler area has been provided since the early days of operation until BC Rail ended all passenger service in 2002. The current station building was built for Whistler Rail Tours (former operators of the Whistler Sea to Sky Climb) in 2007.

During the 2010 Winter Olympics, a special Rocky Mountaineer train sponsored by the government of the neighbouring province of Alberta served as public transit between Vancouver and Whistler.
