= McBride station =

Railway station in British Columbia, Canada

McBride
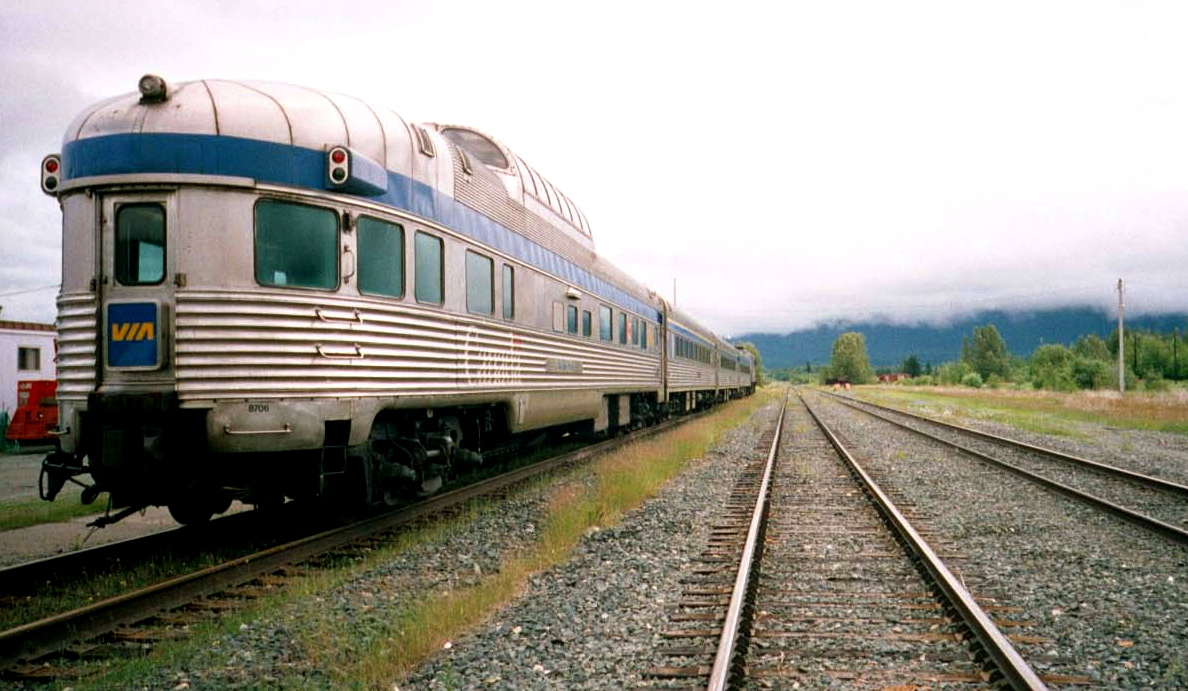
- Via Rail park car at McBride station

General information
- Location: Main Street & 1st Avenue; McBride, British Columbia; Canada
- Coordinates: 53°18′N 120°10′W
- Platforms: 1

Construction
- Structure type: Sign post
- Parking: available

History
- Opened: 1919
- Former names: Grand Trunk Pacific Railway

Services
Preceding station	Via Rail	Following station
Goat River toward Prince Rupert	Jasper–Prince Rupert	Dunster toward Jasper

Former services
Preceding station	Canadian National Railway	Following station
Craibenn toward Prince Rupert	Prince Rupert – Jasper	Eddy toward Jasper

Heritage Railway Station (Canada)
- Official name: McBride Canadian National Railways Station
- Designated: 1991
- Reference no.: 6631
Location
- Location within British Columbia Location within Canada

McBride station is on the Canadian National Railway mainline in McBride, British Columbia. The station is served by Via Rail's Jasper–Prince Rupert train.

== History ==
When originally built by the Grand Trunk Pacific Railway in 1919, the layout of the station was a 1 1/2-story wood building with park land on both sides, in keeping with its role as a railway centre and divisional point on the line.

It became a federally Designated Heritage Railway Station in 1991.

== See also ==
- List of designated heritage railway stations of Canada
