= Dome Creek station =

Railway station in British Columbia, Canada

Dome Creek

General information
- Location: Dome Creek, British Columbia; Canada
- Coordinates: 53°44′53.9″N 121°01′48.7″W
- Platforms: 1

Construction
- Structure type: Sign post

History
- Original company: Grand Trunk Pacific Railway

Services
| Preceding station | Via Rail | Following station |
|---|---|---|
| Bend toward Prince Rupert | Jasper–Prince Rupert | Loos toward Jasper |

Former services
| Preceding station | Canadian National Railway | Following station |
|---|---|---|
| Bend toward Prince Rupert | Prince Rupert – Jasper | Kidd toward Jasper |
Location
- Location within British Columbia Location within Canada

Dome Creek station is on the Canadian National Railway mainline in Dome Creek, British Columbia. Via Rail's Jasper–Prince Rupert train calls at the station as a flag stop.

== History ==
The creek mouth was 156 miles (251 km) from Fort George via the Fraser. Dome Creek has historically described both a specific place and the general area several miles on either side, such as Mile 141, or Mile 142. With river access to bring in labour and supplies, the vicinity may have comprised 2,000 workers housed in construction camps stretching from Mile 141 to 146. Foley, Welch and Stewart (FW&S) was the prime contractor for the Mountain Section. However, owing to unprecedented low water limiting navigation, FW&S's larger boats remained berthed from early winter, 1911, to spring, 1913. Cement supplies for the bridge were stranded at the Goat River Rapids, awaiting sleigh transportation once winter arrived. The concrete for the bridge's east abutment was poured before the end of 1912. During spring 1913, the west abutment was completed. When the river thawed, the FW&S boats were launched to bring supplies from the railhead base at Tête Jaune.

The low-level Dome Creek and Hansard railway bridges curtailed the previous steamboat navigation. The railway started construction, despite not having received approval from Ottawa's Board of Railway Commissioners with respect to their height clearances, which triggered a response by the Barnard steamboat organization. The Dome Creek bridge crosses the Fraser at Mile 56.7, Fraser Subdivision (formerly about Mile 146, though contemporary articles inadvertently quoted instead the camp locations at Mile 145, or Mile 142). A temporary wooden trestle carried the track until the steel bridge's completion.

The Bates & Rogers Construction Co. were the contractors for the bridge substructure (piers and abutments) and the Canadian Bridge Co. for the superstructure (steelwork). By August, the steel bridge girders were being installed, and the railway tracks had been laid from Mile 53 (Tête Jaune) to Mile 138, and then Mile 142. The Railway Commission having handed over control to the Grand Trunk Pacific Railway (GTP) to operate this section, their first passenger arrived at Mile 141 that month. Their directive for a drawbridge reversed, the Railway Commission sanctioned the low-level bridge, which by October was nearing completion.

During construction, small seven-ton locomotives operated on the temporary narrow gauge (24-inch) track laid in advance of the permanent track. A surviving example exists in the Prince George Railway & Forestry Museum. When one such locomotive sank into the muskeg nearby, a second one also sank while trying to extract it. At least one of these is believed to be preserved in the bog. The location included a water tower and wye. An alighting passenger, and the laying of a 10-foot wide cinder sidewalk for passengers that winter, suggest a 1921 opening date for the station nestled between Bend to its northwest, and Kidd to its southeast.

Pumpman John (Jack) E. (1876–1941) & Lottie Brennan, who arrived in 1915, were part of the community's social circle. Retiring in 1940 after 25 years as pumpman, he died before receiving his first superannuation cheque. A guard, who was presumably armed, defended the crossing during World War II. Speeders or railway cars provided the only transport for medical emergencies, but often it came too late. Trains sometimes struck straying livestock.

When the Prince George-McBride way freights, coming from opposite directions, passed at Dome Creek during the 1950s, there was a sufficient break for passengers to change trains. In 1985, a derailment occurred at Mile 55. The station building, which was opened, closed and cleaned daily until the early 1990s, went in 1996. In 2000, the section crew relocated. The present flag stop location appears established.

| Service | c.1921–1931 | 1932–c.1939 | c.1940–c.1958 | c.1959–1965 | 1965–1966 | 1966–1967 | 1967–1977 | 1977–present |
|---|---|---|---|---|---|---|---|---|
| Passenger | Flag stop | | Regular stop | Flag stop | Regular stop | Flag stop | Regular stop | Flag stop |
| Way freight | | Flag stop | Regular stop | Regular stop | Regular stop | Regular stop | Regular stop | |

| Infrastructure | 1920 | 1922 | 1933 | 1943* | 1960–72 | 1977–92 |
|---|---|---|---|---|---|---|
| | Mile No. | Mile No. | Mile No. | Mile No. | Mile No. | Mile No. |
| Wye | 54.1 | 54.1 | 55.2 | 55.2 | 55.2 | 55.2 |
| Water Tower | 54.1 | 54.1 | 55.6 | 55.7 | | |
| Station | | 54.1 | 55.6 | 55.7 | 55.6 | 55.9 |

- Assumedly, a remeasurement confirmed the station was closer to Mile 55.6

| Other Tracks | Mile No. | 1920 | 1922 | 1933 | 1940 | 1960 | 1965 | 1968 |
|---|---|---|---|---|---|---|---|---|
| (Capacity Length) | | Cars | Cars | Cars | Cars | Cars | Cars | Cars |
| ? Partners | 54 | | | | unknown | | | |
| Upper Fraser Lumber | 54.2 | | unknown | | | | | |
| Dome Mountain Lumber | 54.6 | unknown | unknown | | | | | |
| Wm Coop | 55.2 | | | 28 | | | | |
| Red Rock Lumber | 55.6 | | | | | 10 | 21 | |
| Northwood Pulp | 55.6 | | | | | | | 10 |
| Pioneer Pole & Supply | 55.9 | | | 8 | | | | |
| Nance Lumber | 56.0 | | | | | 10 | | |
| Wm. T. Nance | 56.0 | | | | | | 9 | |
| Northwood Pulp | 56.0 | | | | | | | 8 |

== Sources ==
- Olson, Raymond (2014). Ghost Towns on the East Line. Self-published. ISBN 9780986924316.
- Wheeler, Marilyn (1979). The Robson Valley Story. McBride Robson Valley Story Group. ISBN 0969020902.
