= Croydon, British Columbia =

- Locality
- Location of Croydon in British Columbia
- Coordinates: 53°04′00″N 119°43′00″W
- Country: Canada
- Province: British Columbia
- Regional District: Fraser-Fort George
- Time zone: UTC−07:00 (PT)

Croydon is a former flag stop on the Canadian National Railway east of McBride, British Columbia. It was named after Croydon, a borough and large district in South London in England. It is approximately 10 km south of Dunster.
