= Quesnel station =

Railway station in British Columbia, Canada

Quesnel
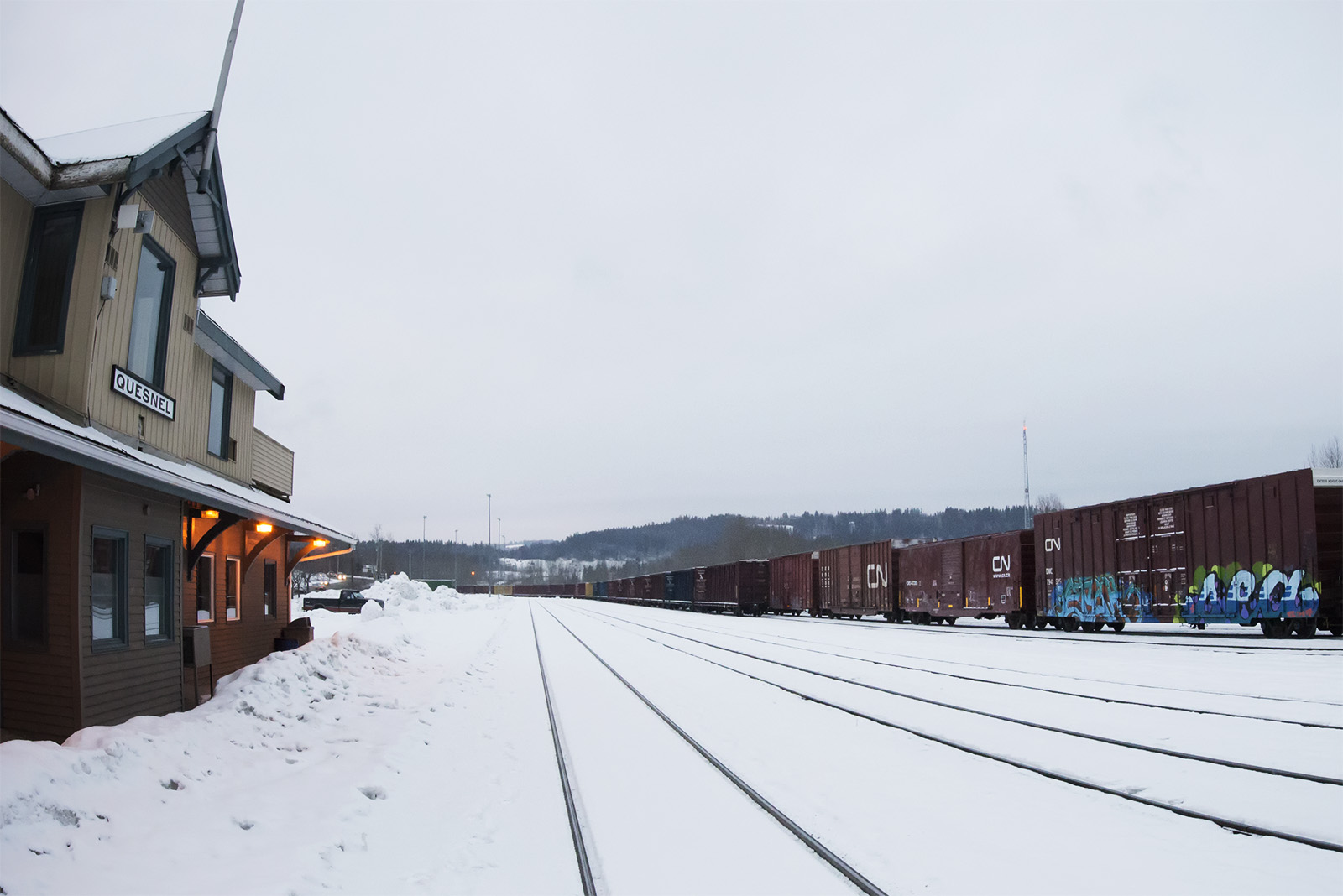

General information
- Location: 710 Legion Drive; Quesnel, BC; Canada
- Coordinates: 52.974081°N 122.491867°W

Construction
- Structure type: two-storey building

History
- Opened: July 30, 1921
- Original company: Pacific Great Eastern Railway (1921–1972); British Columbia Railway (1972–1984); BC Rail (1984–2002)

Former services
Preceding station	Rocky Mountaineer	Following station
Whistler towards North Vancouver	Rainforest to Gold Rush	Jasper Terminus
Whistler towards North Vancouver	Coastal Passage	Jasper Terminus
Pre-2002
Preceding station	BC Rail	Following station
Australian toward North Vancouver	Main line	Abhau toward Prince George
Alexandria toward North Vancouver	Cariboo Prospector (limited service)	Strathnaver toward Prince George
Location
- Location within British Columbia

Quesnel station in Quesnel, British Columbia, Canada is a railway station. It was most recently used by the Rocky Mountaineer train service on the Rainforest to Gold Rush route until 2026.

The station was originally established for the Pacific Great Eastern Railway, later called BC Rail and the midpoint for the Cariboo Dayliner service from North Vancouver, until that service ended on October 31, 2002.

The two-storey station building was constructed in 1921 as a "Standard No.3" design with a rectangular shape and gable roof.
