= Terrace station =

Railway station in British Columbia, Canada

Terrace
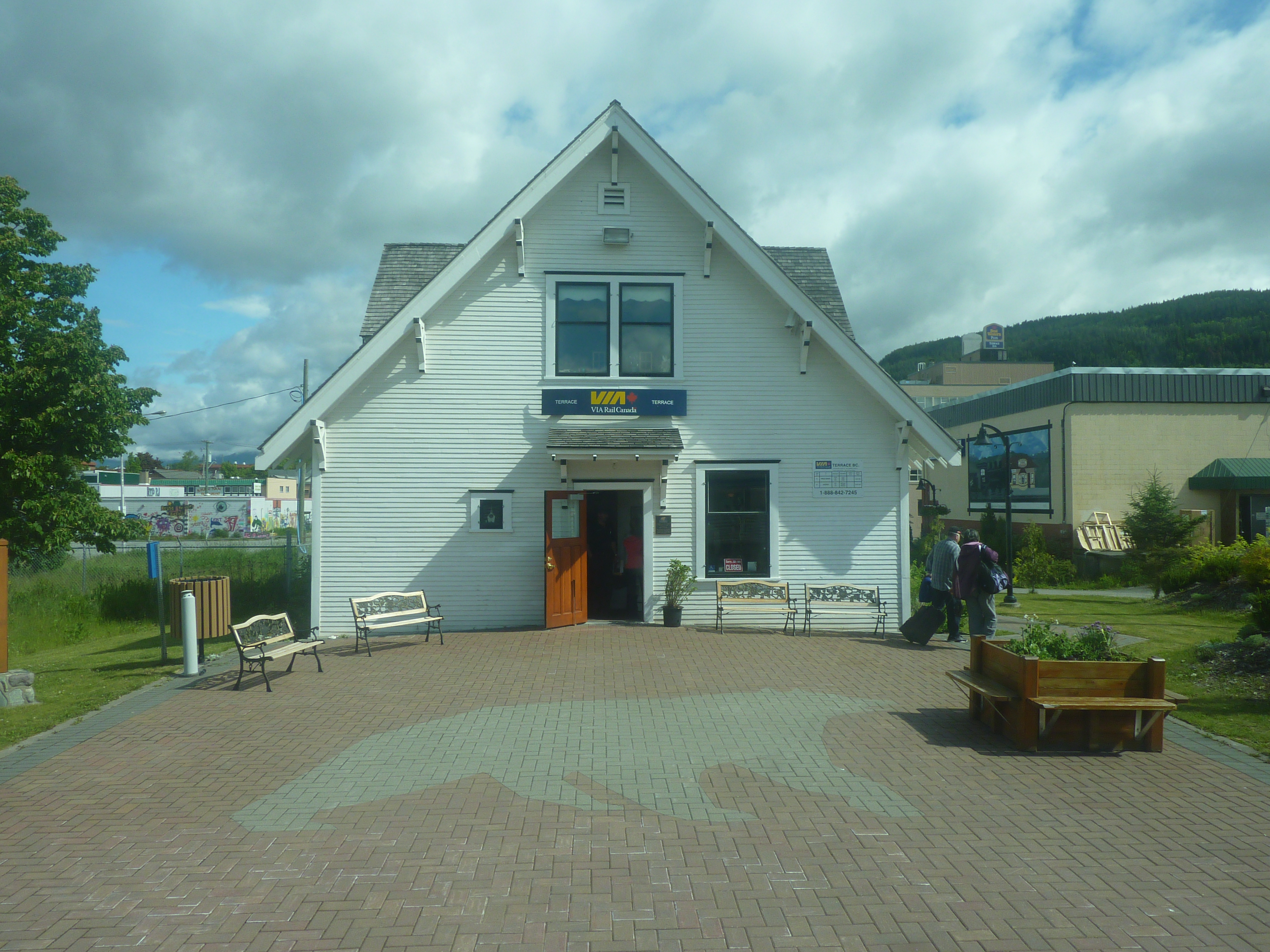

General information
- Location: 3100 Kalum Street; Terrace, British Columbia; V8G 4L1
- Coordinates: 54°30′53″N 128°35′12″W
- Line: Jasper–Prince Rupert train
- Platforms: 1

Construction
- Structure type: Shelter
- Parking: available
- Accessible: yes

Services
Preceding station	Via Rail	Following station
Kwinitsa toward Prince Rupert	Jasper–Prince Rupert	Usk toward Jasper

Former services
Preceding station	Canadian National Railway	Following station
Remo toward Prince Rupert	Prince Rupert – Jasper	Dobies toward Jasper
Location

Terrace station is a Via Rail station on the Canadian National Railway mainline in Terrace, British Columbia, Canada. The station is served by Via Rail's Jasper–Prince Rupert train.

== History ==
In late October 1910, the eastward advance of the Grand Trunk Pacific Railway rail head from Prince Rupert reached the Kitsumkalum River. In early November 1910, tracklaying passed over this completed bridge at Mile 91 and through mile 100 (Vanarsdol).

In 1911, the standard-design Plan 100‐152 (Bohi's Type E) station building was erected. The next year, when a roadmaster riding eastward on a railway motorcycle collided with an oncoming locomotive, he was fatally flung into the Skeena.

In 1927, a falling rock about one mile east of Terrace crashed through the roof of a westbound Canadian National Railway (CN) baggage car killing an employee. In 1929, an addition to the station enlarged the waiting room and the agent accommodation.

In June 1955, a Prince Rupert–Kitimat passenger shuttle began on a trial basis, which replaced the Kitimat mixed train. The line officially opened the next month, and the Kitimat station was completed later in the year.

In April 1957, the shuttle discontinued west of Terrace. In April 1958, when passenger rail was discontinued to Kitimat, a private bus operator took over the route. In 1988, Via Rail erected a stationette.

Built around 1914 and designated a national historic site in 1982, the George Little House was moved to its present location in 2004. The next year, the renovated main floor became tourism facilities and the Via Rail waiting room, replacing the stationette.

== Sources ==
- TRHS (2002). Terrace: Incorporated in 1927: 75 years of growth. Terrace Regional Historical Society. ISBN 0-9730611-1-1.
