= Jasper–Prince Rupert train =

Via Rail service between Jasper, Alberta and Prince Rupert, British Columbia

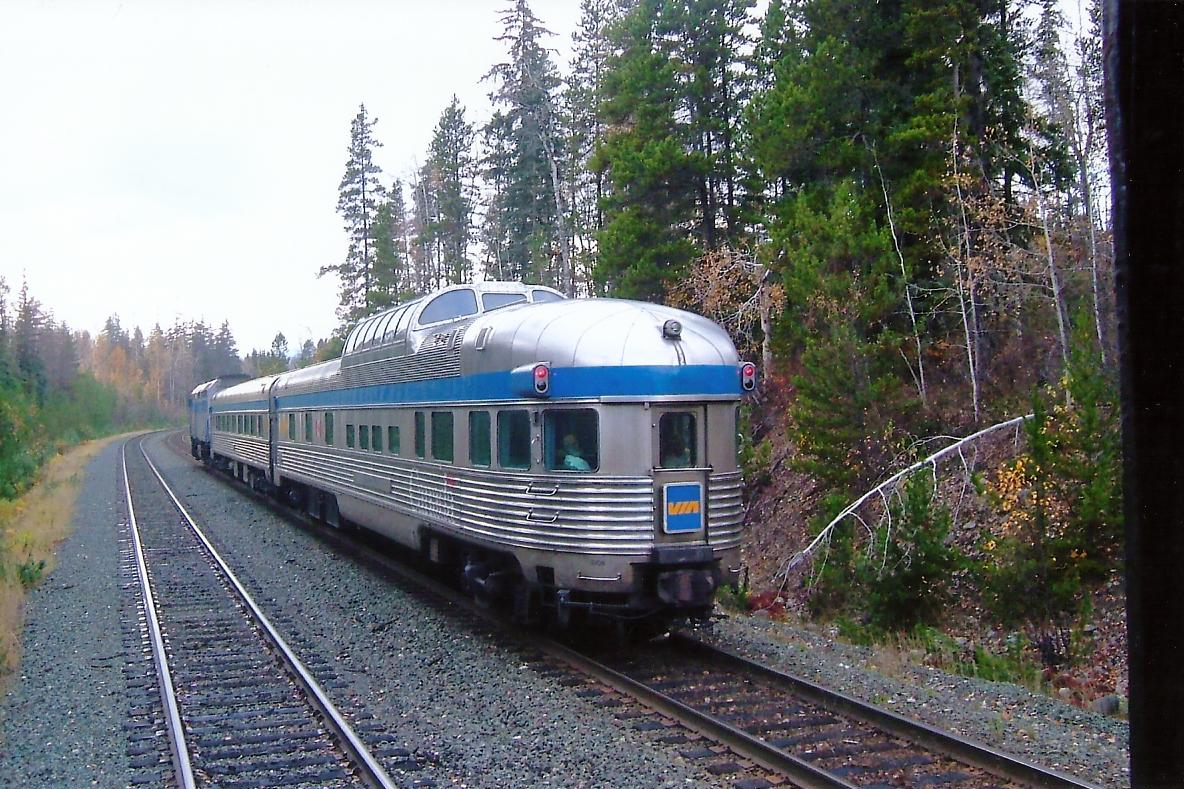
- The Skeena heading towards Prince Rupert in 2005

Overview
- Service type: Intercity rail
- Status: In Service
- Locale: Canada
- Current operator: Via Rail
- Former operator: Canadian National Railway
- Ridership: 307 weekly (FY 2019)
- Annual ridership: 16,327 (FY 2019)
- Website: Via Rail - Jasper-Prince Rupert

Route
- Termini: Jasper; Prince Rupert
- Average journey time: 2 days
- Service frequency: 3 times weekly

On-board services
- Classes: Economy, Touring

Technical
- Rolling stock: F40PH locomotives Skyline series
- Track gauge: 1,435 mm (4 ft 8 1/2 in)
- Operating speed: 65mph (104 km/h)
- Timetable number: 5, 6

The Jasper–Prince Rupert train (formerly the Skeena and Panorama, now known as Trains 5/6, sometimes called The Rupert Rocket) is a Canadian passenger train service operated by Via Rail between Jasper, Alberta, Prince George and Prince Rupert in British Columbia.

== Route history ==
In 1911, with station names selected, passenger service was available for the first 100 miles (160 km) eastward from Prince Rupert to Kitselas (formerly called Vanarsdol). Following the arrival of the tracks at Skeena Crossing in March 1912, the Grand Trunk Pacific Railway (GTPR) was offering passenger service from Prince Rupert to Hazelton with a ferry across the Skeena. By 1913, Rose Lake was a temporary terminal station location. In October 1913, the first passenger train arrived at Smithers.

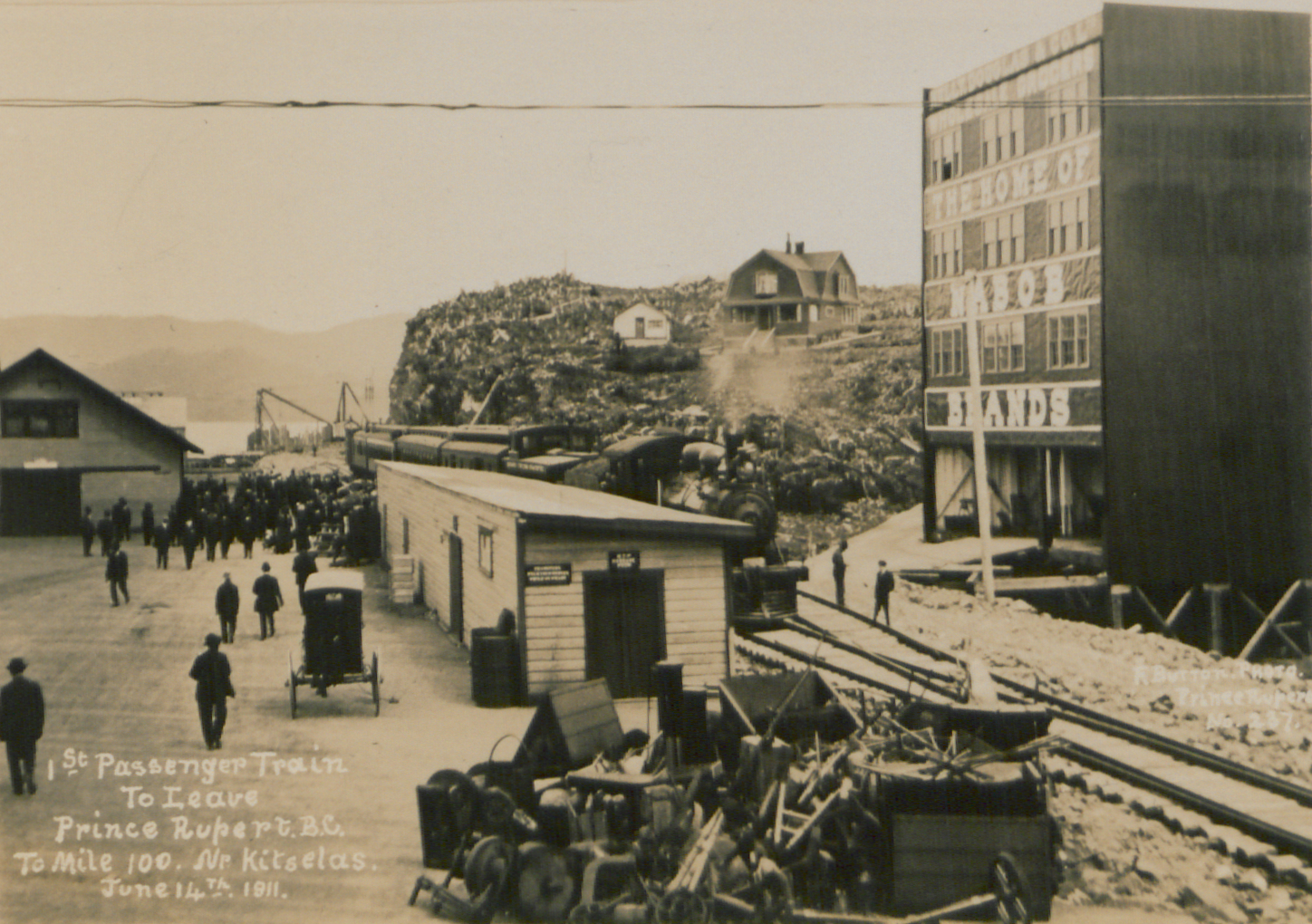
First passenger train leaves Prince Rupert for Mile 100, June 1911

In September 1912, an Alberta–Tête Jaune weekly passenger service began. In August 1913, the first GTPR passenger arrived at Kidd. From late 1913 to early 1914, immediately west of Dome Creek was a temporary terminal station location. Foley, Welch and Stewart (FW&S), the prime contractors, provided passenger and freight service on completed sections of the line as the railhead advanced. FW&S ran the first such westbound train into Prince George on January 30, 1914. In March 1914, GTPR passenger service coverage comprised Prince Rupert–Priestly,^{a} Prince George–McBride,^{b} and McBride–Edmonton^{d} (McBride being an overnight stop). However, the track conditions west of Hansard made the initial service unreliable. The Prince Rupert–Edmonton through service,^{a} which inaugurated that September, took 22–23 hours for Prince Rupert–Prince George, and the same for Prince George–Edmonton (about 11–13 hours for Prince George–Jasper). In following decades, the latter varied little, but the former decreased to 20–22 hours. With fewer stops, this is now about 12 hours and 7–9 hours respectively.

Maintaining services, Canadian National Railway (CNR) took over the insolvent GTPR.^{b} From 1922, a summer-month schedule operated^{c} until the end of each halibut season, because the passenger train also carried frozen fish as fast freight. Once regular passenger service ended in 1931, sleeping and dining cars were attached to the three-times-weekly way freight. In addition, from 1934 to 1942, a once or twice weekly summer passenger service operated with limited stops. When the US Army turned Prince Rupert into a major supply base in early 1942, four or five troop trains arrived daily, carrying 75,000 soldiers bound for Alaska. In 1943, the passenger service permanently expanded.^{c} With wartime demand ending, frequency reduced,^{b} despite protests, for the fish/passenger train, but was restored in 1951^{c} to cater for new industrial developments at Prince Rupert and Kitimat. In 1954, new sleeper and passenger cars were introduced. A way freight ran on the Terrace–Kitimat branch line from January 1955, until replaced by a passenger service June 1955–November 1957.

In 1962, although Prince George–Jasper remained unchanged,^{c} Prince Rupert–Prince George frequency reduced,^{b} but restored during the 1965 summer and from the 1966 summer.^{c} In 1968, the whole route cut back,^{b} except for summer on Prince George–Jasper.^{c} Although CN experienced significant losses on the Prince Rupert–Jasper passenger service, an application to discontinue the route was denied in 1972, but CN became eligible for an 80 percent federal subsidy. Sustaining losses of $3.3m (on costs of $4.1m) in 1974 for the 25,000 passengers carried, CN's reapplication to discontinue was again denied. In 1977, Via Rail was launched as a CN subsidiary to gradually take over CN and CP passenger services. Via maintained the CN service levels,^{b} broadening the summer schedule to the whole route.^{d}

From 1981, the lower levels applied year round.^{b} Despite losses of $6.6m in 1988 for the 26,000 passengers carried, safeguarding isolated communities gave the route a reprieve from closure. However, the subsidy of $480 for every passenger carried made the route difficult to justify retaining, and alternatives remained under review.

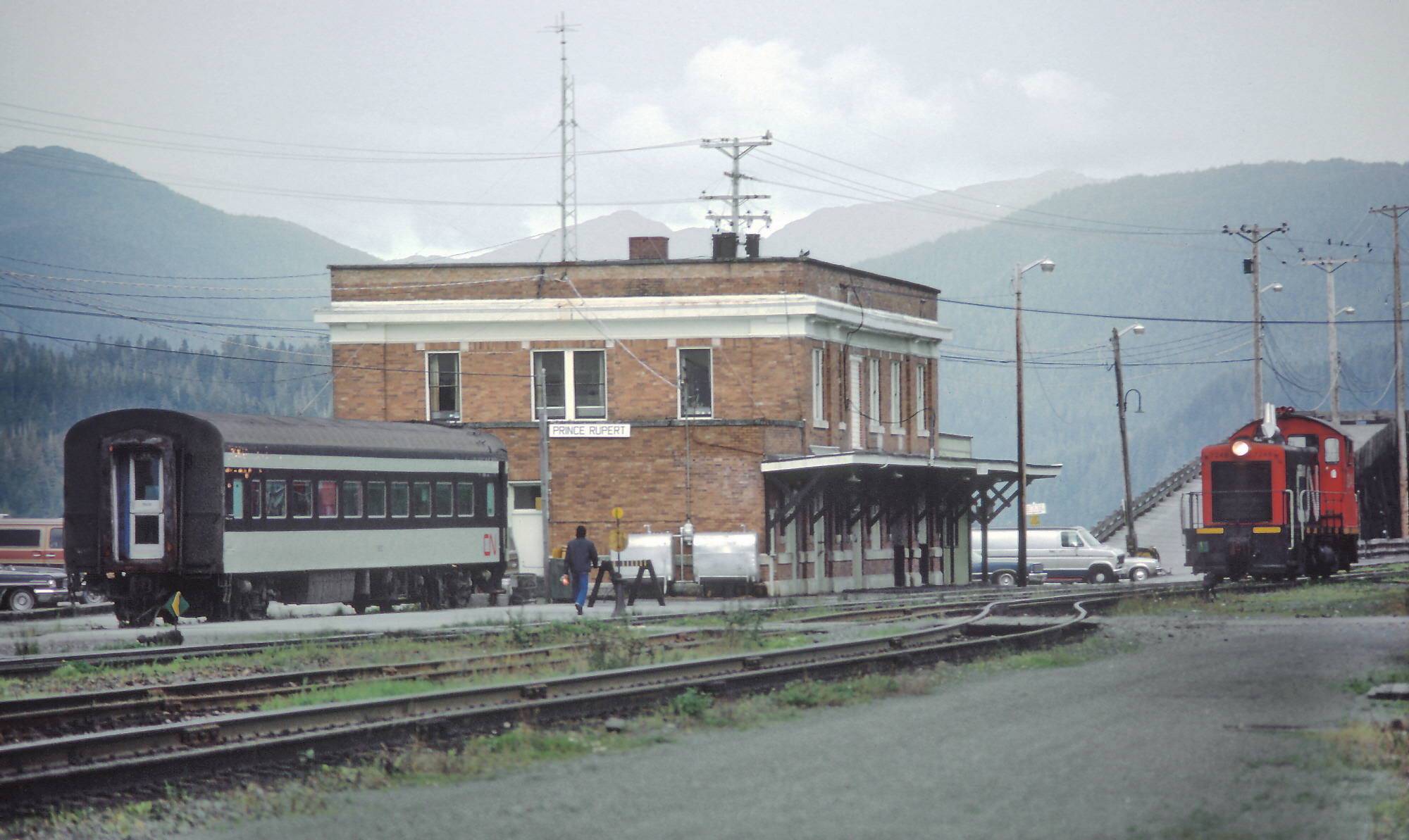
CN Prince Rupert yard in October 1979

After extensive consultation, Via proposed an overnight stop in Prince George and a daylight schedule for the Prince Rupert leg that would enable tourists to enjoy the outstanding scenery. With ridership falling seven percent between 1990 and 1992, and a $9m deficit, the focus switched to possible service cuts and the daytime option was shelved in 1993. Eventually implemented in 1996, the daylight schedule also provided better connections with coastal ferry services and the BC Rail Cariboo Dayliner. Touring Class (with three meals per day and exclusive access to the Panoramic Dome car and the Park car) was eliminated starting in 2020 due to COVID-19.

From the 1920s, CN promoted its "Triangle Tour". Rail tour operators such as Rocky Mountaineer have included the train or rails as part of various "circle" itineraries.

^a. Regular passenger service twice weekly each way.
^b. Regular passenger service three times weekly each way.
^c. Regular passenger service six times weekly each way.
^d. Regular passenger service daily each way.

== Present time ==
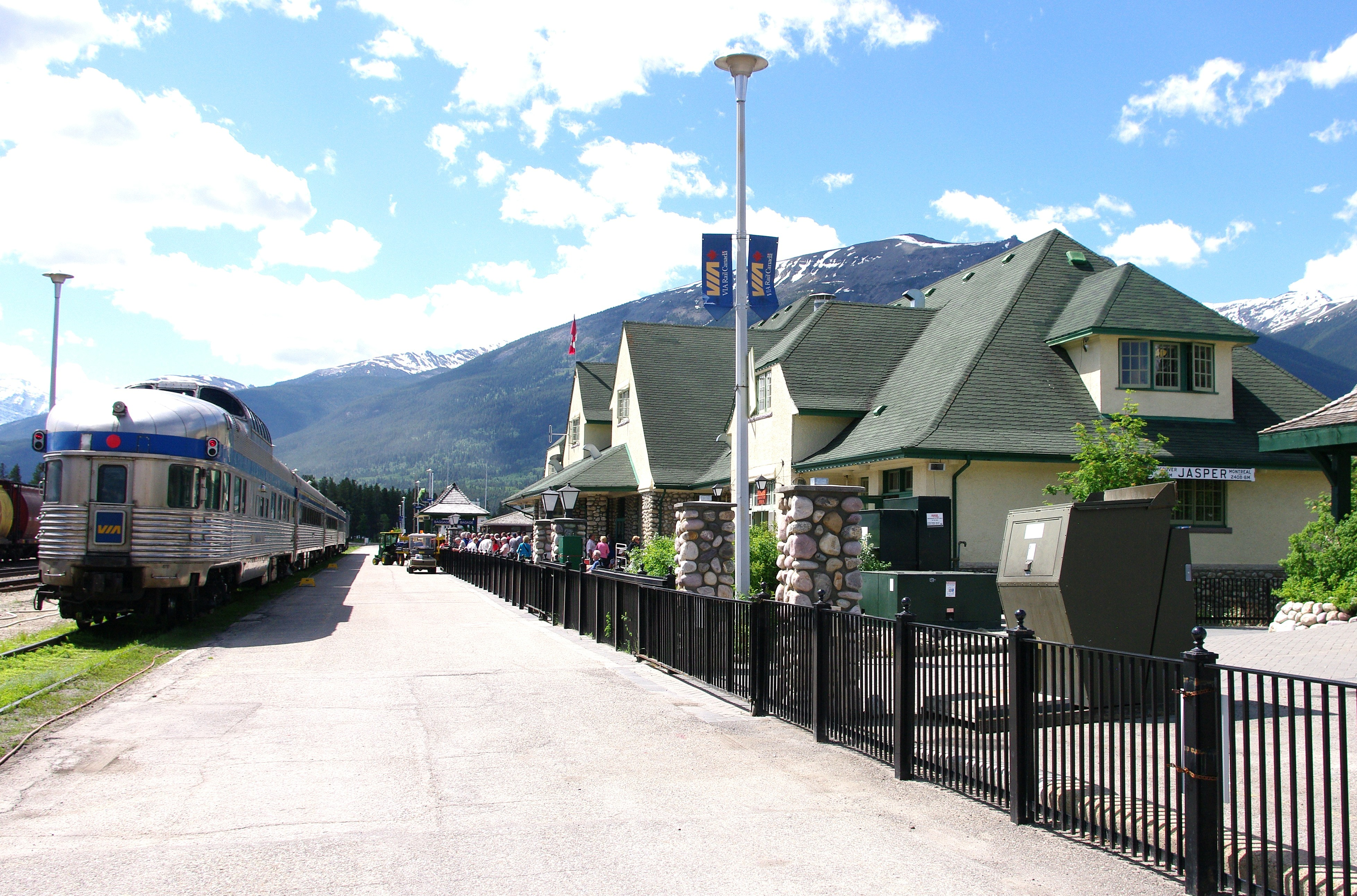
The train at the Jasper station platform

The train operates three times weekly, departing Jasper on Wednesday, Friday and Sunday. The return-service departs Prince Rupert on the same days of the week. The journey takes two days with an overnight stop at Prince George.

The train offers only Economy Class (Touring Class was eliminated in 2020) which includes access to the dome car, and a selection of light meals, snacks, and drinks.

The train offers connections at Prince Rupert between the BC Ferries service to Port Hardy and Haida Gwaii, the Alaska Marine Highway service to points in southeast Alaska, and a connection at Jasper to the Via Rail Canadian to Vancouver and Toronto.

== Patronage and subsidy ==
Year	Revenue ($000)	Costs ($000)	Loss ($000)	Passengers/year	Subsidy/passenger ($)	Subsidy/passenger mile ($)
2013	1,383	11,232	9,849	18,631	528.61	1.55
2014	1,446	11,138	9,692	17,863	542.56	1.56
2015	1,495	11,071	9,576	17,365	551.40	1.66
2016	1,491	9,256	7,765	16,784	462.64	1.35
2017	1,828	9,676	7,848	18,018	435.56	1.27
2018	1,500	9,788	8,288	15,956	519.49	1.59
2019	1,405	9,816	8,411	16,327	515.16	1.62
2020	137	6,986	6,849	2,268	3,019.84	11.35
2021	208	6,344	6,136	3,387	1,811.63	7.29
2022	595	8,466	7,851	7,385	1,063.10	3.17
2023	1,108	11,730	10,622	12,038	882.37	2.87
2024	1,004	12,891	11,887	13,141	904.57	3.30
2025	1,261	14,662	13,401	14,841	902.97	3.11

A significant portion of the traffic on the train originates with a Jasper-based tour that offers a day-time package west to Dunster or east from McBride, with the opposite leg completed by bus.

== Scenery ==
The departure from Jasper takes the train past Moose Lake, before traversing Mount Robson Provincial Park. In the early decades, passengers could alight onto the viewing platform 4.2 km (2.6 mi) west of the station to view Mount Robson. The same was true above Bulkley Gate, near Hazelton. This section between Smithers and Terrace features mountain scenery, and the run east of Prince Rupert is beside the Skeena River.

== Stations/stops ==
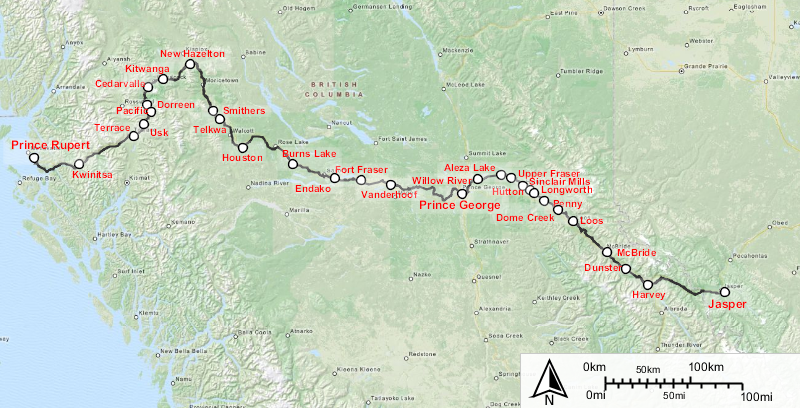
Via Rail Jasper–Prince Rupert

Station/Stop		km	Miles	Time zone	Regular/ flag stop	Date erected^{d} & Building design plan		History and community	Archit. Merit	Current facilities CN/Via Other
Jasper	^{e}	0	0	Mountain	terminus	1912 100-155; 1925 100-205	^{f}^{g}	Jasper, formerly Fitzhugh	listed	counter, washrooms
Harvey		106	66	Pacific	flag	c.1988	^{i}	replaced Tête Jaune		none
Dunster		142	88	Pacific	flag	1913 100-152	^{g}^{h}			none museum
McBride	^{e}	174	108	Pacific	regular	1913 100-156; 1919 100-167	^{f}^{g}		listed	none visitor centre
Goat River		217	135	Pacific	flag	1914 100-152; 1953; 110-254 conv. bunkhouse	^{h}	formerly Brundall, Rooney		none
Loos		232	144	Pacific	flag	1914 100-152; ? 100-41	^{f}^{h}	formerly Crescent Island		none
Dome Creek		262	163	Pacific	flag	c.1921	^{i}	Dome Creek		none
Bend		265	165	Pacific	flag	1914 100-152	^{h}	Bend		none
Penny		285	177	Pacific	flag	c.1917; 1927 conv. tool shed; 1947 100-152	^{i}^{f}˸^{h}	Penny		none
Longworth		301	187	Pacific	flag	1914 100-152	^{h}	Longworth		none
Hutton		314	195	Pacific	flag	1914 100-152	^{h}	Hutton		none
Sinclair Mills		319	198	Pacific	flag	c.1930 110-217 converted bunkhouse				none
McGregor		331	206	Pacific	flag	c.1959	^{i}	McGregor		none
Upper Fraser		341	212	Pacific	flag	c.1941	^{i}	Upper Fraser		none
Aleza Lake		349	217	Pacific	flag	1914 100-152; c.1960	^{h}˸^{i}	Aleza Lake		none
Willow River		378	235	Pacific	flag	1914 100-152	^{h}	Willow River		none
Prince George	^{e}	409	254	Pacific	overnight	1913; 1922 100-136; 1970 Special	^{i}	Prince George		counter, washrooms
Vanderhoof		520	323	Pacific	regular	1914 100-152; 1924 100-72; 1960 100-345	^{h}			none
Fort Fraser		560	348	Pacific	flag	1916 100-162; 1923 100-72; c.1971 100-41B				none
Endako	^{e}	594	369	Pacific	regular	1914; 1922 100-143; 1970 trailer; 1985 hybrid b'house	^{i}			none
Burns Lake		650	404	Pacific	regular	1914 100-152; 1952 100-332	^{h}			none
Houston		734	456	Pacific	regular	1914 100-152; 1920; 100-168; 1971 Special	^{f}^{h}			none
Telkwa		780	485	Pacific	flag	1914 100-162; 1922 100-168		Telkwa		none
Smithers	^{e}	795	494	Pacific	regular	1915; 1919 100-166	^{g}^{i}	Smithers	listed	shelter, washrooms
New Hazelton		869	540	Pacific	flag	1913 100-152; 1980	^{h}˸^{i}	New Hazelton		none
Kitwanga		912	567	Pacific	flag	1912 100-152	^{h}	Kitwanga		none
Cedarvale		933	580	Pacific	flag	1912 100-152; 1931 100-41B	^{f}^{h}	Cedarvale		none
Dorreen		957	595	Pacific	flag	1913 100-152	^{h}			none
Pacific		967	601	Pacific	flag	1913 100-155; 1935 100-277	^{f}	Pacific, British Columbia; formerly Nicholl		none
Usk		988	614	Pacific	flag	1912 100-152; ? conv. b'house	^{h}	Usk, British Columbia		none
Terrace	^{e}	1,007	626	Pacific	regular	1911 100-152; 1960 100-391	^{h}	formerly Littleton		shelter, washrooms
Kwinitsa		1,084	674	Pacific	flag	1911 100-152	^{h}	North Coast Regional District; building moved		none
Cassiar Cannery		1,136	706	Pacific	flag	c.1916	^{i}	inactive as a stop c.1990 to 2016		none
Prince Rupert	^{e}	1,160	721	Pacific	terminus	1907 140-210; 1922 100-135	^{j}	Prince Rupert	listed	shelter, washrooms

^d. Stop activation usually preceded station construction by months or longer.
^e. CN divisional point.
^f. Earliest station building destroyed by fire.
^g. Buildings owned and maintained by Parks Canada, Dunster Station Museum, the Village of McBride, and Smithers Community Services Association, respectively.
^h. GTP standard design (Bohi's Type E).
^i. Unspecified design.
^j. Opened in 1907 as the Prince Rupert Inn, the building was converted into a temporary station.
