= Dome Creek, British Columbia =

- Community
- Location of Dome Creek in British Columbia
- Coordinates: 53°45′00″N 121°02′00″W
- Country: Canada
- Province: British Columbia
- Land District: Cariboo
- Regional District: Fraser-Fort George
- Geographic Region: Robson Valley
- Elevation: 637 m (2,090 ft)
- Time zone: UTC−07:00 (PT)
- Area codes: 250, 778, 236, & 672

Dome Creek, between Penny and Crescent Spur on the southwest side of the Fraser River in central British Columbia, provides a year-round destination for hiking, hunting, snowshoeing and snowmobiling. The scattered community of about 40 permanent residents clusters the railway line and the actual creek (crossed by its own road and rail bridges). The creek and town are similarly named after Dome Mountain. The recreational facility, which occupies the former school building, houses the community hall, a public library and a museum, with a small rustic post office nearby. The visitor centre (former library) stands at the front of the lot occupied by the former community hall. (Content specific to Bend or Kidd is contained in those articles.)

== Transportation ==
A trackside signpost marks the flag stop for Via Rail's Jasper – Prince Rupert train. The immediate Via Rail stops are Bend to the northwest and Loos to the southeast.

When Greyhound cancelled this route in 2018, this scheduled bus stop closed. BC Bus North, the replacement operator, runs non-stop between Prince George and McBride.

== History ==
=== Railway ===
The creek mouth was 156 miles (251 km) from Fort George via the Fraser. Dome Creek has historically described both a specific place and the general area several miles on either side, such as Mile 141, or Mile 142. With river access to bring in labour and supplies, the vicinity may have comprised 2,000 workers housed in construction camps stretching from Mile 141 to 146. Foley, Welch and Stewart (FW&S) was the prime contractor for the Mountain Section. However, owing to unprecedented low water limiting navigation, FW&S's larger boats remained berthed from early winter, 1911, to spring, 1913. Cement supplies for the bridge were stranded at the Goat River Rapids, awaiting sleigh transportation once winter arrived. The concrete for the bridge's east abutment was poured before the end of 1912. During spring 1913, the west abutment was completed. When the river thawed, the FW&S boats were launched to bring supplies from the railhead base at Tête Jaune.

The low-level Dome Creek and Hansard railway bridges curtailed the previous steamboat navigation. The railway started construction, despite not having received approval from Ottawa's Board of Railway Commissioners with respect to their height clearances, which triggered a response by the Barnard steamboat organization. The Dome Creek bridge crosses the Fraser at Mile 56.7, Fraser Subdivision (formerly about Mile 146, though contemporary articles inadvertently quoted instead the camp locations at Mile 145, or Mile 142). A temporary wooden trestle carried the track until the steel bridge's completion.

The Bates & Rogers Construction Co. were the contractors for the bridge substructure (piers and abutments) and the Canadian Bridge Co. for the superstructure (steelwork). By August, the steel bridge girders were being installed, and the railway tracks had been laid from Mile 53 (Tête Jaune) to Mile 138, and then Mile 142. The Railway Commission having handed over control to the Grand Trunk Pacific Railway (GTP) to operate this section, their first passenger arrived at Mile 141 that month. Their directive for a drawbridge reversed, the Railway Commission sanctioned the low-level bridge, which by October was nearing completion.

During construction, small seven-ton locomotives operated on the temporary narrow gauge (24-inch) track laid in advance of the permanent track. A surviving example exists in the Prince George Railway & Forestry Museum. When one such locomotive sank into the muskeg nearby, a second one also sank while trying to extract it. At least one of these is believed to be preserved in the bog. The location included a water tower and wye. An alighting passenger, and the laying of a 10-foot wide cinder sidewalk for passengers that winter, suggest a 1921 opening date for the station nestled between Bend to its northwest, and Kidd to its southeast.

Pumpman John (Jack) E. (1876–1941) & Lottie Brennan, who arrived in 1915, were part of the community's social circle. Retiring in 1940 after 25 years as pumpman, he died before receiving his first superannuation cheque. A guard, who was presumably armed, defended the crossing during World War II. Speeders or railway cars provided the only transport for medical emergencies, but often it came too late. Trains sometimes struck straying livestock.

When the Prince George-McBride way freights, coming from opposite directions, passed at Dome Creek during the 1950s, there was a sufficient break for passengers to change trains. In 1985, a derailment occurred at Mile 55. The station building, which was opened, closed and cleaned daily until the early 1990s, went in 1996. In 2000, the section crew relocated. The present flag stop location appears established.

Service	c.1921–1931	1932–c.1939	c.1940–c.1958	c.1959–1965	1965–1966	1966–1967	1967–1977	1977–present
Passenger	Flag stop		Regular stop	Flag stop	Regular stop	Flag stop	Regular stop	Flag stop
Way freight		Flag stop	Regular stop	Regular stop	Regular stop	Regular stop	Regular stop	

Infrastructure	1920	1922	1933	1943*	1960–72	1977–92
	Mile No.	Mile No.	Mile No.	Mile No.	Mile No.	Mile No.
Wye	54.1	54.1	55.2	55.2	55.2	55.2
Water Tower	54.1	54.1	55.6	55.7		
Station		54.1	55.6	55.7	55.6	55.9

- Assumedly, a remeasurement confirmed the station was closer to Mile 55.6

Other Tracks	Mile No.	1920	1922	1933	1940	1960	1965	1968
(Capacity Length)		Cars	Cars	Cars	Cars	Cars	Cars	Cars
? Partners	54				unknown			
Upper Fraser Lumber	54.2		unknown					
Dome Mountain Lumber	54.6	unknown	unknown					
Wm Coop	55.2			28				
Red Rock Lumber	55.6					10	21	
Northwood Pulp	55.6							10
Pioneer Pole & Supply	55.9			8				
Nance Lumber	56.0					10		
Wm. T. Nance	56.0						9	
Northwood Pulp	56.0							8

=== Pioneer Community ===
Dome Creek, an ideal location for timber, tourists and hunting, developed possibly as more than one settlement, that ultimately consolidated westward at its present location. Over time, both the industrial and railway infrastructure moved in that direction. James O. Kendall, manager of Upper Fraser Lumber Co., was the inaugural postmaster 1916–19.

John (Jack) W. Carneski (1893–1975), who remained single, operated his mixed farm until death immediately east of Dome Creek on the north half of Lot 3275. Claiming a 1911 arrival, the first record of his presence was 1924. Among the few remaining pioneers in the vicinity, he outlived James B. Hooker (1884–1955) of Bend and Ernest H. Jensen (1890–1966) of Kidd.

By 1920, Mr. Bremner ran a store. Rancher James (Jimmy) Stewart (1883–1960) opened a billiard parlour, barber shop, restaurant, and later, a store. He was postmaster 1920–25, a role commonly performed by a storeowner in such towns. Andrew Stewart (1898–1941), his brother, who assisted in the store, was postmaster 1925–26. James moved and opened a store in Snowshoe. Farmer William Reade (probably c.1876–1944) ran a general store, and was postmaster 1927–31.

Arriving in 1917, T. Francis (Frank) (1881–1951) and Chris (1892–1979) Gleason were pioneers to the area, who had left America to escape the World War I draft. The brothers were prospectors, trappers, and supply agents for fox breeding. During the 1932/33 winter, Chris shot a big timber wolf prowling near the school, one of numerous sightings around the community. Purchased from Stewart in 1927, their general store existed longest. They were fined for exceeding the controlled prices during World War II. After Frank died, Chris operated the store until its sale in 1957. Frank was postmaster 1937–51.

Margaret (?–1953) & Henry (1884–1978) Miller, known for his teams of horses, settled in Dome Creek in the 1910s. In 1919, while Henry was picking blackberries, his uncle rescued him from a vicious bear mauling. A year later, at his trial for burning O.B.U. mail, he was acquitted. In 1922, the family relocated to west of McBride, where they ran a dairy farm. On selling this property to Nance Lumber, he returned to Dome Creek as a logging contractor. He remained a resident until death. Their son James (1914–75) was postmaster 1951–?.

The school opened in 1918, with Malcolm Humphrey Rae as the inaugural teacher. In the early years, some community dances (often farewell functions) were held in the schoolhouse. After the railway construction phase, the population dwindled to 150 (which included 18 farmers) by 1921, and to 100 by 1927, revised to 125 by 1929.

Henry (usually stated as Harry) (1883–1973) & Martha Alice (1886–1965) Robinson homesteaded around 1920. Their children were Nora (c.1910–?), Sheila (c.1911–1995), Montgomery (Montie) (1912–90), Kathleen (1913–82), William (Bill) (1917–96), Myrtle (c.1919–2014), Eileen (1920–92), Patricia (Pat) Ann, Mary M., Lyona (1925–2012), and Iona (1925–82).

In 1931, Sheila married Darrow Casey (1908–84), and they settled in Trail, where Myrtle, Mary, Montie, and Pat would follow. While working in Vancouver, Kathleen met and married Reginald George Clements (1900–83). While based in Prince George, Nora married Fred H. Stephens. Eileen married Harry Willard Webb (1912–74). Initially they lived locally, left briefly, returned briefly, and left permanently. Bill enlisted in 1941, married Jean Margaret Marsden (1916–2015) in England, but the couple settled in Vancouver after his 1945 discharge. Iona enlisted in 1943. Lyona married Floyd Berndt (1922–85) of Giscome, where they lived. Mary, in Trail, married Jack Minton (1913–77). Iona was engaged to John H. Hooper (1919–93), returned to Vancouver for business college, but married Charles Robert Ashworth (1925–82) of Trail, where the couple resided. Pat attended UBC. The Robinson Srs. relocated possibly to Trail about this time.

A. Helmer Westerlund (1889–1979) arrived in 1917. Olga (1902–98) arrived in 1924 and they were married three years later. To complement their farming income, Helmer worked in pole camps, and successfully sued contractor Fred Stevens (1867–1956) for non-payment of wages. Visiting school officials, railway employees, and dignitaries boarded at their house. Daughter Ruth (c.1928–55) attended high school in Prince George, where Olga joined her for a period. Ruth moved away, married Donald Watson in 1952, but died of a blood disease. Sibling Ivan E. attended high school in Prince George, and married Beverley Beecroft in 1956. Acquiring a quarter section, and over time purchasing from his parents and others, their farm increased to six quarters. Relocating to Prince George in 1955, Helmer and Olga ran a boarding house until 1974. In 1979, Ivan's oldest son, Ivan Jr, attended the Jericho Hill School for the Deaf in Vancouver, an institution whose reputation has since been sullied by evidence of rampant sexual abuse. The couple raised four further children at Dome Creek. Three of the children received a quarter, which they farmed on visits from Prince George.

=== Later Community ===
The population of about 50 hovered in the 80s during World War II. During the 1940s, residents often attended the Penny dances, By the 1950s, dances for the whole family occurred monthly in the community hall.

On the closure of the Bend school in 1946, those students transferred. The left-hand section of the present building dates from 1954, with the right-hand wing added two years later to accommodate over 40 pupils. A new three-roomed teacherage opened in 1955. From Grade 9, children either took correspondence courses or boarded at the McBride high school dormitory. Later, Dome Creek only went to Grade 7. Peaking at 38 students, numbers were mainly in the 15–18 range from the mid-1960s to 1980. The average enrolment during the 1980s was 14. By the mid-1980s, operating at 38 percent student capacity, and smaller class sizes, significantly increased costs per student. Unlike its counterparts slated for closure, the school was granted special status until 1991. At the request of the parents, the school added Grade 8 from the 1992/93 year. With only six students, the school closed in 2001. The school bus ride to McBride took 90 minutes each way. Assumedly, the additional passenger load temporarily extended the route closer to Dome Creek, rather than the previous terminus at Walker Creek FSR junction, 15 kilometres (9.3 mi) away.

John E. (1906–87) & Jean (1909–96) Humphreys arrived from Penny in 1957 (1947 a misprint). John, who ran the store 1957–63, owned one of the most complete collections of Canadian coins in Northern BC. While Jean, a registered nurse, became the medical emergency volunteer, John introduced the weekly movie night in the community hall at this time, both services they had provided at Penny. Son James (Jim) R. (1940–2011) & Dianne Humphreys stayed 1969–83. Their children were Howard, Holly, Hunter, and Hilary. John unsuccessfully ran for RDFFG director for area H (Dome Creek-Dunster). They returned in 1993.

During the 1960s, Audrey & Russell (1920–91) Stannard managed a boarding house at Dome Creek. A Mennonite family owned the Creekside Store for a few years, before Jean & G. Alan Fuller Howe operated the store and post-office from 1967 until the store closure in the early 1970s. Son David & Wendy Howe subsequently managed the post office.

The population was 81 in the late 1980s. The Dome Diner operated a 24-hour restaurant during the early 1990s. Closed and boarded up, it stands on Highway 16 at the Dome Creek Road turnoff. Sue's Kitchen existed in the late 1990s, followed by Ma's and Pa's Kitchen.

The Catholic Church, that opened in 1960, but closed after a decade, is now a residential building. A reunion, celebrating the 75th anniversary of the former school, was held August 6–8, 1993.

=== Crime, Calamity & Safety Measures ===
A double drowning occurred near Mile 145 in 1915.

During the spring flood of 1936, when the Fraser reached the underside of the rail bridge, the CNR parked a trainload of rock cars on the bridge as a precaution.

Without a firefighting service, houses burned to the ground. Her husband Alvin (1892–1972) away, Ellen Margaret English (1906–97) was home with her children Douglas (c.1943– ), and Robert (1945– ), and stepchild John E. (Jack) (1932–51), son of former wife Mary Elvena English (1899–1979). The mother and children escaped the blaze unharmed. While logging five years later, a falling tree fatally fractured Jack's skull. His older sibling Clarence (1927–2001) and wife were residents at that time. The Loewen family had a similar winter escape from a house fire.

Locals, Frank Langevin and William Oliver, violently assaulted Stan Hale of Kidd in 1954. Frank’s son Russell (1944–48) died from malnutrition. Another son Patrick Michael (1949–58) died from pneumonia.

In 1961, weather forced a small aircraft returning from a mercy flight to land at Dome Creek. On attempting a take-off, the plane flipped on a snow-filled ditch and sustained extensive damage.

Dana Duane Fowler (1959–67) drowned on a farm.

In the 1967/68 winter, an ice jam in the creek flooded out most of the 60 residents, with only the railway station, the boarding house and a few homes spared. The proprietor temporarily relocated the store to the two-roomed train station. The access road to Highway 16 was submerged. When the Highways Department dynamited the ice, fragments from the explosion crashed through the roof of John Humphrey's house, which was already under four feet of water. The conditions may have been worse than the 1936 spring flood.

In 1997, five people died in a car that lost control on ice and collided with a loaded westbound logging truck on the Highway 16 hill just west of the bridge across Dome Creek.

In 2012, Kohl Anthony Timms, 26, was sentenced to consecutive terms of 14 and 16 months for growing marijuana.

=== Forestry ===
The narrow strip of accessible spruce forest bordering the railway that stretched some 100 miles (160 km) east of Prince George was known as the East Line. The Dome Lumber Co., the first sawmill, dammed the creek and floated logs the 5 miles (8.0 km) down to their mill. In 1912, the Northern Lumber Co. completed building their sawmill, shingle mill and sash-door factory. By 1914, an even larger mill was built by the Upper Fraser Mills Co., with new machinery received the following year.

By 1921, the significant operations were the 30,000-foot capacity Dome Lumber Co. and the 40,000-foot capacity Upper Fraser Lumber Co. (a.k.a. Fraser Timber Syndicate), but the former was subject to winding up orders. That year experienced hot dry weather, with mill workers from the Fraser Timber Syndicate fighting forest fires which threatened the mill. During 1922, neither of the remaining mills operated, possibly unable to secure timber supplies. Using a portable sawmill, James B. Hooker of Bend cut firewood, likely from devastated areas. At the liquidation sale of the Dome Lumber Co. in 1923, both creditors and the government incurred heavy losses, and Bashaw Lumber Co. purchased and moved the assets to east of Dewey (Sinclair Mills) to replace its own mill destroyed by fire the previous September. The Fraser Timber syndicate intended to start milling in spring and the Imperial Lumber Co. planned to build a new mill.

Assistant forest ranger was a seasonal position from spring to fall. By the late 1940s, Standard Forest Products had acquired sawmills at Tête Jaune, Eddy, Dome Creek and Penny. Throughout the 1950s, Lamming Bros. had logging and milling operations in the area.

In the late 1950s, a school bus ran from the Nance Lumber Co.'s new mill. Around 6 miles (9.7 km) to the west, the operation comprised bunkhouses and a cookhouse. The company had operated in McBride since the early 1950s. Based in Red Deer, Alberta, it possessed holdings in McBride and Dome Creek at the time owner William Theodore Nance (c.1908–65) died. Herbert Fichtner (1927–96) owned the small Red Rock Lumber, located within the settlement, during the 1950s–1960s. After purchasing the two mills in the mid-1960s, Northwood soon closed them.

=== Roads ===
A road likely linked the water tower and the community to its west. The government road that existed from the early 1920s did not connect with any roads beyond the Dome Creek area. Since the promised route southeast to McBride would long await a government survey, willing residents were unable to voluntarily construct such a link. The wheat and oat farmers would have benefited from a threshing machine, but it was too large to transport by rail. Within the 46 miles (74 km) gap stretching to 10 miles (16 km) northwest of McBride, 14 miles (23 km) of disconnected roads existed by the late 1930s. No progress occurred either during or immediately following World War II. A federal politician promised a highway by 1958 linking Prince George, McBride and the Alberta border, which like the CNR bridge would cross the Fraser in the vicinity. Maps dated 1931, 1949, and 1956, show a proposed route wholly east of the Fraser bypassing Dome Creek. Instead, the provincial government surveyed a route wholly west of the river for the Fraser-Fort George section of Highway 16, as shown in a 1958 road map, but had constructed only 12 miles (19 km) by 1959.

In 1960, when only 15 vehicles and 14 miles (23 km) of road (of varying quality) existed around Dome Creek, the requirement for vehicles to be licensed and insured was briefly enforced, then relaxed. Vehicles continued to use tax-free dyed fuel. By the 1962/63 winter, work on a highway southeast to McBride included a right-of-way cleared and grubbed to Twin Creek via Crescent Spur. The following November, the McBride and District Chamber of Commerce approached the Highways Department to reinstate the crossing at Mile 50 and put in a winter road to Dome Creek.

With further road-building equipment and supplies brought in by rail, Standard General Construction worked northwest from Dome Creek, and Ginter Construction southeast, in building Highway 16. The 1964 summer was so wet, Ginter was unable to make headway in grading and gravelling the 10-mile (16 km) stretch between Dome Creek and Crescent Spur. A 1967 fire at the Standard General construction camp caused $200,000 of damage. At the time, the community was only accessible by river or rail. By January 1968, the gravel road linking Prince George and McBride was drivable, except during the muddy spring breakup, when sections were impassable. Popular throughout that summer, it was not open to passenger bus operators because the three Bailey bridges were deemed subpar. Between the Willow River and Dome Creek, work was starting on the Willow and Bowron River bridges, and 50 miles (80 km) were paved and 7 miles (11 km) remained as gravel. To the southeast, the West Twin and McBride bridges were nearing completion. The 20.6-mile (33.2 km) Dome Creek-Crescent Spur section would be paved in 1969. Although the unfinished Prince George-McBride sections were expected to be paved that year, work was not completed on the final 50 miles (80 km) until the last of the new bridges opened in mid-1970.

In 1993, the Old Dome Creek access became Bristow Road, and Robertson Road became Robinson Road.

=== Electricity, Broadcast Transmissions & Communications Devices ===
In 1913, a telegraph operator was stationed at the water tower. The separate position appears from 1928, but it is unclear whether the early telegraph office, which preceded the station, possessed automatic printing apparatus, or the pumpman performed double duty.

By 1930, radio listeners enjoyed clear reception. For enthusiasts wishing to receive messages from ships at sea or isolated ports, Prof. W. Reade was offering courses in telegraphy.

From 1929, the CNR telephone lines opened for public usage, linking Dome Creek with Prince George, but were not connected with the outside telephone network until 1931. McBride had to wait until 1955, when North-West Telephone Company leased a special circuit from the CNR which connected with Dome Creek. By 1967, only one active telephone remained in Dome Creek, which was in the general store, after the Red Rock Lumber one was disconnected on closedown. Most locals had used the office phone at the mill for making calls. In 1992, the referendum for a telephone service, financed by an additional $175 in property tax each year, was approved. The following year, the RDFFG installed the system.

In 1984, the referendum for an electricity supply, at a cost of $214,100 for the community after government subsidies, amortized to property taxes over 20 years, was approved. The next year, BC Hydro constructed an electrical distribution line to the community. Since road frontage determined the individual property tax burden, the recovery methodology penalized non-subdividable farms, some of which with their own generators have not connected to the system. Equally, the up front $10,000 grant for each hookup encouraged unnecessary connections that customers had no intention of maintaining.

Completed in 2014, the Telus cell tower near Dome Creek also serves over 16 kilometres (9.9 mi) of Highway 16 between west of Penny and Dome Mountain.

=== Climate ===
Climate data for Dome Creek
Month	Jan	Feb	Mar	Apr	May	Jun	Jul	Aug	Sep	Oct	Nov	Dec	Year
Record high °C (°F)	11.1 (52.0)	14 (57)	20 (68)	28.3 (82.9)	34.5 (94.1)	33 (91)	34 (93)	35 (95)	32 (90)	25.5 (77.9)	15.5 (59.9)	9.5 (49.1)	35 (95)
Mean daily maximum °C (°F)	−4.5 (23.9)	−0.4 (31.3)	5.2 (41.4)	11.6 (52.9)	16.8 (62.2)	19.4 (66.9)	22.4 (72.3)	22.1 (71.8)	16.1 (61.0)	9.7 (49.5)	1.1 (34.0)	−3.7 (25.3)	9.6 (49.3)
Daily mean °C (°F)	−9.5 (14.9)	−5.8 (21.6)	−0.8 (30.6)	4.4 (39.9)	9.2 (48.6)	12.5 (54.5)	14.7 (58.5)	14.4 (57.9)	9.8 (49.6)	4.4 (39.9)	−2.7 (27.1)	−8 (18)	3.6 (38.5)
Mean daily minimum °C (°F)	−14.3 (6.3)	−11.2 (11.8)	−6.9 (19.6)	−2.9 (26.8)	1.5 (34.7)	5.5 (41.9)	7.1 (44.8)	6.7 (44.1)	3.4 (38.1)	−0.9 (30.4)	−6.5 (20.3)	−12.3 (9.9)	−2.6 (27.3)
Record low °C (°F)	−46.1 (−51.0)	−40 (−40)	−36.7 (−34.1)	−19 (−2)	−10 (14)	−4 (25)	−1 (30)	−6.5 (20.3)	−8 (18)	−21 (−6)	−38.5 (−37.3)	−47 (−53)	−47 (−53)
Average precipitation mm (inches)	84.2 (3.31)	55.4 (2.18)	44.7 (1.76)	41.5 (1.63)	53.9 (2.12)	90.9 (3.58)	76.8 (3.02)	73.2 (2.88)	79 (3.1)	74.4 (2.93)	73 (2.9)	95 (3.7)	841.8 (33.14)
Source: 1971-2000 Environment Canada
