= Dunster, British Columbia =

- Community
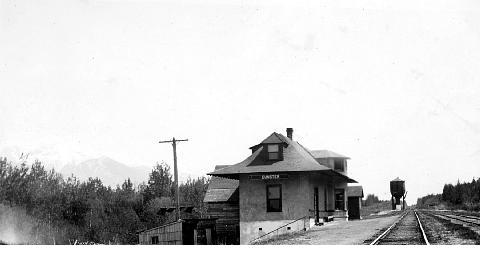
- GTP Station at Dunster (1920s)

- Location of Dunster in British Columbia
- Coordinates: 53°07′27″N 119°50′16″W
- Country: Canada
- Province: British Columbia
- Regional District: Fraser-Fort George
- Time zone: UTC−07:00 (PT)
- Postal code: V0J
- Area codes: 250, 778

Dunster is a small farming community in the Robson Valley region of British Columbia, Canada. It is located 31 km east of McBride and 37 km west of Tête Jaune Cache, and 10 km north of Croydon. Dunster is home to one of the few remaining, original and least altered Grand Trunk Pacific Railway stations.

== History ==
Dunster was named after Dunster, England. Railroad manager, H.P. Hinton chose the name from a list provided to him by Josiah Wedgwood. The station was constructed in 1913. The Dunster Post Office was opened 1 December 1915 with George Hall as the first postmaster. In 1921 Mrs A. McDonald became postmaster.

== Climate ==
Climate data for Dunster, British Columbia
Month	Jan	Feb	Mar	Apr	May	Jun	Jul	Aug	Sep	Oct	Nov	Dec	Year
Record high °C (°F)	8 (46)	11.5 (52.7)	19 (66)	27.2 (81.0)	35 (95)	33.5 (92.3)	34.5 (94.1)	35 (95)	33 (91)	25 (77)	16.1 (61.0)	11 (52)	35 (95)
Mean daily maximum °C (°F)	−3.9 (25.0)	−0.1 (31.8)	6.1 (43.0)	12.5 (54.5)	17.4 (63.3)	20.5 (68.9)	23.2 (73.8)	22.4 (72.3)	17 (63)	10 (50)	1 (34)	−4 (25)	10.2 (50.4)
Daily mean °C (°F)	−7.7 (18.1)	−4.6 (23.7)	0.5 (32.9)	5.7 (42.3)	10.1 (50.2)	13.2 (55.8)	15.4 (59.7)	14.8 (58.6)	10.5 (50.9)	5.2 (41.4)	−2.3 (27.9)	−7.4 (18.7)	4.5 (40.1)
Mean daily minimum °C (°F)	−11.6 (11.1)	−9 (16)	−5.1 (22.8)	−1.1 (30.0)	2.8 (37.0)	6 (43)	7.5 (45.5)	7.1 (44.8)	4 (39)	0.4 (32.7)	−5.6 (21.9)	−10.8 (12.6)	−1.3 (29.7)
Record low °C (°F)	−42 (−44)	−45.5 (−49.9)	−36 (−33)	−16.7 (1.9)	−5 (23)	−3 (27)	−0.5 (31.1)	−5 (23)	−7.5 (18.5)	−27 (−17)	−39 (−38)	−45 (−49)	−45.5 (−49.9)
Average precipitation mm (inches)	55.9 (2.20)	41.3 (1.63)	39.1 (1.54)	31.9 (1.26)	43.4 (1.71)	60.6 (2.39)	59.6 (2.35)	55.5 (2.19)	50.5 (1.99)	64.9 (2.56)	61.1 (2.41)	67.1 (2.64)	630.7 (24.83)
Source: 1971-2000 Environment Canada

== See also ==
- Dunster Fine Arts School
- Dunster CN railway station
