= Loos, British Columbia =

Loos
- Location of Loos in British Columbia
- Coordinates: 53°36′00″N 120°42′00″W
- Country: Canada
- Province: British Columbia
- Area codes: 250, 778

Loos is a locality on the Canadian National Railway west of McBride, British Columbia, immediately next to Crescent Spur and the confluence of the Morkill River with the Fraser River. Loos Post Office opened 30 March 1916, named in recognition of the Battle of Loos of World War I. The first postmaster was Mrs. A Martin. The post office closed 11 July 1951, after most of the residents had moved to Crescent Spur. The Grand Trunk Pacific Railway station here was renamed from "Crescent Island" to Loos later in 1916. The community experienced flooding in 1936.

Via Rail's Jasper – Prince Rupert train calls at the Loos railway station.

The original settlers were Ole Olson Leboe, originally of Vagland, Norway, and his wife Anna Maria. Around 1917 their sons built the Leboe Lumber Company sawmill here on the banks of the Fraser River. It was destroyed by fire, and rebuilt several times.
