= Kidd (railway point), British Columbia =

Kidd, British Columbia
- Railway Point
- Location of Kidd in British Columbia
- Coordinates: 53°43′00″N 120°58′00″W
- Country: Canada
- Province: British Columbia
- Land District: Cariboo
- Regional District: Fraser-Fort George
- Geographic Region: Robson Valley
- Elevation: 648 m (2,126 ft)
- Area codes: 250, 778, 236, & 672

Kidd, a former settlement a.k.a. Kidd Station, existed 3.7 miles (6.0 km) southeast of Dome Creek in central British Columbia. The flag stop both predated and outlived its namesake 12.5 miles (20.1 km) west of Chilliwack on the BCER.

== History ==
=== Railway ===
Kidd, like Bend to its northwest, and Urling to its southeast, was an original train station (1914) on the Grand Trunk Pacific Railway (the Canadian National Railway after nationalization). Kidd lies at Mile 51.9, Fraser Subdivision (about Mile 141 during the line's construction).

By August 1913, the railway track had been laid from Mile 53 (Tête Jaune) to Mile 138, and then Mile 142. Dome Creek has historically described both a specific place and the general area several miles on either side, such as Mile 141, or Mile 142. The area may have comprised 2,000 workers housed in construction camps stretching from Mile 141 to 146. The Railway Commission having handed over control to operate this section, the first GTP passenger arrived at Mile 141 that month.

O.E. Hood & Co., which ran stores at the Mile 53 (Tête Jaune), Mile 79 and Mile 142 camps, was erecting a modern building in Fort George.

In 1962, a five-car derailment occurred at Mile 49. Months later, a mechanical defect derailed 19 cars near the middle of a 120-car freight train between Kidd and Urling. The westbound passenger train was delayed about six hours.

Built in 1914, the standard-design Plan 100‐152 (Bohi’s Type E) station building was demolished in 1953, and replaced by a GTP era freight shed conversion, which was in turn removed before the 2000s.

Service	1914–c.1919	c.1920–c.1921	c.1921–1931	1932–c.1939	c.1940–c.1948	c.1949–1968	1968–1977	1977–c.1989
Passenger	Regular stop	Flag stop	Flag stop		Flag stop	Flag stop		Flag stop
Way freight	Flag stop probably	Flag stop probably	Regular stop	Flag stop	Regular stop	Flag stop	Flag stop	

Siding	Mile No. *	1922	1933	1943	1960–72	1977–92
(Capacity Length)		Cars	Cars	Cars	Cars	Feet
Kidd	51.9	67	66			2,490
Kidd	52.0			58	53	

- Assumedly, a remeasurement confirmed the siding switch was closer to Mile 51.9

Other Tracks	Mile No.	1943	1960
(Capacity Length)		Cars	Cars
Leboe Lumber Co.	50.6		8
H.B. Thrasher	52.0	3	

=== Forestry ===
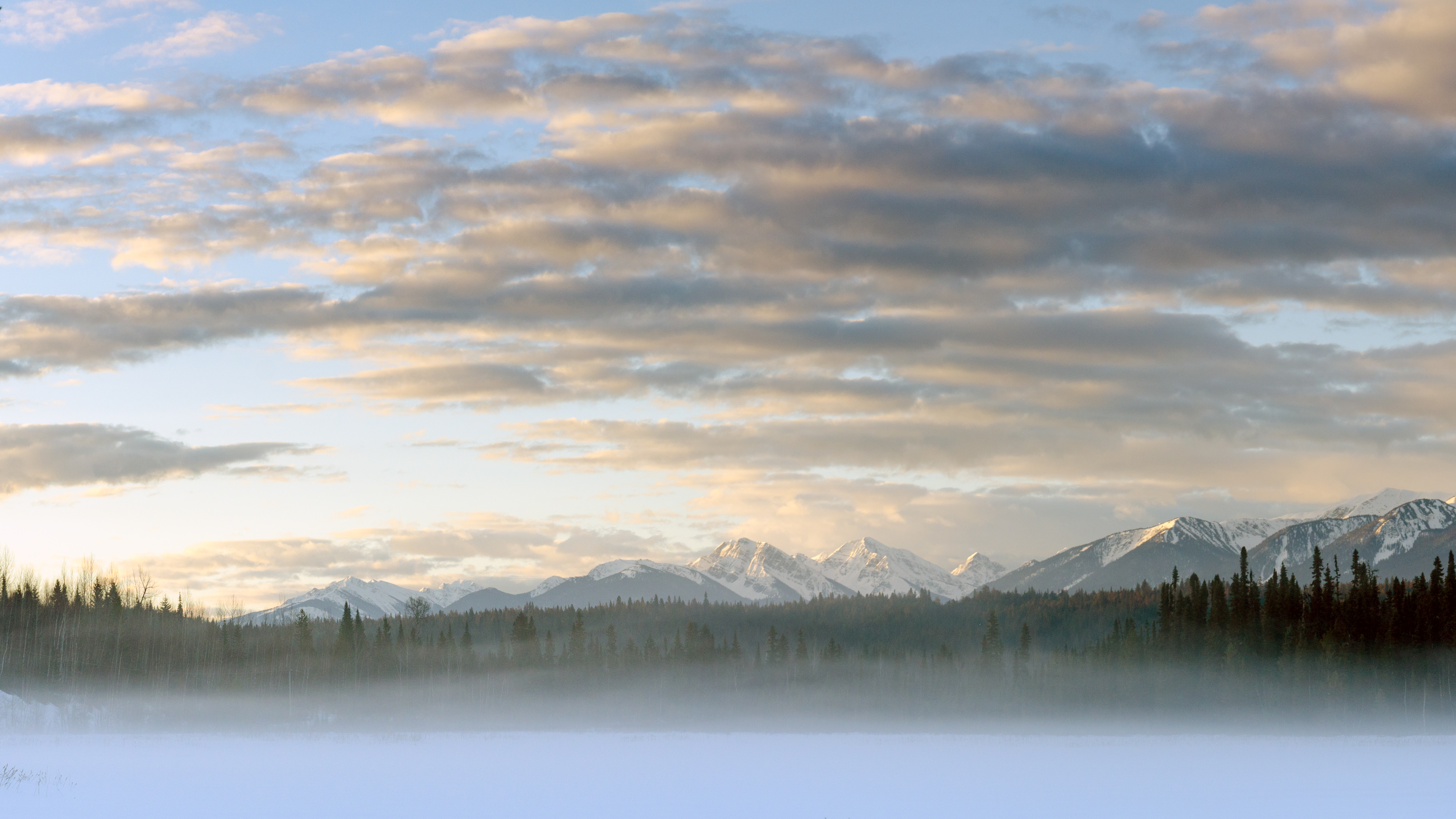
Nameless lake on the eastern Kidd road by the Hunter's homestead

The narrow strip of accessible spruce forest bordering the railway that stretched some 100 miles (160 km) east of Prince George was known as the East Line. In 1918, the Upper Fraser Lumber Co. of Dome Creek had a logging camp at Kidd. Frederick (Fred) Thrasher (1890–1967) (Thresher alternate spelling) logged and operated a sawmill during the 1940s. A falling tree fatally crushed logger Walford Swanson (1886–1947). When the sawmill burned to the ground in 1949, the nearby planer mill and finished lumber were spared.

It is unclear whether Ptarmigan Lumber, which operated during the 1950s, rebuilt the former mill. Mel McKenzie, the manager, badly fractured an ankle when his speeder jumped the track. Wilf Leboe (1919–2010) operated Leboe Lumber a mile to the east by the river, which he sold to Jim Chambers (1924–?) from Penny, but it closed by the late 1950s. During the 1970s, Glen Hooker from Bend ran a portable mill on his property at Kidd.

=== Community ===
White and Stewart may have operated a restaurant in the latter 1910s, but this could be a confusion with the one run by James Stewart at Dome Creek, likely around Mile 54. The school at Mile 48 operated from the late 1920s to at least the mid-1930s. Teachers included Marjorie Giles, P. Haslam (probably Pearl), Elsie Eccles, and Nancy Sanders. The population was 29 in 1929.

The following were pioneer farmers. James W. (c.1876–?) & Annie (1877–1949) Cattle, and her son, William (Bill) Haws (1904–69), resided on Lot 3281 1910s to late 1920s. Mary Josephine (Josie) Weaver (1912–99), a local section hand's daughter, married Bill, and the family later lived at Hutton and Hansard. Jacob Schiesser (c.1891–?), who resided on Lot 3280 1910s to the 1960s, married Jean Blommaert. The family advertised the farm for sale in 1963. Thea (Tillie) Saunders (1888–1973) resided mid-1920s to mid-1930s.

Early farmer/trappers included F. Martin (Deafy) Dayton (1886–1940), George Logan (1873–1950) on Lot 3281 1915–50, Peter Loftstrom throughout the 1920s, and the Jensen brothers.

In an environment with limited eligible females, Martin Dayton's attempts to find a bride appear unsuccessful. This may have influenced a temporary move to Aleza Lake in the early 1920s, before returning in 1928. He was a larger than life trapper, and key organizer for the trappers' dance held annually in Prince George. He pressed charges against unscrupulous trappers who looted his possessions and prey. When not trapping, he grew strawberries, but had moved to Bend by the late 1930s.

Although Einer W. Jensen (1888–1952), arrived during the 1910s, he appears to have lived closer to Dome Creek from the late 1920s. Ernest H. Jensen (1890–1966), the first brother to arrive in the area, was a hunter, who sold the meat to the railway construction camps. He initially lived on Lot 5969, closer to Urling, but he was at Kidd from the late 1920s to the late 1940s, before returning to Urling. In 1960, when an amphibian plane clipped a suspended cable while landing on the Fraser, the occupants paddled their wrecked plane to shore. After walking 1.5 miles to Ernest's cabin, he transported them the 10 miles downstream by boat to Dome Creek. Arne Jensen (1898–1972) predominantly lived at Kidd from about 1920 to 1950. During the 1966 CNR strike, Arne took Susan Hale and her mother upstream on a four-hour boat trip to Crescent Spur, where his passengers completed the remaining 35 miles (56 km) by truck, so that Susan could reach McBride for the beginning of school term. It is unclear precisely where Arne spent his latter years in the Dome Creek area.

Leslie (1888–1972) & Mary Isabel (c.1893–1960) Hale settled on their preemption at Mile 48 in the late 1920s. Leslie farmed and pursued a career as a forest ranger. Their children were Stanley (Stan) (c.1914–?), Cecil Edgar (Ed) (1915–2001), Vivien A. (1918–2014), Leslie Wilson (c.1919–1985), and John Kenneth (Bud) (1923–1999). The older ones formed part of the Dome Creek social circle. Vivien married Robert T. Blackwood (c.1914–c.1950), and the newlyweds settled in Dunster, but Robert did erect a sawmill in the Dome Creek area. When Stan married Margaret Lonsdale (c.1918–?), they settled in Snowshoe, but divorced in 1945. In 1940, L. Wilson married Dorothy G. Bown (1920–2000) and they lived in Prince George.

The four brothers and Robert Blackwood enlisted during World War II. Dorothy stayed locally, though she also spent time with her parents. Vivien and her children resided with her own parents, but the family relocated to Prince George after the war. The brothers, having resettled in the Dome Creek area, children followed for Stan and L. Wilson Hale. Ed married June Robson (1928–68), who would die of metastatic cancer. Bud married Mildred Edith Brine (1930–1993), but the couple were not residents. By that time, the Hale seniors had relocated to Prince George and Wilson's family to Finmoore. Settled in the Dome Creek area, Ed and June had only one child, Susan. After June's death, Ed remained in the locality.

Charles Robert (1875–1960) & Alta (c.1885–1945) Blangy arrived in 1928. Initially logging, he became a farmer and remained on retirement. Their children were James (1911–70), Robert (1913–75), Henry, Raymond (1926–83), and Ernest H. (1930–97). James farmed in the area from the early 1930s until retirement. He married Florence Eva Francis (1918–2009). Their children were Evert (1942– ), Lloyd (1944– ), and Allen (1947–2014). The three children of Lloyd & Christina (Chris) and the three children of Allen & Patricia (Patty) were the only pupils when the Dome Creek school closed. Robert farmed at Kidd until the mid-1930s, before focussing upon crime locally and beyond. Ernest pursued a similar lifestyle further afield. Henry had relocated by the time he suffered crushed fingers in a mill accident. Raymond married Violet Hedman (1920–71) at Aleza Lake, and the couple settled elsewhere.

=== Crime, Calamity & Safety Measures ===
During the 1925/26 winter, W. Allan Goodson (c.1870–c.1926), who worked traplines in the wilderness from Prince George along the Robson Valley, went missing. Emmet Baxter (Shorty) Haynes (?–1953) guided the initial police search to the subject's cabin, which was in an area 17 miles (27 km) upstream from Dome Creek (probably closer to Urling) on the Fraser. Comments Goodson had previously made to James Stewart at Dome Creek, and notes in his cabin, indicated that Haynes had threatened his life. Further searches revealed no traces of a body and it remains a cold case. Five years later, when Haynes was two weeks overdue in checking in at the Dome Creek post-office, concerns arose as to the popular trapper's wellbeing.

By 1914, Haynes, was described as a well-known old-timer, who was over six-foot tall. Research by novelist Jack Boudreau of Penny indicated that Goodson was suspected of stealing from others' traplines. Apparently, Haynes and Goodson had been feuding for years. At a secretive meeting of trappers at Dome Creek, Haynes volunteered to deal with the matter, but because of his popularity, nobody snitched on him. In 1928, while riding in the vicinity, Haynes shattered his leg when his horse stumbled and fell upon him. On his death, Haynes, who served in World War I, had worked in many central B.C. locations.

Robert Blangy accumulated a record for theft, escape from custody, imprisonment, impaired driving and fines. His sibling Ernest amassed convictions for forgery, assault, public intoxication, possession of stolen goods, theft, and impaired driving, without a licence, insurance or due care. Alcoholism was the cause of most of his indictable offences.

For opening an exit and leaping from a westbound train between Snowshoe and Kidd in 1943, Joseph Gouchier, of Penny, received a three-month suspended sentence.

In 1948, Harvey Paulson, Gordon Whelan and William Oleksiewich received paid train tickets from Edmonton to Kidd, and board and supplies, but refused to commence work. They were each fined $25 and ordered to make restitution to the defrauded sawmill.

=== Roads ===
Early settlers used the railway line as a trail to Dome Creek destinations. The government road, which existed from the early 1920s, follows a circuitous route. No road connections existed outside of the area. The respective Dome Creek section covers the Mile 50 crossing and later roadbuilding. In 1993, the Dome Creek-Kidd Road was renamed the Dome Creek Road.

=== Electricity, Broadcast Transmissions & Communications Devices ===
The respective Dome Creek section covers these networks.
