= Prince George station =

Railway station in British Columbia, Canada

Prince George
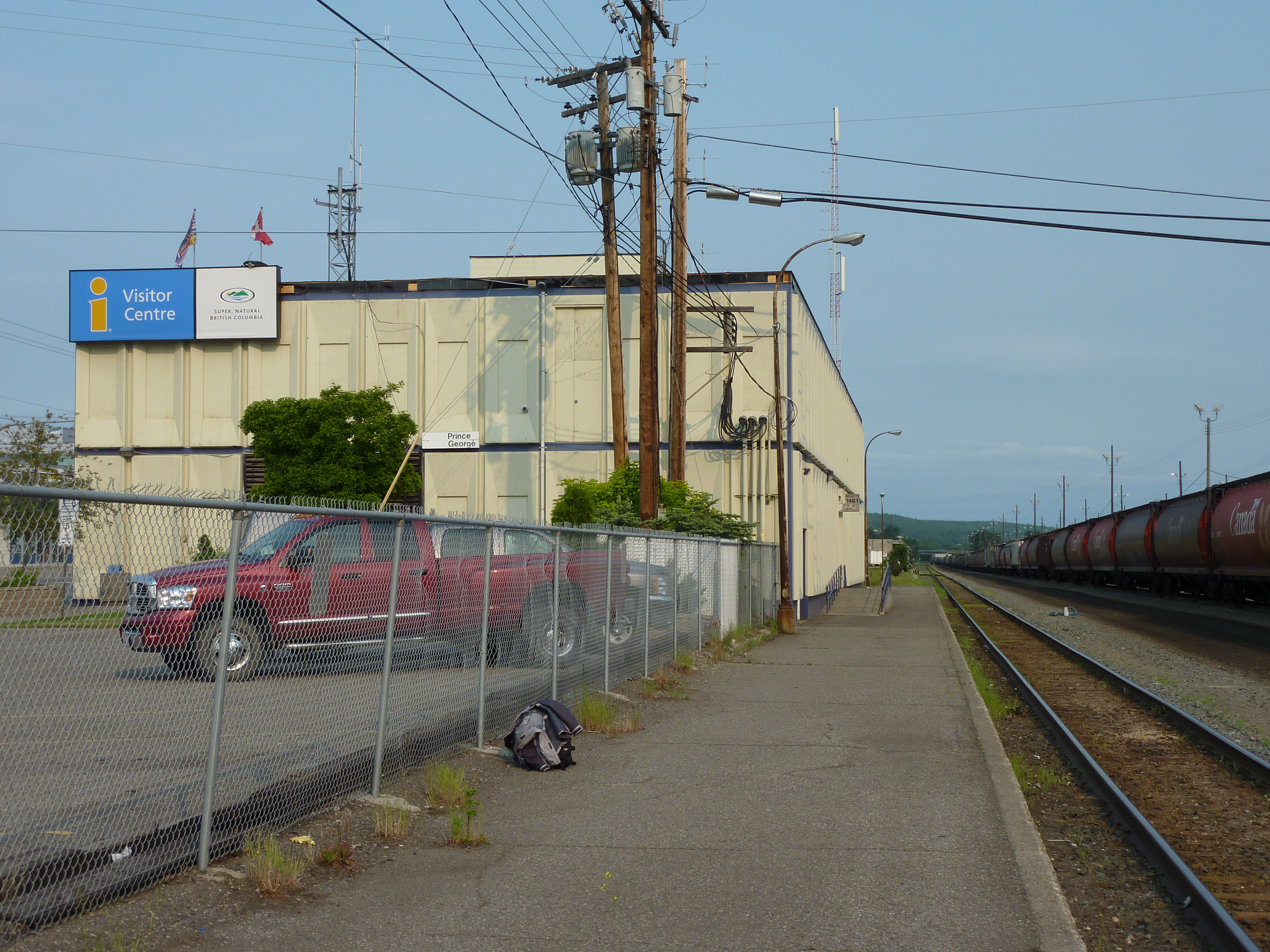

General information
- Location: 1300 1st Ave. Prince George, BC; V2L 2Y3, Canada
- Coordinates: 53.9192°N 122.7442°W
- Line: Jasper–Prince Rupert train
- Platforms: 1
- Connections: Prince George Transit

Construction
- Platform levels: 1
- Parking: short term (1/2 hour)
- Accessible: yes

Other information
- Status: Staffed station
- Station code: VIA Rail: PGEO; IATA: XDV

History
- Opened: 1922
- Original company: Grand Trunk Pacific Railway

Services
Preceding station	Via Rail	Following station
Vanderhoof toward Prince Rupert	Jasper–Prince Rupert	Willow River toward Jasper

Former services
Preceding station	Canadian National Railway	Following station
Otway toward Prince Rupert	Prince Rupert – Jasper	Foreman toward Jasper
At former BC Rail station
Preceding station	BC Rail	Following station
Strathnaver toward North Vancouver	Main line	Terminus
Hixon toward North Vancouver	Cariboo Prospector (limited service)	Terminus
Location
- Location within British Columbia Location within Canada

Prince George station is a railway station in Prince George, British Columbia. It is on the Canadian National Railway mainline. Via Rail's Jasper–Prince Rupert train service overnights at this station between Prince Rupert and Jasper.
