= McBride, British Columbia =

McBride
- Village
- The Corporation of the Village of McBride
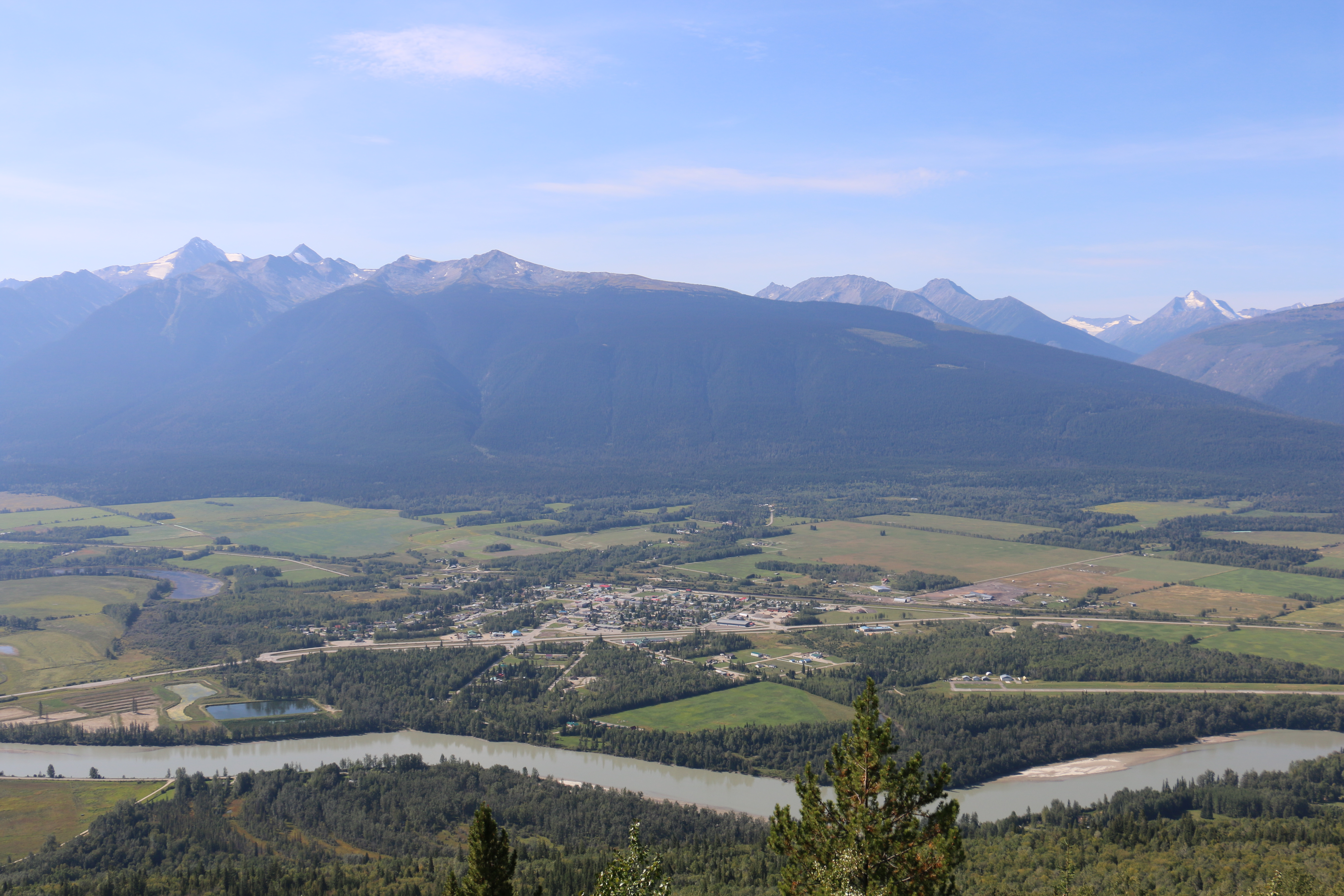
- McBride and the Fraser River
- Logo
- Motto: "A Town on Track"
- Location of the Village of McBridein McBride (Canada)
- Coordinates: 53°18′15″N 120°09′41″W
- Country: Canada
- Province: British Columbia
- Regional District: Fraser-Fort George
- Established: 1913
- Incorporated: April 1932

Government
  - Mayor: Eugene Runtz

Area
  - Total: 4.64 km^{2} (1.79 sq mi)

Population (2016)
  - Total: 616
  - Density: 133/km^{2} (344/sq mi)
- Time zone: UTC−07:00 (PT)
- Area code: 250 / 778 / 236
- Highways: Highway 16 (TCH) Trans-Canada Highway
- Website: www.mcbride.ca

McBride is a village in the Robson Valley region of British Columbia, Canada. The village is located 210 km (130 mi) southeast of Prince George, British Columbia, and 166 km (103 mi) west of Jasper, Alberta. Incorporated in 1932, McBride is located in the Robson Valley surrounded by the Rocky Mountains and Cariboo Ranges.

== History ==
McBride was founded in 1913 as Mile 90 of the Grand Trunk Pacific Railway. The village was named after the serving premier, Sir Richard McBride.

McBride's early industries were rail, shipping, forest harvesting and the agricultural development of the valley. In 1970 access to McBride changed with the opening of Highway 16 (Yellowhead), which enabled vehicles to travel through the valley. McBride is rich in farmland in the valley bottom, with a mix of forest and alpine surrounding the valley. This unique mixture allows McBride to be a prime location for many industries. Current industries for McBride are railroad, forestry, tourism, small businesses and agriculture. Barley, oats, forage crops and pasture are the main agricultural activities supported by dark gray Doré clay loam to clay and gray Rausch clay.

== Demographics ==
In the 2021 Census of Population conducted by Statistics Canada, McBride had a population of 588 living in 266 of its 325 total private dwellings, a change of −4.5% from its 2016 population of 616. With a land area of 4.62 km^{2} (1.78 sq mi), it had a population density of 127.3/km^{2} (329.6/sq mi) in 2021.

== Economy ==
McBride Community Forest Corporation (MCFC) is a corporation that is owned by the Village of McBride. MCFC was set up in 2002 to manage community forest tenure for the village and the surrounding area. The Community Forest license grants the village exclusive rights to harvest Crown timber from approximately 60,000 hectares of land. MCFC is able to serve the social, economic and environment needs for McBride's forest industry. MCFC manages "the forest for all of its product potential rather than just timber."

== Healthcare ==
McBride Hospital and Health Centre provides a variety of services to the community and surrounding area. The hospital is equipped with an emergency room, three acute care beds and eight long-term beds. The hospital is also provides x-ray and lab services. Acupuncture and massage therapy is accessible to residents in this region. A BC ambulance station is located in McBride beside the hospital, with 911 services being available to McBride and the surrounding areas.

== Attractions ==
The village offers diverse outdoor attractions for all seasons. During the winter months, McBride has a variety of cross-country skiing trails and its world-famous snowmobiling trails and designated snowmobiling areas, as well as offering numerous locations for the ever-popular ice fishing. The warmer months in McBride allow for hiking, camping, fishing and bird watching. Recreation sites in the area include Beaver Falls Recreation Trail, Beaver River Recreation Site, LaSalle Lake Recreation Site and McBride Peak Halfway Hut. Another popular site is Horseshoe Lake, a naturally formed ox-bow lake that allows birdwatchers to observe waterfowl and other birds from an observation platform. The village has a ball field and Community Recreation Centre that is equipped with gym, a regulation sized ice hockey arena, two curling sheets and a convertible court.

The McBride and District Public Library and the Valley Museum and Archives are housed in a building on Main Street. A popular attraction among tourists, the Valley Museum and Archives presents a variety of touring exhibitions each year showcasing the unique history and culture of the Robson Valley. The library offers a variety of services to the community and tourists, including workshops for all ages, internet access and computer stations, and a wide selection of media.

The Robson Valley Community Centre in McBride has a stage, dance floor and commercial kitchen. The Robson Valley Community Centre is available to rent for theatre performances, conferences, wedding receptions, tradeshows or a family reunion.

== Transportation ==
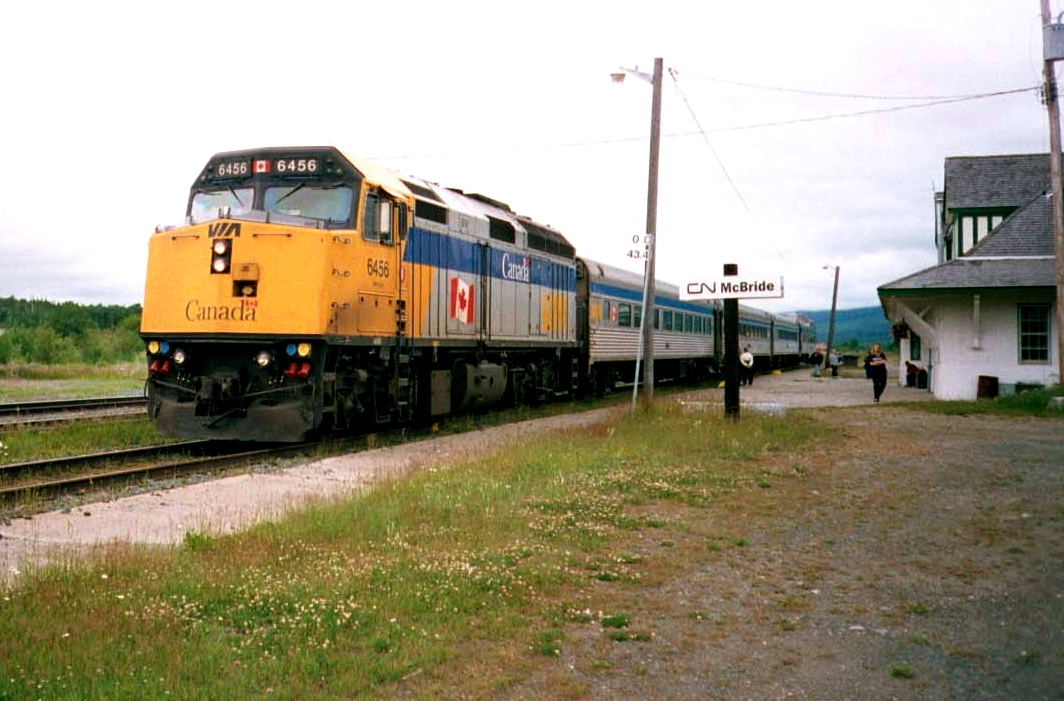
Train station, McBride, 2019.

McBride is served by passenger railway, the Jasper-Prince Rupert train operated by Via Rail and serves McBride station. Via Rail connects McBride with Prince George and Prince Rupert as well as Jasper eastwards three times a week.

== Community ==
The population of McBride was 616 at the 2016 Census. The population including the surrounding area is 1,586. Main Street has a variety of unique stores for visitors and locals to come and explore. The focal point of Main Street is the McBride station. The Grand Trunk Pacific Railway built the train station in 1913. A fire burnt the building down in 1918. The station was quickly rebuilt and reopened in 1919 on the original site. The last train dispatched from this station in 1989, but trains still ride through the station and pick up passengers on a daily basis. In 1996, the Village of McBride bought the station. The station houses the Whistle Stop, a gallery of quality work done by local artists and crafters, as well as McBride's Visitor Information Centre and a locally owned coffee shop The Beanery.

== Climate ==
McBride is relatively wet, especially in the summer. Precipitation occurs 21 days on average during the month of July. Only nearby Crescent Spur gets more rain days in July in all of Canada.

Climate data for McBride
Month	Jan	Feb	Mar	Apr	May	Jun	Jul	Aug	Sep	Oct	Nov	Dec	Year
Record high °C (°F)	10.5 (50.9)	12.5 (54.5)	19.5 (67.1)	27.0 (80.6)	33.0 (91.4)	33.5 (92.3)	34.5 (94.1)	33.5 (92.3)	30.5 (86.9)	24.5 (76.1)	15.0 (59.0)	7.5 (45.5)	34.5 (94.1)
Mean daily maximum °C (°F)	−2.6 (27.3)	1.4 (34.5)	5.9 (42.6)	12.8 (55.0)	17.6 (63.7)	20.7 (69.3)	22.3 (72.1)	22.1 (71.8)	17.1 (62.8)	9.6 (49.3)	2.2 (36.0)	−1.8 (28.8)	10.6 (51.1)
Daily mean °C (°F)	−6.7 (19.9)	−3.2 (26.2)	0.6 (33.1)	5.7 (42.3)	10.1 (50.2)	13.5 (56.3)	15.2 (59.4)	14.6 (58.3)	10.6 (51.1)	4.9 (40.8)	−1.1 (30.0)	−5.0 (23.0)	4.9 (40.8)
Mean daily minimum °C (°F)	−10.7 (12.7)	−7.8 (18.0)	−4.8 (23.4)	−1.4 (29.5)	2.5 (36.5)	6.1 (43.0)	8.1 (46.6)	7.1 (44.8)	4.0 (39.2)	0.2 (32.4)	−4.3 (24.3)	−8.2 (17.2)	−0.8 (30.6)
Record low °C (°F)	−40.0 (−40.0)	−31.0 (−23.8)	−31.0 (−23.8)	−15.5 (4.1)	−5.5 (22.1)	−1.5 (29.3)	0.0 (32.0)	−0.5 (31.1)	−6.0 (21.2)	−13.0 (8.6)	−31.5 (−24.7)	−38.0 (−36.4)	−40.0 (−40.0)
Average precipitation mm (inches)	53.4 (2.10)	27.1 (1.07)	44.2 (1.74)	39.9 (1.57)	52.1 (2.05)	73.7 (2.90)	101.8 (4.01)	68.7 (2.70)	73.9 (2.91)	72.8 (2.87)	53.5 (2.11)	42.1 (1.66)	703 (27.7)
Average rainfall mm (inches)	10.4 (0.41)	6.3 (0.25)	21.8 (0.86)	30.9 (1.22)	50.3 (1.98)	73.7 (2.90)	101.8 (4.01)	68.7 (2.70)	73.9 (2.91)	67.1 (2.64)	21.7 (0.85)	6.2 (0.24)	532.6 (20.97)
Average snowfall cm (inches)	43.0 (16.9)	20.8 (8.2)	22.4 (8.8)	9.0 (3.5)	1.8 (0.7)	0.0 (0.0)	0.0 (0.0)	0.0 (0.0)	0.0 (0.0)	5.7 (2.2)	31.8 (12.5)	35.9 (14.1)	170.4 (67.1)
Average precipitation days (≥ 0.2 mm)	10.9	7.8	12.1	12.7	16.9	19.2	21.1	16.1	17.3	18.6	13.8	10.4	176.8
Mean monthly sunshine hours	51.2	85.5	136.7	179.5	222.7	203.9	215.5	208.3	175.8	89.9	45.7	39.5	1,654.3
Percentage possible sunshine	20.4	30.9	37.2	42.8	45.3	40.2	42.3	45.4	46.0	27.3	17.6	16.8	34.3
Source: Environment Canada

== Notable people ==
- Rod Monroe, member of the Oregon Senate
- Tanner Molendyk, Canadian junior ice hockey player
