= Prince Rupert station =

Railway station in British Columbia, Canada

Prince Rupert
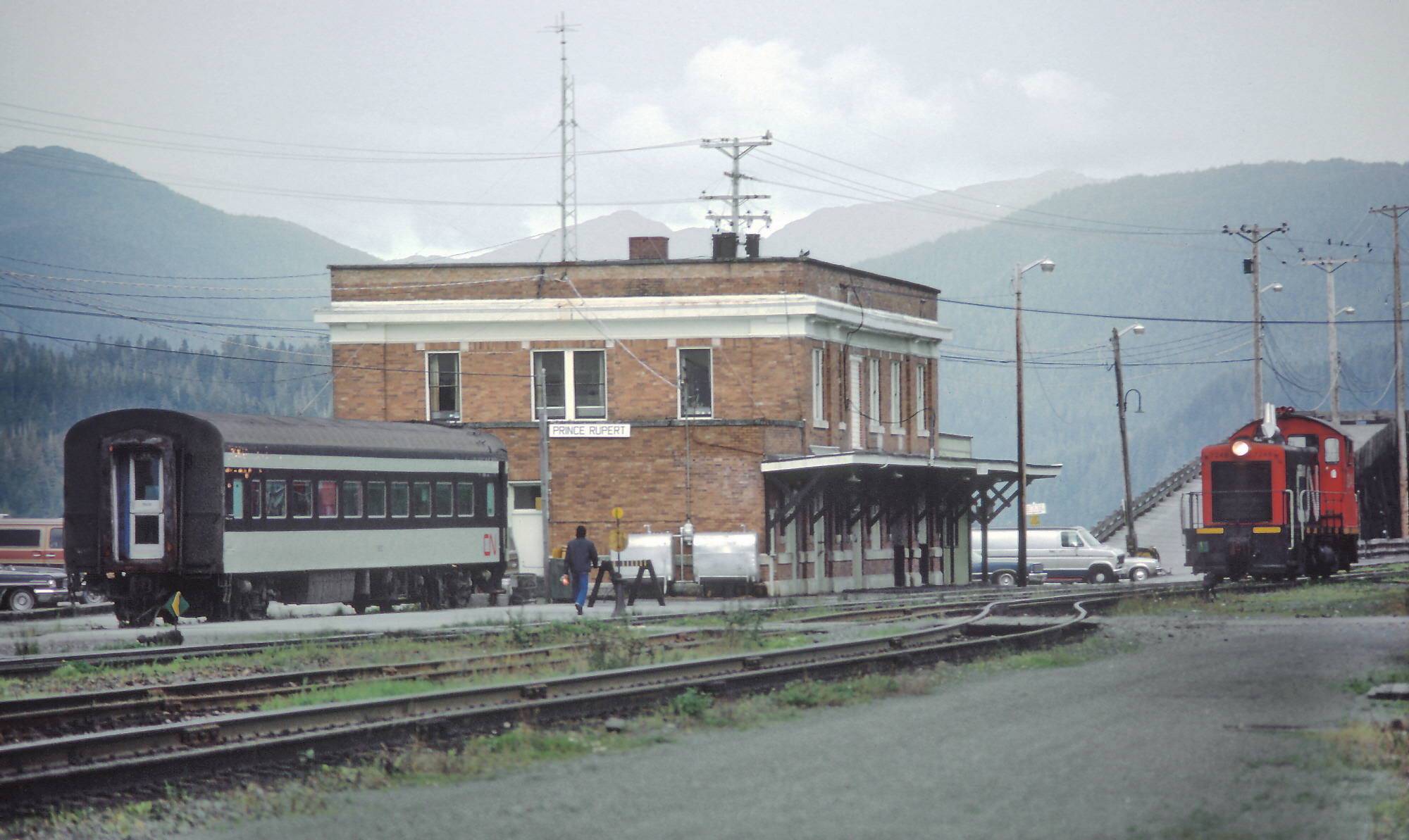
- The CN Prince Rupert yard in October 1979.

General information
- Location: 2000 Park Ave., Prince Rupert, BC; Canada
- Coordinates: 54°17′45″N 130°21′07″W
- Connections: Prince Rupert Ferry Terminal; BC Ferries; Alaska Marine Highway

Construction
- Structure type: Unstaffed station
- Accessible: yes
- Architectural style: Modern Classical

Other information
- Station code: VIA Rail: PRUP
- IATA code: XDW
- Website: Prince Rupert train station

Services
Preceding station	Via Rail	Following station
Terminus	Jasper–Prince Rupert	Cassiar Cannery toward Jasper

Former services
Preceding station	Canadian National Railway	Following station
Terminus	Prince Rupert – Jasper	Kaien toward Jasper

Heritage Railway Station (Canada)
- Official name: Prince Rupert Canadian National Railways Station
- Designated: 1992
- Reference no.: 6759
Location
- Location within British Columbia Location within Canada

The Prince Rupert station is on the Canadian National Railway mainline in Prince Rupert, British Columbia. The station is the western terminus for the Via Rail's Jasper–Prince Rupert train.

The station building was designed by the CNR Architectural Division in Winnipeg and constructed between 1921 and 1922 in a Modern Classical style adjacent to the waterfront. It became a federally designated Heritage Railway Station in 1992. Services include car rental, telephones, vending machines and washrooms.

Freight capacity at Prince Rupert was upgraded in 2024.
