= Jasper station =

Railway station in Jasper, Canada

Jasper
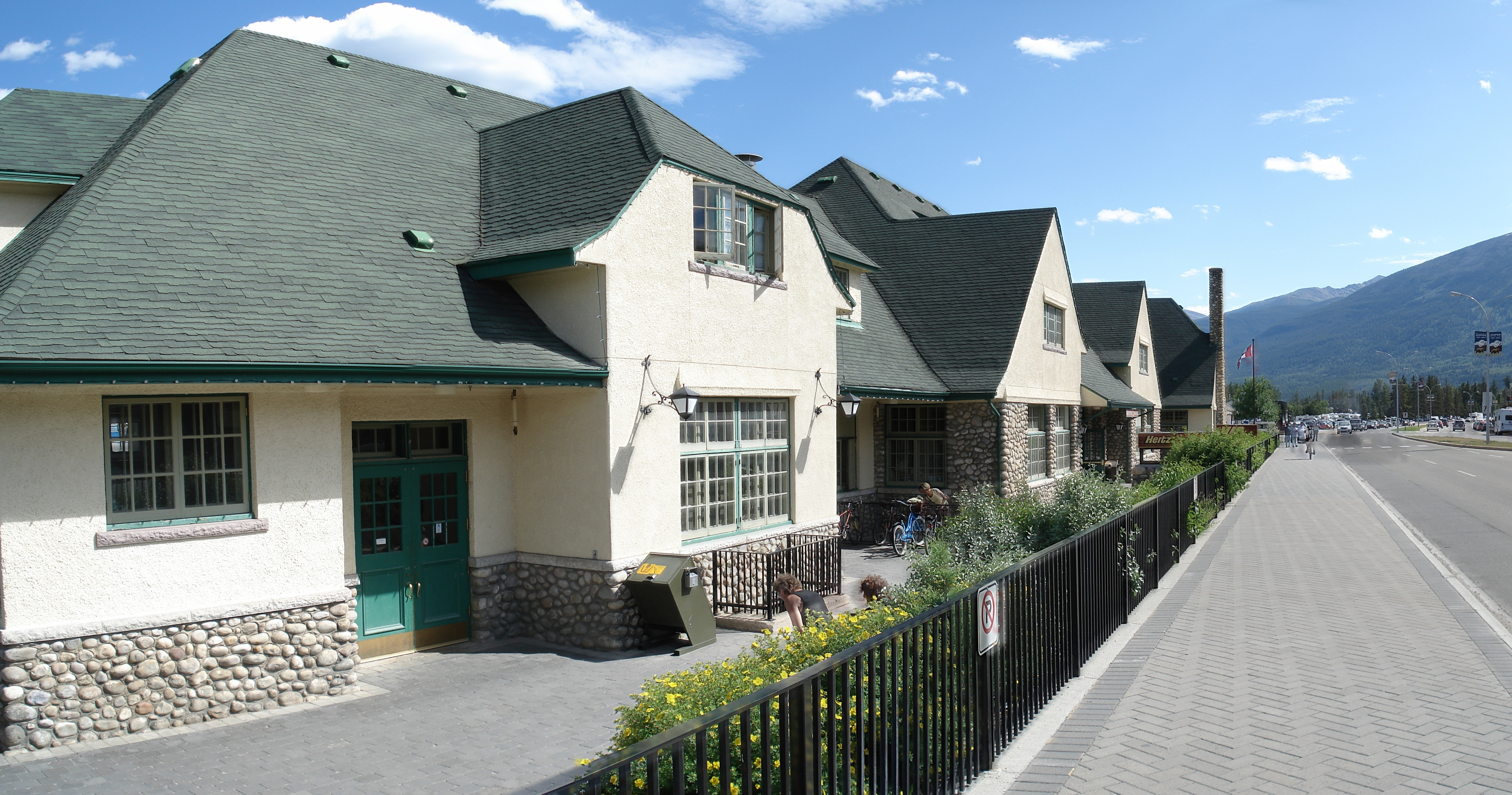

General information
- Location: 607 Connaught Drive, Jasper, Alberta; Canada
- Coordinates: 52°52′34″N 118°4′47″W
- Owner: Parks Canada
- Platforms: 1 side platform, 1 island platform
- Tracks: 2

Construction
- Parking: Yes
- Accessible: Yes

Other information
- Status: Staffed station
- Station code: JASP
- IATA code: XDH
- Website: Jasper train station

History
- Opened: 1926; 100 years ago

Services
Preceding station	Via Rail	Following station
Valemount toward Vancouver	The Canadian	Hinton toward Toronto
Harvey toward Prince Rupert	Jasper–Prince Rupert	Terminus
Preceding station	Rocky Mountaineer	Following station
Kamloops towards Vancouver	Journey Through the Clouds	Terminus
Former services
Preceding station	Canadian National Railway	Following station
Wynd toward Vancouver	Main Line	Henry House toward Montreal
Geikie toward Prince Rupert	Prince Rupert – Jasper	Terminus
Preceding station	Rocky Mountaineer	Following station
Quesnel towards North Vancouver	Rainforest to Gold Rush	Terminus
Quesnel towards North Vancouver	Coastal Passage	Terminus
Kamloops towards Seattle	Coastal Passage	Terminus
Preceding station	Via Rail	Following station
Vancouver Terminus	Super Continental	Edmonton toward Toronto
Location
- Location within Alberta Location within Canada

Jasper station is on the Canadian National Railway mainline in Jasper, Alberta. The station is served by Via Rail's The Canadian and is the eastern terminus for the Via Rail's Jasper – Prince Rupert train. The Rocky Mountaineer's Journey through the Clouds uses the station as a terminus.

== History ==
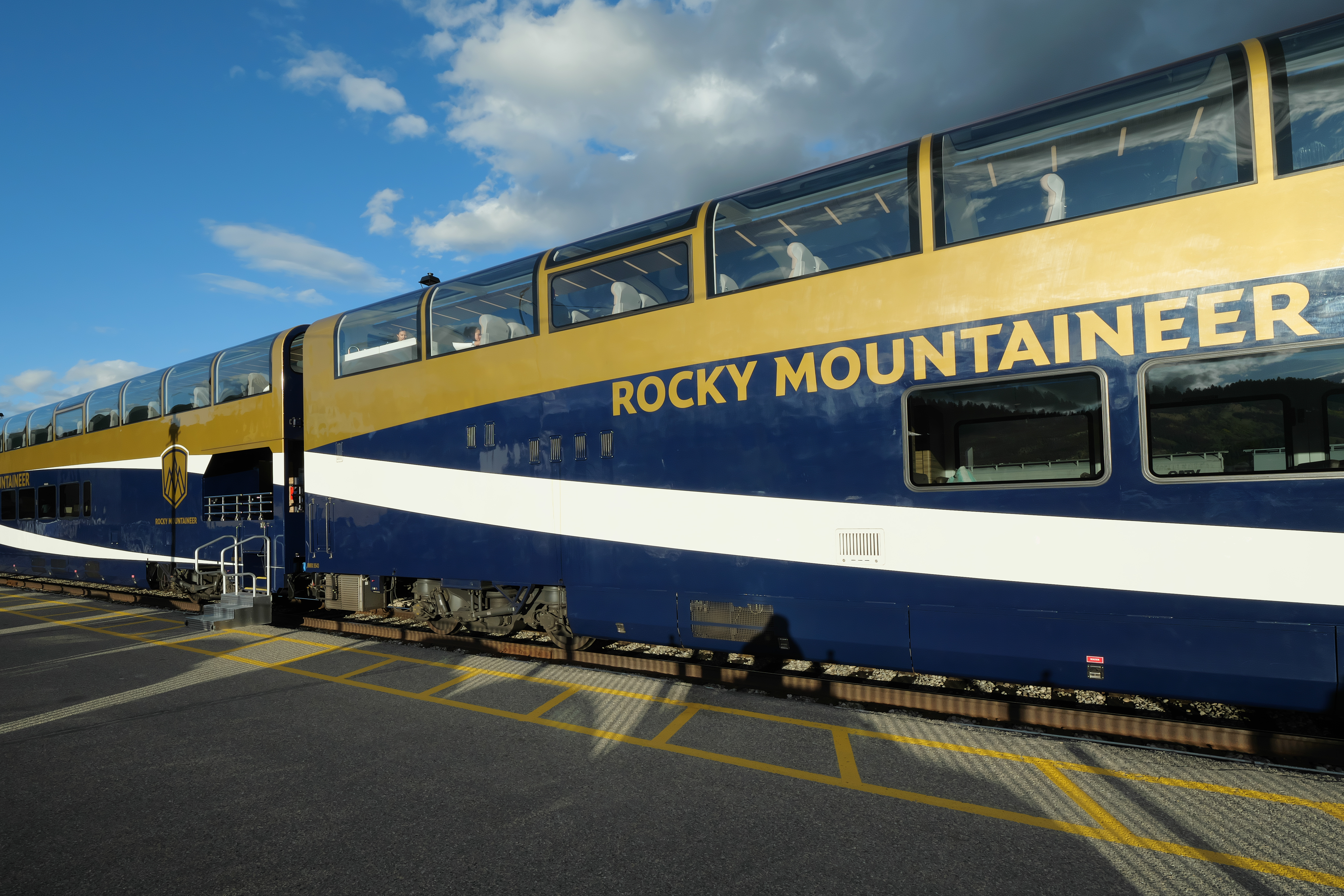
Two Goldleaf double-deck panorama cars of the Rocky Mountaineer in the station of Jasper

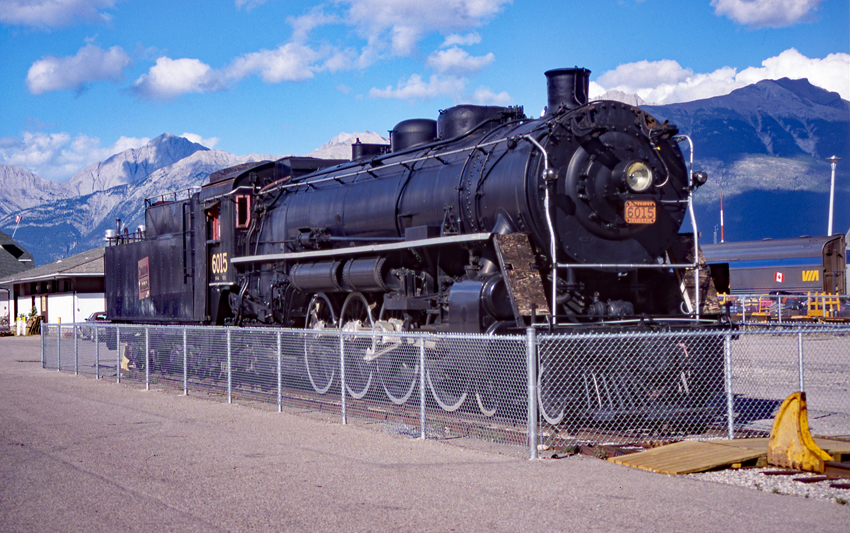
Canadian National 4-8-2 No 6015 preserved at Jasper

Jasper was created as a railway siding in 1911 by the Grand Trunk Pacific Railway. It was originally called Fitzhugh, part of the Grand Trunk Pacific's alphabet line, but was renamed in 1913 when the townsite was surveyed. By 1913 both the Grand Trunk and the Canadian Northern Railway called on Jasper. By 1923 the CNoR and the GTPR were taken oven by the Canadian government and merged into the Canadian National Railway, which continued to use the old GTPR station until it burned down during the winter of 1924–25.

The current station was constructed by the CNR in 1926. The station was declared a heritage railway station by the federal government in 1992.

== See also ==
- List of designated heritage railway stations of Canada
