= College Heights =

College Heights may refer to:

== Places ==
- College Heights, Alberta, a former hamlet in Lacombe, Alberta

=== Historic districts ===
- College Heights Historic District, in State College, Pennsylvania
- College Heights Historic District (Durham, North Carolina), on the National Register of Historic Places listings in Durham County, North Carolina
- College Heights Estates Historic District, in University Park, Maryland

== Schools ==
- College Heights Secondary School (disambiguation), several schools
- College Heights Elementary School, in Prince George, British Columbia

== Other uses ==
- College Heights Herald, the student newspaper of Western Kentucky University
