= Ferndale, British Columbia =

- Community
- Location of Ferndale in British Columbia Ferndale, British Columbia (Canada) Ferndale, British Columbia (North America)
- Coordinates: 53°59′10″N 122°29′40″W
- Country: Canada
- Province: British Columbia
- Land District: Cariboo
- Regional District: Fraser-Fort George
- Geographic Region: Robson Valley
- Time zone: UTC−07:00 (PT)
- Area codes: 250, 778

Ferndale is a scattered community located northeast of Prince George in central British Columbia. The name, derived from the numerous ferns in the district (or possibly Ferndale, Washington), appeared in the later 1920s. Adopted by the new school in 1931, and included as a settlement in Wrigley’s BC Directory for that year, the first newspaper reference was the following year. In earlier times, the northern part was considered as Willow River, and the western part as Shelley. Although Ferndale once stretched as far south as Tabor Lake, the 1977 completion of the Blackburn Bypass of Highway 16 effectively created the southern boundary. Comprising about 40 residences, it has a good-sized community hall, and the Ferndale-Tabor volunteer fire hall lies between the two localities.

== History ==
=== Railways & Speculation ===
Initially, the Grand Trunk Pacific Railway (GTP) planned following the Fraser River between Willow River and Hansard. About five miles (8.0 km) north of the Willow River confluence, heavy grades exist in the Giscome Rapids country. To find an alternative route, a survey party in the 1906 winter reviewed the possibility of a Prince George-Ferndale alignment, south along the Willow, across the divide, and east to follow the Bear River to its confluence south of Hansard. Subsequently, the surveyors discovered the superior shortcut via Eagle (Eaglet) Lake and Aleza Lake.

Consequently, the booklet's claim that political pressure caused the GTP to abandon the Ferndale route is false. In fact, the GTP regularly ignored government directives. The chartered CB&WR through the Willow River settlement proposed a line along the Willow River that never eventuated. Consequently, most of the early investors abandoned their properties. Apparently on speculation, Lord Londonderry had equally unwisely acquired a parcel of land (E side of Upper Fraser Rd, N of Ferndale Rd). This would be Charles Vane-Tempest-Stewart, 6th Marquess of Londonderry (1852–1915), and Charles Vane-Tempest-Stewart, 7th Marquess of Londonderry (1878–1949).

=== Misidentified Pioneers ===
Although listed as pioneer settlers, Tom Sullivan, Elmer Cahoun, Mr. Bushell, George Teats, Bob McRorrie, and Ivor and Harry Guest, may have owned speculative properties, but no evidence of residence is apparent. Thomas Sullivan (1873–1951) owned land north of the Fraser River near Salmon River. Marcus Elmer Cahoon (1885–1957), a Public Works Department driver, who no doubt included the locality in his assigned duties, married Mary Isabella Stewart (1890–1969) in 1915.

Ivor B. Guest (1886–1980), and his brother Harry (1882–1973), arrived in South Fort George in 1911. During the 1912 summer, Ivor worked for the forestry service as a fire warden along the Crooked River. The following winter he broke trail for Kidd's Emmet Baxter (Shorty) Haynes' dog team taking mail, food, and whisky, to the GTP construction camps. Ivor operated a trading post at McLeod Lake 1914–20, interrupted by almost three years army service. A keen amateur photographer, he ran a photography supply, fishing tackle and stationery store in Prince George 1922–75. He married Mary Elizabeth Howes (1895–1979 in 1923. Harry B. Guest married Augusta Freida Grossman (c.1892–?) in 1915. He was connected with the pharmaceutical trade, and became a partner in the Prince George Drug Co. 1917–31. As coroner for the region throughout the 1920s, he no doubt examined cases in the vicinity. Harry's family relocated to Vancouver in the early 1930s.

=== Pioneer Forestry, Farming & Mining ===
Arden Pickering, E.C. Perry and Fritz Bertschi appear to be the only bona fide Ferndale pioneers on the list. Leaving his family at Wardner, George Pickering took up a quarter section preemption (E of Upper Fraser Rd, S side of Perry Rd) in 1910, but died in 1913. The following year, Arden (1889–1979), his son, moved onto the farm. In 1921, he married Ettie Muma (1899–1974). Their children were Cecil (1922–74), William (Bill) (1924–84), George (1926–27), Earl, Len (probably 1929–2004), Clara, Dorothy, L. Gordon (Gordie) (1936–2012), Nina (probably 1937–2004), Howard (1939–64), and Shirley. The absence of nearby schooling for the older children prompted the move to Mud River around 1929, but the family relocated to Prince George in 1950.

The outbreak of World War I, and the decreased availability of capital, delayed the development of the high-grade gold, silver and copper ore seams discovered near Ferndale by William Bonner around 1913. A decade later, the Snowshoe partnership, managed by Bonner, drilled exploratory shafts that showed promising results. A similar exercise at other sites equally encouraged another syndicate and the Bertschi brothers. In default for his 1927–30 financial contributions, Bonner forfeited his interest in the claim. By 1936, Alexander (Alex) Hutchison (1879–1961) was also in default. At that time, Alex was in the cordwood business.

Albert Fredrick Bertschi (1889–1971) was a B.X. riverboat engineer from 1914. He married Emma Bruegger (1896–1959), and settled in 1920 (about 1.5 miles (2.4 km) W of Upper Fraser Rd on Shelley Rd E). He operated the first horse-driven sawmill in the area. The improved section of their 160-acre farm comprised hay and poultry.

Longtime city worker Louis (1882–1951) & Eveline (1900–88) Strugala lived in Prince George from about 1919. Their children were Robert (1925–41), who died of pneumonia, Dorothy (1927–77), and Carol (1936–?). The Strugala farm was on Shelley Road N. about 4 miles (6.4 km) from the Bertschi property. Louis was acquitted at trial for the 1931 shooting at and wounding straying Bertschi horses that ate his oat crop.

The Bertschi children were Rosabelle (Rose) (c.1925–2016), Arnold Louis (Louie) (1927–2016), Albert Frederick (1931–2011), Charles (Charlie) Henry (1934–2015), and Margaret. Over time, Louie and Albert Fred assumed more responsibility for the farm, and Albert Fred and Charlie for the logging operation. Louie and Charlie never married. In the early 1940s, the family produced railway ties, and had a logging camp on the property. In 1944, A.F. Bertschi Sr. had a severe heart attack, and Rose left for Vancouver. Five years later, she married Henry Gray Munro. By this time, the farm had pigs and a dairy herd. Emma's butter and cheese were unrivaled.

In 1952, Louie suffered a facial injury at one of the local mills, requiring a short hospital stay. The next year, Bertschi Sr. advertised the farm for sale. The couple moved to Prince George in 1954. Louie continued managing the farm at least until the early 1960s. In 1963, Albert Fred married Fern Elizabeth Adams. The period of operation of the small Bertschi Bros.' sawmill included the 1950s, the 1970s (manufacturing cabins), and the 1990s (log homes).

Edwin C. (1880–1927) & Frances A. (1880–1974) Perry purchased their property (about seven miles (11 km) E of Upper Fraser Rd, on S side of Perry Rd) in 1914, but the family initially resided a few years in Prince George, while Edwin was alone at the homestead. On one occasion during this period, Edwin disappeared for six months while he tracked, but failed to retrieve, an expensive pair of newly obtained horses that had escaped. Their children were Lila (c.1907–?), Myles (1914–?), and John (1918–2017). John was the first baby born to Caucasians in the locality. During the Great Depression, the brothers made their living mining gold, and guiding and packing miners up the Willow River. They also had an episode with a newly purchased purebred bull that escaped by plunging into the flooded Willow River. They pursued the animal seven miles (11 km) downstream, and after a long struggle, led it to their parked wagon south of Giscome. In 1936, a cow moose attacked and twice tossed John, who was fencing on the farm. The animal then followed and cornered him in a shed, from which he finally escaped with bruises and scratches.

Myles married Margaret Goddard (1914–1993), who had arrived in 1937 as the schoolteacher, and remained actively involved in community projects. John married Mona Calhoun in 1940, but divorced in 1945. In 1942, the brothers tracked and killed a young grizzly that had feasted on more than 25 of their chickens. In 1939, John and Myles purchased a decrepit small sawmill. The two-cylinder tractor motor, sourced to be the power unit, regularly caught fire. A few years later, they purchased a small sawmill from Carl William Strom of Willow River, which cleared the trees on the family farm by the Willow River. Available timber stands determined later relocations. In 1951, John married Dorothy Pickering. That year, he suffered a serious back injury, requiring an eight-month hospital stay, which left him crippled. At its peak, the 8,000–9,000 feet capacity sawmill remained in use until 1964, after which it became more profitable to sell raw logs rather than rough-cut lumber to the large operators. The Perry Bros.' logging and ranch operated into the 1990s. They still held TSLs (Timber Sales Licences) in 1999.

Ottiso (Otis) (1873–1955) & Laura (1874–1961) Pariso farmed (W of Upper Fraser Rd, N of Ferndale Rd) from 1920 until their retirement around 1945. Their son Leo died at five. In 1920, daughter Muriel Mildred (1898–1987) married Herman G. Griese (1892–1940) of Shelley, and later married Per Arvid Edmark (1893–1979).

Chris Cron (1876–1961) farmed from the 1920s until the 1950s. He hauled his harvested hay to Shelley for rail freighting to the Upper Fraser mill for feeding their logging horses.

Brothers Levi (1879–1947) and William J.E. (1880–1950) Graham, whose spouses were sisters, held a preemption (immediately E of the Shelley Rd and Highway 16 junction). However, their focus was largely in Prince George, where Levi ran extensive business enterprises, and William was assistant and later fire chief.

Andres (c.1859–1930) & Otilia (Tillie) (1867–1940) Pipke settled in Prince George in 1915, and assumedly soon after, acquired their farming property in Ferndale. Their children were Tillie (1891–1959), two daughters who became Mmes. Shepherd and Kemp, Reinhold (1897–1957), Ludwig (Louie) (1905–92), and Wanda (1909–2000).

Alverino Perkoni Wassil (1892–1959), a.k.a. Albert Peter Wassil, Alvin Peter Wassil and Charles Wassil, apparently resided from 1914, but appears not to have been part of the early Caucasian social set. Initial reports on his death misidentified him as his brother Peter. He purchased the Pipke property in 1928 (E side of Upper Fraser Rd, N of Perry Rd). Apart from his World War II enlistment, Pius Vosylius (1884–1961), a.k.a. Peter (Pete) Wassil, resided from 1929 until his final illness. Selling his property (E of Upper Fraser Rd, N of Ferndale Rd) to Alan MacDonald, Pete moved to the former C. Cowell residence in 1957. His estate included another property (W of Giscome Rd, S of Highway 16).

John G. Nehring (1860–1946), and his teenage son Ralph (1896–1989), arrived at Prince George by scow in 1913. John's wife, Ernesyna (1864–1958) followed a short time later by stagecoach. They settled at Ferndale around 1920. In 1921, reports of Ralph's death in Seattle proved a misidentification, unlike a sibling who had died in the prior year. John established a sawmill in 1922, powered by a traction engine. Sons, Walter (1907–51) and Robert (1905–1928) were outstanding hockey players. Ralph married Elizabeth Schlitt (1910–2008) in 1929. John sold the mill (E of Giscome Rd, S of Highway 16) in 1941 to John H. Evensen, but his son Walter remained in the mill's employment until called up for active service. In 1946, Ralph and Walter operated a sawmill on their farm. Ralph's son Wilfrid Nehring and Ollie Florrel operated a mill. While later working at Evergreen Sawmill, Wilfrid sustained a critical head injury when a saw ejected a piece of machinery.

During the 1920s and early 1930s, Peter (Pete) (1886–1953) & Alexandria (c.1886–1964) Krawchuk (Krowchuk alternate spelling), who ran a mixed farm (immediately E of the Shelley Rd and Highway 16 junction), cleared only a small portion of their quarter section. Nick Kostuka received a one-year sentence for assaulting Alexandria.

Matilda Zilkie and Margaret Cowell were sisters. Charles (Charlie) W. (1880–1974) & Matilda S. (1898–1980) Zilkie settled in 1929, acquiring 90 acres from the Cowells (E side of Upper Fraser Rd, S of Ferndale Rd). Their children were Caroline, Anne (c.1921–?), C. William (Bill) (1923–2012), Rose, Emily (1929–?), and Frederick (Fred) (1931–2016). Assumedly, Caroline died in infancy. In 1938, Anne married Monte Mandruk. In 1943, a bear killed one of Charlie's pigs, and two of his horses died on the highway. Bill enlisted. Around 1944, Rose married Leslie Aiken (1916–96). Bill married Eileen in 1946, Emily married Mathew Handford in 1949, and Fred married Doreen in 1961. Only, Anne and Emily, who married locals, remained in Ferndale on marriage. After Fred left around 1960, only the Zilkie seniors remained throughout the 1960s. Matilda probably left after Charlie's death.

William (Bill) C. (1892–1969) & Margaret (1899–1970) Cowell settled on their 360-acre farm (W side of Upper Fraser Rd, S of Ferndale Rd) in the late 1920s. Their children were Charles (Charlie), George (1923–?), Nellie, and S. Catherine (Kate or Kaye) (c.1921–2009). Charlie played the accordion at dances. On marrying Robert Bean, Nellie moved to Sardis. Catherine married Alexander (Alex) Hubensky (1919–58), presumably the son of Alexander & Margaret. The newlyweds lived at Aleza Lake, and then Sardis. In 1960, after Alex's death during the Rogers Pass highway construction, Catherine settled in Salmon Arm.

From 1943, Martin Majerick (Majerik, Majorek, Myeric or Myric alternate spellings) operated a sawmill on the Cowell property. When a wrench slipped, he seriously injured his hand and lost one finger. Bill Cowell likely logged, because a birch log injured and pinned him for several hours. A 1945 fire destroyed the cookhouse. The following year, the mill relocated (W side of Upper Fraser Rd at S-bend, immediately N of Shelley Rd E). A falling tree killed Karl Kovach (1909–58), a teamster for the Majerick mill.

Both Charlie and George Cowell were wounded during World War II, and George required multiple hospital stays and a leg amputation. Margaret and George composed many songs, some of which CKPG radio played. In 1949, after Charlie shot an 80-pound cougar in Russell Hubensky's barn, they discovered Charlie's partly devoured dog. While at the Evensen sawmill the following year, George seriously hurt his arm when an engine he was cranking backfired. In the early 1950s, Charlie and George operated a sawmill, where Charlie injured his shoulder. Bill Cowell and Allan Wickum also had a mill (possibly on Allan’s property on W side of Upper Fraser Rd, N of Shelley Rd E), before Allan joined the Evergreen Sawmills. The last to relocate were Bill & Margaret in the mid-1960s.

=== Later Forestry & Farming ===
Michael (Mike) Kiss arrived in the 1930s. After retiring as a mill worker, he devoted his attention to his farm (W of Upper Fraser Rd, S side of Ferndale Rd), where he grew exceptional strawberries. His final mention was 1967.

Herman Karges (1904–89) arrived by the early 1930s. Daniel (Dan) (1888–1976) & Helena (Lena) (1895–1981) Morris spent the earlier years of their married life in lumber camps east of Prince George. Sons Andrew (Andy) (1926–99), and William (Bill) (1927–96), worked in their father's logging camps. During the later 1940s, Dan, in partnership with Jim Burke, logged and milled on the Karges' farm one mile west of the highway. This appears distinct from the other Karges' property (E side of Upper Fraser Rd, N of Perry Rd). Andy sustained serious lacerations to his foot at this time.

Jacob (1905–85) & Anne (1907–72) Pankew purchased the Krawchuk farm in 1937, where they developed a dairy herd, and grew hay. He operated a sawmill during the 1960s, which had a good safety record for both logging and milling. In 1964, an inebriated Jacob crashed his pickup truck head on into a parked BC Hydro truck displaying flashing warning lights. Being his second conviction for impaired driving, he received an 11-day jail term. The family relocated to Fort Nelson in 1966. Son Victor (1936–2009), a millwright, returned to the farm permanently in the 1980s.

John Karpicius (1900–88) farmed from the late 1930s (W side of Upper Fraser Rd, S of Ferndale Rd), and worked as a tie cutter. In 1939, he began logging birch trees for warplane veneer production. In 1940, both he and John G. Nehring, were found responsible for owning dogs that had killed or injured their counterparts' sheep and for shooting at those dogs. In 1944, Karpicius trucked lumber from the Martin Myric mill. Later that year while logging, he sustained two cracked ribs from a falling tree. The next year he went into partnership with Martin Schefer (1888–1975) (Schafer or Schaefer alternate spellings) (W of Upper Fraser Rd, S of Ferndale Rd) in setting up the Ferndale Lumber Co. Robert McComber from Willow River suffered a hand injury while operating the edger. Becoming one of the more significant operations, the company had up to three portable sawmills. In 1952, the sheriff seized the company assets, because of outstanding creditors' accounts, income tax and workers' compensation premiums. Thereafter, Karpicius returned to transporting lumber. The next year, the brakes failed on his fully loaded lumber truck. The collision with another truck caused extensive damage, but only minor injuries. In 1961, his loaded truck overturned during overnight fog. Following his retirement in 1966, he continued to prospect in the region and maintain a farm. His absence from the 1958 and 1967 early resident lists suggests he arrived after 1933 and was not around in 1968. His brother Anthony (Tony) Karpicius (1918–85), also a resident, worked in the forest industry and left a $56,000 bequest for a forestry scholarship.

After their wedding, M. Monte Mandruk (1914–63) & Anne M. Zilkie lived and farmed in Ferndale, except for two years at Shelley. Monte fractured his toe while working on their 40-acre property (E side of Upper Fraser Rd, S of Ferndale Rd). In 1949, Monte begun operating his new sawmill, moving it in successive years. In 1953, he went to work for Central Sawmills. They relocated to Courtenay in 1956. Monte drowned in Georgia Strait with a fishing companion, but despite an intensive search, their bodies were never found.

Chester A. (1902–91) & Alice M. (1908–83) Wickum settled in 1939. Their children were Allan (1928–?), Mervin (1930–2016), Joyce, Elizabeth (Betty), Barry (1932–46), Boyd, and William (Bill) (1937–89). Their farm (W of Upper Fraser Rd, N of Ferndale Rd) included pigs. In 1946, when a stone-boat tilted on a sharp turn, a water barrel on board toppled. The startled horses bolted and completely turned over the stone-boat, fatally fracturing 13-year-old Barry's skull. While harnessing a team to attend his grandson's funeral, William Thomas Carson (1877–1946), a local farmer, suffered a lethal heart attack. Afterward, his wife, Mary Elizabeth Carson (1880–1962) relocated. In 1953, Joyce M. married C. William (Bill) Straub and left. A year later, Elizabeth married Harvey Sims. In 1956, Mervin married Marguerite (Marg). Chester became the pound keeper for the area in 1958, relocating the pound to his property. Boyd married Aldene Watson (1940–2004) around 1959. On retiring in 1962, Chester and Alice moved to Willow River. In 1964, William C. Wickum married Marie Claudette Dellemare and the couple remained. By 1967, Boyd was the only family member at Ferndale, and he left sometime before 1977.

John H. Evensen (Evenson alternate spelling) (1910–2011) and his nephew Alfred Johnson in 1941 purchased the Nehring sawmill (E of Giscome Rd, S of Highway 16), but Alfred enlisted. Unlike the numerous small sawmills, the Evensen mill became one of more significant operations. A 1943 fire largely destroyed the Evensen mill, and Lyman Colebank (1898–1966) sustained a serious foot injury from a rolling log at the logging camp. Margaret E. Macdonald (1920–97), a teacher at the school, married Evensen in 1944, but the marriage did not last. The company sported a team in the sawmill softball league. In 1953, the mill built a new cookhouse for the residents of its small houses and bunkhouses. The next year, Gisela Eva Kohler (1924–2005) married Alfred and they resided near the mill. A 1961 forest fire threatened the mill and its timber stand. The mill, operating at the foot of the Tabor Mountain Ski Hill, permanently closed about this time. The partners sold the equipment in 1969 and moved away.

Alvilda Nystrom and Laila Johnson were sisters to John H. Evensen. Erick (Eric) (1892–1978) & Laila (1898–1973) Johnson with children Alfred (Fred) (1921–2015), Albin Erling (Melvin) (1927–2010), and Rena, arrived at the Evensen camp in 1943. Children Ruth, Rubin and Einar (1924–97) remained in Saskatchewan. At harvest time, the family visited the farm, after which Einar joined them at the Evensen sawmill for three months. Settled in Prince George, he married Selma Florell (1926–2012) in 1947. After Melvin suffered a painful eye injury when struck by a branch while logging, he relocated to Vancouver. By this time, all except Alfred had left the district.

Henry and Arthur Nystrom were brothers. Henry (c.1898–?) & Alvilda (1905–83) Nystrom, accompanied by children Jeanette, Lloyd, Amy, Raymond, James, and Norman (1929–90), arrived at the Evensen camp in 1943. Soon after, Violet, the eldest, moved from Saskatoon to Prince George. At harvest time, Alvilda and Lloyd visited the farm. That winter, Violet joined the family as the Evensen camp cook. During the 1950s, Lloyd joined the army, and Alvilda was cook at the North Star Sawmills. When Henry injured his back, son Raymond assumed his job.

Arthur (Art) M. (1903–57) & Gladys (1906–85) Nystrom, with children Adrienne (1927–2001), Beryl, and Sidney (1929–95), came to Prince George in 1946. Art was engaged in the Ferndale sawmill. In 1948, Adrienne married Alan H. MacDonald (1925–2005), an Evensen Sawmill worker, and they remained active in the community. Alan started his own mill, known as the A.H.M. Sawmill. Sidney, who also worked at the Evensen mill, was an asset to the softball team. Later, he joined Alan's mill, and married. In 1956, Beryl M. married Dennis M. Olsen and remained in Prince George.

In 1942, H.H. Abbott and Otto Killman (1907–76) opened the Abbott & Killman sawmill near Ferndale. The following year, Mr. Danielson suffered facial injuries at the mill.

When a 1942 fire destroyed the small mill owned by Oscar Nordeen and Hjalmar Sjokvist (c.1898–1943), the latter's replacement mill near Ferndale had teething problems and breakdowns. A plank ejected by the head saw struck Sjokvist on the forehead, killing him instantly. Nordeen temporarily managed the operation, until Leonard Proppe (1903–82) took over, and Nordeen returned to trucking lumber.

William (Bill) E. (1905–80) & Angelina (1909–78) Kirschke lived in Prince George. In 1943, Bill established the Six Mile Lake Sawmill, near the lake. Much of the logging was in the Ferndale area. During unloading from a sleigh, a falling log fatally crushed Grant Cameron (c.1910–1950). Six years later, the bush crew won logging and safety awards. Around 1959, the couple moved to Six Mile (Tabor) Lake. The widespread 1961 forest fire destroyed a company timber stand. At one point 80 firefighters were based at the sawmill. The following year, the couple retired to White Rock. Their son, Gerald (Gerry) (1941–94) was later a partner in the venture.

Alexander (Alex) (1897–1981) & Margaret (1898–1984) Hubensky (Hubenski alternate spelling) (W side of Upper Fraser Rd, N of Perry Rd), with daughters Alice (1920–2003) and Eunice (1923–98), arrived in 1944. Alice married George Wolczuk (1914–79) (E of Upper Fraser Rd, N side of Perry Rd), and Eunice married Joseph (Joe) Wolczuk (1916–90). They lived in Prince George. In the late 1940s, the Wolczuk brothers began Central Sawmills near Ferndale. In 1950, the mill, which burned down, took only three weeks to rebuild. This fairly significant operation was on the Hubensky farm, and was a.k.a. as the Hubensky sawmill. In 1951, Joe received babbit burns requiring hospital treatment. Two years later, George broke his foot. The enterprise moved with available timber limits. Around 1950, George and Alice began a small greenhouse in the Ferndale area. Selling the mill in 1957, the couple started a well-known Prince George nursery.

In 1944, Percy (1903–74) & Dorothy (1909–80) Church arrived and opened a sawmill. Within a few years, the operations expanded to Willow River.

Adeline B. Crawford of Willow River, who owned a farm, rented out a house on the property (E of Upper Fraser Rd, second property back from school). A new sawmill opened on the farm in 1947.

Arthur J. (1881–1972) & Margaret E. (1890–1975) Handford of Willow River settled (E of Upper Fraser Rd, S of Perry Rd) in 1946. Their children were Laura (1920-2005), John (1921–94), Mathew (1922–75), Grace (c.1924–1927), Mabel (1926–70), and Kelso (1928–?). John married Ilse Blanke (1919–91). In 1946, Arthur and his sons established Handford Sawmills on their Ferndale property, their new home. Mabel married Wesley Hodson of Vancouver. Mathew married Emily B. Zilkie, youngest daughter of Charles & Matilda Zilkie. In 1951, Kelso married Beatrice (Betty) Sood. The mill relocated the next year. In 1955, Arthur & Margaret moved to Prince George. With the mill relocations being farther away, their children followed. The final mention of their respective families as residents was 1951 for John, and 1957 for Kelso and Mathew (assuming Emily was a guest at the centennial banquet the following year). Subsequently, operating at various sites north of Prince George, the mill burned to the ground in 1965, and Mathew died in a logging accident a decade later. Kelso suffered spinal injuries in a single-vehicle accident in 1989.

A 1951 forest fire came close to the North Star mill, which operated during the early 1950s. Other mills at the time, of which the ownership is unclear, were G. & F. Sawmills, C. & W. Sawmills, and Evergreen Sawmills. The 15–20 smaller sawmills in operation were rarely a financial success, many lasting only one or two seasons. Billy Shyminski, who sustained a head injury at a local logging camp, spent several months in a Vancouver hospital, and required further treatment. Pete Tonesschuk's (Tanesschuk or Tonesschuck alternate spellings) head injury required several hospital stays.

A fire at John Kupka's mill destroyed lumber and logs, but a neighbour pulled away the power unit and edger with a tractor.

Franklin (Frank) R. (1927–2019) & Lorraine G. (1930–2015) Fortin, with daughter Mary Ellen, arrived in the early 1950s. He established Fortin Sawmills, which relocated in 1959 to southeast of Guilford.

=== Community ===
The school opened in 1931, with Mrs. Helen Hansen (1907–78), later at Hansard, teaching the eight pupils. Governed by the Ferndale School Board 1931–46, School District 57 assumed responsibility thereafter.

At the close of term in 1934, despite the cold water, teacher Miss Betty Davis swam across the river at Shelley. During the latter 1930s, Thompson, Ferndale, Tabor Creek and Cale Creek held an annual interschool athletic competition. The school was the venue for community dances. During World War II many were in aid of the Red Cross, with dances continuing after the war. The teacherage stood beside the school (E side of Upper Fraser Rd at S-bend, S of Shelley Rd E).

When Christian Carlson (1854–1917) and Ovidia Baarlie (1872–1933), Evangelical Lutherans, married in 1895, theirs was the first marriage of a Caucasian couple at Bella Coola. Their children were Victor (Vic) J. (1897–?), Carl S. (1899–1974), Harold M. (1903–29), Earl B. (c.1907–1937), Orville C. (1908–2001), and Alfred E. (1910–86).

During 1934, Orville and Vic, based in Prince George, were involved in the Sunday School Mission of BC, which included work in the Six Mile (Tabor) area. Earl left Prince George that year to be a missionary in China, with Orville following the next year. Earl succumbed to typhus. Meanwhile, Vic, who moved to Ferndale (W of Upper Fraser Rd, N of Highway 16), held Sunday school and church services at Shelley school every Sunday evening. Carl, who appeared more humanitarian than evangelical, also resided at Ferndale, but left intermittently during the 1940s. In 1939, Vic opened and part-time pastored the Earl Carlson Memorial Church (W side of Upper Fraser Rd, S of Perry Rd). When the congregation became a Salvation Army outpost, Vic received the rank of sergeant. This may be the group later called the Gospel Mission. Vic remained a sawmill worker until he left with H. E. Mathias in 1944 to operate a sawmill at Chemainus. Alfred was a CNR section hand (track maintenance), who progressed to acting foreman, and then acting roadmaster.

Mrs. Sjokvist (assumedly Grace Evelyn [1913–86], widow of Hjalmar), held a Sabbath school class every Saturday at her home. In 1944, the school acquired a radio and implemented a hot lunch program. Teaching only one term, marriage took Miss Helen Maloff away. Her replacement in January 1946, Mrs. Grace A. Waters (c.1908–1946), had an invalid husband and two sons in Vancouver. She befriended Joseph (Joe) Polak (1903–46), who homesteaded (E of Upper Fraser Rd, N of Perry Rd) near the Perrys, and worked at the Majerick mill. She ended this friendship for unspecified reasons. A week later, he fatally stabbed her in the chest at the teacherage while her eight-year-old son Charles remained asleep in a bedroom. Within hours, outside a neighbour's farmhouse, Joe committed suicide with a rifle bullet to the head.

Although land had been set aside for a community hall, fundraising for the building began a decade later. Mrs. Gross' coffee shop, which existed for only five months owing to lack of business, did host a community dance. The building later became Herman Karges' barn. The former Perry Bros.' small cookhouse, moved to the site (W side of Upper Fraser Rd, N of Perry Rd) to become the first community hall. Opened in 1949, renovations involved much voluntary effort. This hall and its successor became the venue for regular dances, usually with music provided by a local band. A bean supper preceded one dance each year. Card parties were also held.

During the 1950s, Six Mile (Tabor) Lake was the venue for summer picnics that the community club organized.

Vernon (Vern) C. (1919–88) & Amy (1916–98) Scofield (Schofield alternate spelling) and their two young sons became residents in the early 1950s. Vernon suffered an eye injury while working in the bush, and had hospital stays for other ailments. The couple were active in the community, but moved to Prince George months before their son's wedding. Philip Scofield (1933–2005) and Betty Scott were also residents at this time. Her father, John Fredrick Scott (1914–65), and family resided 1945–56. On their marriage in 1953, Philip and Betty lived (E of Giscome Rd, immediately S of Highway 16) Jean and John were their older children. When Betty's car exploded in 1961, daughters Judy (4) and Jo-Ann (2) sustained burns to face and arms, that required skin grafts. Russell (1909–94) & Florence (1917–2009) Scofield, Philip's parents, resided from 1956 to the early 1970s.

Miss Mary S.W. Killingly, who commenced as teacher for 1950/51, was actively involved in community functions, where she would have met Raymond (Ray) C. Inkster. Marrying in 1952, they relocated to Prince Albert, Saskatchewan, but resettled in December and resumed community involvement. In partnership with Clarence Lapp, the Inkster and Lapp sawmill (E of Upper Fraser Rd, S of Ferndale Rd) operated during the mid-1950s. Mrs. Charlotte Lapp was community association president for 1955, and teacher for the 1957/58 school year, before assuming the Willow River primary grades.

A BC Centennial project, the new community hall was dedicated in 1958. Over 100 adults and children attended the centennial banquet. Pioneer scrolls acknowledged Mr. and Mrs. A.F. Bertschi, Albert and Louis Bertschi, Mr. and Mrs. W. Cowell, Mike Kiss, Mrs. Frances Perry, Pius Vosylius, and Mr. and Mrs. Charlie Zilkie. Albert and Louis Bertschi, George and Charles Cowell, Emily Handford, Herman Karges, Myles and John Perry, and Fred Zilkie, received a commemorative certificate acknowledging at least 25 years of residency.

In 1967, Mrs. F.A. Perry, Mr. and Mrs. Charles Zilkie, A.F. Bertschi, Mike Kiss, John Perry, Mr. and Mrs. Myles Perry, Louis Bertschi, Albert Bertschi and Boyd Wickum received a commemorative certificate acknowledging residency prior to 1940.

In 1955, the teacherage received a new oil burner. Student enrolments ranged 11–14 in the late 1940s, and 9–25 in the 1950s. When the school closed in 1960, because enrolment fell below 10, a bus transported students to Bonnet Hill School, but several parents complained about the schedule. The following year, the school building moved to Shelley. Proposals five years later to rebuild the school did not proceed.

From 1979, either the community association, or the volunteer fire department, hosted the fundraising community hall dances, which ultimately became an annual harvest dance and Halloween dance respectively.

During the 1980s, the 4-H youth club began. The annual "Snow Fever Days", a program of dogsled races, accompanied by side attractions and a dance at night, commenced, but soon relocated to Tabor Lake.

The RDFFG implemented house numbering in 1989. Zenmar Feeds, selling livestock feed, pet feed, and farm supplies, opened that year on Ferndale Road.

=== Crime, Calamity & Safety Measures ===
In 1937 while descending the hill at Ferndale School with a load of ties, Andy Iverson of Shelley lost control of his horse team. On crashing, he sustained cuts to his head and face.

During the early 1950s, breaking a taxi driver's jaw, during an assault at a Ferndale mill, cost passenger William Kraft six months hard labour. Seven-year-old Harry Lacoursiere sustained severe bruises and cuts to his upper body when struck by log. Stray horses in the district broke down fences, ruined gardens, and were a general nuisance. Juvenile vandalism and pilfering occurred in waves.

Prince George lumber executive Ross Davis' (1918–65) light plane went missing on a flight from Grande Prairie to Prince George. After some unsuccessful searches in the Monkman Pass, a helicopter pilot sighted the wreckage at that location. Meanwhile, false sightings prompted searches in the Ferndale area. On one ground search, private residents themselves became lost.

In 1969, children suffered minor injuries when a school bus failed to take a curve on the icy road at the bottom of Ferndale Hill and flipped. The responding ambulance skidded and hit a pole on the same slippery surface.

When residents lost their possessions in houses that burned to the ground, the community rallied with aid. In 1980, a volunteer fire department started without government assistance. The fire chief parked at his place the 350-gallon capacity old fire truck donated by Prince George Pulp and Paper. The department initially rejected offers to operate under the umbrella of the RDFFG, because of the burden it would place upon residents' property taxes. In 1982, a site was cleared and a temporary shelter erected for the two fire trucks. A 1984 referendum voted in favour of a $200,000 loan for acquiring land, constructing a permanent fire hall and buying a fire truck and equipment. Repayment was from property taxes spread over a 20-year period. 1985 saw the acquisitions ordered, and the construction contract awarded. The British Columbia Lottery Corporation made a $40,000 grant for the fire hall. The following year, policy conflicts within the department came to a head, resulting in the termination of the assistant chief and six members. Volunteer firefighter David Peter Hryniuk (1942–95) died battling a fire at his own home. He was deputy fire chief in the team of about 25 volunteers. In 1997, the department installed their existing 1,500-gallon water tank on a new Freightliner chassis. In 2001, the team acquired a new $310,000 pumper truck.

A 2012 case of a marijuana grow-operation, kidnapping at gunpoint, and torture for six days at a Ferndale house from which the victim escaped, fell apart when the presiding judge became ill and soon died. At the retrial, the victim was jailed for two years for refusing to testify a second time, and the alleged perpetrators, Michael Andrew Joseph Fitzgerald, Craig Anthony Niedermayer, and brothers Francois Christiaan Meerholz and Dillan Meerholz, walked free. A 2007 theft conviction triggered a later reprieved deportation order for Francois. Subsequent firearm charges were stayed, and driving-related ones earned 90 days in jail. Dillan faced charges of aggravated assault and assault causing bodily harm from a November 2009 incident. Niedermayer later faced trafficking and five firearms charges for a 2016 seizure by police.

=== Roads ===
A First Nations trail existed from Prince George via Six Mile (Tabor) Lake, which reached Willow River. The 1915 completion of a wagon road, terminating at the southern river bank, likely motivated residents Albert Fritz Bertschi and his brother Arnold Karl Bertschi (1883–1950) to build a feeder road westward to Shelley (Shelley Road East). By the 1920s, there was also a trail to Foreman, possibly linking what is now Ferndale & Bertschi Roads. Summer grading and gravelling maintained the highway, which was generally good as far north as the turn-off to Shelley, after which it was fair. The paving from Prince George reached Ferndale in 1967 and extended beyond Willow River in 1968. The opening of the paved Blackburn bypass in 1977 reduced the travel distance by 2.2 kilometres (1.4 mi).

=== Broadcast Transmissions & Communications Devices ===
In 1952, local firms Ferndale Lumber Co., Evensen Sawmills and Central Sawmills, installed radiotelephones at their premises. Television came to the Willow River area in 1961. In 1992, cell phone coverage reached the area.

=== Electricity & Natural Gas ===
In 1961 BC Hydro extended distribution lines from Six Mile (Tabor) Lake. The 1996 referendum to establish a natural gas service for the Ferndale area was assumedly successful, because it currently exists.
