= Valemount (disambiguation) =

Valemount is a village in British Columbia. Valemount may also refer to:

- Valemount Airport
- Valemount Elementary School
- Valemount Secondary School
- Valemount railway station
- Valemont, a miniseries on MTV
