= Centre for Learning Alternatives SD57 =

Centre for Learning Alternatives

Location
- 3400 Westwood Dr. Prince George, British Columbia, V2N 1S1; Canada
- Coordinates: 53°53′12″N 122°46′41″W

Information
- School type: Public, alternative school
- School board: School District 57 Prince George
- Principal: Mr. Curtis MacDonald

The Centre for Learning Alternatives (CLA) is a public alternative school operating within School District 57 Prince George. Opening in 2007, the centre had 122 full-time equivalent adult students. Offering distance, continuing, alternative and international education, it comprised a downtown headquarters with several satellite locations. In 2010, the facility relocated to the former John McInnis Jr. Secondary School.

The CLA, which enables students to complete gaps in their secondary education, largely caters to individuals who have either abandoned or need additional support beyond regular school. This includes helping students gain high school diplomas or school-leaving certificates. In addition to covering core subjects and electives, the school oversees off-site alternative programs for elementary and middle schoolers with behavioural issues, at-risk students aged 14 to 17, and 17- to 19-year-olds transitioning to college. Students might have severe learning disabilities, drug addiction or psychological issues, be street kids, or pregnant or parenting teens.

The CLA also offers distance and continuing education, summer school, and courses for new Canadians learning English. The facility houses various student support services staff, such as speech therapists, child psychologists, occupational therapists, hearing- or visually-impaired student specialists, district resource teachers and international settlement workers.
