= Willow River, British Columbia =

- Community
- Location of Willow River in British Columbia
- Coordinates: 54°04′00″N 122°28′00″W
- Country: Canada
- Province: British Columbia
- Land District: Cariboo
- Regional District: Fraser-Fort George
- Geographic Region: Robson Valley
- Time zone: UTC−07:00 (PT)
- Area codes: 250, 778

Willow River is a community northeast of Prince George, on the northeast bank of the Willow River, 2.5 kilometres (1.6 mi) southeast of the confluence with the Fraser River, in central British Columbia. The name derives from the many willow swamps in the river valley. Comprising about 150 residents, it has a general store/post-office, a volunteer fire department, church building and a small community hall. Street map.

== Transportation ==
A trackside signpost marks the flag stop for Via Rail's Jasper – Prince Rupert train. The immediate Via Rail stops are Prince George to the southwest and Aleza Lake to the east.

== History ==
=== Railways & Speculation ===
The river confluence, close proximity to the Salmon River, and being handy to the Giscome Portage, made it a strategic location. The Cariboo, Barkerville & Willow River Railway (CB&WR) proposed linking Barkerville and Eagle (Eaglet) Lake. In its 1909 Annual Report, the Willow River Timber Co. (WRT) of Ontario highlighted the line's value in accessing the company's remote timber limits in the upper reaches of the Willow River. Investing $1.5 million in timber limits, a British syndicate planned a mammoth sawmill at the river mouth. The CB&WR never eventuated. Asset sales followed the 1922 WRT receivership.

By 1912, a Victoria-based syndicate acquired Lot 788, and the GTP acquired Lot 785, which was about two miles (3.2 km) due east and across the Willow River. Lot 782 lay between. That March, the Railway Commission had approved the future station location as near the centre of Lot 785. The Lot 788 syndicate widely publicized a 2,500-lot subdivision called "Willow City" on the soon coming Grand Trunk Pacific Railway (GTP) and at the terminal for the proposed Pacific & Hudson Bay Railway (P&HB), and additional misleading claims. Although, the proposed P&HB passed no closer than 20 miles (32 km) away, the locality was a possible terminus for an unlikely branch line crossing the Fraser, but no track ever eventuated anywhere. Tree clearing defined the planned streets the following year. Meanwhile, the GTP surveyed and subdivided its land, and contracted to have the 40 acres cleared by Christmas. Further lots were surveyed, and cleared. Warning prospective buyers not to confuse their 640-acre development with the syndicate's one three miles (4.8 km) away by rail from the planned station, the GTP began marketing their real estate. Already owning Lot 784, bordering to the north, the GTP also purchased Lot 781, northwest of the latter, to secure an overland access to the Fraser.

The syndicate renamed its parcel as "Willow River", and then further described the location as "the only townsite registered as Willow River". Either their acquisition of Lot 782 between the two developments or legal pressure amended it to "next to the GTP townsite of Willow River". The devious marketing practices created some buyer remorse among naïve faraway investors. Most of the premium lots with river frontage are now merely river silt. Meanwhile, the GTP weekly advertisements publicized their land as "the only one official and original GTP town of Willow River". Based in South Fort George, F.W. Crawford, the BC manager of the GTP's Transcontinental Townsites Co., was also secretary-treasurer of the chamber of commerce and a director of the Herald. The start of World War I saw land prices tumble. The syndicate lots never became more than rural and the GTP ones ultimately attained merely a hint of the significance promised by the promoters. Of the surveyed GTP town, the demand for lots evaporated. Only a quarter of the land, comprising the central portion and a sliver east along Railway Ave. to slightly beyond the Upper Fraser Rd. intersection, was eventually developed, but half these lots have since reverted to open spaces. (1913 map)

The Prince George-Willow River sternwheeler service provided a destination for day excursions, and an indispensable link until the railway service became reliable.

Willow River lies at Mile 127.0, Fraser Subdivision (about Mile 216.5 during the line's construction). The hospital, near the mouth on Hospital Creek, was at Mile 217. The 17-mile (27 km) railway right-of-way contract, completed by J.M. Kullander (Collander alternate spelling) during 1912/13, advanced from camps at Miles 208 and 217, and encompassed Willow River, Giscome and Newlands. The camp received some supplies from Prince George, but most came down the Fraser River. A. Roy Spurr (1885–1954), later at Penny, maintained a camp store and accommodation at this time. The unprecedented low water limiting navigation on the Upper Fraser (which beached steamboats) made it impossible to transport steam shovels downstream in 1912. Fortunately, the Collander contract was primarily light work through considerable muskeg. During the following springtime, a large force was at work, but much of the unfinished grade was submerged. In late summer, near the D.J. Carey (Siems, Carey & Co.) camp southwest of the river mouth at Mile 220, the single firing of over 200 tons of explosives demolished a solid rock hill. The previous winter, an employee at Carey's camp, who suffered frostbite when lost, had both feet amputated at the GTP hospital.

Willow River, like Shelley to its southwest, and Giscome to its east, was an original train station (1914) on the GTP (the Canadian National Railway after nationalization). The railway bridge spans at Mile 127.8 (formerly about Mile 217.3). Although tracks were supposedly laid across this bridge on 31 December 1913, the discrepancy of having reached Mile 220 the previous day probably indicates that mileage references in newspapers were sometimes approximations.

In 1920, around three miles (4.8 km) to the west, a freight locomotive derailed and submerged in the Fraser River.

About two miles (3.2 km) to the east, a westbound passenger train fatally struck Albert Beacham (1923–40), who was likely asleep on the track. The wheels severed his head, one arm at the shoulder, one arm at the elbow, and the right foot at the ankle.

Trains regularly struck straying livestock. When a collision demolished a fully laden Geddes lumber truck on the old highway level crossing in 1947, the driver escaped with only concussion and fractures. A decade later, Max Pious suffered fatal injuries when struck by a freight train near the settlement. After passing trains had destroyed 100 head of cattle between Willow River and Aleza Lake during 1958–63, the CNR erected protective fencing. Passing in front of a moving train at the crossing, after failing to stop and properly check, a school bus narrowly avoided danger. In 1996, a train struck an unoccupied truck.

The station, at the foot of Willow St., had a 700-foot freight platform. Built in 1914, the standard-design Plan 100‐152 (Bohi's Type E) structure was boarded up in 1969. An unidentified freight and passenger shelter, relocated from Decker Lake that year, remained into the 2000s. The original building continued to be vandalized, and was demolished in 1982.

Service	1914–c.1921	c.1921–c.1929	c.1930–c.1939	c.1940–c.1948	c.1949–1968	1968–1977	1977–present
Passenger	Regular stop	Regular stop		Flag stop	Regular stop	Flag stop	Flag stop
Way freight	Flag stop probably	Regular stop	Regular stop	Regular stop	Regular stop	Regular stop	

Siding	Mile No.	1922	1933	1943	1960	1965–72	1977
(Capacity Length)		Cars	Cars	Cars	Cars	Cars	Feet
Willow River	127.0	67	66	58	53	54	2,540

Other Tracks	Mile No.	1920–22	1933	1942–43	1960	1965–68	1972	1977
(Capacity Length)		Cars	Cars		Cars	Cars	Cars	Feet
Geddes Lumber	126.7				7			
Etter & McDougall	127.0		18	At capacity/upgraded				
P.S. Church	127.1				4			
Outfit Spur	127.3				14	14		
Northern Lumber	127.8	Unknown						
Rock Pit	129.6							1,450
Rock Spur	130.0				50	47	47	

=== Pioneer Forestry & Farming ===
By 1911, J.M. Wiley (Wylie alternate spelling), a Winnipeg grain operator had 50 acres of his cleared land under cultivation. Tenant farmers worked the ranch, which comprised Lot 780 that straddled the river mouth. Fred Burden acquired an interest in this property.

Two pioneer farmers in the area were Ralph McVoy (1864–1934), and Charles (Charlie) T. Harvie (1879–1962) (Harvey alternate spelling). McVoy was also involved in railway tie contracting. Retired from farming, his body was discovered in the Fraser River near Shelley. A coroner's jury returned an open verdict on his death from a rifle wound inflicted by a person unknown, but locals suspected murder. Charlie arrived about 1912, joined by his brother Fred Harvie (1876–1955) in 1914, whose family followed the next year. Ira W. Lewis (c.1877–1955) arrived in 1913. His family followed during the 1914 springtime, the McBride-Willow River segment taking three days, owing to track conditions west of Hansard. They moved to Giscome in 1916. The Harvies left around 1917 when Charlie sold his farm near the river mouth to William H. Fairis, who became known for his fine hay, grain and vegetable crops. His strawberries were popular, and the potato yields prolific on his preemption. Though the influenza epidemic infected his whole family, they all survived. By the time the Royal Bank successfully sued him for failing to honour a promissory note, he had sold his property, and returned permanently to Illinois.

John (1869–1943) & Eliza (1876–1948) Golder arrived in 1914 and he practised as a veterinary surgeon. John had fulfilled this role for Foley, Welch and Stewart, having been in charge of all livestock during the railway construction. While building his practice, teamster employment supplemented his income. They retired to Vancouver in 1941. Their children were James (c.1904–?), Marion Hastie (Maisie) (probably 1907–44), Marguerite (Greta) (1909–?), Edith (c.1912–1915), Winnifred (c.1914–1916), and Joan. When Maisie married Walter James Henry, it is unclear how long they remained. In 1984, Walter's ashes were spread on Strawberry Hill (immediately northeast of the Upper Fraser Rd. intersection). Marguerite married Arthur Hensbee. In 1933, their two-year-old son drowned at Snowshoe. That year, James who had served in the US Navy, settled in the US. Joan left with her parents, later marrying John Hall.

In 1915, American entrepreneur A.C. Frost built a sawmill. This is likely Albert Carl Frost (1865–1941), who is often confused with Andrew Christian Frost (c.1846–1924). The following year, when a forest fire driven by high winds threatened to destroy the town and sawmill, every available man (assisted by an additional 100 men dispatched on a special train from Prince George) successfully contained it. Such fires were an ever-present danger. On realizing the Willow River was unsuitable for conveying logs, the never used sawmill was dismantled and moved to Giscome that December.

In 1917, the Northern Lumber Co. opened a mill west of the railway bridge. When destroyed by fire in 1919, the lumber piles, outbuildings, boilers and engines escaped damage. That year, Martin Olson purchased an interest. The mill rebuilt with a 20,000-foot per shift capacity, Olson acquired total ownership. Enlarged to a 32,000 capacity, the mill was sold, dismantled and moved to Hansard, but contractors continued to hand hew railway ties.

Prior to enlisting in 1914, Thomas (Tom) Standing secured a homestead north of the hamlet. Marrying Jane (?–1948), the couple, and infants Mary and Elizabeth, resided 1919–40. Tom grew strawberries and kept pigs, dairy cows, chickens and rabbits. Although returning after Jane's operation and convalescence in Edmonton, they relocated to Alberta permanently. Mary married Morris Brooks of Giscome. Elizabeth trained as a registered nurse in Edmonton, where she worked, and later married Robert E. Piquette.

Harold John (Jack) (1877–1942) & Emily Alice (1885–1980) Brown arrived in 1924. Their children were William (Buster), Ruth, and Frederick Percy. Despite his tertiary education, Jack performed manual work at the Giscome logging camps and then planing mill. Instead of cows on their farm, they kept goats, and their goat cheese was renowned. They plowed with mules not horses and kept bees. They grew marrows, squash and pumpkins, rather than the usual peas and corn. Alice's knitting machine, the first in the community, produced woolen clothing for the family. She resided 56 years. The boys initially hacked ties locally. Percy left to work for Bend Lumber and Penny Sawmills. He enlisted, married in England, and on his discharge the couple settled in Vancouver. People who met Percy from the war onward called him Fred.

In 1926, Etter & McDougall opened the Willow River Lumber Co.'s 30,000-foot capacity mill, near today's Laidlaw Rd. Busy during the late 1920s, production slumped across the industry during the early Great Depression. After the mill burned to the ground in 1932, the company used the Newland's mill. During the late 1920s, Cooke Lumber operated a mill west of the railway bridge. The brothers do not appear to be related to pioneer William F. Cooke. In 1927, Steve Gaal (1903–72), (brother to Andrew Gaal formerly at Shelley, later at Aleza Lake), a mill employee, sustained a foot-long gash to his chest when he fell against a saw, but made a satisfactory recovery. The 10,000-foot capacity sawmill relocated the following year. Other smaller mills also operated during this era.

Arthur J. (1881–1972) & Margaret E. (1890–1975) Handford settled in 1927. Arthur worked at the Etter & McDougall mill until it closed. Their children were Laura (1920–2005), John (1921–94), Mathew (1922–75), M. Grace (c.1924–1927), Mabel (1926–70), and Kelso (1928–?). In 1942, John and Mathew enlisted. Around this time, Laura married Alfred W. Strom. In 1945, Kelso suffered a serious hand injury at the mill. After the war, Arthur and his three sons started Handford Sawmills in Ferndale, where they all relocated.

The narrow strip of accessible spruce forest bordering the railway that stretched some 100 miles (160 km) east of Prince George was known as the East Line.

=== Retail Commerce ===
William (Billy) (1877–1966) & A. Gestina (1886–1963) Gair, who were poultry farmers residing 1913–20, ran a boarding house and later a store. Their children were William (1909–89), George (1911–98), Louis (1913–98), A. Isabel, F. Jean, Edith (c.1924–?), and Becky.

The local newspaper, the Willow River Times, briefly existed. Charles Hannan was the inaugural postmaster 1914–16. Alexander (Alex) E. Brown (1874–1962), who followed 1916–19, moved to Giscome.

John (1881–1957) & Jane (1883–1971) Newsome operated a café, laundry and rooming tents at the GTP Jasper and Tête Jaune construction camps. Settling in Willow River in 1914, they continued their café and rooming business (a laundry already existed), augmented by a log-construction store on the east corner of Gwen and Willow. In 1917, John opened a new store in Giscome and later built stores in Newlands and Shelley. He was the Willow River postmaster 1919–57, a role commonly performed by a storeowner in such towns. He was likely the merchant who installed gas pumps in the early 1920s. In 1938, he built the existing two-storey store on the east corner of Railway and Willow, which included a Home Oil gas bar.

Ruby (1916–73), their only child, married Harold Pennington (1909–82), and the couple purchased the store in 1945, but John remained as postmaster. Holding the post until his death, he had received an overdue 25-year service medal the prior year. Jane remained to become a 49-year resident.

In 1952, the Pennington store was enlarged to over 1,200 feet and 30 new boxes added to a modernized post-office. Harold was postmaster 1946, and 1957–63. At this time, the town had two stores and a poolroom. In 1961, Jane, the eldest Pennington daughter, married George Pacholok (1933–2000). Two years later, when the couple took over the Pennington store, Harold & Ruby Pennington, with their daughters Judy and Jackie, moved to Prince George, and Jane became postmaster 1963–66. In 1966, after 52 years in the same family, a series of owners followed.

John & Adeline (Adelaine?) B. (c.1879–1949) Crawford built their hotel on the north corner of Railway and Willow, in Block 44 (now a children's playground). In March 1914, there were plans for two modern hotels, one of which was to be three storeys. The GTP planned a 130-foot-by-130-foot hotel on the west corner at where the surveyed straight River Ave. would have intersected Willow St., in Block 47. By April, a hotel (assumedly the Crawford) and a rooming house were under construction. Prior to these ventures, on the northwest side of Willow, in Block 45 (Gwen-Reta), an establishment called the Willow Hotel sought a liquor licence.

The Crawford hotel underwent extensive alterations in 1921, which added an adjoining building, with the former section rented as living quarters. From 1923, Adeline, not John was the proprietor. Under the name of the Willow River Hotel, Patrick Foisy applied for a liquor licence, and then as the Crawford Hotel, John H. Crawford reapplied, but his name is not mentioned after 1934. A grocery store and barbershop operated on the premises, but a fire in 1946 razed the buildings, sparing only a warehouse to its northwest. A BC Forest Service pumper crew from Giscome could only prevent the blaze from spreading to surrounding properties. In 1948, work commenced on a complete rebuild of the hotel. The following year, Adeline Crawford died intestate in her small store under circumstances that initially appeared suspicious. The construction project never proceeded and the framing collapsed. The Official Administrator disposed of her extensive rural and township real estate holdings.

A two-storey residence on the corner of Railway and Coonsey had its own history. It served successively as the A.E. Brown post-office and store, private dwelling (Raines' residence for a period), community hall (opened 1925), and private dwelling for Mrs. Crawford after the fire. The building was moved to the main street in the mid-1930s. When torn down in 1955 by new owner John Newsome, it was one of the few remaining buildings from 1915.

In various eras, Mr. Calhoon, Ralph McVoy (inside the Crawford store), and Mike Chorney operated barbershops. The latter also had a bathhouse for his lumber industry clientele.

=== Education ===
Mr. Allen conducted the first school in a tent. William Walter Charles O'Neil was the inaugural teacher at the first official school, a one-roomed log building opened in 1915 on the south corner of Lee and Coonsey. Fundraising for furnishings occurred later. In 1921, the building was upgraded, but suffered some damage in a 1945 fire. During the 1930s, student numbers were about 45–50. The second school, which replaced it, was a two-roomed building with basement, on the east corner of Gwen and Willow, where the Newsome store was formerly located. Opening in 1948, a further classroom was added six years later. In 1957, fire damage closed the school for six weeks. In 1962, a stucco exterior was added, the roof repaired and an oil-burning furnace installed.

Enrolment for 1945–51 in Grades 1–8 was 30–56, 1952 in Grades 1–9 was 62, 1953–57 in Grades 1–8 was 52–67, 1958–60 in Grades 1–6 was 50–54, 1961–62 in Grades 1–7 was 57–63, 1963 in Grades 1–6 was 57, and 1964 in Grades 1–2 was 29. For Grade 9 or above, students attended senior high school in Prince George. From 1958, insufficient space meant higher elementary grades attended Giscome Superior. From 1964, bussing existed to Giscome for lower grades and Prince George for high school. The school closed in 1965. School District 57 disposed of the surplus school site in 1984. From 2010, parents petitioned for a new Willow River school to replace Giscome, which suffered structural problems, but the rebuilt facility remained at Giscome.

=== Social & Religion ===
From its beginning, surrounding communities were invited to the regular social and dance evenings. The 1918 population estimate was a 100. By 1920, only nine families remained. The population was 150 by 1927.

In 1920, Rev. Henry Raines (1869–1957), a church-planting Baptist preacher, arrived with daughters Bessie and widowed Martha (Mattie) Short (1892–1973), and her daughter Mary. Mattie Blair (1885–1974), and her child Naomi, accompanied them from Illinois. Two years later, Henry opened a church building on the south corner of Muriel and Willow that he financed and built himself. Formerly, Sunday services were held in the school. Henry and Mattie married in 1923. Although there had been a little-used cemetery north of the town, in 1938, he secured a new official site near the mineral springs, west of the current highway and south of the railway tracks. These bodies were exhumed in 1969 and reburied in Prince George.

Holding services in the school were the Lutherans during the 1920/30s, the United Church during the 1940s, and the Brethren in the 1950s.

Over the years, 90 percent of the town's children passed through the Baptist Sunday school. At 84, Raines still conducted some services, having never drawn a salary from the church. He collaborated with the Salvation Army from Prince George, who would both be involved in the Baptist services as well as hold their own in the church building during the 1940s and 1950s. Renamed the Willow River Gospel Chapel, the old building was too small by 1970. Fundraising, volunteer labour, and using materials from the demolished community hall, the new building opened on the east corner of Muriel and Coonsey in 1972. Subsequent pastors averaged three-year terms, and a loan financed the trailer acquired for their accommodation. A Pioneer Girls club operated. In 1982, the 82-member congregation paid off the $13,000 mortgage. Pastors from Village Missions served from 1969. A small congregation currently exists.

Of the two key women's groups in existence, the League (WRHL), formed in 1949, revolved around an evangelical Christian core, and the Ladies Auxiliary (LA), formed in 1953, followed a more conservative position. The League conducted an annual service in the church. The League's weekly meetings focused upon supporting missions work and providing an opportunity to acknowledge milestones in members' lives. The group held fundraising events to benefit the disadvantaged both locally and overseas. Although the women were supportive of the Salvation Army aims, only one or two were actual members of this denomination. The LA also fundraised for community causes, hosted social events, and supported the Scout cub activities. The PTA, active for several years, was dissolved into this group, and the advantage of combined League and Auxiliary activities noted.

A new community hall opened in 1949 on the south corner of Reta and Willow. The furnace, installed almost a decade later, ameliorated wintertime use of the building. Social events were held for teenagers in the hall or school. In 1970, the dilapidated hall was demolished, and the population estimate of 500 seems overstated. People had dispersed after the mills closed and the remaining residents drove to jobs in Giscome. The Willow River Recreation Association (WRRA) was incorporated in 1971. The school building continued to be used for social events such as dancing. In need of major maintenance, demolition became the only option.

Opened in 1980, the small hall at 49 Willow St. (diagonally opposite the general store) has been generally referred to as the community or seniors' house. The WRRA organized the homecoming reunion, held August 4–6, 1984, for former residents, from which the book of memories was compiled. The RDFFG implemented house numbering in 1989. The deeply divisive 1993 referendum to build a larger more functional community hall was narrowly defeated. In 2012, the Willow River East Line Activity Centre, a combined community hall and gymnasium, was promised as a replacement for the existing 450-square-foot hall. This facility was instead awarded to Giscome after the decision to rebuild the school there.

=== Crime, Calamity & Safety Measures ===
In May 1913, two surveyors of the township drowned in a canoeing accident on the Fraser reef below the Willow. Along the Upper Fraser River, this location, the Giscome Rapids, the Grand Canyon, and the Goat River Rapids, were extremely dangerous and believed to be the scenes of numerous drownings. In July, a scow loaded with 17 tons of rails and dump cars, was cut free from its moorings at Willow River and drifted downstream until it was deliberately maneuvered onto a sandbar 30 miles (48 km) north of Quesnel.

During 1914–16, the jail/police barracks, on the south corner of Gwen and Willow, stationed BC Provincial Police Constable Henry N. Wood (1889–1967) & his bride Fanny Eleanor Bulman (1888–1963). After his transfer to Vanderhoof, the four-roomed cottage became a residence.

Albert (c.1873–1931) and Rose (1876–1968) White were residents during the 1910s. Albert was a logging foreman. Their children were Beatrice (c.1903–?), C. Vernon (c.1905–?), Alberta May (c.1908–?), and Emmett (1915–94). Starting the fire with gasoline one 1915 morning, Albert caused an explosion. Rose escaped with the three older children. The Golders rushed to help. While Eliza was rescuing baby Emmett from the burning house, John was working to save Albert's life, applying his veterinarian experience.

Marif Nazarek (c.1891–1918) and her newborn died within days during the influenza epidemic.

Murray Campbell (c.1929–1933) drowned in the Fraser opposite the Willow confluence.

Three-year-old James (Jimmy) Laidlaw (1950–53) drowned in the frigid waters of the Willow River. In 1958, Cindy Lou McLane went missing one morning. Despite a seven-day search by thousands of volunteers and a $500 reward, the two-year-old was never found. During the 1960s, Lawrence Woiken (c.1941–60) drowned while wading with friends in the river. Bruce Colebank, 17, who lost a hand when playing with dynamite, received a prosthetic. A truck fatally injured two-year-old Jimmy Walker (1965–67). Ralph Suvee (1946–66) was posthumously awarded the Queens Commendation for Brave Conduct for his attempt to rescue a victim from a well near the Upper Fraser Road/Yellowhead intersection. The family settling in 1960, his parents became longtime residents.

Many people lost their possessions when their houses burned to the ground. Despite ongoing property losses, a 1989 referendum to form a volunteer fire department failed, as did the proposal for a water connection, the following year. In 1994, arson was suspected in the burning of two vacant buildings. By the early 1990s, a volunteer fire brigade had been formed, but a fire hall was not built until 2004. Destroyed by fire four years later, it was rebuilt to facilitate the 15-member brigade. While properties continued to burn to the ground, the firefighters were able to keep the blazes from spreading. A 2011 referendum approved a centralized sewer and water system.

In 1999, the trailer, where children and teenagers had been drugged in making child pornography, burned to the ground. Crystal Dianne Henricks, in custody since her arrest 26 months earlier, was sentenced to 13 years. Reduced to seven years on appeal, she was released in 2004. Her common-law husband, James Darren Bennett, who received an indeterminate sentence, was denied parole in 2015. Calvin James Grexton, a co-accused, received three years.

Accidental rifle discharges at residences killed Ted Garth Burtnyk (1929–74) and Kevin William Olson (1963–78). Jennifer Doherty (1978–82) drowned in a septic tank.

With conditions similar to 1946, locals pumped out their basements when the Willow River flooded in 1997.

=== Post-1940s Forestry Industries ===
During World War II, the largest producer in the British Empire of birch veneer plywood for building the "Mosquito" warplane was the Pacific Veneer Co. of New Westminster. Willow River shipped numerous railway carloads of birch logs to this factory. In 1943, Pacific Veneer upgraded the railway siding. The Willow River Sawmill, west of the railway bridge, which had run intermittently for three years, was completely rebuilt with a new planer. J. Henry Houle (1888–1983) was lead partner in this 25,000-foot capacity mill opened in 1941. Operating at capacity the prior year, and governed by the Timber Control Board, the sawmill handled the strong demand for even hemlock and spruce. However, the increased labour force put pressure on the housing supply. In 1946, Ben McNally, the foreman, lost an arm in a mill accident. Lesser injuries occurred throughout subsequent years.

By 1950, Percy Church from Ferndale ran two sawmills and a planer. The mills were located at Ferndale and three miles (4.8 km) north of Willow River, and the planer at the northwest end of Railway Ave. A falling tree killed logger Thomas (Tom) Sather (1905–51). In 1954, a new dry kiln was added. In 1958, the company dismantled and relocated their sawmill operations to north of Mile 98 (McGregor).

During the 1940s and 1950s, the Geddes planer mill operated on the east side of the north–south section of Arnett Rd (near the Willow River hill incline on the former highway). A 1957 fire at the McDermid & Lofting planer mill, located about three miles (4.8 km) to the south, caused $10,000 damage. A number of smaller sawmills existed in the area until the early 1960s.

A falling limb fatally crushed resident logger R. William (Bill) Walker (1920–71) in the vicinity.

=== Road Transport ===
Although the wagon road from Prince George via Six Mile (Tabor) Lake reached the west bank of the Willow in 1915, the actual bridge into the township was not constructed until the 1922/23 winter. It aligned with the north–south section of Arnett Rd, this being the then access route. The road to Giscome, which then aligned with Gwen Ave, was not completed until 1926. The regular Prince George-Willow River-Giscome motor services for freight and passengers appear short lived. In 1950, the river channel was dredged to redirect spring floodwaters from the northeast bridge approach, and the prior bridge was replaced by a wooden truss one (at the existing location) in 1957.

Throughout the 1960s and 1970s, Prince George Transit ran special buses three times a week between Prince George and McGregor, which assumedly also stopped in Willow River. Near impassable in spring and fall, the final seven miles (11 km) of the road from Prince George to three miles (4.8 km) beyond Willow River was finally paved in 1968. The remaining section to Giscome received light paving during the 1970s. Railway and Coonsey were paved in the early 1980s. Initially twice monthly, then weekly, the handyDART service for seniors and the disabled discontinued in 1987. The bridge, upgraded in 1992, collapsed a decade later under the weight of a loaded truck-trailer. Opened to limited traffic after three weeks, and unrestricted traffic after five weeks, the temporary single lane steel bridge remains in use. In response to damages sustained during the spring runoff, the pilings and approaches were upgraded in 2009.

=== Electricity, Broadcast Transmissions & Communications Devices ===
Unless operated by the agent, the early telegraph office may have relied upon automatic printing apparatus, because there was no dispatcher at this station. By 1921, the railway was stringing telephone wires as far as Hutton, to connect Willow River with the outside world and mills and farms along the route. By 1922, a telephone had replaced the telegraph. Significant gaps, which remained into the following years, prompted demands for lines separate from the railway's ones. Party lines ended for Willow River in 1966, when BC Tel installed 50 direct-dial phones.

The Percy Church planer mill provided electricity to the company houses, while some residents installed their own generators. In 1961, Jane Newsome turned on the first light when BC Hydro extended distribution lines from Tabor Lake. Streetlights came in 1988, after a referendum the previous year.

CKPG-TV, of Prince George, commenced with partial programming in 1961. A new transmitter, installed on Mount Tabor in 1964, improved reception for Willow River and Giscome.
