= McBride Secondary School =

McBride Secondary

Location
- 1300 - 2nd Avenue; McBride, British Columbia, V0J 2E0; Canada
- Coordinates: 53°17′50″N 120°9′50″W

Information
- School type: Public, high school
- School board: School District 57 Prince George
- School number: 5757075
- Principal: Jason Schwartz
- Grades: 8-12
- Language: English
- Team name: Mustangs
- Website: mcbsweb.sd57.bc.ca

McBride Secondary is a public high school in McBride, part of School District 57 Prince George.

== History ==
=== Overview ===
Fraser School, which opened in 1913, was soon inadequate for the increasing student numbers. Construction of a new two-room schoolhouse began in 1916. Opened in 1917, the school comprised both elementary and high school grades. However, many students boarded in main centres elsewhere to attend larger high schools. The McBride school went to grade 11. Addressing a need, grade 12 was introduced using correspondence course material for 1939–1940. Assumedly in subsequent years, the more traditional methodology was used. The elementary grades relocated to the Legion Hall, but in 1942, swapped with the secondary students to better utilize the respective spaces.

The 1946 implementation of the 1945 Cameron Report into BC school financing and administration, which ushered in centralized larger school districts, included the creation of School District #58 (McBride) (SD58). When the new high school building opened in 1948, the immediate need was housing the elementary grades, whose building had recently been destroyed by fire. Consequently, the high school returned to the Legion Hall, and a room at the rear of Woodley's Garage, and the elementary students occupied the new four-room building.

In 1950, a dormitory opened to board students from a catchment area stretching from Dome Creek to Valemount. For two decades, until the highway north was completed, student boarders would arrive each term by passenger rail, or boat during railway strikes. In 1953, the new junior high building opened, and the various temporary classroom accommodation was no longer needed. Added were four classrooms in 1955, and a comparable space in 1969. Prior to 1963, the elementary and secondary schools shared a principal.

In 1970, SD 58 merged into School District 57 Prince George, and the SD 58 board was dissolved. The new enlarged school district matches the boundaries of the Regional District of Fraser-Fort George. The redundant McBride dormitory became an art and music facility. A rebuilt school opened in 1990, with a theatre and full-size gym. In the past, grades 11 and 12 have not always been offered. Enrolment for 1950 was 95, 1960 was 165, 1970 was 177, 1980 was 162, 1990 was 110, 2000 was 127, 2010 was 106, and 2020 was 60.

Technology has snowballed distance education. Courses have been completed on school grounds, or at home, which avoids taking an often long, arduous school bus ride. This choice has further reduced the McBride Secondary population, which in turn has increased the gap between the range of programs available at a city high school and a small rural one like McBride. The growth of independent schools has also been a factor. The board has considered combining the secondary and elementary schools. However, the plan was shelved, because each plays a prominent role in the community, and the unfunded costs to retrofit the high school were prohibitive. The high school is well known for their Star athlete Ian Monroe, who is currently in Germany playing in the DEL.

In 2016, a $270,000 upgrade of the school boiler increased energy efficiency.

=== Academic achievements ===
In 2010, Amy von der Gonna received the $2,500 Prince of Wales Scholarship, the most prestigious award in SD 57.

=== Sports achievements ===
The wrestling team placed third at the BC Summer Games, and sixth at the BC Provincial Championships. Two participants later competed in the Canadian National Championships. The boys' snowboarding team won the British Columbia high school ski and snowboarding zonal championship in March 2008. The senior boys basketball team reached single 'A' provincials in 2010 and 2011, placing 12th and 14th respectively.
