= School District 57 Prince George =

School district in British Columbia, Canada

Location
- Prince George Fraser-Fort George Canada

District information
- Superintendent: Jameel Aziz
- Chair of the board: Craig Brennan
- Schools: 41
- Budget: CA$172.7 million

Students and staff
- Students: 12,894

Other information
- Website: www.sd57.bc.ca

School District 57 Prince George (SD 57) is a school district in central British Columbia that encompasses urban Prince George, its surroundings, and the outlying communities of McBride and Valemount to the southeast, and Mackenzie to the north.

== History ==
=== Overview ===
Land developers organized and sponsored the first schools within Prince George. By 1914, one high and three elementary schools existed. Within the area of what would become SD 57, the establishment of separate school districts (usually comprising a single school), totalled 9 in 1911–1920, 17 in 1921–1930, and 11 in 1931–1940. During the Great Depression, centralization increased because local boards abrogated their responsibilities, forcing the installation of official trustees and creating larger administrative units.

SD 57 & Fraser-Fort George
- Larger communities

- Location in British Columbia

Attracting and retaining qualified rural teachers proved difficult. Factors included salaries, scathing inspectors, isolation, community factions, no running water, no electricity, inadequate heat, teaching multiple grades, and sometimes an expectation to organize the various children's social activities for the community at large. Rural schools were dependent upon a smaller and volatile local tax base for funding. When an economic downturn, fire, or depleted accessible timber, closed a sawmill (the primary employer in most rural communities), workers relocated, student numbers dropped, and the tax base collapsed.

Rural school buildings were usually rudimentary, and many in a poor state of repair. Equipment and supplies were limited. Consequently, rural students, receiving the barest elementary programs, lacked educational opportunities, and few progressed to a secondary school offered only by a main centre.

The 1946 implementation of the 1945 Cameron Report into BC school financing and administration created centralized larger districts. Benefits to rural schools were a broader tax base, to Prince George schools an augmentation of existing infrastructure, and to all schools an increase in provincial funding from 30 to 50 percent. The earlier municipal districts provided no guidance as to setting boundaries, because many were quite small, and 90 percent of the province was unorganized. The new Prince George school district boundaries were equidistant between Quesnel southward, Vanderhoof westward, and at Penny southeastward. On the disbanding of local boards, the former Prince George one, comprising members of civic and economic stature, became the interim board. The elected 1948 board comprised four city and three rural representatives, reaffirming some degree of local control.

The new board did not operate with complete autonomy, but had to avail itself of the experience, training, and knowledge of local inspectors of schools, who represented the province. The latter, who had been regarded as faultfinders by local trustees, became mentors aligned with the centralized trustees. The board became a buffer between local residents and the province, and the inspectors were freed from petty management issues.

Burgeoning student numbers throughout the 1950s saw massive increases in teacher recruitment and classroom capacity. Many new schools served residential development along the new highways north and west. However, by the mid-1950s, building remote rural schools rarely occurred because of maintenance challenges, and from the late 1950s, numerous schools closed as mills closed.

In 1970, SD 58 McBride merged into SD 57, and its board dissolved. The new enlarged school district matches the boundaries of the Regional District of Fraser-Fort George.

=== Board of trustees and superintendents ===
Chair	Period	Superintendent (formerly supervising principal)	Period
H.A. Moffat	January 1946 – December 1946	Ray Williston	January 1946 – June 1949
Gordon E. Styles	January 1947 – December 1947	Ray Williston	January 1946 – June 1949
W. (William) Rees	January 1948 – December 1949	Ray Williston	January 1946 – June 1949
Bob Anderson	January 1950 – December 1950	Jack Beech	June 1949 – September 1954?
H.A. Moffat	January 1951 – December 1951	Jack Beech	June 1949 – September 1954?
Jack Nicholson	January 1952 – December 1953	Jack Beech	June 1949 – September 1954?
Robert Range	January 1954 – December 1958	?	
Robert Range	January 1954 – December 1958	K.F. (Ken) Alexander	mid-1956 – July 1961
R.G. (Ray) Atkinson	January 1959 – December 1962	J.M. Phillipson	August 1961 – July 1964
James Elliott	January 1963 – December 1966	D.P. (Dave) Todd	July 1964 – June 1976
Jean Kellett	January 1967 – December 1970	D.P. (Dave) Todd	July 1964 – June 1976
Jim Lang	January 1971 – November 1972	D.P. (Dave) Todd	July 1964 – June 1976
Joan MacLatchy	November 1972 – December 1977	D.P. (Dave) Todd	July 1964 – June 1976
Bruce Strachan	January 1978 – December 1979	Carl Daneliuk	July 1976 – April 1979
Cliff Dezell	January 1980 – December 1981	Alvin Myhre	April 1979 – August 1984
Gordon Ingalls	December 1981 – December 1996	Jim Imrich	August 1984 – June 1995
Shirley Bond	December 1996 – December 2000	Phil Redmond	June 1995 – August 2001
Bill Christie	December 2000 – June 2007	Dick Chambers	August 2001 – July 2006
Lyn Hall	June 2007 – December 2011	Brian Pepper	July 2006 – December 2015
Sharel Warrington	December 2011 – December 2014	Brian Pepper	July 2006 – December 2015
Tony Cable	December 2014 – December 2016	Brian Pepper	July 2006 – December 2015
Tim Bennett	December 2016 –	Marilyn Marquis-Forster	August 2016 – May 2019
		Anita Richardson	January 2020 –

=== Schools ===
School	^{A}	Location	Grades	Established Re-opened		Closure	
Airport Elementary	^{a}	Prince George		1948		1965	
Aleza Lake Elementary		Aleza Lake		1921		1964	
Aurora Elementary	^{b}	Prince George		1957		1980	^{b}
Austin Road Elementary		Prince George		1967		2010	
Baldy Mountain Elementary		CFS Baldy Hughes/Clear Lake		1958		1965	
Bear Lake Elementary	^{c}	Bear Lake		1955	^{c}	2006	
Beaverly Elementary		Prince George	K–7	1919; 1930; 1966		1925; 1942 current	
Bednesti Elementary		Bednesti		1930 or 1931		1933	
Blackburn Elementary	^{d}	Prince George	K–7	1960	^{d}	current	
Blackburn Jr. Secondary		Prince George		1967		2002	
Bonnet Hill Elementary		Prince George		1952		1965	
Buckhorn Elementary		Prince George	K–7	1951		current	
Bud Lake Elementary		Bud Lake		1950		1955	
Cale Creek Elementary		Cale Creek		1931		1940	
Camp Creek Elementary		Woodpecker		1931 or 1932		1942	
Carney Hill Elementary	^{e}	Prince George	K–7	1966	^{e}	2010	
Central Fort George Traditional	^{f}	Prince George	K–7	1910	^{f}	2011	
Centre for Learning Alternatives SD57	^{g}	Prince George		2007		current	
Chief Lake Elementary		Chief Lake		1914; 1933 or 1934		1922; 1956	
College Heights Elementary		Prince George	K–7	1971		current	
College Heights Secondary	^{h}	Prince George	8–12	1977	^{h}	current	
Connaught Jr. Secondary		Prince George		1958		1979	
Cranbrook Mills Elementary		Cranbrook Mills		1932		1958	
Crescent Lake Elementary		Crescent Lake		1936 or 1937		1959	
Crescent Spur Elementary	^{B}	Crescent Spur		1949		1971	
D.P. Todd Secondary		Prince George	8–12	1977	^{j}	current	
Dewey Elementary		Dewey		1922		1925	
Dome Creek Elementary	^{B}	Dome Creek		1918; 1946		1943; 2001	
Duchess Park Secondary		Prince George	8–12	1958		current	
Dunster Elementary	^{B} ^{k}	Dunster	K–7	1916	^{k}	2010	
Edgewood Elementary		Prince George	K–7	1974		current	
Ferndale Elementary		Ferndale		1930 or 1931		1960	
Finlay Forks Elementary		Finlay Forks		1967		1971	
Foothills Elementary		Prince George	K–7	1974		current	
Foreman Elementary		Foreman	1–6	1962		1969	
Fort George Canyon Elementary		Fort George Canyon		1932		1935	
Fraser Flats Elementary		Fraser Flats		1926 or 1927		1952	
Fraserview Elementary		Prince George	1–6	1956		1978	
Giscome Elementary		Giscome	K–7	1916 or 1919		2025	
Gladstone Elementary	^{l}	Prince George		1976	^{l}	2002	
Glenview Elementary	^{m}	Prince George	K–7	1973	^{m}	current	
Haldi Road Elementary		Prince George	^{n}	1978	^{n}	2002	
Hansard Elementary		Hansard		1939; 1952		1947; 1958	
Hart Highlands Elementary	^{o}	Prince George	K–7	1975	^{o}	current	
Hart Highway Elementary		Prince George		1952		2002	
Harwin Elementary	^{p}	Prince George	K–7	1955	^{p}	current	
Heather Park Elementary	^{r}	Prince George	K–7	2000		current	
Heritage Elementary		Prince George	K–7	1976	^{s}	current	
Highglen Elementary	^{t}	Prince George		1970		2015	^{t}
Highland Traditional Elementary		Prince George		1967		2003	
Hixon Elementary	^{u}	Hixon	K–7	1922		current	
Hutton Elementary		Hutton		1919		1942	
Island Cache Elementary		Prince George		1955		1972	
Isle Pierre Elementary		Isle Pierre		1929 or 1933		1965	
John McInnis Jr. Secondary		Prince George	8–10	1972		2010	
Shas Ti Kelly Road Secondary	^{w}	Prince George	9–12	1957	^{w}	current	
Kerry Lake Elementary	^{x}	Kerry Lake		1951	^{x}	1965	
King George V Elementary	^{y}	Prince George		1914	^{y}	2003	
École Lac des Bois	^{α}	Prince George	K–7	2010	^{α}	current	
Lakewood Elementary		Prince George		1973		2003	
Lakewood Jr. Secondary	^{α}	Prince George	7–10	1968		2010	
Longworth Elementary		Longworth		1921		1939	
Longworth South Elementary		Longworth		1927		1939	
Longworth (United Rural) Elementary		Longworth		1939		1966	
Mackenzie Elementary		Mackenzie		1966		2010	
Mackenzie Secondary		Mackenzie	7–12	1971		current	
Malaspina Elementary		Prince George	K–7	1979	^{β}	current	
McBride Centennial Elementary	^{B} ^{δ}	McBride	K–7	1913		current	
McBride Secondary	^{B} ^{ε}	McBride	8–12	1939	^{ε}	current	
McLeod Lake Elementary		McLeod Lake		1957		2003	
Meadow Elementary		Prince George		1979	^{ζ}	2003	
Millar Addition Elementary		Prince George		1956		1986	
Morfee Elementary	^{η}	Mackenzie	K–6	1973	^{η}	current	
Mountain View Elementary		Mackenzie		1973		2002	
Mud River Elementary		Mud River	1–8	1920		1965	
Nechako North Elementary		Prince George		1956		2002	
Ness Lake Elementary		Ness Lake		1935 or 1937		1942	
Newlands Elementary		Newlands		1915; 1926		1916; 1958	
Newlands North Elementary		Newlands		1929		1934	
Nukko Lake Elementary		Prince George	K–7	1956		current	
Nusdeh Yoh Elementary	^{θ}	Prince George	K–7	2010	^{θ}	current	
Peden Hill Elementary		Prince George	K–7	1956		current	
Penny Elementary		Penny		1920; 1929; 1977		1925; 1971; 1985	
Pilot (Pylot) Mountain Elementary		Pilot Mountain		1948		1959	
Pineview Elementary		Prince George	K–7	1922 ? 1958		1924 ? current	
Pinewood Elementary		Prince George	K–7	1976	^{λ}	current	
Polaris Montessori Elementary	^{t}	Prince George	K–7	2015	^{t}	current	
Prince George Secondary	^{μ}	Prince George	8–12	1918	^{μ}	current	
Quinson Elementary		Prince George	K–7	1962		current	
Red Rock Elementary		Red Rock	K–7	1955		2001	
Reid Lake Elementary		Reid Lake		1924 or 1926		1984	
Ron Brent Elementary	^{ξ}	Prince George	K–7	1946	^{ξ}	current	
Salmon River Elementary		Salmon Valley		1919		1930	
Salmon Valley Elementary		Salmon Valley	K–6	1935		2010	
Seymour Elementary		Prince George		1963		2002	
Shady Valley Elementary	^{π}	Prince George	K–6	1956	^{π}	2010	
Shelley Elementary		Shelley		1923 or 1924		1965	
Sinclair Mills Elementary		Sinclair Mills		1926 or 1927		1984	
South Fort George Elementary		Prince George		1910	^{ρ}	2003	
Southridge Elementary		Prince George	K–7	1994	^{ς}	current	
Springwood Elementary		Prince George	K–7	1975 2017		2009 current	
Spruceland Elementary		Prince George	K–7	1966	^{σ}	current	
St. Marie's Lake Elementary		St. Marie Lake		1961		1965	
Stone Creek Elementary		Stone Creek		1921; 1940		1927; 1984	
Strathnaver Elementary		Strathnaver	1–8	1929; 1959		1955; 1965	
Summit Lake Elementary		Summit Lake		1948		1965	
Sylvan Glade Elementary		Vivian Lake		1931; 1947; 1958		1943; 1953; 1963	
Tabor Creek Elementary		Tabor Creek		1925		1961	
Tay Elementary		Summit Lake		1959		1963	
Telachick Elementary		Telachick		1954		1964	
Tête Jaune/TJ S Elementary	^{B}	Tête Jaune		1911; 1934		1914; 1976	
Thompson Elementary		Prince George		1927		1946	
Upper Fraser Elementary		Upper Fraser		1948		1999	
Valemount Elementary	^{B}	Valemount	K–7	1935	^{χ}	current	
Valemount Secondary	^{B} ^{ψ}	Valemount	8–12	1956	^{ψ}	current	
Van Bien Elementary		Prince George	K–7	1967		current	
Vanway Elementary		Prince George	K–7	1961		current	
Westlake Elementary		West Lake		1951		1963	
Westwood Elementary		Prince George	K–7	1969		current	
Wildwood Elementary		Prince George		1969		2003	
Willow River Elementary		Willow River		1915		1965	
Winton Elementary	^{ω}	Prince George	9–12	1965		1974	^{ω}
Woodpecker Elementary		Woodpecker	1–8	1923		1950	
Wright Creek Elementary		Salmon Valley		1962		1964	

^A . Includes schools which had existed prior to 1945 within the initial boundaries of SD 57 Prince George, and excludes SD 58 McBride schools closed prior to 1970.
^B . Formerly SD 58 McBride.
^a . A.k.a Airport Hill.
^b . Integrated into the school district in Sep 1959 to be primary section of Winton School.
^c . Called Hart (Heart) Lake; in 1965 renamed Bear Lake.
^d . Called Blackburn Road initially.
^e . Called Van Bow initially; accommodated at Connaught elementary. renamed Carney Hill; Feb 1968 building opening; Aboriginal Choice assumed building.
^f . In 1910, one-room log building built; later frame building; in 1916 replaced by two-room building known as Millar Addition on Queensway Ave; in 1963 reconstructed; a.k.a. Fort George Central; in 1998, became a traditional choice school.
^g . Former John McInnis Jr. Secondary building.
^h . Accommodated at John McInnis prior to Feb 1978 building opening.
^j . Accommodated at Lakewood Jr. Sec. prior to Feb 1978 building opening.
^k . In 1998 became a choice school and renamed Dunster Fine Arts School. In 2010, Dunster Fine Arts School Society acquired property.
^l . Accommodated at College Heights elementary prior to Apr 1977 building opening.
^m . Known as Birchwood during early construction phase; relocatable building soon moved; in 1975 permanent building.
^n . Accommodated at Vanway elementary prior to Oct 1979 building opening.
^o . Accommodated at Austin Rd. prior to May 1977 building opening.
^p . Called South Central; in 1959, renamed Harwin.
^r . In 2010, middle school became elementary.
^s . Accommodated at Highglen elementary. prior to Jun 1977 building opening.
^t . In 1985, Montessori program established at Highglen elementary; after 2013 fire relocated to former Gladstone elementary building; in 2015 renamed Polaris Montessori.
^u . Called Canyon Creek; in 1958, renamed Hixon Superior; in 1965, became elementary.
^w . In 1957, opened as elementary; in 1961, became elementary/junior high; in 1967, became solely a junior high.
^x . Called Mile 4 at the Stevens and Rahn sawmill; in 1956, renamed when mill relocated about 30 miles to Kerry Lake.
^y . Called Prince George City elementary or Prince George public school, opened in three cottages on Vancouver St; in 1916, four-room building opened on Winnipeg St; in 1929 renamed King George V elementary.
^α . École Lac des Bois assumed former Lakewood Junior Secondary building.
^β . Accommodated at various schools. prior to Oct 1979 building opening.
^δ . Refer McBride Secondary; c. 1970, renamed McBride Centennial elementary.
^ε . Refer McBride Secondary.
^ζ . Accommodated at various schools. prior to Sep 1979 building opening.
^η . Completed spring 1973; relocatable building soon moved to be replaced by permanent building.
^θ . Former Carney Hill elementary building. Aboriginal Choice to 2012.
^λ . Accommodated at Westwood elementary. prior to Apr 1977 building opening.
^μ . Refer Prince George Secondary.
^ξ . From 1927 Millar Addition school used for overflow elementary students; in 1929 renamed Connaught; operated until about 1936. in 1946, reopened; in 1978, renamed Ron Brent elementary.
^π . Called McMillan Creek; immediately renamed Shady Valley.
^ρ . In 1910, a room rented; in 1913 new building opened.
^ς . Accommodated in portables at other schools prior to Jan 1994 building opening.
^σ . Accommodated at Quinson elementary. prior to May 1977 building opening.
^χ . School in adjacent Swift Creek 1916–35. Valemount opened in 1935.
^ψ . In 1956, elementary became a superior school offering to grade 10; in 1974 extended to grade 12.
^ω . In 1974, closed with integration of students into regular classes.

=== Enrolment ===
School	1910–11	1915–16	1920–21	1925–26	1930–31	1935–36	1940–41	1945–46	1950–51	1955–56	1960–61	1965–66	1970–71	1975–76	1980–81
Airport Elem.									30	24	26				
References/Grades									1–6	1–4	1–3				
Aleza Lake Elem.						18	18	28	28	36	40				
References/Grades			^{A}·^{Rept}·			1–8	1–7	1–8	1–8	1–8	1–8				
Austin Road Elem.													611	426	354
References/Grades													1–7	K–7	K–7
Baldy Mt. El. (Clear L.)										19	22				
References/Grades										1–7	1–7				
Bear Lk. El. (Hart L.)										15	14	147	139	127	79
References/Grades										1–6	1–7	1–7	1–7	K–7	K–7
Beaverly Elem.			16	closed		12	10	closed	closed	closed	closed	closed	306	356	330
References/Grades						1–8	1–9						1–7	K–7	K–7
Blackburn Elem.											145	763	515	410	352
References/Grades											1–6	1–10	1–7	K–7	K–7
Blackburn Jr. Sec.													390	487	361
References/Grades													8–10	8–10	8–10
Bonnet Hill Elem.										56	30				
References/Grades										1–6	1–2				
Buckhorn Elem.										42	88	196	181	246	207
References/Grades										1–6	1–6	1–7	1–7	K–7	K–7
Bud Lake Elem.									13	12					
References/Grades									1–5	3–8					
Cale Creek Elem.						8	8								
References/Grades						2–7	4–8								
Camp Creek Elem.						13	9								
References/Grades						1–9	2–9								
Carney Hill Elem.													484	606	509
References/Grades													1–7	K–7	K–7
Central Ft. George		76	52			21	34	25	65	239	275	615	517	312	215
References/Grades		^{A}·^{Rept}·	^{A}·^{Rept}·	^{A}·^{Rept}·		1–8	1–8	1–6	1–4	1–6	1–6	1–7	1–7	K–7	K–7
Chief Lake Elem.		11		closed	closed	12	13	21	29	28					
References/Grades		^{A}·^{Rept}·				1–6	1–8	1–8	1–8	1–8					
College Heights El.														583	442
References/Grades														K–7	K–7
College Heights Sec.															719
References/Grades															8–12
Connaught Jr. Sec.											421	454	535	508	
References/Grades											7–9	8–10	8–10	8–10	
Cranbrook Mills El.						13	16	15	17	9					
References/Grades						1–6	1–8	1–8	1–8	3–8					
Crescent Lake Elem.							16	closed year	18	18					
References/Grades							1–9	closed year	2–8	1–7					
Crescent Spur Elem.									15	27	19	48	4		
References/Grades									1–7	2–8	1–7	1–7	1–2		
D.P. Todd Sec.															722
References/Grades															8–12
Dome Creek Elem.						12	12	closed	13	27	38	15	18	8	15
References/Grades				^{A}·^{Rept}·		1–7	1–9		1–6	1–7	1–7	1–7	1–7	1–7	K–7
Duchess Park Sec.											721	671	1,206	1,245	1,066
References/Grades											7–9	8–9	8–10	8–12	8–12
Dunster Elem.		13				21	16	15	18	27	43	56	50	40	30
References/Grades		^{A}·^{Rept}·				1–9	1–9	1–8	1–8	1–7	1–8	1–7	1–7	K–7	K–7
Edgewood Elem.															143
References/Grades															K–7
Ferndale Elem.						10	11	closed a year	19	14					
References/Grades					^{A}·^{Rept}·	1–8	1–7	closed a year	1–7	1–7					
Finlay Forks Elem.													25		
References/Grades													1–5		
Foothills Elem.														378	441
References/Grades														K–7	K–7
Foreman Elem.												19			
References/Grades												1–6			
Fraser Flats Elem.						13	closed	19	6						
References/Grades						1–9		1–7	2–9						
Fraserview Elem.											51	55	52	22	
References/Grades											1–6	1–6	1–6	1–6	
Giscome Elem.						47	20	61	82	105	176	186	183	104	74
References/Grades						1–8	5–9	1–8	1–8	1–8	1–10	1–7	1–7	K–7	K–7
Gladstone Elem.															312
References/Grades															K–7
Glenview Elem.														303	226
References/Grades														K–7	K–7
Haldi Road Elem.															80
References/Grades															K–7
Hansard Elem.							24	16	closed	11					
References/Grades							1–9	1–8		1–7					
Hart Highlands El.														102	266
References/Grades														1–7	K–7
Hart Highway Elem.										155	185	390	318	327	259
References/Grades										1–6	1–6	1–7	1–7	K–7	K–7
Harwin El. (S Central)										236	607	687	654	416	325
References/Grades										1–6	1–6	1–7	1–7	K–7	K–7
Heritage Elem.															387
References/Grades															K–6
Highglen Elem.													203	418	308
References/Grades													1–7	K–7	K–7
Highland Trad. Elem.													487	491	375
References/Grades													1–7	K–7	K–7
Hixon El. (Canyon Ck)						17	11	10	27	111	169	188	156	139	91
References/Grades						1–7	3–7	1–8	1–9	1–9	1–10	1–7	1–7	K–7	K–7
Hutton Elem.						11	9								
References/Grades						1–9	1–7								
Island Cache Elem.										63	65	71	28		
References/Grades										1–6	1–6	1–3	1		
Isle Pierre Elem.						12	7	closed a year	16	16	13				
References/Grades						1–8	1–8	closed a year	1–9	1–8	1–8				
John McInnis Jr. Sec.														646	484
References/Grades														8–10	8–10
Kelly Rd. Sec. (Elem.)											267	716	530	786	980
References/Grades											1–8	1–10	8–10	8–11	8–12
Kerry Lk. El. (Mile 4)										24	14				
References/Grades										1–7	1–8				
King Geo. V El.(PG)		165	271	364	417	352	304	332	488	297	299	546	488	394	260
References/Grades		^{A}·^{Rept}·	^{A}·^{Rept}·	^{A}·^{Rept}·	^{A}·^{Rept}·	1–8	1–8	1–6	1–6	1–6	1–6	1–7	K–7	K–7	K–7
Lakewood Elem.														425	411
References/Grades														K–7	K–7
Lakewood Jr. Sec.													847	820	586
References/Grades													8–10	8–10	8–10
Longworth Elem.						24									
References/Grades						1–8									
Longworth S Elem.						7									
References/Grades						3–8									
Longworth (U R) El.							15	10	10	10	13	8			
References/Grades							1–8	1–8	1–8	1–7	1–8	1–7			
Mackenzie Elem.													504	428	367
References/Grades													1–10	K–7	K–7
Mackenzie Sec.														500	515
References/Grades														8–12	8–12
Malaspina Elem.															355
References/Grades															K–7
McBride Cent. Elem.		56	85		20	70	61	67	139	213	198	250	322	254	208
References/Grades		^{A}·^{Rept}·	^{A}·^{Rept}·	^{A}·^{Rept}·	^{A}·^{Rept}·	1–12	1–8	1–7	1–7	1–7	1–7	1–7	K–7	K–7	K–7
McBride Sec.							15	22	79	98	125	146	177	181	162
References/Grades							9–12	8–11	8–12	8–12	8–12	8–12	8–12	8–12	8–12
McLeod Lake Elem.											20	80	55	49	44
References/Grades											1–8	1–7	1–6	K–5	K–7
Meadow Elem.															233
References/Grades															K–7
Millar Addition Elem.											103	134	108	79	54
References/Grades											1–3	1–3	1–3	K–3	K–3
Morfee Elem.														298	425
References/Grades														K–7	K–7
Mountain View Elem.														285	260
References/Grades														K–7	K–7
Mud River Elem.						10	13	7	7	9	15				
References/Grades						1–8	2–8	1–7	1–6	1–8	1–8				
Nechako N Elem.											57	135	196	518	264
References/Grades											1–6	1–7	1–7	K–7	K–7
Ness Lake Elem.						10	13								
References/Grades						1–7	1–8								
Newlands Elem.		17	closed	closed		9	15	27	14	14					
References/Grades		^{A}·^{Rept}·				1–7	1–8	1–8	1–8	1–8					
Newlands N Elem.															
References/Grades															
Nukko Lake Elem.											86	92	118	136	160
References/Grades											1–8	1–6	1–6	K–7	K–7
Peden Hill Elem.											173	388	475	368	268
References/Grades											1–6	1–7	1–7	K–7	K–7
Penny Elem.				closed		27	30	27	31	32	31	21	6	closed	8
References/Grades			^{A}·^{Rept}·			1–8	1–8	1–8	1–9	1–8	1–8	1–7	2–7		K–7
Pilot (Pylot) Mtn. El.									15	18					
References/Grades									1–8	1–5					
Pineview Elem.											57	75	260	358	311
References/Grades											1–6	1–5	1–7	K–7	K–7
Pinewood Elem.															276
References/Grades															K–7
Pr. Geo. Sec. (Byng)			25	59	76	114	142	321	508	1,010	573	1,103	1,599	1,882	1,642
References/Grades			^{A}·^{Rept}·	^{A}·^{Rept}·	^{A}·^{Rept}·	9–12	9–12	7–12	7–13	7–12	10–13	10–13	11–12	10–12	8–12
Quinson Elem.												719	644	520	398
References/Grades												1–7	1–7	K–7	K–7
Red Rock Elem.										18	23	43	34	33	46
References/Grades										1–6	1–4	1–6	1–6	1–6	K–7
Reid Lake Elem.						8	7	18	22	23	31	29	26	9	10
References/Grades				^{A}·^{Rept}·		2–8	1–6	1–8	1–9	1–8	1–8	1–7	1–6	1–4	K–3
Ron Brent (Connaught)									210	672	586	695	534	440	387
References/Grades									1–6	1–6	1–6	1–7	1–7	K–7	K–7
Salmon Riv./Vall. El.		40				15	17	13	12	18	25	53	51	66	72
References/Grades		^{A}·^{Rept}·				1–8	1–7	1–8	2–8	1–9	1–8	1–6	1–6	K–6	K–6
Seymour Elem.												553	458	342	230
References/Grades												1–7	1–7	K–7	K–7
Shady Valley Elem.											49	74	85	68	73
References/Grades											1–6	1–6	1–6	1–6	K–7
Shelley Elem.						36	20	15	13	21	35				
References/Grades						1–10	1–8	1–8	1–8	1–8	1–8				
Sinclair Mills Elem.						22	22	33	41	39	42	50	15	17	10
References/Grades						1–8	1–8	1–8	1–8	1–8	1–8	1–7	1–6	1–7	K–7
South Ft. Geo. Elem.	28	43				69	59	76	48	101	201	328	172	201	181
References/Grades	^{A}·^{Rept}·	^{A}·^{Rept}·		^{A}·^{Rept}·		1–8	1–8	1–6	1–4	1–6	1–6	1–7	1–7	K–7	K–7
Springwood Elem.														82	164
References/Grades														1–3	K–5
Spruceland Elem.													865	540	399
References/Grades													1–7	K–7	K–7
Stone Creek Elem.					closed	closed	9	21	19	23	44	63	34	29	22
References/Grades							1–6	1–8	1–8	1–7	1–6	1–6	1–6	1–6	1–6
Strathnaver Elem.						19	14	11	11	closed	30				
References/Grades						1–8	1–8	1–8	1–8		1–4				
Summit Lake Elem.									32	42	48				
References/Grades									1–8	1–8	1–8				
Sylvan Glade Elem.						14	16	closed	9	closed	15				
References/Grades						1–5	1–9		3–8		1–6				
Tabor Ck. (or Sth) Elem.						14	27	closed a year	39	19	24				
References/Grades				^{A}·^{Rept}·		1–8	1–8	closed a year	1–8	1–5	1–6				
Tay Elem.											11				
References/Grades											1–6				
Telachick Elem.										13	10				
References/Grades										1–6	1–6				
Tête Jaune (or Sth) El.						11	12	15	16	28	17	18	18	7	
References/Grades						1–6	2–7	1–8	1–8	1–8	1–7	1–3	1–4	1–4	
Thompson Elem.						9	22	20							
References/Grades						2–6	1–8	1–7							
Upper Fraser Elem.									25	19	35	90	95	71	100
References/Grades									1–9	1–8	1–8	1–7	1–7	K–7	K–7
Valemount Elem.							11	17	19	85	99	207	274	269	272
References/Grades							1–4	1–9	1–8	1–9	1–7	1–7	K–7	K–7	K–6
Valemount Sec.											24	62	101	154	199
References/Grades											8–10	8–10	8–10	8–12	7–12
Van Bien Elem.													307	418	343
References/Grades													1–7	K–7	K–7
Vanway Elem.												364	391	459	279
References/Grades												1–7	1–7	K–7	K–7
Westlake Elem.									9	33	26				
References/Grades									1–4	1–8	1–7				
Westwood Elem.													258	562	423
References/Grades													1–7	K–7	K–7
Wildwood Elem.													242	351	334
References/Grades													1–6	K–7	K–7
Willow River Elem.		24				12	13	42	51	61	50				
References/Grades		^{A}·^{Rept}·		^{A}·^{Rept}·		1–7	1–7	1–8	1–8	1–8	1–6				
Winton Elem.												234	336	107	
References/Grades												special	special	special	
Woodpecker Elem.						7	9	9	12						
References/Grades						3–9	1–9	1–5	1–8						

== See also ==
- List of school districts in British Columbia
- Prince George Youth Containment
