= Shelley, British Columbia =

- Community
- Location of Shelley in British Columbia
- Coordinates: 54°00′00″N 122°37′00″W
- Country: Canada
- Province: British Columbia
- Land District: Cariboo
- Regional District: Fraser-Fort George
- Geographic Region: Robson Valley
- Elevation: 577 m (1,893 ft)
- Time zone: UTC−07:00 (PT)
- Area codes: 250, 778, 236, & 672

Shelley, northeast of Prince George in central British Columbia, was often misspelled as "Shelly", especially during the earlier years. The First Nations Shelley Reserve No. 1 is on the northwest side of the Fraser River, and the Reserve No. 2, on the southeast side, includes a gas station and convenience store. Beyond the west of the latter are freehold properties, comprising about 30 residences immediately and in the vicinity. To the south is the Shell-Glen volunteer firehouse, which lies on the west side of the Gleneagle neighbourhood.

== History ==
=== Railway ===
Shelley, like Foreman to its southwest, and Willow River to its northeast, was an original train station (1914) on the Grand Trunk Pacific Railway (the Canadian National Railway after nationalization). The name, a locational surname from any one of the places called "Shelley", derives from the Olde English pre 7th Century "scylf" meaning literally a shelf cut out of the hillside, plus "leah", an enclosure or wood. Since Shelley, BC, lies on flat lowland, the name likely acknowledges an individual instead. The most probable candidate was a GTP contractor. Another possibility is the poet Percy Bysshe Shelley (1792–1822). If the latter, it was likely on the list prepared by Josiah Wedgwood (submitted at the request of William P. Hinton, the railway's general manager).

Shelley lies at Mile 136.3, Fraser Subdivision (about Mile 226 during the line's construction). In 1912, Magoffin (McGoffin alternate spelling) & Berg (Bergh alternate spelling) subcontracted with camps to the west and east. By 1913, the Mitchell & Ahern camp was at Mile 223, the Nugent & Co. camp at Mile 225, and the Magoffln & Bergh ones at Miles 226 and 230.

During 1980–81, Northwood built 8 kilometres (5 mi) of track and a $14m combined road/rail bridge across the Fraser southeast of Shelley.

Built in 1914, the standard-design Plan 100‐152 (Bohi's Type E) station building, and the Plan 100‐318 freight and the passenger shelter relocated from Foreman in 1963, were demolished in 1969. A nondescript building remained at the closed station into the 2000s.

Service	1914–c.1916	c.1917–c.1921	c.1921–1931	1932–c.1939	c.1940–c.1948	c.1949–1957	1957–1968	1968–1977	1977–c.1989
Passenger	Regular stop	Flag stop	Flag stop		Flag stop	Regular stop	Regular stop	Flag stop	Flag stop
Way freight	Flag stop probably	Flag stop probably	Regular stop	Flag stop	Regular stop	Flag stop	Regular stop	Regular stop	

Siding	Mile No.	1922	1933	1943	1960	1965	1968–72	1977	1990–92
(Capacity Length)		Cars	Cars	Cars	Cars	Cars	Cars	Feet	Feet
Shelley	136.3	68	66	58	54	55	125	5,740	6,420

Other Tracks	Mile No.	1920–22	1933	1943	1960	1965–72	1977	1990	1992
(Capacity Length)		Cars	Cars	Cars	Cars	Cars	Feet	Feet	Feet
McLean Sawmills (former Caine Lumber logging)	134.0			4					
Eagle Lake Sawmills	135.9					28			
McLean Sawmills	136.0		22	?					
Shelley Sawmills	136.0				20				
Eagle Lake Sawmills	136.0					43			
Shelley Sawmills FH 23	136.0						1,940	2,020	
Prince George Sawmills	136.1	Unknown							
Huble FH31 (across Fraser bridge)	138.1							19,870	
Blain's (logging)	138.3	Unknown							
Huble FH32	138.4								600

=== Forestry ===
The narrow strip of accessible spruce forest bordering the railway that stretched some 100 miles (160 km) east of Prince George was known as the East Line. In 1920, the Prince George Sawmill Co. built a 10,000-foot per shift capacity mill. A delegate from the Lumber Workers Industrial Union, who visited that company's logging camp at Shelley the following spring, reported on the abysmal living conditions. Injury and death for humans and horses were common in sawmills and logging camps. In a 1925 incident, logs falling from a sleigh in a pole road accident killed the hauling horse team.

Facing financial troubles by the summer, the mill experienced a change of ownership and name to the Shelly Lumber Co. Legal wrangling continued regarding the debts of the former operation.

In the 1921/22 winter the mill's production goal was 100,000-tie. In 1922, raging forest fires south of Shelley, where the Foreman Lumber Co. was logging, threatened the railway station and the Shelly Lumber Co. mill, but about two million feet of fire-killed timber remained loggable. The following winter the mill had a 60,000-tie goal.

In the 1923/24 winter the mill had a 100,000-tie goal, the Buchanan camp 25,000 ties, and one smaller outfit 10,000 ties. The Mclean mill employed about 50 men in the bush and at the mill (which ran all winter), and the Shelly Lumber Co. about 20 men. This totalled about 200 men working in the sawmills and tie camps.

A 1926 fire, which started in slash, threatened the McLean mill. Two months later fire destroyed the Shelly Lumber Co. mill and the finished lumber stacked in their yard. In 1928, leasing 16 acres of Crown land, the company abandoned the old mill on the slough to build a new 30,000-foot capacity mill at Mile 134 on the Fraser, which was the only one operating in the vicinity at that time. McLean Lumber closed during the Great Depression. McLean Lumber opened a new planing mill in the fall of 1937. In 1939, a small tornado lifted the McLean blacksmith shop roof and carried it about 35 feet. A year later, the sheriff seized company assets to settle outstanding workers' compensation premiums.

The increased wartime lumber demand required upgrading the McLean mill and caused an acute housing shortage. Increasing labour shortages caused some of the smaller mills to close down and focus upon logging crews.

In 1962, Eagle Lake Sawmills of Giscome purchased the 75,000-foot capacity Shelley Sawmills and 150,000-foot capacity planing mill. Logging operations were about 30 miles (48 km) up the Fraser River, whose summer flow transported the logs to the mill.

In 1966, Northwood Pulp and Timber purchased Eagle Lake Sawmills, which included Shelley Sawmills. The next year, after voting in favour of strike action, the IWA strike at BC interior mills ended the following month in the north, but in the south lasted seven months.

By 1975, although weakened lumber markets resulted in massive layoffs and reductions to single shifts at other Northwood sawmills, the Shelley mill, which exported much of its product to the United Kingdom, maintained two shifts a day. The pulpworker strike months later put many sawmill employees on indefinite layoff, owing to a lack of burning capacity or space to store the chips. IWA members at Northwood sawmills, having accepted their latest contract, continued on the job despite the ongoing pulp mill strike. In 1977, the IWA was pressing for one province-wide set of negotiations, while employers in the north, which included the Northwood sawmills, clung to separate talks. The following year, owner-operators of logging trucks stopped deliveries for a month to protest their compensation rates. This resulted in a two-week layoff of workers from the midnight shift at Shelley.

With weakening market demand during 1980, Northwood temporarily introduced a four-day workweek at all sawmills except Shelley, whose off-shore sales again saved it. The following year, lack of progress in contract talks led to illegal strikes, which included Shelley. A month later, Northwood sawmills temporarily implemented four-day workweeks. In early 1982, with the ongoing market slump, the mill implemented a series of one-week shutdowns, which became a two-week on and two-week off work schedule. The company consolidated all vacation time into a four-week period to shut down the mill for the summer. When a five-day week returned in August, Shelley was the only Northwood mill running with a full staff.

In 1984, two weeks of secondary picketing of the mill by the Canadian Paperworkers Union initially had minimal impact in discouraging IWA members and independent truckers from crossing the picket line, but eventually the mill closed for three days until a court order restrained the picketers. CNR crews honoured the picket, which continued another two weeks. Rolling strikes throughout the north during 1986, which escalated into a four-month province-wide woodworkers' strike, resulted in a moratorium on contracting out work normally performed by union members until a royal commission had studied the issue. In 1988, market conditions necessitated a permanent reduction from three to two shifts per day at the mill. To secure log supplies months later, Northwood increased subcontractor payment rates to improve compensation for logging truck owner-operators. The mill permanently closed in 1990 with a loss of about 100 jobs.

=== Community ===
With limited entertainment opportunities, residents attended dances in nearby larger communities. The school, located almost one mile (1.6 km) mile west of the station, opened in 1922, with Edith Emmett as the inaugural teacher.

In 1922, John Newsome of Willow River erected and opened the general store. R. Howatt (Howate alternate spelling) and his sons managed the business and was postmaster 1923–24, a role commonly performed by a storeowner in such towns. They also provided meals and lodging.

The one-room schoolhouse, in which a dance floor was laid, was also the venue for social gatherings. The dances held at the schoolhouse were sometimes combined with card party fundraisers. Lutheran church services took place in the schoolhouse during 1925/26.

Richard H. Kidston applied for a liquor licence in 1925 for premises next to the store, which became a small hotel.

In 1926, the Commonwealth Trading Co., which carried groceries and men's furnishings, had a closing down sale.

In the late 1920s, the predominately black local baseball team ranked respectably in the league.

During the 1930s, the population hovered in the 100–150 range.

From the mid-1930s, interschool sports were periodically held with different groupings of schools. During the late 1930s, the hockey team completed an open-air skating rink.

Victor J. Carlson of Ferndale held Sunday school and church services at Shelley school every Sunday evening, which he continued under the Salvation Army umbrella during the early 1940s.

For several summers from 1947, Knox United Church brought a team to hold a Sunday afternoon/night service in various communities surrounding Prince George.

In 1959, the school board rejected a petition from concerned residents who believed the ongoing admission of certain students displaying behavioral issues presented a safety hazard to fellow pupils. Plans to move a portable from Bonnet Hill never took place, but the Ferndale school building moved instead to provide a second classroom. The seven schools having difficulty attracting teaching staff finally reduced to just Shelley for the 1963/64 year. The 33 students were bussed to other schools until qualified teachers filled the two positions. Student enrolments ranged 15–28 in the late 1940s, 15–23 in the 1950s, and 24–26 in the 1960s. On the school's closing, busses transported students to Blackburn Road from the 1965/66 year.

The RDFFG implemented house numbering in 1989.

=== Crime, Calamity & Safety Measures ===
During the 1950s, the province constructed a flood control station that comprised a concrete shaft, recording station, and two 50-foot steel towers. The automatic readings of volume and velocity provide a preview of expected water conditions on the southern course of the river.

A crew took days to fight a fire 2.5 miles (4.0 km) to the east, which jumped wide fireguards and consumed about 50 acres of logged-over land.

Farmers welcomed the new impounding act in 1954, because straying livestock often destroyed grain and hay fields. Juvenile vandalism and pilfering included smashing windows, and prowlers on the store roof.

Fires destroyed houses in 1929, 1945, 1959, 1963, 1964 and 1986. The rebuilt hall for the Shell-Glen volunteer fire department opened in 1987 with a $9,000 fire truck, financed by community loans and donations.

In 2007, the RDFFG added rip-rap (scrap concrete) to the river bank to prevent erosion, with further revetment work in 2010.

=== Roads ===
The 1915 completion of a wagon road, stretching from Prince George via Six Mile (Tabor) Lake almost to Willow River, likely motivated the Bertschi brothers of Ferndale to build a feeder road connecting Shelley with Ferndale. In 1922, the Public Works Department took control of this, the Shelley Road East. Settlers used the railway line as a southwest trail via Foreman to Prince George. By the mid-1920s, the only road for hauling ties and farm produce to Prince George was the indirect route via Ferndale.

In 1927, a ferry installed to connect Salmon Valley farmers with the railway and the market opportunities of the sawmill camps on the south side of the river, also provided an alternate route from Shelley to Prince George via the Summit Lake road. John Burton from Miworth relocated to become the ferry operator. The ferry, which ran until the mid-1930s, included runs as far as Prince George.

A three-mile (4.8 km) road was completed southeast to today's Gleneagle neighbourhood to provide a more direct access to Prince George. However, this route was only occasionally maintained. When compared to the longer distance via Ferndale, it was described as "ten miles less bumps". Shelley Road East, like other side roads, broke up with each spring thaw and could not be fixed until it dried sufficiently. Even after summer gravelling, logging trucks quickly made the road impassable for many cars. During the early 1980s, the building of the Beaver Forest Service Road east from Shelley separated this heavy traffic. In 1975, the lower section of the southern access received paving as far as the Shelley Road North intersection and ultimately became part of Highway 16. North of the intersection, the road condition remained poor, but was eventually paved.

=== Electricity, Broadcast Transmissions & Communications Devices ===
A 1929 proposal was the stringing of a telephone line from Prince George to connect with the existing line from Shelley to Aleza Lake.

During the pre-electric period, households had battery-operated radios and propane appliances, and some residents had installed their own electrical generators, which ultimately became surplus to requirements. In 1961, with customers sharing in the capital cost, BC Hydro installed distribution lines, and the community also implemented street lighting. CKPG-TV of Prince George, coming on air in 1961, offered a clear reception. BC Hydro extended the power line across the river to the reserve.

Street lighting was upgraded in 1991. The next year, cell phone coverage reached the area. Broadband followed in 2010. In 2016, high-speed internet came to the reserve.

=== Oil & Natural Gas ===
During 1956, Westcoast Transmission built a 1,290-foot natural gas pipe crossing the Fraser, immediately west of the reserve on the north bank, and the township on the south one. Two 150-foot towers on each bank support cables attached to steel rings that carry the 30-inch aerial pipeline, which links Fort St. John to Huntingdon on the international border. By September 1957, gas flowed through the Westcoast Pipeline.

Following the gas line right-of-way, the 505-mile (813 km) Taylor-Kamloops 12-inch oil pipeline opened in 1961.

A 1996 referendum voted to establish a natural gas service for Shelley-Gleneagle residents, the capital cost recoverable over a 10-year period through property taxes.

=== Shelley Reserve ===
With the railway arrival a certainty, speculators focused especially upon the Fort George Band Reserve property and the real estate to its west. After comprehensive negotiations, the band accepted the GTP's $100,000 offer for the reserve in 1911, plus $25,000 relocation costs. Part of the tribe moved to Otway and the remainder to Shelley. Initially, band members lived in hastily constructed shacks and tents until the government erected some 22 homes in 1913 on the new Shelley Reserve (No. 1). Once the GTP began burning the final shacks occupying the old site in 1914, the band, headed by Chief "Louie" (c.1838–1918), completed their relocation. The 1918 influenza pandemic wiped out the Otway group, being in closer proximity to infected European arrivals.

The Carrier name for Prince George was Lheidli.

Treaty negotiations began in December 1993 with the federal government and the province. Chief Barry Seymour admitted that prior poor management was the reason that almost half a million dollars designated for a water system on the north side, and seven housing units, had been spent on other matters. Indian Affairs commented that the band had operated for several years with a great deal of autonomy in administering their own money. The department's only requirement was that the agreed projects be eventually done.

Unsatisfied with headway from the $1m costs incurred, the band council dismissed their head treaty negotiator. The band modified its name to Lheidli (where the two rivers flow together) T'enneh (the People). Chunzoolh Forest Products, a joint venture between Northwood Pulp and Timber and the band, planned to build a new sawmill on the reserve or former mill site. The expected 67 sawmill and logging jobs created would have alleviated the band's 80 percent unemployment rate. The plan downsized to a 16-employee shingle plant, and a commitment to offer band members priority for 32 jobs at the Northwood pulp mill.

Negotiations throughout 1999 and 2000 were on the cusp of a treaty agreement in principle. When presented, the band rejected an offer comprising 2,000 hectares of land and $7.5 million. That year, it gained autonomy in the use of reserve land. The band opened an economic development office in downtown Prince George in 2012. Treaty negotiations continue.
