= Duchess Park Secondary School =

Duchess Park Secondary

Location
- 747 Winnipeg Street; Prince George, British Columbia, V2M 1Y8; Canada
- Coordinates: 53.9164°N 122.75796°W

Information
- School type: Public, high school
- School board: School District 57 Prince George
- School number: 5757012
- Principal: Sid Jawanda
- Staff: 53
- Grades: 8-12
- Enrollment: 975 (May 2026)
- Language: French and English
- Colours: Black, White, and Gold
- Mascot: Condor
- Team name: Condors
- Website: www.duch.sd57.bc.ca
- Last updated: January 6, 2020

Duchess Park Secondary School is a public high school in Prince George, British Columbia, part of School District 57 Prince George.

== History ==
Duchess has also been known as Prince George High School and Duchess Park Junior Secondary School. Prior to 1974, its grade structure comprised Grades 8-10; in 1974-75 Grade 11 was added, and in 1975-76 Grade 12 was added. In 2010, the new building was completed and all the students were moved to the new school which was designed by Hughes Condon Marler Architects.

== Academics ==
Duchess was rated as the top secondary school in Prince George (2004/05)(144th overall in the province) by the 2004/05 Fraser Institute rankings.

== Notable alumni ==
- Daniel Lapp - musician
- John Rustad - politician

== Athletics ==
Duchess Park has consistently placed athletes on provincial teams, national teams and has athletes playing college sports across all levels (USPORTS, CCAA, and NCAA).

The Condors are 14 time Provincial Champions:

- 1980 Boys AAA Basketball Provincial Champions
- 1996 Girls AAA Volleyball Provincial Champions
- 1996 Girls AA Basketball Provincial Champions
- 1997 Girls AAA Volleyball Provincial Champions
- 1997 Girls AA Basketball Provincial Champions
- 2000 Girls AA Basketball Provincial Champions
- 1999 Boys AA Volleyball Provincial Champions
- 2001 Girls AAA Volleyball Provincial Champions
- 2002 Girls AAA Volleyball Provincial Champions
- 2006 Boys AA Basketball Provincial Champions
- 2016 Girls AAA Basketball Provincial Champions
- 2021 Boys AA Volleyball Provincial Champions

Duchess Park played host to the Girls AAA Volleyball Provincial Championships in 2010.

Duchess Park has teams in eleven sports, including basketball, football, wrestling, volleyball, golf, badminton, soccer, rugby, track & field, cross country and Esports.

Duchess Park has won an astounding 120+ North Central District Zone Championships across nearly every sport in which the school has participated in as well as over 30 City Championships for basketball. The high school is widely considered one of the top athletic schools in British Columbia.

The site was also used as a venue for the 2015 Canada Winter Games.
