= College Heights Secondary School =

College Heights Secondary School may refer to:

- College Heights Secondary School (Prince George) in Prince George, British Columbia, Canada
- College Heights Secondary School (Guelph) in Guelph, Ontario, Canada
