= Mackenzie Secondary School =

Location
- Bag 140 500 Skeena Dr; Mackenzie, British Columbia, V0J 2C0; Canada; 55°20′25″N 123°05′22″W

Information
- School type: Public, high school
- Founded: 1971
- School board: School District 57 Prince George
- School number: (250) 997-6510
- Principal: Martin Dugan
- Staff: 25
- Grades: 7–12
- Enrollment: 240 (March 24, 2010)
- Colour
- Team name: Sabres
- Website: https://www.sd57.bc.ca/school/macs/Pages/default.aspx#/=

Mackenzie Secondary School is a public high school in Mackenzie, British Columbia part of School District 57 Prince George. Established in 1971, MSS is home to approximately 250 students in Grades 7 - 12. It is situated in the Rocky Mountain Trench.
