= Prince George Youth Custody Centre =

Juvenile detention centre in Prince George, British Columbia, Canada

- Interactive map of Prince George Youth Custody Centre
- Location: Prince George, British Columbia, Canada; 53.9076°N 122.7090°W
- Capacity: 24
- Opened: 1989
- Closed: March 2024

The Prince George Youth Custody Centre was a youth detention centre in Prince George, British Columbia. Operated by the Ministry of Children and Family Development, the facility had a capacity for 24 beds, prior to being closed in March 2024, due to low-occupancy rates. Upon closure, those in custody were transferred to the province's only remaining youth detention centre in Burnaby.

Prior to closure, School District 57 Prince George operated a high school program at the facility to provide education to students in custody.

== See also ==
- List of youth detention incidents in Canada
- Brookside Youth Centre
- Project Turnaround
- Bluewater Youth Centre
- List of provincial correctional facilities in Ontario
