= D. P. Todd Secondary School =

D.P. Todd Secondary School

Location
- 4444 Hill Ave; Prince George, British Columbia, V2M 5V9; Canada; 53.92371°N 122.81285°W

Information
- School type: Public, high school
- Founded: 1977
- School board: School District 57 Prince George
- School number: 5757100
- Principal: Mrs. Christa Barnes
- Staff: 43
- Grades: 8-12
- Enrollment: 640 (Sep 29, 2016)
- Language: English
- Colours: Blue, Red, brown and White
- Mascot: Todd the Trojan
- Team name: Trojans
- Website: dpts.sd57.bc.ca

D.P. Todd Secondary School is a public high school in Prince George, British Columbia and is part of School District 57 Prince George.

== History ==
Until school catchment changes in 2010, a third of the students came from outside of the catchment area, and a waiting listed existed for student registration, with enrolment capped at around 750 students. Demographic changes in the city of Prince George led to declining enrolment and a dramatic reduction in transfers despite the inclusion of two new catchment schools. D.P. Todd sees enrolment closer to 625 students in recent years, and has adjusted its programs to better serve at-risk students who often face socio-economic challenges. The school is known for its successful band program, quality instruction, and sense of belonging to a learning community felt by staff and students. The school is named after Dave Todd, a long-time school SD#57 superintendent. He was known for visiting schools and performing impromptu magic shows.

== Academics ==
D.P. Todd Secondary was rated 111 out of 316 schools in the province by the 2007/2008 Fraser Institute rankings.

According to the school performance report released by the BC Ministry of Education in 2007, students from D.P. Todd scored higher and had a higher participation rate in most provincially examinable courses than the district and provincial average.

== Athletics ==
D.P. Todd Secondary has teams for hockey, rugby, badminton, tennis, golfing, basketball, soccer, volleyball, and wrestling. The senior hockey team has taken 1st place in the city three years in a row.

D.P. Todd is also host to the D.P. Todd Floor Hockey League (DPFHL). D.P Todd Senior girls volleyball team won first place in North Central Zone's in 2010, as well as in many previous years. D.P Todd has new technology update now

== Band program ==
The band program at D.P. Todd is directed by Mike Kennedy. The program includes various levels of both concert and jazz bands. The band program has earned recognition in the MusicFest Canada national festival several times since 1999.

- one gold medal in 2026 in Edmonton
- One gold medal in 2015 in Toronto
- One silver medal in 2010 at Ottawa.
- One gold and one silver medal in 2006 at Ottawa.
- One gold and one silver medal in 2002 at Calgary.
- Three silver medals in 1999 at Toronto.
