= Jack of Clubs Creek =

Stream and lake in British Columbia, Canada

Coordinates: 53°6′10″N 121°34′11″W

Jack of Clubs Creek is a creek located in the Cariboo region of British Columbia. This creek was discovered in 1861. It was mined and yielded about $450,000 in gold during the early years. A survey in 1987 found the tailings deposited in the valley were leaching heavy metals into the water, and that the concentrations of mercury in fish caught in the area were at the upper limit of safety for human consumption. In 2023, a new underground gold mine was approved to begin construction in the area, with the conditions for construction including remediation to remove contamination left by the previous mine.

== Hydrology ==
The creek feeds the Jack of Clubs Lake, and the outflow of the lake drains into the Willow River at Wells. Average flow at the mouth is 0.99m^{3}/s.
