= Willow River (British Columbia) =

Location
- Country: Canada
- Province: British Columbia
- District: Cariboo Land District

Physical characteristics
- Source: Jack of Clubs Lake
  - coordinates: 53°6′9″N 121°34′11″W
- Mouth: Fraser River
  - coordinates: 54°5′11″N 122°30′28″W
  - elevation: 584 m (1,916 ft)
- Discharge
  - location: gage 08KD006
  - average: 37.0 m^{3}/s (1,310 cu ft/s)
  - minimum: 3.20 m^{3}/s (113 cu ft/s)
  - maximum: 572 m^{3}/s (20,200 cu ft/s)

The Willow River is a tributary of the Fraser River in the north-central Interior of British Columbia, Canada. It enters the Fraser near the community of Willow River, just upstream from the city of Prince George, near the confluence of the Salmon River. Its source is in the Cariboo goldfields at Jack of Clubs Lake in the mining and arts community of Wells, British Columbia, near Barkerville. In 1974, the canyon of the Willow River, east of Prince George, was the scene of a tragic accident involving eight teenagers who died when their three canoes and kayak were broken in the raging waters and boulders of a narrow gorge.

== See also ==
- List of rivers of British Columbia
