= Salmon River (Fraser River tributary) =

Location
- Country: Canada
- Province: British Columbia
- District: Cariboo Land District

Physical characteristics
- Mouth: Fraser River
  - coordinates: 54°4′1″N 122°33′35″W
  - elevation: 568 m (1,864 ft)
- Discharge
  - location: near Prince George
  - average: 28.8 m^{3}/s (1,020 cu ft/s)
  - minimum: 1.4 m^{3}/s (49 cu ft/s)
  - maximum: 383 m^{3}/s (13,500 cu ft/s)

The Salmon River is a tributary of the Fraser River in the Central Interior of British Columbia, Canada, flowing southeast to meet that river to the west of Eaglet Lake, to the north of the city of Prince George. The community of Salmon Valley is located in its basin. It was formerly known as the Little Salmon River.

The nearby McGregor River was originally named the Big Salmon River.

== See also ==
- List of rivers of British Columbia
