= College Heights Historic District =

Historic district in Pennsylvania, United States

- U.S. National Register of Historic Places
- U.S. Historic district
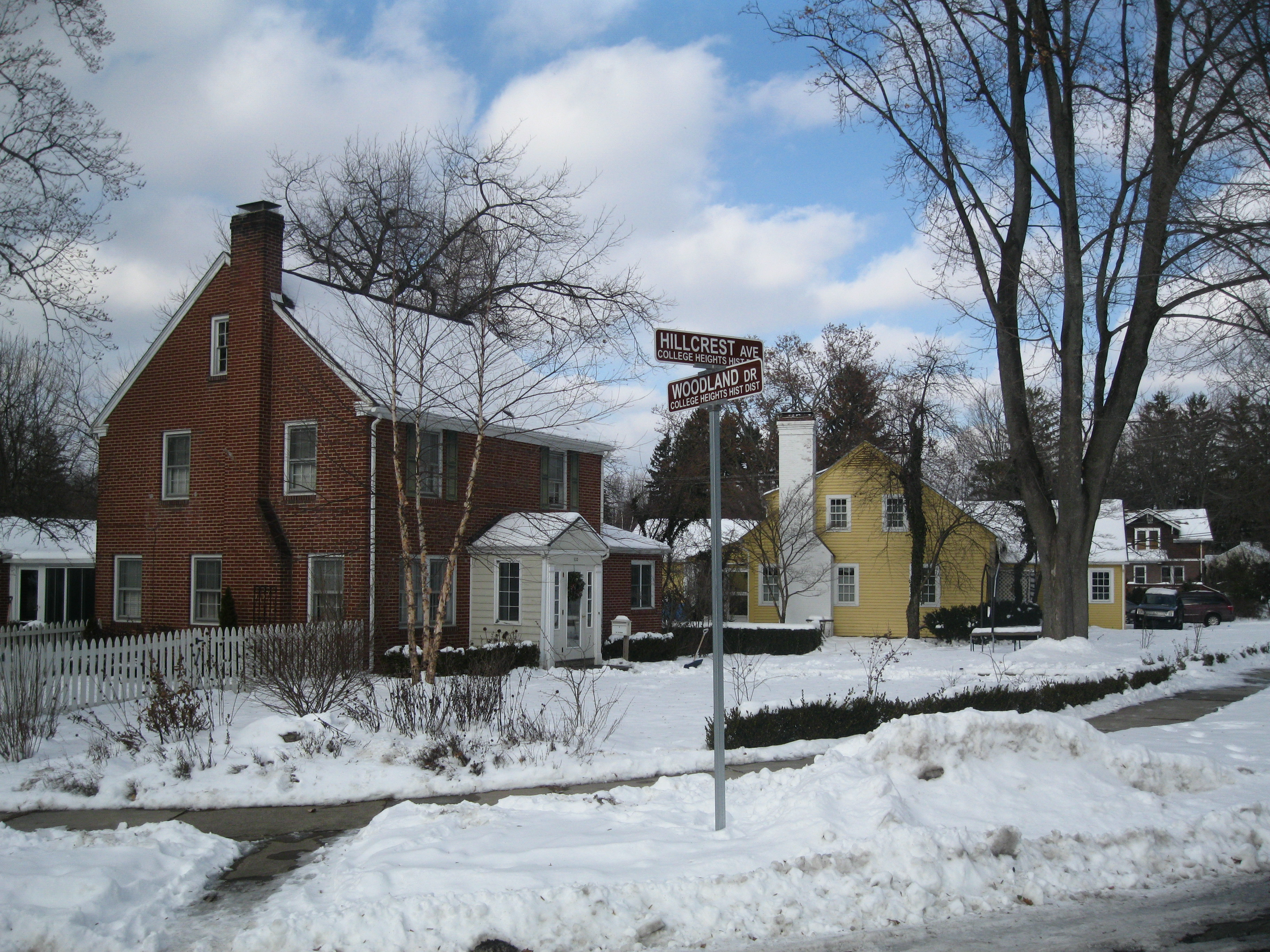
- Corner of Hillcrest Ave. and Woodland Dr. in 2013

- Location within Pennsylvania Location within the United States
- Location: Roughly bounded by Holmes St., Park Ave., Ridge Ave., Sunset Rd., Hillcrest Ave., Woodland Dr. and Mitchell Ave., State College, Pennsylvania
- Coordinates: 40°47′57″N 77°52′28″W
- Area: 109 acres (44 ha)
- Built: 1904
- Architect: Multiple
- Architectural style: Colonial Revival, Tudor Revival, Bungalow/craftsman
- NRHP reference No.: 95000514
- Added to NRHP: April 27, 1995

College Heights Historic District is a national historic district located at State College, Centre County, Pennsylvania. The district includes 278 contributing buildings in an almost exclusively middle-class residential area of State College. The district reflects the growth and architecture of State College as an emerging college town. The houses are largely wood frame and reflect a number of popular early-20th-century architectural styles including Colonial Revival, Tudor Revival, and Bungalow.

It was added to the National Register of Historic Places in 1995.
