= Valemount Secondary School =

Valemount Secondary
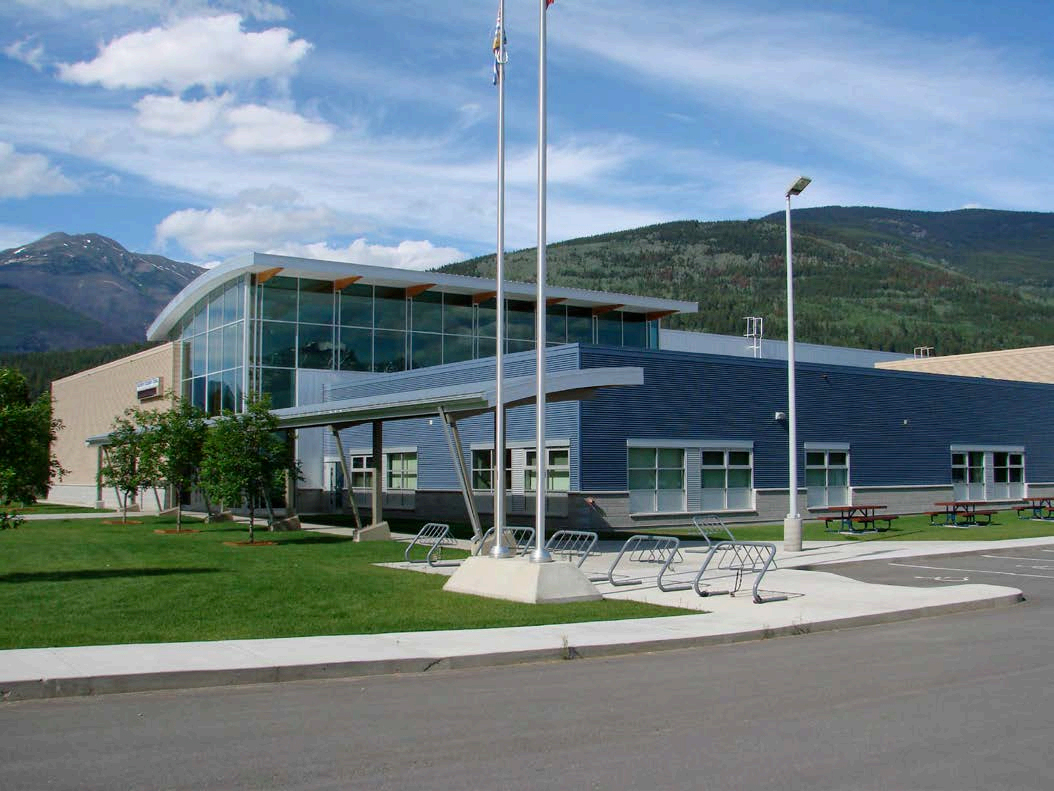

Location
- 201 Ash Street, PO Box 370; Valemount, British Columbia, V0E 2Z0; Canada
- Coordinates: 52°49′39.85″N 119°15′26.97″W

Information
- Former name: Valemount Junior Secondary
- School type: Public, high school
- Established: 1952
- School board: School District 57 Prince George
- School number: 5757074
- Principal: Mr. Derrick Shaw
- Staff: 15
- Grades: 8-12
- Enrollment: 78 (October 12, 2016)
- Capacity: 150
- Language: English
- Team name: Timberwolves
- Communities served: Valemount and Tête Jaune Cache
- Website: vals.sd57.bc.ca

Valemount Secondary is a public high school in Valemount, British Columbia part of School District 57 Prince George.

== History ==
Initially, the first schools in Valemount only offered classes up to the grade 10 level and students would have to attend other schools in the area to graduate. When the current elementary school was finished construction in 1975, the junior secondary school was converted into a secondary school following the addition of several rooms annexes. Since 1975, students were able to graduate in Valemount. This building was located at 1300, 5th Avenue and served as a school from 1952 until 2006 when it was demolished. The property was sold to Saas Fee Holdings Inc. on December 14, 2007, for $950,000.

In April 2002, approval was granted for the purchase of new school grounds at 201 Ash Street. The contract for the construction of the new school was awarded to Maloney Contractors Ltd. for $7,881,774.08. On November 8, 2005, the current secondary building officially opened. Construction of the current school building was completed in 2006.

== Community contributions ==
Community members raised almost $250,000 to include additional space during construction that would become available for the community to use.
