= John McInnis Jr. Secondary School =

John McInnis Centre
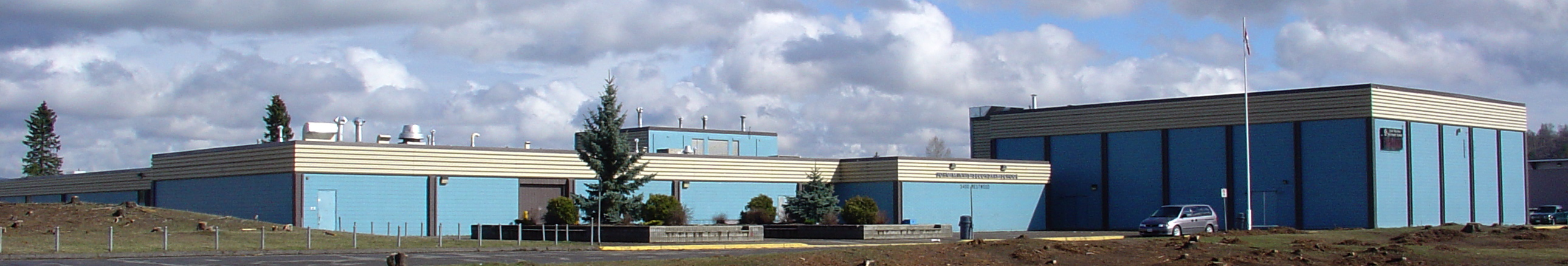

Location
- 3400 Westwood Drive; Prince George, British Columbia, V2N 1S1; Canada; 53.8867°N 122.7781°W

Information
- School type: Public, high school
- Founded: 1973
- School board: School District 57 Prince George
- School number: 5757080
- Principal: Ms. Christa Barnes
- Grades: K-12
- Language: English
- Colours: Navy, Burgundy and White
- Mascot: The Royal Lion
- Team name: Royals
- Website: www.sd57.bc.ca/school/cla/Pages/default.aspx

John McInnis Centre is a public high school in the Prince George, British Columbia part of School District 57 Prince George.

== History ==
John McInnis Secondary was built in 1973 to fill the growing needs of the west side of the city. In 1973, the staff and students made a symbolic trek from Lakewood Junior Secondary where they had been on shift, to their brand new quarters at John McInnis. The school district honoured the pioneering spirit of John McInnis, who died in March 1972, by naming the new school after him.

== Demographics ==
John McInnis is the Centre for Learning Alternatives in the Central Interior. Students come from a broad range of socioeconomic and racial groups. It offers Distance Education, Continuing Education (Adult Education), as well as many off-site programs to help students in Prince George.

== Sports ==
Boys

- 1997 "AA" Junior Basketball Provincial Champions
- 2005 "AA" Junior Basketball Provincial Finalists
- 2006 "AA" Junior Basketball Provincial Champions
- 2009 "AA" Junior Basketball Provincial Finalists
- 2003 "AA" Junior Volleyball Provincial Champions
- 2004 "AA" Junior Volleyball Provincial Finalists
- 2007 "AA" Junior Volleyball Provincial Champions
- 2009 "AA" Junior Volleyball Provincial Champions

Girls

- 1992 "AA" Junior Volleyball Provincial Finalists
- 1993 "AA" Junior Volleyball Provincial Finalists
