= College Heights Secondary School (Prince George) =

College Heights Secondary

Location
- 6184 Domano Blvd; Prince George, British Columbia, V2N 3Z4; Canada
- Coordinates: 53.8634°N 122.7643°W

Information
- School type: Public, high school
- School board: School District 57 Prince George
- School number: 5757101
- Administrator: Tech
- Staff: 53
- Grades: 8-12
- Enrollment: Approximately 1000 (2022)
- Language: Primarily English
- Colours: White and blue
- Mascot: Blue Cougar
- Team name: Cougars

College Heights Secondary is a public high school for grades 8-12 in Prince George, British Columbia. It is part of School District 57 Prince George.

== Academics and extracurriculars ==
In addition to core subjects (e.g. Math, English, Science, Social Studies, French, Physical Education), the school offers a leadership program, Japanese exchange program, drama club, debating club, and yearly sailing trips to the BC coast.

Athletic teams include volleyball, rugby, basketball, hockey, and football. Electives include infotech, dance, home economics, wood shop, drafting, and visual arts.

Courses in German, French, Japanese, and Spanish are offered. College Heights is one of the few schools in Prince George to offer an AP (Advanced Placement) English class.

== Academic ranking ==
In 2020, College Heights Secondary School was ranked by The Fraser Institute as the best high school in Prince George in terms of academic performance, and 63rd in British Columbia.
