= Salmon Valley =

Salmon Valley, British Columbia
- Community
- Location of Salmon Valley in British Columbia
- Coordinates: 54°05′00″N 122°42′00″W
- Country: Canada
- Province: British Columbia
- Regional District: Fraser-Fort George
- Time zone: UTC−07:00 (PT)

Salmon Valley is a community on the British Columbia Railway north of Prince George, British Columbia.
