= Regional District of Fraser–Fort George =

Regional district in British Columbia, Canada

Fraser–Fort George
- Regional district
- Regional District of Fraser–Fort George
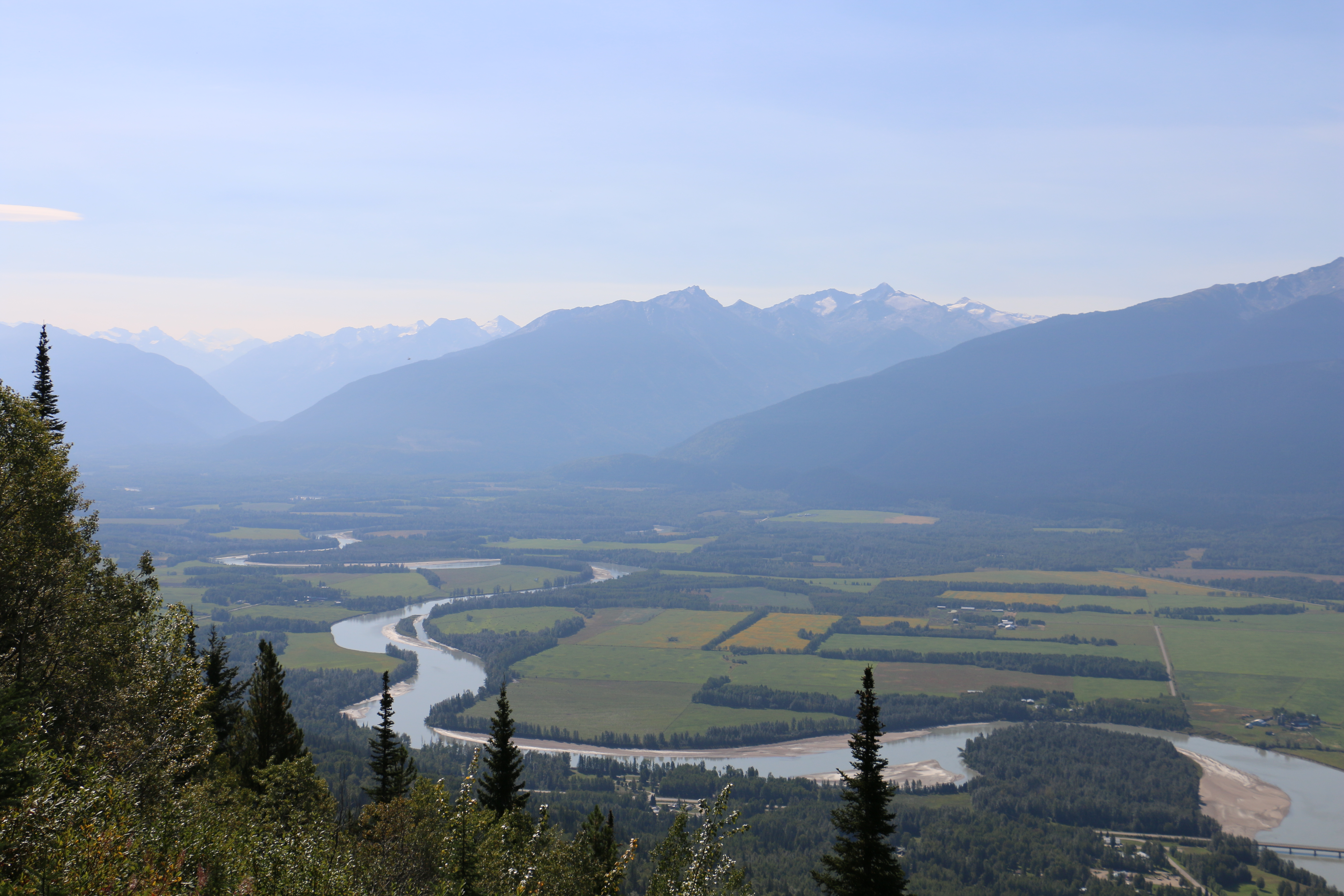
- Upper Fraser River

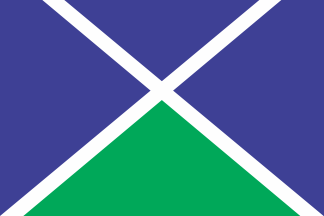
- Flag Logo

- Major communities

- Location in British Columbia
- Country: Canada
- Province: British Columbia
- Administrative office location: Prince George

Government
  - Type: Regional district
  - Body: Board of directors
  - Chair: Art Kaehn (E)
  - Vice chair: Lara Beckett (C)
  - Electoral areas: A – Salmon River–Lakes; C – Chilako River–Nechako; D – Tabor Lake–Stone Creek; E – Woodpecker–Hixon; F – Willow River–Upper Fraser; G – Crooked River–Parsnip; H – Robson Valley–Canoe

Area
  - Land: 50,676.10 km^{2} (19,566.15 sq mi)

Population (2016)
  - Total: 94,506
  - Density: 1.86/km^{2} (4.8/sq mi)
- Website: www.rdffg.bc.ca

The Regional District of Fraser–Fort George (RDFFG) is a regional district located in the Central Interior of British Columbia, Canada. It is bounded by the Alberta border to the east, the Columbia–Shuswap and Thompson–Nicola regional districts to the south and southeast, Cariboo Regional District to the southwest, the Regional District of Bulkley–Nechako to the west, and the Peace River Regional District to the north and northeast. As of the Canada 2011 Census, Fraser–Fort George had a population of 91,879 and a land area of 51,083.73 km^{2} (19,723.54 sq mi). The offices of the regional district are located at Prince George.

== Communities ==
=== City ===
- Prince George

=== District municipality ===
- Mackenzie

=== Villages ===
- McBride
- Valemount

=== Regional district electoral areas ===
- Fraser–Fort George A – Salmon River–Lakes
- Fraser–Fort George C – Chilako River–Nechako
- Fraser–Fort George D – Tabor Lake–Stone Creek
- Fraser–Fort George E – Woodpecker–Hixon
- Fraser–Fort George F – Willow River–Upper Fraser Valley
- Fraser–Fort George G – Crooked River–Parsnip
- Fraser–Fort George H – Robson Valley–Canoe

=== Indian Reserves ===
NB Indian Reserves are not part of municipal or regional district governance and are outside the regional district's jurisdiction, and also counted separately in the census figures.

- Fort George (Shelley) Indian Reserve No. 2
- McLeod Lake Indian Reserve No. 1
- Parsnip Indian Reserve No. 5

=== Designated places ===
- Bear Lake
- Salmon Valley
- Summit Lake
- Willow River

== Demographics ==
As a census division in the 2021 Census of Population conducted by Statistics Canada, the Regional District of Fraser-Fort George had a population of 96,979 living in 40,224 of its 43,377 total private dwellings, a change of 2.6% from its 2016 population of 94,506. With a land area of 50,580.72 km^{2} (19,529.33 sq mi), it had a population density of 1.9/km^{2} (5.0/sq mi) in 2021.

Panethnic groups in the Fraser–Fort George Regional District (1991–2021)
Panethnic group	2021		2016		2011		2006		2001		1996		1991	
Panethnic group	Pop.	%	Pop.	%	Pop.	%	Pop.	%	Pop.	%	Pop.	%	Pop.	%
European (Note: Statistic includes all persons that did not make up part of a visible minority or an indigenous identity.)	71,800	75.34%	72,560	78.08%	73,895	81.66%	77,320	84.39%	80,945	85.34%	87,785	89.12%	78,765	87.15%
Indigenous	13,995	14.69%	13,395	14.41%	10,915	12.06%	9,630	10.51%	8,875	9.36%	6,355	6.45%	7,970	8.82%
South Asian	4,060	4.26%	2,640	2.84%	2,020	2.23%	2,040	2.23%	2,620	2.76%	2,035	2.07%	1,930	2.14%
Southeast Asian (Note: Statistic includes total responses of "Filipino" and "Southeast Asian" under visible minority section on census.)	1,850	1.94%	1,460	1.57%	1,250	1.38%	780	0.85%	615	0.65%	355	0.36%	365	0.4%
East Asian (Note: Statistic includes total responses of "Chinese", "Korean", and "Japanese" under visible minority section on census.)	1,565	1.64%	1,390	1.5%	1,345	1.49%	1,130	1.23%	1,095	1.15%	1,290	1.31%	810	0.9%
African	1,170	1.23%	755	0.81%	615	0.68%	400	0.44%	380	0.4%	360	0.37%	380	0.42%
Latin American	265	0.28%	275	0.3%	155	0.17%	140	0.15%	205	0.22%	95	0.1%	130	0.14%
Middle Eastern (Note: Statistic includes total responses of "West Asian" and "Arab" under visible minority section on census.)	250	0.26%	215	0.23%	205	0.23%	65	0.07%	0	0%	50	0.05%	30	0.03%
Other (Note: Statistic includes total responses of "Visible minority, n.i.e." and "Multiple visible minorities" under visible minority section on census.)	335	0.35%	240	0.26%	105	0.12%	130	0.14%	130	0.14%	170	0.17%	—N/a	—N/a
Total responses	95,300	98.27%	92,935	98.34%	90,495	98.49%	91,625	99.31%	94,855	99.52%	98,505	99.53%	90,380	99.6%
Total population	96,979	100%	94,506	100%	91,879	100%	92,264	100%	95,317	100%	98,974	100%	90,739	100%

- Note: Totals greater than 100% due to multiple origin responses.
