= Upper Fraser, British Columbia =

- Community
- Location of Upper Fraser in British Columbia
- Coordinates: 54°07′00″N 121°56′00″W
- Country: Canada
- Province: British Columbia
- Land District: Cariboo
- Regional District: Fraser-Fort George
- Geographic Region: Robson Valley
- Elevation: 610 m (2,000 ft)
- Time zone: UTC−07:00 (PT)
- Area codes: 250, 778, 236, & 672

. Upper Fraser developed between Aleza Lake and Hansard on the southwest side of the Fraser River in central British Columbia. The community of about 20 residents comprises a post-office and several houses straddling Upper Fraser Road.

== Transportation ==
A trackside signpost marks Upper Fraser station, a flag stop for Via Rail's Jasper – Prince Rupert train. The immediate Via Rail stops are Aleza Lake to the west and McGregor to the southeast.

== History ==
=== Railway ===
Upper Fraser lies at Mile 104.0, Fraser Subdivision. Previously designated as Mile 194 and the Hudson Bay Spur, it was the closest railway point east of Willow River for accessing the Fraser. During 1914, Edward Andrew Seebach (1880–1932) (Seeback alternate spelling) and Albert James Huble (1872–1947) (Hubble alternate spelling), and farmer George McDowell, their agent, regularly advertised their weekly passenger and freight motorboat service to Giscome Portage, which connected with the waterways to the Peace Country via Finlay Forks. Five years later, the opening of the Prince George–Summit Lake wagon road superseded this route.

A steamboat service from Prince George operated into the 1920s. The spur also provided the best link to the outside world for mining and hunting activities to its north and northwest that encompassed the river and its tributaries. Unlike the unsafe and difficult Giscome Rapids downstream, calm waters prevailed upstream to the spur. However, winter freezing, limited river use to summer months.

In May 1913, during the Grand Trunk Pacific Railway construction, the Smith and Ramsay camp was just northwest at former Mile 195, and their engineer, F. Purvis, was just southeast at former Mile 193. Although variations of the name Hudson Bay Spur were in use until the 1930s, the 1920 description as the Hudson Bay’s old spur suggests the actual spur had fallen into disuse by that time. Largely known as Upper Fraser Spruce Mills from the early 1940s, the Canadian National Railway station was called Upper Fraser from 1964.

During the 1945/46 winter, when a brush with a freight train broke a moose's leg, a rifle shot put the hobbling animal out of its misery. Rather than plunging into the deep snow flanking the roadbed, moose often ran ahead of trains for miles, which delayed services and hindered section crews (track maintenance). Moose not only challenged trains, but also charged children on their way to school, or adults walking along the tracks. During the 1948/49 winter, a snow plow traveling at 25 mph (40 km/h) scooped up William John Zuck lying on the tracks. The plow train's crew car carried the victim to Prince George, where a hospital examination found no injuries.

A westbound freight train instantly killed deaf George Whitford (1885–1965), who was sitting upon the track at Upper Fraser. The following year, a 160-foot (49 m) washout west of Aleza Lake terminated a westbound passenger train at Upper Fraser. The mill cookhouse fed the passengers, who remained on board. Towed through heavy mud and deep holes by bulldozers near Giscome, three buses brought eastbound passengers from Prince George, and returned with the westbound ones. In 1968, a railway accident cost H. Dyck two toes.

In 1978, Upper Fraser was one of the 11 communities between Prince Rupert and the Alberta border, where the CNR replaced its agent-operator position with a resident serving as a CN Express agent.

Service	1943–c.1947	c.1948–c.1953	c.1954–c.1958	c.1959–1961	1961–c.1962	c.1963–1965	1965–1977	1977–present
Passenger	Flag stop	Flag stop		Flag stop	Flag stop	Flag stop	Regular stop	Flag stop
Way freight	Probable flag stop	Flag stop	Flag stop	Probable flag stop	Flag stop	Flag stop	Regular stop	

Other Tracks	Mile No.*	1943–60	1965	1968	1972	1977	1990–92
(Capacity Length)		Cars	Cars	Cars	Cars	Feet	Feet
Upper Fraser Spruce Mills	104.0	11	35	103			
Upper Fraser	104.0						5,600
Northwood Timber	104.1				85		
Upper Fraser Sawmills	104.1					3,650	

- Assumedly, a remeasurement confirmed the spur switch was closer to Mile 104.0

=== Forestry ===
The narrow strip of accessible spruce forest bordering the railway that stretched some 100 miles (160 km) east of Prince George was known as the East Line. Reputedly, a small mill existed at the location in 1928.

In 1935, Donald (Don) S. McPhee (1892–1964), formerly at Sinclair Mills, and A. Roy Spurr (1885–1954), formerly at Penny, partners in the Giscome mill, acquired and relocated the equipment from the bankrupt Longworth Lumber Co. The following year, pioneer lumberman George Stauble (1898–1971) supervised the reconstruction. Incorporated as the Upper Fraser Spruce Mills, the 40,000-foot per shift capacity modern mill opened in 1939. That year, the three mills controlled by the partnership produced almost 60 percent of the lumber in the Prince George district. Cecil T. Clare (1905–85) came from Sinclair Mills in 1937 to manage the 100-man company. He was president of the Northern Interior Lumberman's Association (1945–48 and 1959–60).

From 1940, Clare largely replaced horses with vehicles for hauling logs from the bush. C. Merle, his wife, was active in the local Red Cross fundraising efforts. The company logging Camp 13 temporarily closed for a week in 1942, while the crew went to fight a forest fire at Purden Lake. During the 1942/43 winter, a falling tree fractured logger Albert Roussin's skull, and a decking hoist employee at Camp 15 badly burned his face when a blow torch, thawing an engine, caused a gas tank explosion.

During the following winter, snow accumulation collapsed the roofs of a bunkhouse and barn at Camp 17. Eight escaped unhurt, one sustained concussion, and another suffered minor facial injuries, but a horse died. When braces broke weeks later, the released large deck of logs fatally crushed George Swan (1894–1944). Employees contributed to a collection for his widow. While riding the steam-powered saw carriage, which steadily moves a log through the saw blade, dogger Albert Anderson (1925–44) encountered a sudden failure of the steam feed valve. The uncontrollable carriage forcefully ejected him, fatally breaking his neck. In 1945, logger Adolf Bruestle (later at Aleza Lake) sustained extensive facial abrasions at Camp 17. Two years later, James Ernest Clish (1927–87) lost a leg in a mill accident. Although the 1949 fire totally consumed the mill, the rebuilding project took only three months.

Falling branches or tree trunks killed company loggers Jean Ouellette (c.1927–50) and Emanuel Zielke (1927–50), prompting calls for better training. Mile 98 (McGregor) was the next logging camp. When the government introduced forest management licences that year, Upper Fraser Spruce Mills was among the first five approved in principle within the Prince George district, and quickly granted. Logging moved from the Bowron River to Mile 98. (Nick) Vid Tomich (1893–1958) sustained fatal spinal injuries after tumbling from a 12-foot-high lumber pile. A year later, the company received one of the nine tree farm licenses that followed from the 1956 Royal Commission Report.

In 1960, Don McPhee and Cecil T. Clare sold Upper Fraser Spruce Ltd. for almost a million dollars to National Forest Products Ltd. (NFP) (formerly Midway Terminals Ltd.). Soon moving to Vancouver, Clare was chair of Canadian Lumber Standards (1962–71). Already owning Sinclair Spruce Lumber Co. Ltd., NFP appointed E.R. McDonald as general manager for both companies. Within a year, the Noranda Mines Ltd./Mead Corporation partnership established Northwood Pulp and Timber Ltd., which acquired the above operations. The next year, John R. Blackstock became general manager. A heavy plate falling from a crawler inflicted fatal head injuries upon mechanic William (Bill) H. Chance (1921–62), who had recently transferred from Sinclair Mills. A 1964 fire destroyed a diesel generating unit and part of the mill powerhouse.

In the late 1960s, the mill underwent a major expansion. After voting in favour of strike action, the IWA strike at BC interior mills ended the following month in the north, but in the south lasted seven months. The 480,000-foot capacity Upper Fraser operation provided woodchips to Northwood Pulp in Prince George as a by-product. The mill built and equipped a recreation centre, catering especially for the 100–130 single employees.

Another round of strike ballots began in October 1970, which led to a wildcat strike, before employees at Northwood sawmills at Eagle Lake and Upper Fraser, along with Its McGregor logging camp, ratified the proposed contract settlement. A strike vote followed when the 1972 contract negotiations broke off. An alleged unjustified disciplinary action by a supervisor, an open sewage system, and sham safety procedures, prompted an illegal walkout. Workers returned after a couple of days, but walked out again within two days, when the company refused to promise that strikers would not receive disciplinary action. An injunction forced employees back within two days.

In 1973, a freight car shortage increased finished lumber inventory. When exacerbated by a nationwide rail strike, all five northern BC sawmills operated by Northwood Pulp and Timber closed for a week. A year later, weakened lumber markets resulted in massive layoffs at Northwood's Houston and Upper Fraser sawmills, and reducing to single shifts from the fall. The seven-week BC Rail strike, which ended in January 1975, hampered woodchip shipments to the Northwood pulp mills. However, it did not delay the Upper Fraser sawmill reopening after the Christmas/New Year break. The pulpworker strike months later put many sawmill employees on indefinite layoff, owing to a lack of burning capacity or space to store the chips. IWA members at Northwood sawmills, having accepted their latest contract, continued on the job despite the ongoing pulp mill strike. In 1977, the IWA was pressing for one province-wide set of negotiations, while employers in the north, which included the Northwood sawmills, clung to separate talks. The following year, owner-operators of logging trucks protested their compensation rates.

Surpassing earlier upgrades, the company installed a new double-cut bandsaw and lumber sorter in 1978 in a $6.4 million modernization to improve the mill's efficiency. Paul A. Calder (1931–79) died of asphyxiation after falling into a hog fuel intake bin. Northwood sawmills at Prince George, Upper Fraser, Shelley and Houston supplied half the woodchip requirements for the Prince George pulp mill. With weakening market demand during 1980, Northwood temporarily introduced a four-day workweek at all sawmills except Shelley. The following year, lack of progress in contract talks led to illegal strikes, which included Upper Fraser. The summer province-wide strike lasted six weeks. A month later, Northwood sawmills temporarily implemented four-day workweeks.

In early 1982, with the ongoing market slump, the Upper Fraser mill further reduced output from 80 percent to 60 percent by laying off indefinitely 117 out of 251 employees, and adopting a one-shift five-day workweek. To reduce energy costs, the mill installed new burners that consumed wood shavings instead of natural gas or propane. The process heated oil for circulation to drying kilns and the mill itself. The company consolidated all vacation time into a four-week period to shut down the mill for the summer. The next summer, the mill returned to two shifts and the workforce totalled 1,000.

Rolling strikes throughout the north during 1986, which escalated into a four-month province-wide woodworkers strike, resulted in a moratorium on contracting out work normally performed by union members until a royal commission had studied the issue. The following spring, mill employees and the Upper Fraser volunteer fire department tackled a huge fire in the log deck area. Their 1954 Thibault fire truck ran nonstop for 36 hours, assisted by the company's helicopter hauling water to drop on the burning logs and a fire bomber dropping retardant. After protecting the mill and the town since the 1970s, the department acquired a replacement fire truck. Northwood donated the Thibault to the Prince George Railway and Forestry Museum in 1999.

Bandsaw operator Shirley Anne Elaine Peterson (c.1952–88) sustained fatal injuries when pinned between lumber and a roller case. Later that year, market conditions necessitated a two-week shutdown. To secure log supplies months later, Northwood increased subcontractor payment rates to improve compensation for logging truck owner-operators. In 1990 and 1993, disputes triggered brief walkouts.

The 1990 $16.5 million modernization, which closed the mill for several weeks, was far more extensive than the rebuilds in the 1950s, 1968, and 1978. New computerized equipment controlled thinner saw blades and edgers that maximized the amount of square lumber from each round log, but eliminated 10–15 jobs. An additional wood waste burner lowered emissions. Capacity increased to 960,000 board feet. The next year, the second shift was dropped for four weeks. A 1994 mill fire damaged wiring for the cut-off saws which turn log stems into desired lengths. During 1995, a new edger-optimizer was installed, and a single shift operated for eight weeks over the summer.

A 1997 fire, on a sub-zero January night, destroyed the primary breakdown area where the logs entered the mill. The volunteer fire department was able to save the other half, housing the head rig and high-tech equipment. The larger machinery, like cut-off saws, debarkers and canters sustained $20–30 million of damage. (The latter is a moving deck that cuts round logs into a square shape for processing as lumber, while the curved parts move on to become chips for a pulp mill). The planer mill, operating a single shift, continued processing existing inventory and lumber trucked in from elsewhere. After a period of uncertainty, Northwood announced plans to rebuild. This included a new $6 million merchandiser (a mechanized deck that fed and cut to length the arriving logs). The mill, which traditionally handled the larger logs, became equally suited to handle the predominantly medium sizes available. About eight months after the fire, the mill resumed production, reaching full operation a month later. Weakening demand prompted a short shutdown a year later.

In 1999, Canfor purchased the Northwood operations, which included the Upper Fraser mill. Securing a three-year pact with the IWA, the company doubled shutdowns. The $8.5-million insurance settlement for the 1997 fire helped Canfor's 2001 first quarter profit. The mill permanently closed in 2003.

=== Community ===
During the mid-to-late 1940s, the location gradually became Upper Fraser and the former name of Mile 104 phased out. From 1940, children attended school in Hansard, where they occasionally stayed overnight when the road was impassable. Samuel Laird was the inaugural Upper Fraser postmaster 1942–44. The musically gifted William (Bill) (1911–48) & Jeanne (c.1919–2003) Padlesky and children arrived in 1943, where Bill worked in the mill. Tired of walking three miles (4.8 km) to the Hansard store for groceries and the mail, they opened the first general store in the community. Although the mill was designated as the postmaster 1944–48, the post-office clearly was not open for all of this period.

Budgeted at $7,500, the one-room school opened for the 1948/49 year. The community held dances and other fundraising socials in the building. Gordon Gale opened a store, and wife Lorraine (1920–69) was postmaster 1948–50 and 1952–60, a role commonly performed by a store owner in such towns. Harold Toplis (1908–84) took over in 1951, and wife Eleanor (1900–93) (né Stewart, former Hansard teacher) was postmaster 1950–52. Organized religion during the 1950s was limited to occasional United Church baptisms, and Catholic services on alternate Sundays at the school.

Disembarking Ole Hansen of Hansard's boat prior to its capsizing, saved Mable and Gladys (the older Padlesky children) from a likely drowning. Months later, when a fire raged through the Padlesky store and home, Mable (1938–2014) was away at boarding school. Gladys (1941–2004) crawled out, mother Jeanne dragged Joyce (1943–55) in a sheet, and holding Gloria (c.1948–), they exited to safety, but the blaze destroyed the building and all their possessions. An alternate account mentions a forest fire as the cause, and Joyce running back into the burning building before her mother rescued her. Jeanne remarrying, the family moved to Prince George. Joyce, still haunted by the fire, drowned in the Fraser River. A 1968 fire gutted a small cabin Jeanne owned at Willow River.

In 1953, a new hall opened. Budgeted at $2,500 for the building and $500 for furnishings, a teacherage came in the mid-1950s. Enrolments ranged 19–46 until 1960. To address overcrowding, an additional one-room building provided more classroom space and teaching staff.

Francis (Frank) H. (1913–75) & Dorothy M. (1917–92) Hern owned the store/gas bar. Dorothy was postmaster from 1960. Their son Brian (1951–60) died in a motor vehicle accident at Aleza Lake.

During the early 1960s, the United Church held Sunday afternoon services, sometimes as frequently as every second week. With the appointment of a lay minister at Giscome, oversight transferred from St. Andrews in Prince George. During the mid-1960s, services were held on alternate Wednesday evenings.

The school board budgeted $33,000 for a building program. For the 1964/65 year, pressing needs elsewhere, meant only two new portables were available, plus one from the Aleza Lake school. The mill operated the bus to transport students the six miles (9.7 km) from that location. By 1965, two surplus teacherages existed at Upper Fraser. The Royal Produce supermarket opened in 1966.

Northwood approached the RDFFG to examine a proposal for a town site. The preliminary 1972 study indicated few people were interested in owning houses in the area and preferred better roads for commuting. Subsequently, the district used a $25,000 federal planning grant to investigate the feasibility of establishing a new community to replace the existing rundown mill town. At the time, the population was about 600. That year, egg-sized hail punched holes through roofs and smashed windows. Unmaintained since the sawmill closed, Sinclair Mills' deteriorating wooden water pipes forced the temporary closure of that school. From the 1972/73 year, the 14 students were bussed 15 miles (24 km) to Upper Fraser. Assumedly the school reopened when the new owner of the Sinclair Mills site restored the infrastructure.

The Mt. Tabor Pastoral Charge of the United Church held occasional services, which developed into a regular Monday night Sunday school and study group from November 1970 to June 1971. November 1971 to July 1972 offered only a Monday night Sunday school. A Monday night Sunday school and service were held during September and October 1972, which changed to a Sunday afternoon service and Monday night Sunday school for the period until June 1973, except January to April, when both activities were held on Sunday.

The town site received water and sewer pipes in the 1970s. The two-storey general store, fronted by two gas pumps, was advertised for sale during 1973–75. By the mid-1970s, the closure of post-offices in smaller communities between Prince George and Hansard, left only the ones at Willow River and Upper Fraser open.

Abe Siemens and Monty Woodley were the first two principals. A report recommended the half-filled dormitory building in Prince George, which housed mostly Upper Fraser students, be replaced by alternative accommodation and/or bussing. Although parents initially favoured retaining the dormitory, opinion quickly shifted to the bussing option. Rehabilitation costs for the deteriorated 35-year-old former army barracks were prohibitive, especially in light of the occupancy rate. At 50 miles (80 km) each way, the bus for Blackburn Junior Secondary operated from 1975. David Bond was the Upper Fraser elementary school principal for two years from the 1975/76 school year. Art Webb followed for 1977/78. The 1978 capital budget was $1,600 for sites, $40,000 for buildings, and $7,500 for equipment.

When the Royal Produce chain encountered financial difficulties, closing most of the stores in 1980, this likely included the Upper Fraser one.

There being no gymnasium for school or community use, School District 57 proposed two more classrooms, a library and a gymnasium be included in the 1980 capital budget, which comprised $61,460 for sites, $718,500 for buildings, and $44,000 for equipment. That year, a surplus teacherage was tendered for sale. Lorne Brown succeeded Rob Howardson as principal for the 1981/82 school year. The classroom/library construction commenced in 1982, with a time capsule buried in the foundations. The RDFFG covering half the almost $500,000 gymnasium cost, the expanded facilities were ready the next year. The two surplus portables were sold.

Thelma & Paul Misiura, son of John & Margaret Misiura of Hansard, ran a general store by the early 1980s. The original general store, which Dave Lee managed as late as October 1980, appears to have ceased operating, because the premises were available for rental two and a half years later.

Having only seven pupils, Sinclair Mills elementary closed permanently and the students assimilated into the 138-member Upper Fraser elementary for the 1983/84 school year. The latter's enrolments had not fallen below 70 during the prior decade.

With highway paving complete, Northwood bussed employees to and from the sawmill, and the Upper Fraser population of around 500 began declining. Barbara Osten became principal for the 1984/85 school year. By this time, bussing for higher grades was to Duchess Park Secondary School.

During the 1985/86 year, 28 students bussed from Aleza Lake and Sinclair Mills to Upper Fraser, but the service ceased the next year owing to insufficient numbers. RDFFG and parental lobbying for the 12 students affected proved unfruitful. Operating at 46 percent student capacity, Upper Fraser's four smaller-sized classes rendered significantly increased costs per student. With 48 enrollments and about 300 residents, further declines were anticipated, and the ongoing costs for the gymnasium became an increasing burden. Parents were concerned about the impact a closure would have on the community.

In 1999, having given 12 months' notice to tenants of the 24 occupied houses, Northwood closed the 30-house town site, leaving a community of 15–20 privately owned homes, including a store. The three times daily free bus service from Prince George continued to serve mill employees. The school board budgeted $45,645 for the removal and disposal of the school buildings and gym.

Although only three students travelled from Sinclair Mills by 2010, parents successfully appealed a proposal to eliminate this section from the Giscome school bus service, and the route remained.

In 2015, Canada Post mandated reduced hours at rural post-offices, such as Upper Fraser. The modest general store/post-office property continues to operate with the Faulkner's granddaughter in charge.

=== Electricity, broadcast transmissions & communications devices ===
During 1964, BC Hydro cleared a right-of-way and constructed high-voltage pylons from Willow River, 32 miles (51 km) north to Summit Lake, and 20 miles (32 km) east to Upper Fraser. The voltage increased to 138,000 on the existing Prince George-Willow River lines, reduced to 60,000 at the Willow River substation, and further reduced to 25,000 at the Upper Fraser substation, before distribution east to Sinclair Mills and west to Newlands. The network primarily served sawmills and other industries, which had formerly generated their own power. In 1970, the whole line was converted to 138,000 volts.

In 1974, an automatic telephone exchange replaced hand cranking and party lines. After a 1981 referendum, telephone subscribers from Salmon Valley to Hansard opted for a fixed monthly charge for toll-free calling to Prince George.

The CRTC approved cable television for the community in 1992, issuing a renewal in 1995.

During the 2010s, fibre optics and satellite introduced high-speed internet connections to the area.

=== Road transport ===
The respective Hansard section covers roadbuilding, the relief camp, road transport, and bus services.
