= Aleza Lake station =

Railway station in British Columbia, Canada

Aleza Lake

General information
- Location: Adjacent to the Highway; Aleza Lake, British Columbia; V0J 2Z0, Canada
- Coordinates: 54°06′54″N 122°03′17″W

Construction
- Structure type: Sign post

History
- Opened: 1914
- Former names: Grand Trunk Pacific Railway

Services
Preceding station	Via Rail	Following station
Willow River toward Prince Rupert	Jasper–Prince Rupert	Upper Fraser toward Jasper

Former services
Preceding station	Canadian National Railway	Following station
Newlands toward Prince Rupert	Prince Rupert – Jasper	Hansard toward Jasper
Location

Aleza Lake station is on the Canadian National Railway mainline in Aleza Lake, British Columbia, Canada. Via Rail's Jasper – Prince Rupert train calls at the station as a flag stop.

== History ==
Aleza Lake, like Newlands to its west and Hansard to its east, was an original train station (1914) on the GTP (the Canadian National Railway after nationalization). It had no station agent. Aleza Lake lies at Mile 108.8, Fraser Subdivision (about Mile 198 during the line's construction). The railhead reached Mile 197 in December 1913. During the following years, some speculated the Edmonton, Dunvegan and British Columbia Railway would continue southwest through the Wapiti Pass, until joining the GTP near Aleza Lake, with the goal of securing running rights westward over that line.

Herman G. Griese (1892–1940) of Shelley (misreported as Edward), section hand (track maintenance), died from a heart attack in the section-house while preparing to go to work.

After passing trains had destroyed 100 head of cattle on the Willow River-Aleza Lake stretch during 1958–63, the CNR erected protective fencing.

A 160-foot washout 1.5 miles (2.4 km) west of Aleza Lake terminated a westbound passenger train at Upper Fraser in spring 1966. Towed through heavy mud and deep holes by bulldozers near Giscome, three buses brought eastbound passengers from Prince George, and returned with the westbound ones. To provisionally bridge the track bed, which had subsided 10 feet, CN crews worked around the clock for four days before reopening the line. Restoration work occurred in 1980, 1984 and 1990.

Built in 1914, the standard-design Plan 100-152 (Bohi's Type E) station building was sold in 1968. An unspecified freight and passenger shelter remained into the 2000s.

The remaining passenger shelter went in 1996.

Trick Lumber/United Forest Prodt. stop (Mile 107.3)
Service	c.1963–1964	1964–1968	1968–1971
Passenger		Flag stop	
Way freight	Flag stop	Flag stop	Flag stop

Aleza Lake stop (Mile 108.8)
Service	1914–c.1921	c.1921–1931	1932–1942	1943–c.1958	c.1959–1965	1965–1966	1966–1977	1977–present
Passenger	Regular stop	Regular stop		Regular stop	Flag stop	Regular stop	Flag stop	Flag stop
Way freight	Flag stop probably	Regular stop	Regular stop	Regular stop	Regular stop	Regular stop	Regular stop	

Siding	Mile No.	1922	1933	1943	1960	1965	1968–72	1977	1990–92
(Capacity Length)		Cars	Cars	Cars	Cars	Cars	Cars	Feet	Feet
Aleza Lake	108.8	67	65	57	52	125	112	5,110	6,080

Other Tracks	Mile No.	1920–22	1933	1943	1960	1965–68
(Capacity Length)		Cars	Cars	Cars	Cars	Cars
Anthony Lumber (logging)	106.2	Unknown				
Gale & Trick	107.3		11			
S.B. Trick Lumber	107.3			14	11	
United Forest Products	107.3					11
