= Aleza Lake, British Columbia =

- Community
- Location of Aleza Lake in British Columbia
- Coordinates: 54°07′00″N 122°02′00″W
- Country: Canada
- Province: British Columbia
- Land District: Cariboo
- Regional District: Fraser-Fort George
- Geographic Region: Robson Valley
- Elevation: 611 m (2,005 ft)
- Time zone: UTC−07:00 (PT)
- Area codes: 250, 778, 236, & 672

Aleza Lake is immediately south of the eastern end of its namesake lake, and west of Upper Fraser, in central British Columbia. The community, which clusters the railway line and highway, comprises 15–20 full-time residents.

== Transportation ==
A trackside signpost marks the flag stop for Via Rail's Jasper – Prince Rupert train. The immediate Via Rail stops are Willow River to the west and Upper Fraser to the east.

== History ==
=== Lakes ===
A prior channel of the Fraser River carved out the oxbow lakes, which comprise Little Lake (west), Aleza Lake (centre) and Hansard Lake (east). Little Lake was also called Hotchkiss Lake, after Thomas & Louise L. Hotchkiss, the first homesteaders on its shores. Long after the family departed, their abandoned log cabin remained standing at the western end of the lake. Memorable features of the medium-sized Aleza Lake were the white water lilies on the south shore and cranberry bogs on the north side. In July 1913, G.U. Ryley, the Grand Trunk Pacific Railway (GTP) Land Commissioner, named the lake after a First Nations woman who lived in the area. She was either elderly, or the daughter of a chief, or a Carrier maiden, or some combination of these attributes. A fast-flowing creek connected to the larger Hansard Lake, which in turn flowed into the Fraser. Like the former train station to the southeast, it was named after Hugh H. Hansard. During the late spring flooding of 1938, the river flowed up the creek system temporarily creating a streak of brown sediment across the surface of Aleza Lake.

=== Railway ===
Aleza Lake, like Newlands to its west and Hansard to its east, was an original train station (1914) on the GTP (the Canadian National Railway after nationalization). It had no station agent. Aleza Lake lies at Mile 108.8, Fraser Subdivision (about Mile 198 during the line's construction). The railhead reached Mile 197 in December 1913. During the following years, some speculated the Edmonton, Dunvegan and British Columbia Railway would continue southwest through the Wapiti Pass, until joining the GTP near Aleza Lake, with the goal of securing running rights westward over that line.

Herman G. Griese (1892–1940) of Shelley (misreported as Edward), section hand (track maintenance), died from a heart attack in the section-house while preparing to go to work.

After passing trains had destroyed 100 head of cattle on the Willow River-Aleza Lake stretch during 1958–63, the CNR erected protective fencing.

A 160-foot washout 1.5 miles (2.4 km) west of Aleza Lake terminated a westbound passenger train at Upper Fraser in spring 1966. Towed through heavy mud and deep holes by bulldozers near Giscome, three buses brought eastbound passengers from Prince George, and returned with the westbound ones. To provisionally bridge the track bed, which had subsided 10 feet, CN crews worked around the clock for four days before reopening the line. Restoration work occurred in 1980, 1984 and 1990.

Built in 1914, the standard-design Plan 100-152 (Bohi's Type E) station building was sold in 1968. An unspecified freight and passenger shelter remained into the 2000s.

The remaining passenger shelter went in 1996.

Trick Lumber/United Forest Prodt. stop (Mile 107.3)
Service	c.1963–1964	1964–1968	1968–1971
Passenger		Flag stop	
Way freight	Flag stop	Flag stop	Flag stop

Aleza Lake stop (Mile 108.8)
Service	1914–c.1921	c.1921–1931	1932–1942	1943–c.1958	c.1959–1965	1965–1966	1966–1977	1977–present
Passenger	Regular stop	Regular stop		Regular stop	Flag stop	Regular stop	Flag stop	Flag stop
Way freight	Flag stop probably	Regular stop	Regular stop	Regular stop	Regular stop	Regular stop	Regular stop	

Siding	Mile No.	1922	1933	1943	1960	1965	1968–72	1977	1990–92
(Capacity Length)		Cars	Cars	Cars	Cars	Cars	Cars	Feet	Feet
Aleza Lake	108.8	67	65	57	52	125	112	5,110	6,080

Other Tracks	Mile No.	1920–22	1933	1943	1960	1965–68
(Capacity Length)		Cars	Cars	Cars	Cars	Cars
Anthony Lumber (logging)	106.2	Unknown				
Gale & Trick	107.3		11			
S.B. Trick Lumber	107.3			14	11	
United Forest Products	107.3					11

=== Pioneers ===
From 1912 until his death, Jabez W. Smith (c.1863–1941) farmed on the northwestern shore of the lake. His son and daughter-in-law, Sidney (Sid) J. (1886–1975) & Mary (1888–1979) Smith, joined him in 1924. Their strawberry crop was famous. Their homesteads were a two-mile (3.2 km) walk around the east end of the lake from the village, but a shorter distance by boat in summer or across the ice in winter. Sid was primarily a trapper, and in 1932, they moved into the town site. Relocating to Vancouver in 1942, they returned in the late 1940s. Sid was a long time employee at S.B. Trick Lumber. Daughter Grace E. married Tom Dilworth in 1935. Son Wilfrid married Alice McNeill, and they initially stayed. Daughter Margaret R. joined the RCAF, and married Frederick William Blake of Florida. Son L. Archie married Kathleen (Kathy) M. Neil (1930–2014) of Giscome in 1950, where the couple settled.

Alexander (Alex) (1880–1965) & Sarah (1890–1974) McDowell, who arrived in 1914, raised their 15 children in the homestead southwest of the west switch (Mile 108.9). The couple retired to Prince George in 1957. Daughter Violet married Arnold John Brandner (1908–68) (Melvin's brother), but the couple remained only a few years at Aleza Lake. Son Ernest (Ernie) A. (1929–2017) married Coreen Gervais. The couple stayed at least until the end of the 1990s, and likely beyond. Daughter Ida May married Haydn Wilson and the couple resided in Prince George.

J.A. Davidson was the inaugural postmaster 1915–20. His small store, located adjacent to the west switch, closed when the family left the area. When Rev. W.J. Patton visited in the summer of 1918, he calculated the population as 50. Around 1917, Andrew (Andy) (c.1884–1943) & Mary (c.1884–1942) Young, Roy Billings, and Mac McGibbons, settled on plots 2.5 miles (4.0 km) south in the hills, but they abandoned these holdings by 1920. Only the Youngs resettled in the village, living south of the tracks at Mile 108.6. A section hand for the railway, Andy maintained a small farm, and was the school janitor. On one occasion, a train collided with their handcar putting Andy in a coma for weeks and in hospital for months. He served as the local commissioner under the Provincial Elections Act. Mary was the Sunday school teacher, the unofficial nurse, and boarded teachers. When the railway transferred Andy to Fraser Lake, the family relocated.

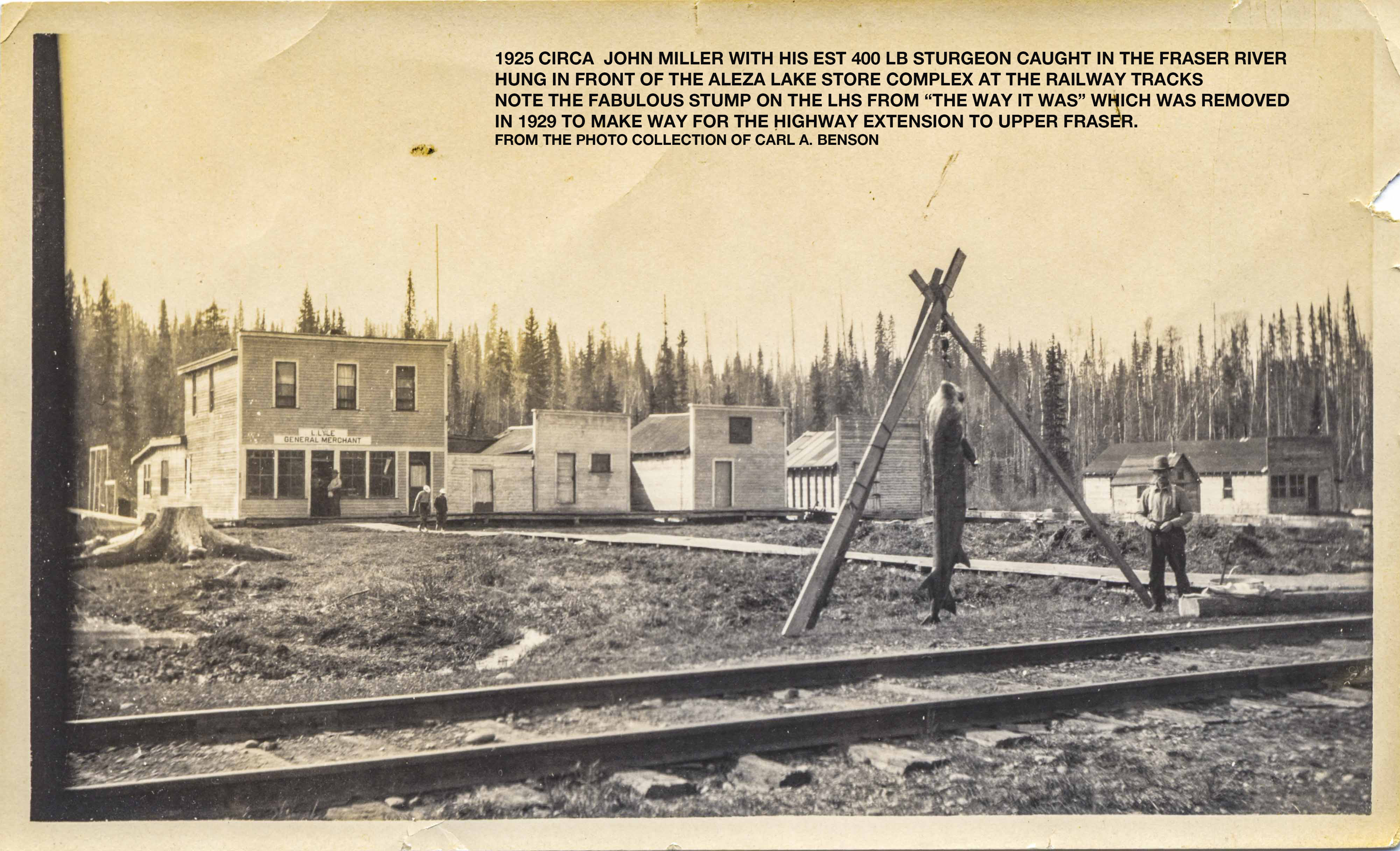
In foreground railway, in background main street, Aleza Lake, c.1925.

Lorne A.S. (1884–1955) & Nita M. (1896–1947) Lyle arrived in 1917. Their four daughters raised there were Ethelwynne, Lorita, Nelda and Lois. Buying a central lot south of the tracks at Mile 108.7, Lorne erected a two-storey store, which he ran (1918–21; 1923–50), and became postmaster (1920–21; 1923–50). Commonly, the postmaster in such towns was also a storeowner. Selling the store to Joseph Thomas Norquay (1874–1962), postmaster 1922–23, the Lyles travelled. Following customer dissatisfaction and unpaid purchase instalments, Lyle repossessed the business in 1923. The living quarters occupied the upper level and the rear of the lower level. He constructed a wooden sidewalk out to the tracks. The later enlargement of the store complex included additional buildings for a butchery, flour and feed storage, a warehouse, woodshed, and workshop. The record selection for the store's gramophone entertained customers throughout the 1920s, 1930s and 1940s. Lyle acted as the unofficial mayor.

Ethelwynne (Ethel) (1917–2011) married Neil M. MacArthur (1913–2011), a logging truck driver for S.B. Trick Lumber. After relocating to Prince George in 1949, they owned and operated several successful construction companies, and Ethel later wrote a slender volume outlining a history of Aleza Lake. Lorita married Gordon Earl Larson, but they left in the early 1950s. After Nelda M. married William (Bill) Earl Hein, they settled in Prince George, as did Lois L. on marrying William Charles Thompson.

The 1920 population estimate was 150. South of the west switch, the former small cemetery occupies the hillside. Lorne Lyle provided this land in 1919, when the influenza epidemic took several residents' lives. Over the years, carpenters used the store workshop to manufacture coffins. The only identifiable grave is for Winnifred Byrne, who died in childbirth, the date unknown. Frederick "Eugene" Schmolke (c.1896–1935) was a drowning victim. Containing about 20 graves, records no longer exist for the other burials. Some restoration work took place at the site in the late 1980s.

A number of homesteaders came after World War I. Arthur (Art) G. (1887–1953) & Glory A. Williams operated a small dairy farm on the north shore of the lake, which supplied the community until they left in the late 1930s. Art was the section foreman for the railway. Their children were Betty (1920–89), Dorothy, and A. Bentley (1924–87). Betty would later recount their frugal childhoods. Harry Jackson, who farmed on the south shore, was known for his oat crop and nine-foot high timothy-grass with 10-inch heads. In 1930, he drowned near the Monkman Pass.

Erected on the hillside south of the east switch (Mile 108.3), the school opened before the final term of 1921. With an enrolment of 10 students, Miss Annie Johnson, the first teacher, left at the end of that term. The one-room building, at the east end of the boardwalk through the town, was also the venue for Christmas concerts, card evenings, bridal showers, and occasional Saturday night dances during the early years. A gramophone provided music for the dances and student Phys Ed. Residents were always welcome at the dances held in neighbouring communities.

Fred M. & Agnes M. (c.1879–1941) Phillips, who arrived in 1920, homesteaded on the north shore of Little Lake. Fred was a section hand for the railway, and stayed until the mid-1940s. Their twin daughters, Maude and Mabel (1915–42), commenced school at age five in order to boost the enrolment number to the required minimum of 10 for government funding. Mabel married Ego Bjorklund (1901–83). Maude married Otto E. Leboe (1908–78), but a few years later, in 1942, they relocated to Prince George.

The fertile land favoured ranching in the area, but one settler left farming for mining, when his chickens unearthed a gold nugget. Trapper Matt Hilton (c.1876–1921), who had a cabin about four miles (6.4 km) to the south, succumbed to his poor health and perished outdoors in the extreme winter cold. Resident trapper F. Martin (Deafy) Dayton (1886–1940), formerly at Kidd, promoted his big game hunting guide, before returning to Kidd. Prior to Ole Hansen's (1892–1974) move to Hansard, he spent the 1920s at Aleza Lake. Local trapper William Youst (1898–1951) lived alone in north-central BC from the early 1920s. The area was known for its moonshiners, but during the 1930s, Youst's illegal still netted him a $100 fine or three months in jail. Another permanent resident was farmer and trapper John Miller, who operated a laundry during the early 1920s. Trapper Johan (John) (Old Caribou) Bergstrom (1890–1969) lived alone in a shack just west of the store, which children would frequent after school. At their urging, he would take them swimming or fishing. Parents were appreciative that he not only kept the youngsters safe, but also taught them to swim. When he returned from a winter of trapping, the children would rush to greet him.

In 1921, Louis Braaten (1896–1983), a farmer/trapper, opened a poolroom, immediately southwest of the store, which he sold to Charles (Charlie) O. Robson (1899–1967), who left a few years later. Living north of the tracks at Mile 108.6, William E. (Bill) (1884–1955) & Eva Mary (1884–1956) Range, and their six children, were residents 1923–40. Bill spent 16 years employed at Lyle's store. He opened the premises at 8:00 a.m. and closed at 8:00 p.m. Their tiny premature baby girl survived with home care alone. Son Kenneth (1916–88) married Sandra Viola Thorne (1920–91), and they remained until about 1947.

Herbert (1873–1945) & Laura (?–1935) Boomhower and their younger children arrived in 1924. Their log cabin, one of the earliest buildings in the village itself, was on the hill south of the tracks at Mile 108.5. During the later 1930s, son Arnold I. and daughter Hazel provided music for the community dances. Son Carl E. (1896–1970) was a carpenter, and his wife Nellie (1896–1977) boarded the teachers after the Youngs left. Daughter Eva May (1893–1960), who married Edward (Ed) D. Bolen (1878–1962) in 1911, followed her parents to the village. After the latter's daughter Violet (1920–71) married Eric (Erik alternate spelling) Hedman (1898–1950), the couple remained. Their son Edward John (1937–40) drowned in a telephone posthole at almost three-years-old. After Eric died, Violet married Raymond Blangy (1926–83) from Kidd the following month. Six months later, the couple and their three children briefly moved to Summit Lake, before settling in Prince George.

Ed Boomhower's horse team and wagon provided transportation services. They relocated to Prince George in 1959. Arnold (1913–79) married Genevieve Churchman (1916–98), the schoolteacher, and they settled in Prince George. After marriage, two of Herbert's other daughters initially stayed in Aleza Lake. Letia I. (1908–98) married T. Howard Blackburn (1903–92) (son of Hugh & Jane Ann), but they moved to Prince George in the early 1940s. Hazel (1915–76) married James (Jim) D. Smith (1908–80) and they appear to have left in the early 1950s. Son Ray (?–1945) lived near Hansard during World War II. Herbert moved to that locality around this time, though he spent a period with daughter Eva.

Ernest Lloyd (1873–1949) & Esther (1883–1956) Gardiner lived east of the school. In 1925, the couple lost an infant child. When daughter Barbara Esther (c.1919–?) married William (Bill) E. (c.1902–?) Smith, the couple initially remained, as did daughter H. Joyce (c.1923–?) on marrying Melvin B. Brandner (1912–83) (Arnold's brother).

Charles Stewart (1853–1932) was a pioneer farmer in the locality. A resident 1925–50, John Zufelt (1878–1950) was a labourer and millworker.

New sports facilities included a baseball diamond and grandstand north of the railway tracks at Mile 108.7, and a covered hockey/skating rink, south of the tracks at Mile 108.4. In 1925, a passenger car attached to local freight train brought visitors from Prince George, and intermediate points, to the Aleza Lake Ice Carnival & Dance. Owing to warmer weather the following year, a masquerade ball replaced the carnival. The hockey team, drawn from several speedy players along the line, proved a real match for the formidable Prince George side. Equally, the local baseball team ranked respectably in the league. When strong winds destroyed the covered rink, the lumber was recycled. Apparently rebuilt, the weight of snow collapsed the roof during the Great Depression.

J. King Gordon, missionary in charge of Giscome United Church, travelled by train to hold monthly church services during 1926. Possibly, these are one and the same as those reported as Lutheran. During the 1920s, Anglican and Pentecostal ministers also held services, with the Anglican ones continuing throughout the 1930s and 1940s. The community supported both an athletic association and dramatic society. The population, which included logging camps, then numbered between 200 and 275.

Lyle built the small Aleza Lake Hotel, which opened just east of the store in 1926. Part of the upper floor was a dance hall. Charles (Charlie) O. Robson, the initial manager, applied for the liquor licence. Joe Nosick (Nosik alternate spelling), a trapper based in the settlement, was among a series of managers of the establishment that burned to the ground in 1929. Nita Lyle and other temperance women delayed the rebuilding project for two years.

=== Later Community ===
Siblings Felix (1896–1968), Ego (1901–83), and A. Edwin (1910–77) Bjorklund arrived in the early 1930s. Felix had married Josephine Maria Norbia (1887–1967). Although soon separated and divorced, they remained residents until death. Josephine operated a small restaurant during the 1930s. Ego married Mabel Phillips (1915–42), but they had relocated to two miles (3.2 km) southeast of Newlands by the time of her death. Their children were C. Albin (1934–91), Egan (c.1935–c.2005), Hilda, Everett (c.1938–?), and Harold (c.1940–1943). Ego married Irma Olsen (1900–69) his housekeeper. The family returned to Aleza Lake, where Ego and Ray Olsen were in the lumber business and ran a small mill. Irma remained a resident until death. A. Edwin married local Ester Maria Norrbin (1911–2000). Edwin was a resident until death. Like his father, only child Leonard E. (1932–72) died of a heart attack.

A dance hall, constructed immediately southwest of the store, hosted shows and community events. On the same site, Joe Nosick operated a store/poolroom/bar during the mid-1930s. At various times, all these buildings burned to the ground. A Chinese laundry existed in the late 1930s.

Thomas (Tom) H. Dilworth (1909–93) worked 1933–50 at S.B. Trick Lumber. His later career included being general superintendent at Prince George Planing Mills, president of the Northern Interior Lumbermen's Association (1956–57), and general manager for Lakeland Mills. In 1935, Tom married Grace E. Smith (1917–2014). That year, M. Herbert (1907–63) & Leona E. (1908–87) Cook settled in the area. Trapper Herbert, Leona, and son Ben, spent the early 1940s in Hansard and then Shelley. Herbert, who was an Aleza Lake patrol officer with the forest service in 1948, became a licensed hunting guide. Ben later moved to Prince George and was also a guide.

By the mid-to-late-1930s, a Girl Guide company, with brownies, existed. Lorne Lyle cleared the underbrush beside the lake, west of the village to create a park. He built a community hall, a wharf, changing rooms, diving tower and children's pool. Offering bathing facilities, cabins and a dance hall, the popular resort attracted outside visitors. The Saturday night dances were the highlight of the week. By the 1970s, merely overgrown vegetation covered the same area. Lyle was also a strong advocate for the Monkman Pass Highway Association, and organized a fundraising dance in the hall.

Taking over as section foreman in the late 1930s, Nicholas (Nick) (1888–1969) & Olena (Helen or Elaine) (1901–86) Wozney and children stayed until 1953. They also operated the small dairy farm, which supplied milk and cheese to the community after the Williams left. Daughter Elsie married Arthur (Art) C. Purdue. Son Walter, born and brought up at Aleza Lake, who left for further education and work, later emigrated to New Zealand.

Peter (Pete) Podrapovich (1900–89), who worked 1937–65 at S.B. Trick Lumber, was a 52-year resident on his death.

Around 1940, E. Harold (Harry) (1892–1984) & Leona May Jane (c.1905–92) Purdue arrived. Harry worked at S.B. Trick Lumber until they left in 1952. On marriage, son Allan H. (1923–2004) and Dorothy D. Gervais (1933–92) remained residents. Son Arthur (Art) C. (1928–90) married Elsie Wozney (1933–2002).

Rose (né Domonkos [1921–2017], formerly at Shelley), & Andrew (Andy) (1906–91) Gaal (brother to Steve Gaal of Willow River) resided 1940–59. When Andy skidded on ice and collided with another vehicle in a 1942 auto accident, Rose suffered bruises and shock, and Nellie Boomhower broke her collarbone. During World War II, the community hall hosted Red Cross benefit dances. Including temporary workers, the population was almost 200 in the mid-1940s. About this time, Lyle opened a Home Oil two-pump gas station to the east side of the store.

Prior to John (Jack) E. (1899–1980) & Sarah (1900–86) Ovington relocating to Prince George, then Penticton, three of their children enlisted. J. Kenneth, the eldest son, married in England. Roy E. (1925–44) was killed on active service In France. Sarah Bernice served in the RCAF. In 1946, she married a civil servant posted to Trinidad. Returning to Aleza Lake, her father and cousin, Thomas Thompson, started a small sawmill. This venture appears short-lived, because Ovington relocated to Prince George in late 1947. That year, the athletic club built an ice rink and planned a hockey team. R. Eley (1912–88) & Pearl V. (1906–98) Gervais remained residents from that time until their deaths. Daughter Coreen married Ernie A. McDowell. Daughter Dorothy D. married Allan H. Purdue. Son, Ronald Martin (1944–56) died in a bicycle accident. Son, Robert C. married Shirley Darlene Brantnall of Newlands and remained long-term at Aleza Lake.

A small Catholic Church, built east of the Gardiner house on the hillside outside of the village, was active from 1949 to 1999. In 2004, the current owners partially dismantled, moved, and reconstructed, the dilapidated building on their Hutton property.

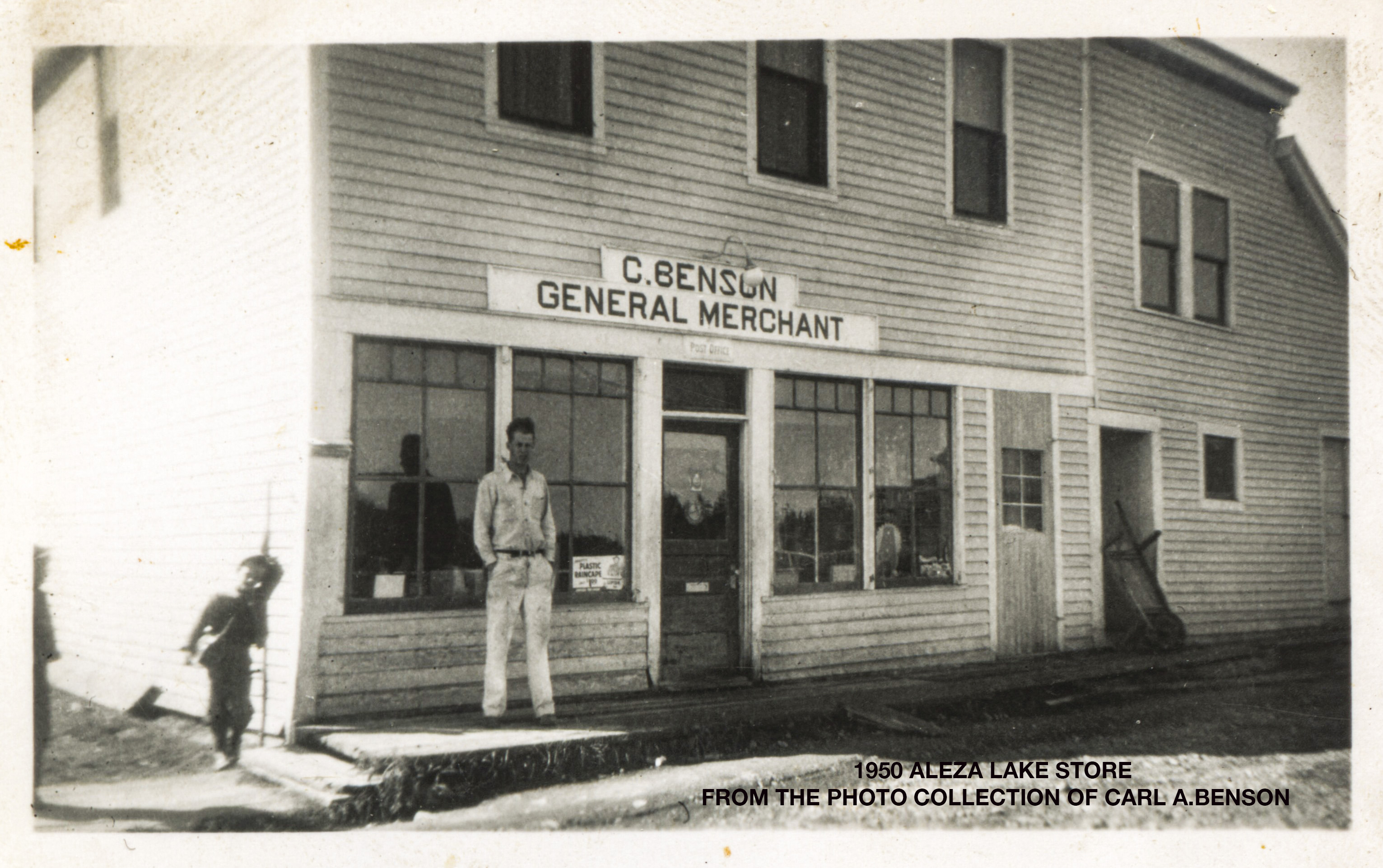
General store, Aleza Lake, 1950.

In late 1949, Oscar (1889–1950) & Siri (1893–1978) Benson from Bend, and their son Carl A. Benson in Penny, bought the store, and Lorne Lyle built a new house for his retirement. Carl was postmaster 1950–52. In poor health, Oscar died within the year and Siri retired to Prince George. The next year, Carl fractured his ribs when he collided with an Imperial Oil truck on the Giscome-Newlands road. His two passengers escaped serious injury. That spring, Carl (1928–2015) married Lorri Tanis (Lida) Deszcz (1931–2012) of Penny, and they left 8 months later for Prince George.

The school installed a new coal heater in 1950, following a winter when the teacher, M. Dupris, had closed the school for several days while he stayed in Prince George to escape the extreme cold. Dupris left for Tabor Creek School during summer recess. In 1954, the rural construction program added a further classroom.

Around 1950, John (1912–87) & Lillian I. (1918–94) Dyck arrived, where they remained until death. Their four daughters and two sons were born during the 1940s and 1950s. In 1962, daughter Leona Pearl married Joffre (Jeff) B. Poulin, an employee at S.B. Trick Lumber.

During 1952, Clifford (Cliff) W. Tuckey (1900–82) bought the store and was postmaster 1952–56. Rolf A. (1907–92) & Kathleen (Kit) L.E. (1916–2014) Hellenius arrived with their four boys about this time. Son Peter and daughter Annemarie were born during the following years. Rolf worked at the Experiment Station, and Kit taught at the school for a time. Rolf began a Scout troop in 1956. As well as scouts and cubs, guide and brownie groups existed for the girls. Rolf continued as scoutmaster into the 1960s, and was also a volunteer weather observer. The family left in the late 1960s when Rolf became superintendent at the Red Rock nursery.

Samuel J. Boyd (possibly 1908–78) was storeowner and postmaster 1957–61. Patrick M. Scully (alternate spellings Skully or Skulley) owned the store until its closure and demolition in the mid-1970s, and was the final postmaster 1961–70. In 1968, he was fined for not keeping adequate Unemployment Insurance Commission records. He remains a resident.

Student enrolments ranged 24–36 in the late 1940s, 28–43 in the 1950s, and 29–40 in the early 1960s. The school closed in 1964, with students bussed to Upper Fraser. The school board adhered strictly to its policy of not extending a bus run for less than 10 children. School District 57 disposed of the surplus school site in 1985. During the 1985/86 year, 28 students bussed from Aleza Lake and Sinclair Mills to Upper Fraser, but the service ceased the next year owing to insufficient numbers. During the 1989/90 winter, the school bus service was reinstated temporarily. The closure of the Upper Fraser school meant bussing to Giscome Elementary from the 1998/99 year.

=== Forestry Companies ===
The narrow strip of accessible spruce forest bordering the railway that stretched some 100 miles (160 km) east of Prince George was known as the East Line. J. Ruttan (probably c.1863–1935), who moved his small mill from Vanderhoof to the western end of Hansard Lake, operated 1917–c.1919, before relocating.

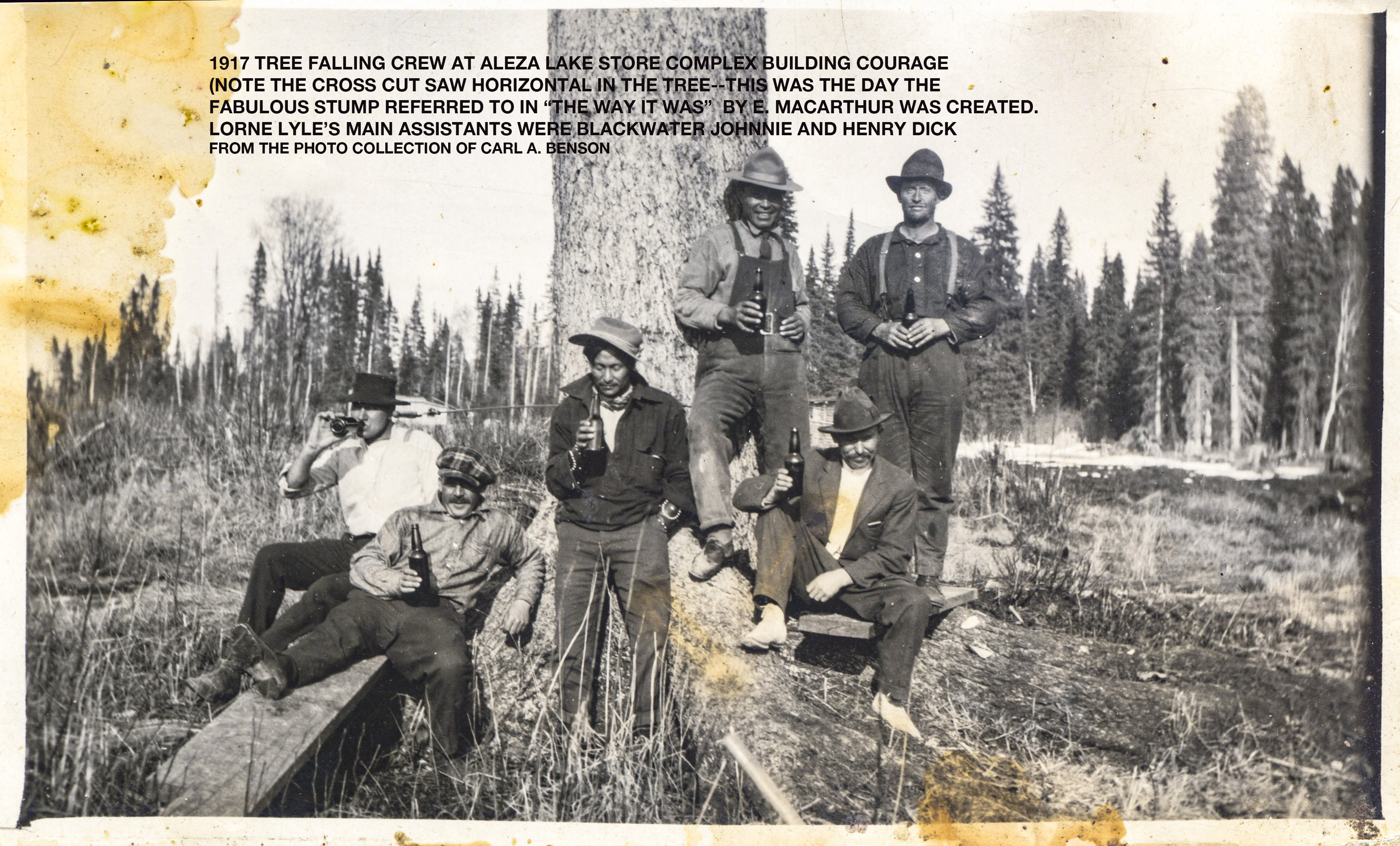
Tree falling crew, Aleza Lake, 1917.

In the fall of 1917, Arnold K. Shives (1883–1962) opened the 30,000-foot shift capacity Aleza Lake Sawmills, on the lake, northwest of the west switch. Although company president, he and wife Claire (1889–1957) remained Prince George residents until the mid-1920s, where he was a violinist with the orchestra, and vice-president of the Upper Fraser Spruce Manufacturers Association. He also pursued lumber interests in Shelley.

In 1919, the liquidator of the Hansard Lake Lumber Co., 1.5 miles (2.4 km) east of the community, sought to sell or lease the mill. Before the corrugated iron exterior and interior of the company buildings at Willow River could be sold, thieves stole the sheets. Sawmill machinery and equipment remained in storage in Prince George as late as 1921. By then, the Anthony Lumber Co. had acquired the Hansard Lake facilities. Its capacity of 15,000–20,000 feet, compared to the Aleza Lake mill's 35,000–40,000 feet. With a mill crew of 25, the latter joined Giscome and Hutton as the dominant mills on the East Line.

In the 1920s, with logging limited to the winter and fall seasons to facilitate the hauling of logs over snow and ice, loggers were transient. However, year-round work existed in sawmill towns such as Giscome, Aleza Lake, Hutton, Penny and Longworth. Injuries and death were common in sawmills and logging camps. In 1922 at the Anthony mill, a piece of wood ejected by the edger, which embedded in the muscles of a worker's thigh, required surgical removal. A 1922 fire totally destroyed the Aleza Lake mill, but the lumber in the yards was saved. The following year, Mr. Klingaman from Edmonton acquired the Anthony mill, and settled property tax arrears after the government seized company assets. Hugh Blackburn and Percy Hasselfield, of Bannock, Saskatchewan, purchased the Aleza Lake mill site and timber. Their private residences were south of the track near Miles 108.4 and 108.5 respectively. Operating as the Northland Spruce Lumber Co., the company logged in the vicinity that winter and relocated their 40,000-foot capacity Bannock mill to the site in spring 1924. The upgraded 50,000-foot capacity mill commenced cutting that summer. A 1926 fire on the mill property destroyed the blacksmith shop. Months later, Harvey Small Jr. slipped and drowned while manoeuvering logs on the lake. Three years later, his parents faced further tragedy when their married daughter died from an illness. Eight horse teams hauled logs along pole roads to the mill.

In late 1927, the insolvent company ceased operating, and the sheriff seized its assets and those of its logging contractor, Liersch Logging Co., because of outstanding wages, creditors' accounts, stumpages and royalties. Unsecured creditors expected to receive little to nothing. The advertised assets attracted some sales, Northland Spruce declared bankruptcy, and Liersch Logging faced further seizures. The Lyle Lumber Co. constructed and began operating a 25,000-foot capacity mill. The millpond was an intact dam that Northland Spruce had installed previously on the creek. Clydesdale horses hauled the logs across the frozen lake from a logging point to the west.

In 1929, Gale & Trick opened a 60,000-foot capacity sawmill at the former Anthony site on Hansard Lake. Built with new machinery, the output helped satisfy the Oshawa company's exclusive contract to supply General Motors Canada with wooden packing crates for shipping vehicles. The facility included a cookhouse, two bunkhouses, a warehouse and office building. Initially logging at the east end of Hansard Lake, the company employed a mill crew of 60–80 and about 100 loggers. The enterprise joined Giscome and Sinclair Mills as the dominant mills on the East Line. With lumber demand declining prior to the Great Depression, Lyle closed his mill, and put up for sale the machinery. That November, falling tree limbs fatally fractured the skull of John Swanson, a Gale & Trick logger.

Reduced demand in the auto industry dramatically shortened the 1930 sawmill season. The next year, fire totally destroyed the mill. The Forestry Service's firefighting equipment could only save the dressing plant. After a period of uncertainty, and a dissolution of the partnership, Samuel Bailey Trick (c.1871–1941) announced plans to rebuild. In the mid-1930s, the four major sawmills were Giscome Mills, Sinclair Mills, Thrasher Lumber at Snowshoe, and S.B. Trick Lumber of Aleza Lake. When owner, S.B. Trick, died of pneumonia, his son, Ambrose J.E. Trick (1905–92), and son-in-law, Harry Morison (1902–59), president and secretary respectively, became partners in the venture. Their families joined them for the summer months.

Unsold Northland Spruce machinery at Aleza Lake attracted thieves in 1934 and 1937. In 1936, Lyle re-established his sawmilling enterprise as the L. Lyle Lumber Co. He welcomed and entertained the Prince George Board of Trade delegation on their 1937 tour, and conducted a tour of his 30,000-foot capacity mill. The group also visited the 45,000-foot capacity S.B. Trick mill. In 1941, when Lyle sold his mill to A. A. Monroe for dismantling and shipment to five miles (8 km) west of McBride, the freight car transporting the machinery derailed. Aleza Lake Mills was incorporated in 1944. Similar to Willow River, Hutton, and other mills, S.B. Trick Lumber worked year round to meet the World War II demands. In 1946, a logger suffered four fractured ribs when struck by a falling tree. The next year, when Adolf Bruestle (previously of Upper Fraser) mangled his hand at Aleza Lake Mills, resultant surgery amputated the thumb and forefinger. Assumedly, this is the same Adolphe Bruestle (1906–80), who received a two-year suspended sentence in 1966 for an indecent assault.

In 1958, United Forest Products purchased the 75,000-foot capacity S.B. Trick Lumber Co. mill. The following year, Harry Morison, former secretary, died of a heart attack. Ambrose Trick spent his remaining years involved in community activities in Prince George. Son John (1929–2016) & Bernice Trick followed in 1962.

In 1962, a logger suffered a crushed chest. During 1963, United Forest Products received a $100 fine for contravening the Hours of Work Act, a sawdust pile at an abandoned mill caught fire, and the carrier of a log conveyor at the S.B. Trick mill fatally crushed sawyer Thomas Thompson (1912–63). Two significant mill fires occurred during the following months. National Forest Products, then Northwood acquired the bankrupt mill, but instead of the announced doubling of production, the mill closed in 1965. The new owners removed all but one camp house. In 1966, Richard and Black advertised for sale their small sawmill. The IWA laid charges against United Forest Products for failing to cover employee medical coverage obligations. Joseph Korodi, 60, an officer of that company, received a two-year suspended sentence for filing false insurance claims with respect to the 1963 fire.

=== Forestry Service & Aleza Lake Experiment Station ===
Both south of the tracks, the forest ranger base was at Mile 108.6, and the Experiment Station was 1.5 miles (2.4 km) west of the village. The station initially comprised 6,100 acres of mature forest and 200 acres of cutover land. In 1923, Bob St. Clair, Assistant Chief Forester for the BC Forest Service, proposed the establishment of two research stations, one to be located on the southern coast, and the other in the northern interior along the GTP route. The latter opening in 1924, Percy M. Barr planned and supervised the fieldwork in establishing sample plots for a demonstration forest, familiarizing himself with all nearby sawmills, and in jointly setting the boundaries for the station. The 1925 construction program comprised a road, several miles of fire protection trails, and a cabin for field crews. By the fall, tent facilities could accommodate and feed over 40 people. Progress during 1926 included an improved road, further trails, and a second building to house field staff. Logging commenced in the 1926/27 winter, followed by the erection of a fire lookout tower in the summer. The ground prepared that summer, the first sowings in the small nursery took place in 1928. In the fall, the site hosted a workshop for forestry rangers from the Northern Interior. The 1929 additions comprised the foreman's house, a cookhouse, and a barn.

Although Roy Sansom, the station foreman, resided year-round, the 15–20 other staff left before winter. Roy was also the resident forest ranger. C.D. Orchard, who became Chief Forester in the 1940s, held this position earlier in the 1920s. During the 1930s and 1940s, the ranger was based at Aleza Lake and the assistant in Giscome or vice versa, before gravitating permanently to Aleza Lake.

The complete collapse of the local forest industry during the Great Depression, which had diminished the 1929/30 winter logging cut, precipitated cancellation thereafter, but research plots continued to be established and regularly remeasured. Barr, the driving force behind the station, left in 1932 to teach at Berkeley. In 1934, the building windows were boarded and the station closed. Roy Sansom became the ranger at McBride. By the summer of 1936, there were only two people in the head office Research Division, which ceased as a separate entity in 1939.

In 1935, the province initiated the Young Men's Forestry Training Program (YMFTP), a relief program through which the BC Forest Service received $90,000. After gearing up in 1935, the Aleza Lake Experiment Station was allotted $11,000 in 1936, when about 50 men aged 18–25 arrived. The work crews strung a telephone line and built a dam to provide a reliable water supply. They installed a power plant and electrical wiring to service all the camp buildings. New buildings were constructed and older ones repaired or upgraded. The team improved the main road, installed cribbing and culverts, and developed a network of forest trails. However, the research activities were not reactivated and the research residence remained shuttered. The onset of World War II ended relief programs and the forestry buildings were again boarded up. Beyond some plot measurements in 1943, little happened at the station during the War.

Reactivated for year round research purposes, a residence, office and stores building, and four-car garage were constructed at Aleza Lake in 1949. Determining sustainable yield logging was the goal. During the summer months, Lawrence (Larry) A. deGrace (1914–72) managed a 25-person crew, plus about a dozen local high school boys. While on their forest training course, a group of these boys was instrumental in rescuing a forestry engineer, who gashed his leg with an axe. In 1952, deGrace left government for the private sector. Industrial Forestry Service Ltd., the consultancy he established, grew to be one of the largest in North America.

Closed in 1963, the buildings that could not be relocated were burned to the ground. After development began on the Red Rock nursery in 1966, the small Aleza Lake nursery gradually phased out. The ranger station closed permanently in 1980, and the four-car garage, fuel shed, old powerhouse and two trailers porches, sold. The two-storey house was removed in 1990.

=== Aleza Lake Research Forest ===
Officially reopened in 1992, plot remeasurements began the previous year with the expectation graduate students would do masters and doctoral theses on the research conducted. The development of better road access, more trails, and trail signs, equally benefitted hikers and various educational programs. Experiments identified optimum species mix, planting techniques, fertilizer use, and protection from disease, insects and animals. It is the longest-studied forest in the north and includes a 300-hectare ecological reserve that preserves a cross section of old-growth forest.

A ten-year detailed strategic planning framework was produced. In 1999, UNBC and UBC assumed control of the research forest, which became the Aleza Lake Research Forest Society.

Opened in 2016, the Aleza Field Education Centre is a 1,200 square-foot interpretive centre of log and timber construction, which offers some overnight accommodation facilities. Designed to host field courses, meetings, retreats, training, and community events, the building is available for educational and training events held by elementary and high school classes, community groups, the forest sector and local industry.

The Aleza Lake Research Forest is a 9,000-hectare outdoor facility, which provides field research opportunities in ecosystem and resource management studies. The research and education programs emphasize harvest systems, biological diversity, climate change, and environmental monitoring.

=== Road Transport ===
A wagon road west to Newlands emerged by the early 1920s. In 1928, the opening of the highway between Giscome and Newlands, along the northern shore of Eaglet lake, connected Aleza Lake with Prince George, with completion the following year when two miles (3.2 km) of new work bypassed the railway tote road. Regarding the highway east of the village, the respective Hansard section covers the subsequent roadbuilding.

Depression-era relief projects included two highway construction camps, which operated during 1931 near Aleza Lake, with two additional ones planned. When the big camp at Penny split into three, some of the men came to Mile 111. When worker discontent escalated, the men at the Hansard and Mile 111 camps refused to work. These camps closed, but the Hudson Bay Spur (Upper Fraser) one appears to have remained open. The Prince George-Hansard weekend bus service, whose intermediate stops included Aleza Lake and the S.B. Trick mill, appears short lived.

In 1947, the road west to Giscome was impassable even in summer. Two years later, reconstruction through muskeg in the vicinity, and a shortage of gravel, created road conditions that bogged down even Caterpillar tractors and required the winching of trucks. One summer weekend in 1950, having previously endured near impassable muddy conditions, volunteers from the district used public works equipment to rehabilitate the road significantly. Gravelling on the Newlands-Aleza Lake section occurred in the fall, and progress continued as far east as the S. B. Trick mill. However, in springtime, the road remained a challenge for even four-wheel-drive vehicles, because the swampy, low-lying area became thick with mud when temperatures rose above freezing. Even in summer, the frequent potholes east of the Newlands slowed car speeds to 5 mph (8 km/h). Throughout the 1960s and 1970s, Prince George Transit ran special buses three times a week between Prince George and McGregor, which assumedly also stopped at Aleza Lake.

Paving promised for 1979 was delayed until 1980 and limited to a 10-kilometre (6.2 mi) section east from Giscome. In 1980, tight curves were eliminated and sharp shale gravel added around Newlands. During 1981, rebuilding and gravelling reached Upper Fraser, with paving promised the next year. In 1983 came fulfillment with the hardtop extended 24 kilometres (15 mi) east through Aleza Lake to Upper Fraser, providing a paved surface from Prince George. The Prince George-Upper Fraser Northwood bus served employees and possibly others. With the privatization of highway maintenance in 1988, Yellowhead Road and Bridge took over the Highways depot (Mile 109.1). In 1991, asphalt grinding, removing, recycling, and top lift paving, occurred on significant stretches of deteriorated paving. A decade later, the paving westward was again crumbling.

=== Electricity, Broadcast Transmissions & Communications Devices ===
The early telegraph office likely relied upon automatic printing apparatus, because there was no dispatcher at this station. By 1921, the railway was stringing telephone wires east of Prince George as far as Hutton, connecting mills and farms along the route with the outside world. Initially, only the railway station and store had telephones. A gap in the line east of Aleza Lake, which remained into the following years, prompted demands for lines separate from the railway's ones. In 1924, Lorne Lyle entertained the whole settlement when he introduced the first radio, which was a crystal set audible with earphones. Within years, most everyone had high antennas and battery-operated radios.

The respective Upper Fraser section outlines the 1974 installation of an automatic telephone exchange, and the 1964 project that provided electricity to the village from the transmission line to Newlands. Engaged at the right-of-way for the high voltage extension, a helicopter brought an injured BC Hydro surveyor to hospital in Prince George.
