= Hansard (railway point) =

Hansard, British Columbia
- Railway Point
- Location of Hansard in British Columbia
- Coordinates: 54°05′00″N 121°52′00″W
- Country: Canada
- Province: British Columbia
- Land District: Cariboo
- Regional District: Fraser-Fort George
- Geographic Region: Robson Valley
- Elevation: 611 m (2,005 ft)
- Area codes: 250, 778, 236, & 672

Hansard station existed on the southwest side of the Fraser River 2.8 miles (4.5 km) northwest of the Bowron River confluence, and 4 miles (6.4 km) southeast of Upper Fraser, in central British Columbia. The namesake small community to its northwest has since dispersed.

== History ==
=== Railway ===
When the National Transcontinental Railway's link to the BC coast was proposed, its expected course was through what became Grande Prairie, then southwest through the Wapiti Pass and what became Hansard. Although the Grand Trunk Pacific Railway (GTP) surveyed the same pass during 1904–1906, the Yellowhead Pass was the final choice. Subsequently, a series of different proposals to route a line via the Monkman Pass and Hansard never eventuated.

Hansard, like Aleza Lake to its northwest, and Dewey to its southeast, was an original train station (1914) on the GTP (the Canadian National Railway after nationalization). Hansard village nestled around Mile 101. The railway crossing is at Mile 100.39. The station was at Mile 100.2, Fraser Subdivision (about Mile 190 during the line's construction), and the CNR Hansard Bridge spans at Mile 99.1 (formerly 189).

George Prudente (1884–1949), a foreman during the construction era, became the Hansard section foreman (track maintenance). In 1920, his bride, M. Angelina Pizzuto (1897–1987), joined him. Relocating to Prince George in the early 1920s, he was a public figure successful in business. Northwest, at former Mile 192, a steam shovel operated in May 1913, and L. Johnson appears to have had a blasting contract months later. By January 1914, eastbound passenger services were running as far as Mile 190, with the expectation passenger and freight service would extend to Prince George on February 1. Months later, slips and the settling of previously unfrozen ground, leaving the track unballasted on the Prince George-Mile 190 section, delayed a westbound train for four days at McBride. The final 46 miles (74 km) taking five hours to cover, the journey terminated across the river from Fort George, because the bridge had washed out. Days later, a mixed train carrying 100 passengers fared worse. The passenger car abandoned at Mile 190, the men travelled in the freight cars and the woman and children in the caboose. Derailments on the 32-car train limited the next day's progress to 7 miles (11 km). Some walked to Willow River (about Mile 216.5) to board a steamboat, while others completed their journey by overloaded handcar. Until the Fort George-McBride track was rehabilitated, Edmonton stopped selling tickets to Prince George and stranded passengers from later trains returned to Alberta.

The station name acknowledged Hugh H. Hansard (1869–1931), Assistant Solicitor GTP (from 1911), Solicitor GTP (from 1912), who conducted legal negotiations with the various stakeholders along the route. In accordance with directives from the GTP executive management, who consistently steamrolled over unfavourable legal requirements, his role was to neutralise all opposition, which in some cases exhibited as few scruples as the GTP itself. However, this tactic also undermined the economic prosperity of communities and other businesses, hampering the increase in traffic volumes essential for the GTP's own survival. Following the CNR takeover, Hugh Hansard received a $7,200 payout.

The location included a pumpman, water tower, and wye. In 1920, an eastbound mixed train jumped the tracks at Hansard. Two years later, a locomotive derailed. In 1956, a bridge crew dismantled the GTP construction-era pump house.

When Albert J. Downing (1886–1955) became CNR section foreman in 1936, two of his daughters boarded for school in Prince George. The following year near Chilako, one of Albert's sons jumped from a freight car after the loaded poles shifted. When eight cars derailed, the two other train hoppers on the same car died. A moose charged Albert's speeder during the 1938/39 winter, derailing and damaging the machine. A local pedestrian experienced a similar encounter earlier in the same week. That winter, heavy snow brought down the CNR telegraph lines in the vicinity. At this time, Elsie and Richard Downing boarded for school at Sinclair Mills. Albert transferred to Isle Pierre in 1942.

In 1940, a work crew took several hours to restore the track bed washed out by overflowing creek waters near Hansard. William (Bill) Haws (1904–69), raised at Kidd, took over as section foreman in 1942. The CNR appointed John Prudun (1902–81) (Pruden alternate spelling) as section foreman in the late 1940s, and M. Kerchuk, Lawrence Goetz, and Hiram W. Clark (1899–1986), as successive agents in 1951. Mike Kosteck (1927–2001) became agent in 1954, but this was one of a series of shorter assignments culminating in his appointment as supervisory agent at Prince George.

A 1964 derailment of two boxcars near Hansard delayed the westbound passenger train for nearly six hours.

Built in 1914, the standard-design Plan 100‐152 (Bohi's Type E) station building was removed around 1967.

Service	1914–c.1915	c.1915–1919	1920–c.1921	c.1921–c.1924	c.1925–1931	1932–1934	1935–c.1938	c.1939–1942	1943–c.1958	c.1959–1967	1967–1968	1968–1977	1977–c.1989
Passenger	Reg. stop	Flag stop	Flag stop	Flag stop	Reg. stop				Reg. stop	Flag stop	Flag stop		Flag stop
Way freight	Flag prob.	Flag stop	Flag prob.	Reg. stop	Reg. prob.	Reg. stop	Flag stop	Reg. stop	Reg. stop	Reg. stop	Flag stop	Flag stop	

Siding	Mile No.	1922	1933	1943	1960	1965–72	1977–92
(Capacity Length)		Cars	Cars	Cars	Cars	Cars	Feet
Hansard	100.2	67	65	57*	52	53	2,500

- 3,000 feet

Other Tracks	Mile No.	1965–68
(Capacity Length)		Cars
Hansard	100.2	30

=== Forestry ===
The narrow strip of accessible spruce forest bordering the railway that stretched some 100 miles (160 km) east of Prince George was known as the East Line. The reference to Anthony Lumber Co. existing at Hansard in 1921 probably should have read Hansard Lake, because the company operated from May 1 that year in the Aleza Lake area.

In 1923, Martin Olson, purchased the Northern Lumber Co. sawmill at Willow River. After moving the dismantled equipment to Hansard, he rebuilt between the river and railway siding. Olson quickly resold to entrepreneur Albert (Al) Johnson (1866–1947), whose son and brother joined him in the enterprise. Olson unsuccessfully challenged the sales commission owing to M.C. Wiggins (1869–1948), a game-hunting associate of Al Johnson. When fire totally destroyed the 40,000-foot per shift capacity mill in 1926, a 20,000-foot capacity one replaced it the next year. The company invested in Caterpillar tractors to expedite log hauling. By 1929, the company suffered severe liquidity problems, but managed to survive into the Depression era. A 1931 fire again completely destroyed the mill and planing plant. Two years later, the logging equipment was sold.

J. Matiuk arrived in November 1946 to work with the Mack and Jack Sawmill Co. Two weeks later, Jack Stanyer of Newlands sold his interest in the company to P. Mickelow of Hansard. The following May, Matiuk sold his share in the Hansard Spruce Mill to J. Misiura and returned to Alberta. This mill operated at least from 1947.

During 1951, a plank road connected the mill with logging in the Bowron River area, and U.S. investors purchased the mill. At least one mill operated during the late 1950s. In 1960, a logger suffered broken ribs when pinned beneath a tree for more than four hours.

In 1964, Northwood acquired the Hansard Lumber Co. and the three Fichtner mills that August Fichtner (1902–73) founded. The former was located across the river, far from Hansard. However, one of the latter mills was at Hansard. These smaller mills closed soon afterward to consolidate sawmill operations at the company's Upper Fraser facility. The McGregor Logging Division initially operated from the Hansard site.

=== Hunting & Trapping ===
Geo. Moquist, Fred Oleson, and John Oman (1882–1945), were listed as trappers from 1927, and William Stroffield from 1929.

In 1942, relocating from Shelley, Arthur (Art) Renauld (1883–1957) (Renaud alternate spelling), a well-known trapper, purchased a 40-acre property. Although returning for visits, he had relocated by the mid-1940s. In 1945, a Hansard trapper died in Prince George from a self-inflicted rifle shot. When not attending traplines, from his Monkman Pass base, Henry Hobe (1886–1964) (Hobi alternate spelling) resided in Hansard. Big game hunters from Vancouver, Prince George, and the U.S., often met with their guides at Hansard.

In 1928, Anund (Ole) Hansen (1892–1974) of Aleza Lake (Olie Hanson alternate spelling), hunter, trapper and boatman, married Helen Dragan (1907–78), but she remained a schoolteacher in Prince George area schools such as Ferndale. They relocated to Hansard in the early 1930s. He had been a big game guide on the McGregor River since 1912. Hansen was navigating the first supply boat, when Harry Jackson of Aleza Lake, an occupant of the third boat, drowned on the McGregor in 1930. In 1938, he piloted the boat that was to collect the "Pathfinder" car southwest of Monkman Pass. Back and shoulder injuries, which sent him to hospital during the 1940s, later resurfaced. Sons Anund Jr. (1934–63), James (Jimmy) (1940–60), or both, accompanied him on visits to his trapline.

Anund Jr., one of the youngest hunting guides in Canada, started at 13, but my 1961, rumours circulated regarding his fitness to hold a BC Guides Licence. Ole and Anund Jr. were instrumental in locating the lost 1961 hikers. Ole retired in 1962. Jimmy took his own life, and Anund Jr. died in an apparent logging accident.

=== Community ===
The population went from minimal in 1918, to about 100 by 1929, but 50 by 1930.

E. Franklin Hendren opened a general store and was the inaugural postmaster 1924–25, a role commonly performed by a storeowner in such towns. Moving from Aleza Lake in 1925, John Francis (1871–1940) & Barbara (1876–1954) Wilson took over the general store and she became postmaster 1925–39. Her daughter left in 1934 to become teacher at the Chief Lake school. The following year, her son Francis (1912–?) married Flora Houghtaling (1915–?), and the couple settled in Hansard.

In 1938, the Pentecostal Assembly held a series of services in Wilson's Hall, located next to the post-office. On the Wilson's departure, John Misiura (1903–81) purchased their home, and wife Margaret became postmaster 1939–43. The general store reopened after closing for a year. With separation and divorce, John became postmaster 1946–56.

Situated a little over a mile northwest of the station, within the village, the school opened in January 1940 with Miss K.M. Richardson as the inaugural teacher. The building quickly became a venue for social occasions, many of which were fundraising events. Neighbouring communities often attended one another's concerts and dances, and scheduling minimized dates clashing.

Appointed for the 1942/43 school year, Mrs. Eleanor Stewart (1900–93) married Harold Toplis (1908–84), but completed the year before settling in Upper Fraser. Miss W. Davidson taught the following year. High school students boarded in Prince George.

Mary Josephine (Josie) Haws (1912–99), the section foreman's wife, assisted with the Junior Red Cross. The memorable Advent news item was: "Mrs. W. Haws, accompanied by her daughter, Mary, and son, Joseph, visited her mother-in-law Mrs. J. W. Cattle Saturday." Josie Haws also kept a cow, which when sold ended the only fresh milk supply for the area. Her brother, T. Fleetwood (Fleet) Weaver (1918–44), who spent most of his life at Hansard, was killed in action during World War II.

The schoolhouse painted, Mrs. W. Cannon was the teacher for the 1944/45 year, when a hot lunch program was implemented. Student enrolments ranged 14–16 in 1940–45, 8 in the 1946, and 9–12 in 1952–57. Insufficient student numbers closed the school 1947–52, and finally in 1958. The 36' x 20' frame building was moved to Upper Fraser.

In the mid-1940s, the population comprised 65 family units. Storekeeper John Misiura was fined for exceeding the controlled prices during World War II, with the store closing a couple of years later. Girl Guides and Scouts operated, but members apparently belonged to the Sinclair Mills groups.

Deep fresh snow greeted Miss E. Thompson, the teacher for the 1946/47 year. One day, a bear followed her along the railway tracks to the general store, where J. Misiura came to her rescue. Marie, one of Ole Hansen's daughters, had a perfect attendance record, because she was never late nor missed a day during her eight years at Hansard school. Her sister Ruth, a well-rounded student, was nominated May queen at her high school.

During 1951, Catholic services were held alternate Sundays in the school. John Chymelk, previously at the mill, farmed on the former Misiura property. Milk from his two cows and fresh eggs from his 100 chickens supplied the town. The Hansens filled a void by opening a general store/café, with wife Helen as the final postmaster 1956–57.

In the mid-1970s, a preliminary RDFFG study recommended that two conventional communities, comprising an expanded Willow River and a new town site at Hansard, replace company-owned mill towns. Grants, community consultations and various development proposals followed, but no such developments came to fruition.

=== Ferry & Loading Areas ===
In 1911, cable towers were constructed on opposite banks of the Fraser to provide a ferry service connecting communities across the river with Hansard. With the railway soon providing this link, the towers served little purpose. In 1925, Joseph (Joe) Gagne, a recluse, settled in the area and acquired the property on the northeast bank upon which a tower stood. To reach the road on that side, an ice bridge provided the winter route, but after the spring thaw, motorists faced the inconvenience of rail transport by flatcar, or a privately arranged water crossing. To the left of the road after making the 370-metre (1,200-foot) crossing, Joe's cabin included a floating floor to handle flooding. A farmer, he focused on potato crops.

The three options for a vehicular crossing were a highways ferry (limited to the short summer months), a new provincial bridge ($104,000), or planking the CNR Hansard Bridge track. The CNR objected to planking, proposing instead a separate vehicle roadway attachment, entailing a $60,000 capital cost and $4,650 annual rental charge. The greater value of a new separate road bridge, and World War II financial constraints, narrowed the immediate choice to a ferry.

Ole Hansen piloted the ferry on its 1942 maiden voyage. During the late 1940s, the ferry operators included A. Hanley, and Joe Gagne, with the vessel hauled from the water for the long winters.

When the ferry sank in shallow water at the 1951 spring launching, the fitting of two steel pontoons kept it out of commission until August. Lou Gale became the operator, followed by Ole Hansen, and Charles Carlson. A capacity of two cars or one truck per trip, for the 15- to 20-minute crossing, limited its functionality. Many years, the peak water levels resulted in suspending sailings for several days. Low water conditions brought the season to an earlier close.

A condemned cable tower delayed the opening of the 1957 ferry season. Joe Gagne, disposed to physical altercations, for four years had refused to let any highways repair crew access his property to replace the structure. After months of failed negotiations, the government expropriated this portion of land, before sending in a work crew accompanied by armed police.

With the reaction ferry in summer, dangerous river ice in winter, and no crossing in spring or fall, the 1960s brought a continuing demand for adapting the CNR bridge for vehicular traffic. The final summer the 6 a.m. to 11 p.m. daily ferry service operated was 1968.

=== Road Transport ===
To extend the existing Prince George-Aleza Lake highway, the 30 miles (48 km) to Longworth were cleared, grubbed and rough graded during 1929. Despite the ongoing Hansard-Longworth work, the rapid deterioration of the road, culverts and bridges, made it largely impassable beyond Hansard. By 1931, the Great Depression relief program provided labour from three camps between Aleza Lake and Hansard. When worker discontent escalated, the men at the Hansard and Mile 111 camps refused to work. These camps closed, but the Hudson Bay Spur (Upper Fraser) one appears to have remained open.

In 1932, the road condition from Prince George became adequate for cars, but the lack of a gravel supply between Giscome and Hansard delayed ballasting. By 1937, this road was gravelled to four miles (6.4 km) west of Upper Fraser, with the remaining seven miles (11 km) to Hansard graded. The Prince George-Hansard weekend bus service, whose intermediate stops included Upper Fraser, appears short lived. In 1939, the Hansard-Sinclair Mills road was sand surfaced from Hansard to the west end of the muskeg, two miles (3.2 km) west of Dewey.

During the late 1930s, Hansard delineated the southwestern connection for the Monkman Pass Highway proposal.

In 1941, Percy Garland (1900–60) pioneered a freight line between Prince George and Hansard, using a 1929 Model A Ford. During 1945, the final four of the nine miles to Sinclair Mills were gravelled, and regravelled in subsequent years. In 1949, a 7,000-cubic-yard gravel fill, with culvert, replaced the condemned wooden road bridge across a 35-foot deep gully at Mile 102 (toward Upper Fraser). Near impassable muddy conditions during that fall, and the following spring, prompted volunteers from the district to spend a weekend significantly rehabilitating the road west to Aleza Lake. Insofar as the road was navigable, regular Prince George-Hansard freight services operated, but the Giscome-Hansard section generally received insufficient maintenance. The government made a special appropriation of $100,000 in 1964 to alleviate this problem.

Planking around the tracks and the installation of traffic lights adapted the CNR Hansard Bridge to vehicular traffic in July 1969. Connecting with the new Highway 16, a 20-mile (32 km) logging road opened in the fall. Including the existing road through Giscome, three permanent access routes converged on the area.

Throughout the 1960s and 1970s, the three times weekly Prince George-McGregor bus route, which Prince George Transit operated, served Hansard. Giscome to Newlands was a typical country road regularly receiving gravel. However, the frequent potholes east of the Newlands slowed car speeds to 5 mph (8 km/h). The government allocated an additional $50,000 for gravelling the Giscome-Sinclair Mills section. With gravel trucks prohibited from the CNR bridge, an ice bridge across the Fraser provided a winter opportunity to stockpile gravel from a nearby source.

Paving promised for 1979 was delayed until 1980 and limited to a 10-kilometre (6.2 mi) section east from Giscome. Trucks hauling woodchips to Prince George were diverted to an alternative forestry road to minimize accidents upon, and damage to, the main road. In 1980, tight curves were eliminated and sharp shale gravel added around Newlands, but traffic volumes did not warrant paving. The Bowron logging road to Highway 16 was better maintained than the sections east of Newlands. During 1981, rebuilding and gravelling reached Upper Fraser, with paving promised the next year. In 1983 came fulfillment with paving stretching from Prince George to Upper Fraser.

Safety barriers lowered when trains approached the shared use CNR bridge. To ensure motorists and snowmobilers did not circumvent these roadblocks, a roster of four bridge monitors provided around the clock enforcement. The signalman on duty occupied the control tower. Flooding temporarily closed the road near Hansard a number of times. Public reaction to a 1999 proposal to close the Hansard Bridge to vehicles from midnight to 9 a.m. prompted a postponement and shelving of the idea. Upper Fraser-Hansard appears to have been paved to connect with the new road bridge opened in 2003.

=== Electricity & Communications Devices ===
The early telegraph office likely relied upon automatic printing apparatus, because there was no dispatcher at this station. By 1922, a telephone had replaced the telegraph. The respective Upper Fraser section covers subsequent developments.
