= Upper Fraser station =

Railway station in British Columbia, Canada

Upper Fraser

General information
- Location: Adjacent to the Highway; Upper Fraser, BC; V0J 2Z0, Canada
- Coordinates: 54°07′N 122°56′W
- System: inter-city rail
- Line: Jasper – Prince Rupert train
- Platforms: 1

Construction
- Structure type: Sign post
- Platform levels: 1

History
- Former names: Grand Trunk Pacific Railway

Services
Preceding station	Via Rail	Following station
Aleza Lake toward Prince Rupert	Jasper–Prince Rupert	McGregor toward Jasper
Location

Upper Fraser station is on the Canadian National Railway mainline in Upper Fraser, British Columbia. Via Rail's Jasper – Prince Rupert train calls at the station as a flag stop.

== History ==
Upper Fraser lies at Mile 104.0, Fraser Subdivision. Previously designated as Mile 194 and the Hudson Bay Spur, it was the closest railway point east of Willow River for accessing the Fraser. During 1914, Edward Andrew Seebach (1880–1932) (Seeback alternate spelling) and Albert James Huble (1872–1947) (Hubble alternate spelling), and farmer George McDowell, their agent, regularly advertised their weekly passenger and freight motorboat service to Giscome Portage, which connected with the waterways to the Peace Country via Finlay Forks. Five years later, the opening of the Prince George–Summit Lake wagon road superseded this route.

A steamboat service from Prince George operated into the 1920s. The spur also provided the best link to the outside world for mining and hunting activities to its north and northwest that encompassed the river and its tributaries. Unlike the unsafe and difficult Giscome Rapids downstream, calm waters prevailed upstream to the spur. However, winter freezing, limited river use to summer months.

In May 1913, during the Grand Trunk Pacific Railway construction, the Smith and Ramsay camp was just northwest at former Mile 195, and their engineer, F. Purvis, was just southeast at former Mile 193. Although variations of the name Hudson Bay Spur were in use until the 1930s, the 1920 description as the Hudson Bay’s old spur suggests the actual spur had fallen into disuse by that time. Largely known as Upper Fraser Spruce Mills from the early 1940s, the Canadian National Railway station was called Upper Fraser from 1964.

During the 1945/46 winter, when a brush with a freight train broke a moose's leg, a rifle shot put the hobbling animal out of its misery. Rather than plunging into the deep snow flanking the roadbed, moose often ran ahead of trains for miles, which delayed services and hindered section crews (track maintenance). Vicious moose not only challenged trains, but also charged children on their way to school, or adults walking along the tracks. During the 1948/49 winter, a snow plow travelling at 25 mph (40 km/h) scooped up William John Zuck lying on the tracks. The plow train's crew car carried the victim to Prince George, where a hospital examination found no injuries.

A westbound freight train instantly killed deaf George Whitford (1885–1965), who was sitting upon the track at Upper Fraser. The following year, a 160-foot (49 m) washout west of Aleza Lake terminated a westbound passenger train at Upper Fraser. The mill cookhouse fed the passengers, who remained on board. Towed through heavy mud and deep holes by bulldozers near Giscome, three buses brought eastbound passengers from Prince George, and returned with the westbound ones. In 1968, a railway accident cost H. Dyck two toes.

In 1978, Upper Fraser was one of the 11 communities between Prince Rupert and the Alberta border, where the CNR replaced its agent-operator position with a resident serving as a CN Express agent.

Service	1943–c.1947	c.1948–c.1953	c.1954–c.1958	c.1959–1961	1961–c.1962	c.1963–1965	1965–1977	1977–present
Passenger	Flag stop	Flag stop		Flag stop	Flag stop	Flag stop	Regular stop	Flag stop
Way freight	Flag stop probably	Flag stop	Flag stop	Flag stop probably	Flag stop	Flag stop	Regular stop	

Other Tracks	Mile No.*	1943–60	1965	1968	1972	1977	1990–92
(Capacity Length)		Cars	Cars	Cars	Cars	Feet	Feet
Upper Fraser Spruce Mills	104.0	11	35	103			
Upper Fraser	104.0						5,600
Northwood Timber	104.1				85		
Upper Fraser Sawmills	104.1					3,650	

- Assumedly, a remeasurement confirmed the spur switch was closer to Mile 104.0
