= McGregor station (British Columbia) =

Railway station in British Columbia, Canada

McGregor

General information
- Location: Adjacent to the highway McGregor, BC; Canada
- Coordinates: 54°04′38″N 121°50′39″W
- Platforms: 1

Construction
- Structure type: Sign post

History
- Former names: Grand Trunk Pacific Railway

Services
| Preceding station | Via Rail | Following station |
|---|---|---|
| Upper Fraser toward Prince Rupert | Jasper–Prince Rupert | Sinclair Mills toward Jasper |
Location

McGregor station is on the Canadian National Railway mainline in McGregor, British Columbia. Via Rail's Jasper – Prince Rupert train calls at the station as a flag stop.

== History ==
The Lund-Rogers Construction Company ran camps at the previously designated Miles 186 and 187, with the former as headquarters. The Grand Trunk Pacific Railway (later the CNR) Hansard Bridge spans at Mile 99.1, Fraser Subdivision (formerly about Mile 188.5, though a contemporary article inadvertently quoted the camp location). The low-level railway bridges at Dome Creek and this crossing curtailed the previous steamboat navigation, which triggered a response from the Barnard steamboat management.

Foley, Welch and Stewart, the prime contractor, operated on a cost plus basis. Russell R. Walker (1888–1973), a photographer of the era, observed tunnel work opposite Hansard on the north bank of the Fraser just west of the railway bridge. He suspected graft and corruption because it was nowhere near where the mainline would run. In a similar vein, William (Bill) Bellos (c.1887–1989), a construction worker at the time, mentions a tunnel cave-in at the faraway McGregor River, which is 11 miles (18 km) west beyond McGregor on the north bank.

The enforced liquor ban ensured sedate and sober camp conditions. In June 1913, flooding from the river forced the temporary evacuation of buildings at Camp 186. The Bates & Rogers Construction Company was contractor for the bridge substructure (piers and abutments) and the Canadian Bridge Co. for the superstructure (steelwork). By August, pile driving for the piers was in full swing and two steam shovels were excavating the bridge approach on the northeast bank. A temporary wooden trestle would carry the track until the steel bridge's completion. With track laying at two miles (3.2 km) a day, a completed trestle and the arrival of the railhead were optimistically predicted by October 1. Slicing through the piles, floating ice destroyed 12 lengths of the temporary trestle. With the railhead almost at this point in early December, this destruction delayed progress until the river froze over. While on leave with fellow workers from the Bates & Rogers camp at Christmastime, Harry Porter (c.1873–1913) met George Onooki (c.1890–1914), a former co-worker from Mile 160. The ensuing brutal assault of Porter was South Fort George's first murder. The motive robbery, Onooki was sentenced to hang.

Plans for a separate vehicle deck on the bridge never proceeded and the Eaglet Lake Lumber Co. purchased the surplus steel girders in 1916. High water levels during the 1936 spring floods left very little clearance for driftwood to pass beneath the bridge deck. A guard, who was presumably armed, defended the crossing during World War II. When the sun buckled rail lines to the east during 1944, six gravel cars derailed.

McGregor flag stop lies at the eastern end of the Hansard Bridge. The former community was just east at Mile 98.5.

| Service | c.1959–1965 | 1965–1977 | 1977–c.1981 | c.1982–c.1989 | c.1990–c.1993 | c.1994–present |
|---|---|---|---|---|---|---|
| Mile No. | 98.3 | 98.4 | 98.9 | | 98.5 | |
| Passenger | Flag stop | Flag stop | Flag stop | Flag stop | Flag stop | Flag stop |
| Way freight | Flag stop | Flag stop | | | | |

Whether the flag stop was not clearly defined, or actually moved, is unclear. Initially called Church Sawmills from the late 1950s, it became Sinclair Spruce Mills from 1965, then Northwood Timber Ltd. 2 from 1973, and then McGregor by 1976.

| Other Tracks | Mile No. | 1960 | 1965 | 1968 | 1972 | 1977 |
|---|---|---|---|---|---|---|
| (Capacity Length) | | Cars | Cars | Cars | Cars | Feet |
| Church Sawmills | 98.3 | 9 | | | | |
| Sinclair Spruce Mills | 98.4 | | 83 | 109 | | |
| Northwood Timber | 98.4 | | | | 109 | |
| Northwood Pulp & Timber | 98.4 | | | | | 5,040 |
