= McGregor, British Columbia =

- Railway Point
- Location of McGregor in British Columbia
- Coordinates: 54°05′00″N 121°50′00″W
- Country: Canada
- Province: British Columbia
- Land District: Cariboo
- Regional District: Fraser-Fort George
- Geographic Region: Robson Valley
- Elevation: 611 m (2,005 ft)
- Area codes: 250, 778, 236, & 672

McGregor existed on the northeast side of the Fraser River 2.2 kilometres (1.4 mi) north-northwest of the Bowron River confluence. Positioned between Sinclair Mills and Upper Fraser, in central British Columbia, the previous community has since dispersed. McGregor, as well as the McGregor River, McGregor Range, Herrick River, Captain Creek and James Creek were named after Captain James Herrick McGregor (1869–1915), a Canadian soldier killed in action during World War I. As a partner in surveyors Gore and McGregor, he had undertaken extensive exploration and survey work in the area.

== Transportation ==
A trackside signpost marks McGregor station, a flag stop for Via Rail's Jasper – Prince Rupert train.

== History ==
=== Railway and Hansard Bridge ===
The Lund-Rogers Construction Company ran camps at the previously designated Miles 186 and 187, with the former as headquarters. The Grand Trunk Pacific Railway (later the CNR) Hansard Bridge spans at Mile 99.1, Fraser Subdivision (formerly about Mile 188.5, though a contemporary article inadvertently quoted the camp location). The low-level railway bridges at Dome Creek and this crossing curtailed the previous steamboat navigation, which triggered a response from the Barnard steamboat management.

Foley, Welch and Stewart, the prime contractor, operated on a cost plus basis. Russell R. Walker (1888–1973), a photographer of the era, observed tunnel work opposite Hansard on the north bank of the Fraser just west of the railway bridge. He suspected graft and corruption because it was nowhere near where the mainline would run. In a similar vein, William (Bill) Bellos (c.1887–1989), a construction worker at the time, mentions a tunnel cave-in at the faraway McGregor River, which is 11 miles (18 km) west beyond McGregor on the north bank.

The enforced liquor ban ensured sedate and sober camp conditions. In June 1913, flooding from the river forced the temporary evacuation of buildings at Camp 186. The Bates & Rogers Construction Company was contractor for the bridge substructure (piers and abutments) and the Canadian Bridge Co. for the superstructure (steelwork). By August, pile driving for the piers was in full swing and two steam shovels were excavating the bridge approach on the northeast bank. A temporary wooden trestle would carry the track until the steel bridge's completion. With track laying at two miles (3.2 km) a day, a completed trestle and the arrival of the railhead were optimistically predicted by October 1. Slicing through the piles, floating ice destroyed 12 lengths of the temporary trestle. With the railhead almost at this point in early December, this destruction delayed progress until the river froze over. While on leave with fellow workers from the Bates & Rogers camp at Christmastime, Harry Porter (c.1873–1913) met George Onooki (c.1890–1914), a former co-worker from Mile 160. The ensuing brutal assault of Porter was South Fort George's first murder. The motive robbery, Onooki was sentenced to hang.

Plans for a separate vehicle deck on the bridge never proceeded and the Eaglet Lake Lumber Co. purchased the surplus steel girders in 1916. High water levels during the 1936 spring floods left very little clearance for driftwood to pass beneath the bridge deck. A guard, who was presumably armed, defended the crossing during World War II. When the sun buckled rail lines to the east during 1944, six gravel cars derailed.

McGregor flag stop lies at the eastern end of the Hansard Bridge. The former community was just east at Mile 98.5.

Service	c.1959–1965	1965–1977	1977–c.1981	c.1982–c.1989	c.1990–c.1993	c.1994–present
Mile No.	98.3	98.4	98.9		98.5	
Passenger	Flag stop	Flag stop	Flag stop	Flag stop	Flag stop	Flag stop
Way freight	Flag stop	Flag stop				

Whether the flag stop was not clearly defined, or actually moved, is unclear. Initially called Church Sawmills from the late 1950s, it became Sinclair Spruce Mills from 1965, then Northwood Timber Ltd. 2 from 1973, and then McGregor by 1976.

Other Tracks	Mile No.	1960	1965	1968	1972	1977
(Capacity Length)		Cars	Cars	Cars	Cars	Feet
Church Sawmills	98.3	9				
Sinclair Spruce Mills	98.4		83	109		
Northwood Timber	98.4				109	
Northwood Pulp & Timber	98.4					5,040

=== Forestry ===
The narrow strip of accessible spruce forest bordering the railway that stretched some 100 miles (160 km) east of Prince George was known as the East Line. Logging camps existed in the vicinity by the early 1950s. Percy Church of Willow River logged north of this locality. When the government introduced forest management licences in 1954, Church Sawmills was among the first five approved in principle within the Prince George district. In 1956, two employees, who were engaged in building an access road, experienced a fatal boating mishap when travelling to site. In 1958, the company dismantled and relocated their Willow River mill. The rebuilt and upgraded facility, about 15 miles (24 km) north of Hansard Bridge on the McGregor River, processed logs from the surrounding area. In 1960, the company received one of the nine tree farm licences that followed from the 1956 Royal Commission Report. The previous year, Eagle Lake Sawmills Ltd. and Sinclair Spruce Lumber Co. Ltd. began trial plantings of a few thousand seedlings on their small tree farm situated mere miles north of the Pass Lake road intersection.

The Church planing mill, which operated at Cornel Mills near Dewey, may have relocated to Mile 98 and the Hansard area. Percy (1903–74) & Dorothy (1909–80) Church resided at Mile 98 or Cornel. In 1964, Percy was convicted of a hit-and-run incident near Willow River. Northwood purchased the mill in January 1965, but production had ceased months earlier. During 1965–1970, Percy and Dorothy Church developed the Edgewood Terrace subdivision along the north Nechako.

By 1966, an aerial photo placed the McGregor Logging Division base immediately west of the Hansard Bridge and east of Hansard station. This appears to be the location of the original five staff houses, three trailer units joined to form 20-person bunkhouses, up to 25 trailers for families, log loading infrastructure (for rail transportation to Prince George), and possibly the equipment maintenance facility and parts inventory. During the late 1960s, the company built an office/bunkhouse/community club complex (called the McGregor Camp) on the east corner of the Pass Lake road intersection at Mile 98.5. Weakened lumber markets curtailed logging from the mid-1970s onward. Subsequently, harvesting insect-damaged timber was the priority.

A sewage lagoon for the camp treated effluent prior to release into the nearby Fraser. However, the majority of these lagoons on rural-residential lots in the Prince George region malfunctioned, because precipitation exceeded the rate of evaporation. To prevent sewage from surfacing in swampy areas, the company adopted exfiltration, with effluent sprayed from a stabilization lagoon into a sand basin. A further upgrade came in 1991.

By the mid-1980s, Northwood dispensed with their remaining company logging crews, because contractors were performing 90 percent of this function. After Northwood removed fuel storage tanks from Upper Fraser and McGregor, the contaminated soil was excavated and treated on the western section of the camp. The mechanics shop comprised about 25 employees, many of whom travelled to the logging sites to service equipment overnight. The logging division may have maintained some facilities immediately west of the railway bridge as late as the mid-1990s.

In 1998, while heavy-duty mechanic Jeffrey Taylor was pounding a steel pin with a sledgehammer, a metal fragment projectile lacerated two main arteries in his neck. Rushed from McGregor to Prince George for treatment, he survived, but brain damage severely affected speech and leg movement.

=== Community ===
Isolated dwellings previously existed, but after the Church mill opened, many families resided at Mile 98 from the late 1950s. In the mid-1960s, the community numbered 150 and the company successfully petitioned for a name change to McGregor and a transfer of the post office from Cornel Mills. Reopened at or near McGregor, it operated from April 1966 to October 1970.

Dewey post office, opened in 1915 at what became Cornel, was some distance from Dewey station. Confusion between "Dewey" and "Dewdney", that caused misdirected mail, prompted a postal name change to "Cornel Mills" in 1956. Dorothy Church was postmaster 1962–64. Cornel station (Mile 93.8) closed in 1965, and Dewey station (Mile 92.2) followed in the early 1970s.

In fall 1966, when School District 57 refused to bus the 25 schoolchildren the 7 miles (11 km) to Sinclair Mills, parents boycotted the school. Resolved within weeks, Northwood provided a driver and maintenance services, while the district supplied a bus. The community comprised 13 families around this time. The two Girl Guides would have been members of another company.

While Sinclair Mills elementary temporarily closed for a few years during the 1970s, and after the final closure before the 1983/84 school year, McGregor students attended Upper Fraser elementary. The school district cancelled the school bus from the 1986/87 year, but temporarily reinstated the service during the 1989/90 winter.

The McGregor site comprised a collection of three-storey bunkhouses, a logging maintenance shop and scattered trailers. However, the paved road west convinced more workers to commute from Prince George rather than reside locally. In 1987, the office trailers were for sale. Under review for years, the McGregor camp's remoteness from logging areas, and being an hour's drive from Prince George, persuaded Northwood to give residents notice that the facility would close in June 1999. Decreasing casual and residential usage made it too expensive to maintain. The decision primarily affected four logging families and the four CNR Hansard Bridge monitors. Demolition contractors cleared the vacated site.

An Esso card lock facility operated at McGregor.

=== Road transportation and aerodrome ===
The respective Hansard section covers roadbuilding and bus services. In 1973, a Cessna 185 crashed into trees during a landing at the airstrip. Pilot James Mueller (1941–92), son of Ray and grandson of farmer Gratian Mueller of Longworth, sustained serious injuries, but the two passengers escaped with minor scrapes. James Mueller was a Prince George logging contractor, who had worked in the area on leaving school.

=== Electricity & Communications Devices ===
The respective Upper Fraser section covers this subject.
