= McGregor River =

Location
- Country: Canada
- Province: British Columbia
- District: Cariboo Land District

Physical characteristics
- Source: Wishaw Lake
- Mouth: Fraser River
  - coordinates: 54°10′47″N 122°2′2″W
  - elevation: 588 m (1,929 ft)
- Discharge
  - location: gage 08KB003
  - average: 214 m^{3}/s (7,600 cu ft/s)
  - minimum: 17.1 m^{3}/s (600 cu ft/s)
  - maximum: 1,940 m^{3}/s (69,000 cu ft/s)

The McGregor River is a tributary of the Fraser River in the Canadian province of British Columbia.

The McGregor River was named for the Provincial Land Surveyor Captain James Herrick McGregor, who fought and died in 1915 at the Second Battle of Ypres, in Belgian Flanders. It was formerly known as the Big Salmon River. It commemorates Captain McGregor who was the first president of the BC Land Surveyors, president of Victoria's Union Club, and a poet.

== Course ==
The McGregor River originates in Wishaw Lake, a remote lake located in Kakwa Provincial Park and Protected Area and flows generally west and northwest to join the Fraser River northeast of Prince George.

== See also ==
- List of tributaries of the Fraser River
- List of rivers of British Columbia
- McGregor Plateau
- McGregor, British Columbia
