= Prince George Transit System =

Public transit provider in British Columbia

Prince George Transit
- Service area: Prince George, British Columbia
- Service type: Transit bus, paratransit
- Alliance: BC Transit
- Operator: Keolis
- Website: Prince George Transit System

Prince George Transit System, or PG Transit, is the main public transit provider in Prince George, British Columbia. PG Transit is funded in conjunction with the City of Prince George and BC Transit (The provincial Crown corporation responsible for transit services outside Greater Vancouver), and operated by Prince George Transit Ltd., a subsidiary of Keolis.

== Bus service ==
=== Routes ===
| No. | Name | Description | Notes |
|---|---|---|---|
| 1 | Heritage/10th | Downtown, Spruceland, Foothills, Ospika | Clockwise |
| 11 | Heritage/10th | Downtown, Spruceland, Ospika, Foothills | Counter-clockwise |
| 5 | Victoria/5th | Spruceland, Downtown, Victoria, Pine Centre | Clockwise |
| 55 | Victoria/5th | Downtown, Spruceland, Tabor, Pine Centre, Victoria | Counter-clockwise |
| 12 | Parkridge | Westgate, Domano, Park, Bon Voyage Duchess Park Sec. | Operates only when schools in session |
| 15 | UNBC/15th Ave. | Downtown, 15th, UNBC | |
| 16 | UNBC/College Heights | Domano, Simon Fraser, Tyner, UNBC | Weekend Service to Westgate Mall |
| 17 | UNBC via 5th | Spruceland, 5th, UNBC | September to April only |
| 18 | UNBC/Spruceland | UNBC, 5th, Spruceland | September to April only |
| 46 | Queensway | Downtown, Queenway, Ospika, Pine Centre, 15th, Victoria | Clockwise |
| 47 | Reverse Queensway | Downtown, Patricia, 15th, Pine Centre, Pine Centre, Ospika, Queensway | Counter-clockwise |
| 88 | Westgate | Hart Exchange, Highway 97, Spruceland, Pine Centre, Westwood, Domano, Westgate, Bon Voyage | |
| 89 | Hart | Westgate, Westwood, Pine Centre, Spruceland, Highway 97, Hart Exchange | |
| 91 | Spruceland to Hart | Spruceland, North Nechako, Foothills, Hart Exchange | |
| 96 | Kelly via N. Nechako | Spruceland, North Nechako, Kelly | Only When School Is In Session |
| 97 | Kelly via John Hart Hwy | Spruceland, Highway 97, Kelly | Only When School Is In Session |
| 105 | Express between Pine Centre and Downtown | Pine Centre Exchange, the College of New Caledonia, Spruceland Exchange, and Downtown | Weekdays only & Express service |

=== Frequency ===
Routes 1, 5, 11, 46, 47, 55 run hourly when University is in Every 30 mins at peak times; Routes 15 runs every 15min at peak times and every 30 mins on weekdays and hourly on weekends 16, 88, and 89 run every 30 mins on weekdays and every hour on weekends; Routes 17 and 18 are Peak Hour, Peak Direction Only when university in session sept to April; Routes 12, 96 and 97 are limited service only when school is in. route 91 runs hourly 7 days a week

=== Fares ===
Adult fares cost $2.50, and Children under 12 travel free. Day Passes are $5. There are also 30-day monthly passes for $60 ($50 for Seniors/Students) plus a 4-month semester pass for High School students for $135. U-Pass At UNBC and CNC are included in Student Fees.

== Paratransit ==
handyDART is a dial-a-ride service for people with a disability that is sufficiently severe that they are unable to use regular transit buses without assistance. Clients must be pre-registered to make use of this service. operated By Carefree Society

== Equipment used ==
- Dennis Dart SLF
- Nova Bus LFS
