= Bowron River =

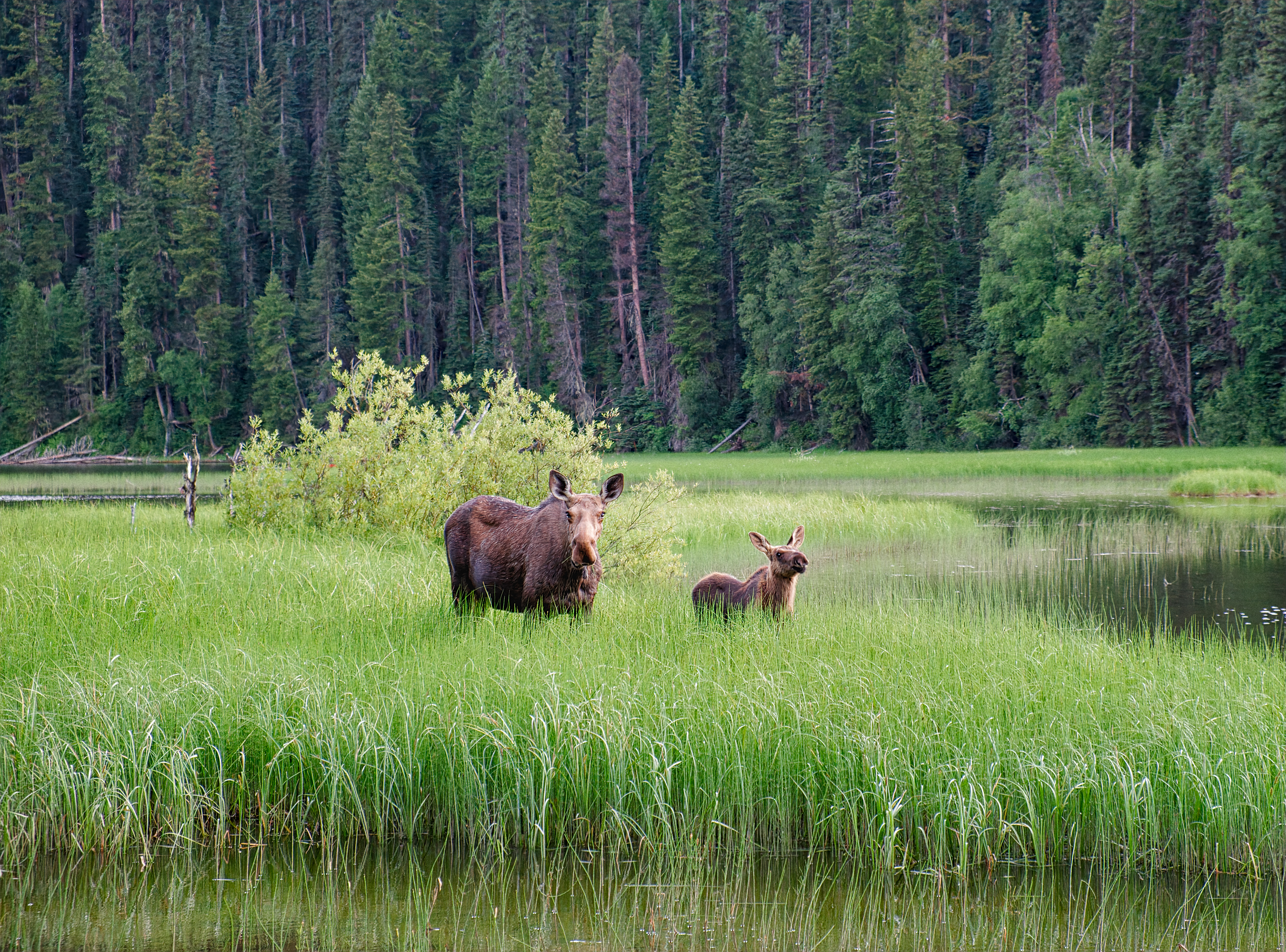

Location
- Country: Canada
- Province: British Columbia
- District: Cariboo Land District

Physical characteristics
- Mouth: Fraser River
  - coordinates: 54°3′30″N 121°49′35″W
  - elevation: 589 m (1,932 ft)
- Discharge
  - location: gage 08KD007
  - average: 64.7 m^{3}/s (2,280 cu ft/s)
  - minimum: 8.85 m^{3}/s (313 cu ft/s)
  - maximum: 580 m^{3}/s (20,000 cu ft/s)

The Bowron River, also formerly named the Bear River and Reid Creek, is a tributary of the Fraser River in the Canadian province of British Columbia. It originates in Bowron Lake Provincial Park of east central British Columbia and flows northwest from the outlet of the Bowron Lakes, then northeast, to join the Fraser River. The river was named after John Bowron, the Gold Commissioner in Barkerville.

== Notable features ==
Portage Canyon, accessed by a 0.5 km trail off the Vama Vama Forest Service Road, is a stretch of rough water in the lower third of the Bowron River. This spot provides a secluded picnic spot and prime trout-fishing.

== See also ==
- Bowron clearcut
- List of rivers of British Columbia
