= Giscome =

Giscome, British Columbia
- Locality
- Location of Giscome in British Columbia
- Coordinates: 54°04′00″N 122°22′00″W
- Country: Canada
- Province: British Columbia
- Regional District: Fraser-Fort George
- Time zone: UTC−07:00 (PT)

Giscome is a community comprising scattered houses located at the southwest end of Eaglet Lake, which is east of Willow River, in central British Columbia. A combined elementary school (to which children are bussed) and East Line Activity Centre (community centre with gym) serves the surrounding settlements from Willow River to Longworth. In 2020, Graymont Western Canada Inc. is planning to open a quarry and lime plant on the former mill and Canadian National Railway (CNR) quarry sites. The community and Giscome Portage were named after John Robert Giscom(b)e, a black prospector from Jamaica, who came to the district in the 1860s.

== History ==
James Edward Bateman was the first settler in the area, obtaining a crown grant in 1914 for a narrow lot one mile east of Giscome along the lakeshore, over which the Grand Trunk Pacific Railway (GTP) held a right-of way. Of the 10 additional early settlers, only Alexander James Hubbard later obtained a grant. Bateman's wife, Wilhelmina, "Minnie", was Hubbard's sister. Bateman's son-in–law was Charles Lindstrom, and grandson was Charles Edward Lindstrom. The Batemans, Hubbards and Lindstroms arrived together in 1911. Although suffering broken ribs from a horse's kick and bankruptcy during the 1920s, James Bateman went on to prosper as a dairy farmer. He died in 1938. A resident until 1957, Wilhelmina died at 96 in 1963. Experiencing a bull attack and some brushes with the law, Alex Hubbard operated a successful dairy farm. After his wife, Mary Jane, accidentally drowned in their cellar in 1946, he married Thelma Selina Burton the following year. Advertised for over three years, he finally sold the farm. He died at 99 in 1973.

Giscome, like Willow River to the west and Newlands to the east, was an original train station (1914) on the GTP (the CNR after nationalization). The railway line reached Giscome in December 1913. The standard-design Type E station building was demolished in the late 1970s. When Via Rail assumed the passenger operations of the CNR, they eliminated the Giscome flag stop.

The post office opened 1 October 1915 with Charles Lindstrom as acting postmaster. In operation were a school from 1917 (subsequently thrice relocated), and a general store from 1920. Throughout its history, the town boasted: a 14-room hotel, a 3-storey boarding house, a 2-storey guesthouse, a hospital, baseball diamond with grandstand, a hockey rink, tennis court, a community hall, a skating ring, a Legion Hall, gas station, and Catholic, United and Pentecostal Churches. For most of its existence, the population was in the 400-600 range.

A.C. Frost, an American entrepreneur, dismantled and moved his never used sawmill from Willow River in Dec 1916. Renamed as the Giscome Lumber Co. Ltd., it obtained its own railway spur in 1917. The trading name evolved to Eaglet Lake Lumber and then Eagle Lake Sawmills. Ownership appears to have passed to Northern Lumber at this time. The massive capital investment program at the mill caused liquidity problems. During the ensuing receivership, production was minimal for the 1917-21 period. The company supplied electricity to the township (1922–63), prior to BC Hydro connecting the residential area. Dave Jennings’ business (becoming Northwood Forest Products), a railway tie producer, had its own spur at this time. The United Grain Growers (UGG) sawmill had a separate log-loading facility two miles east of the train station.

In 1923, Giscome Spruce Mills Ltd., financed by the Winton syndicate, acquired the mill operations at auction. The company built a boarding house that could accommodate 300 men. Began in 1924, the mill's standard gauge logging railway would eventually stretch from Hospital Creek, near Willow River, through Giscome and along the north side of Eaglet Lake. During the 1924-25 winter season, the mill was innovative in using caterpillar tractors to haul logs, a practice still uncommon as late as the mid-1930s in the northern interior, where horses were primarily used before 1939. The road from Willow River was completed in 1926.

After six prosperous years, the Great Depression and a US lumber levy closed the mill in 1930. In 1932, Eagle Lake Sawmills Mills Ltd., a new syndicate, 75 percent owned by Don McPhee and Roy Spurr, bought the assets and drew on the stock of previously cut logs floating in the lake. The uneconomic logging railway dismantled, from 1935 a logging truck fleet used a 17-mile plank road from Newlands. The forest fires of 1938 burned 6,000 hectares and came to within a mile of the mill.

W.B. Milner purchased the company in 1943. In Jun 1948, a Central Airways Cessna T-50 "Crane" suffered irreparable damage after an emergency landing in a field east of the then school. The pilot and two passengers escaped unhurt. Giscome Farms Ltd., a company enterprise, acquired 80 acres in 1950, which evolved into a state of the art dairy farm in the district, operating until the 1980s. In 1951, union demands led to the first major strike at the mill. Strikes closed the mill for most of 1953, a short wildcat strike (1955) and prolonged union negotiations (1958–59). Fires in a kiln and the planer mill in 1957 caused a million dollars of damage to what was the largest mill on the East line. In 1962, a pulva-mix base greatly improved the road from Willow River, but it was not paved until the 1970s.

Northwood purchased the mill in 1966 and closed it in Nov 1974. As the company also owned the houses in the mill town, the residents were required to leave by the end of June 1975. Auctioned off in 1975, the town and mill buildings were hauled away, with the remainder demolished in 1976 and the site reclaimed.

After reducing opening hours, the general store/post office closed. The only facility remaining in operation was the school. Classes were held in portables from the 2009/10 year, because the 53-year-old structure was unsafe and beyond repair. The combined elementary school/activity centre opened for the 2014/15 year.
