= Penny, British Columbia =

- Locality
- Location of Penny in British Columbia
- Coordinates: 53°51′00″N 121°17′00″W
- Country: Canada
- Province: British Columbia
- Land District: Cariboo
- Regional District: Fraser-Fort George
- Geographic Region: Robson Valley
- Elevation: 632 m (2,073 ft)
- Time zone: UTC−07:00 (PT)
- Area codes: 250, 778, 236, & 672

Penny, between Longworth and Dome Creek on the northeast side of the Fraser River in central British Columbia, offers an access point for outdoor recreational activities. With a community hall and 15 permanent residents, No utilities infrastructure exists. Prior to the post office permanently closing on 31 December 2013, the community was the only one in Canada that still relied upon the railway for its postal service.

== Transportation ==
A trackside signpost marks Penny station, a flag stop for Via Rail's Jasper – Prince Rupert train. The immediate Via Rail stops are Longworth station. to the northwest and Bend to the southeast.

== History ==
=== Railway ===
Penny lies at mile 69.5, Fraser Subdivision. Previously designated as Mile 159 during the line's construction, it was the area headquarters for Foley, Welch and Stewart, the prime contractor. The Siems-Carey headquarters, and a work camp existed at Mile 160. Mr. Flannigan, a contractor at this camp, who considered all the camps maintained exceptional sanitary conditions, complained of IWW agitators seeking better wages and camp conditions. The government sanitary inspector, who described camp conditions as fair, destroyed 20,000 lbs. of beef at about Mile 160, and bacon unfit for human consumption at other camps. He advised contractors to stop dumping garbage into the Fraser River. Soon after, typhoid and diphtheria cases filled the medical outpost. In one 10-day period, the facility treated five victims of dump-car accidents, and the latest patient from Camp 162 had been cut in two. The Miles 160 and 162 camps were both large, and a hospital was mentioned at Mile 160. The true location of the hospital was likely Mile 73 (formerly around Mile 162.5).

Not a planned station on the Grand Trunk Pacific Railway (the Canadian National Railway after nationalization), Penny remained absent from the 1916 timetable. Exclusion from the 1919 and 1921 Official Guides probably reflects that only the employee timetables initially listed it as a footnote. Mention in the 1918 BC towns directory, and on a c.1919 map, suggest a 1917 or 1918 opening date for the station.

The settlement developed between Lindup to its northwest, and Guilford to its southeast. The name, a surname that emerged by the beginning of the 13th century, was selected for unknown reasons. Commonly claimed as an English place name on the list prepared by Josiah Wedgwood (submitted at the request of William P. Hinton, the railway's general manager), no such location existed in the United Kingdom. Furthermore, the name Penny, in use by 1914, predated the station by at least three years. Formerly it was known just as the Engineers' Camp.

Trains sometimes struck straying livestock, but slowed to a crawl if sighted in time. A passenger shelter likely existed prior to replacement in 1927 by a converted section tool house from Miworth. In 1947, the latter burned to the ground. Transported the 5.5 miles (8.9 km) by railway flatcar, Lindup exchanged its standard-design Plan 100-152 (Bohi's Type E) station building for Penny's Plan 110-101 converted sectionmen's bunkhouse. The CNR appointed the first station agent at this time.

A burned out journal box on a freight car immobilized a train at Penny for seven hours in 1955. During the 1960s, 18 cars derailed from an eastbound 98-car freight train in the vicinity, which delayed the westbound passenger train for three hours. In another incident, a head-on collision with a bull moose, just outside Penny, derailed 23 cars of a westbound 50-car freight train.

In 1970, CNR closed its section shop. Isolated communities, like Penny, suffered when the Prince George–McBride way freight ceased operations in 1977. The next year, Penny was one of the 11 communities between Prince Rupert and the Alberta border, where the CNR replaced its agent-operator position with a resident serving as CN Express agent.

The deep snow of the 1981/82 winter near Penny caused hundreds of collisions between moose and trains. By this time, the station was boarded up apart from a small waiting room. In 1988, an ice bridge was built across the Fraser River to carry the station by flatbed truck to its new home, the Prince George Railway & Forestry Museum. Using a raft 18 months earlier, volunteers transported a heritage railway speeder shed and tool shed from Penny to that site.

The remaining passenger shelter was removed in 1996.

Service	c.1917–c.1919	c.1920–c.1921	c.1921–c.1924	c.1924–1931	1932–1942	1943–1977	1977–c.1989	c.1990–present
Passenger	Flag stop probably	Flag stop	Flag stop	Regular stop		Regular stop	Regular stop	Flag stop
Way freight	Flag stop probably	Flag stop probably	Regular stop	Regular stop	Regular stop	Regular stop		

Siding	Mile No.	1922	1933	1943	1960	1965–72	1977–92
(Capacity Length)		Cars	Cars	Cars	Cars	Cars	Feet
Penny	69.2	54					
Penny	69.4		53				
Penny	69.5			46	52	54	2,530

Other Tracks	Mile No.	1920	1922	1933	1943	1960	1965	1968
(Capacity Length)		Cars	Cars	Cars	Cars	Cars	Cars	Cars
Unknown	68.4	Unknown						
Red Mountain Lumber	68.9	Unknown	Unknown					
Penny Lumber	69.2		Unknown					
Penny	69.5						20	20
Red Mountain Lumber	69.9			21				
Penny Sawmills	69.9				19			
Penny Spruce Sales	69.9					41		
Penny Forest Products	69.9						42	
Eagle Lake Sawmills	69.9							42

=== Map ===
The sketch map shows locations of various existing and demolished properties, together with former occupants.

Penny

Contents are a composite of source data. Clarence & Olga Boudreau's five properties are now owned by their children.. Larry has the former 108-acre Victor Mellows farm on the river. Immediately north, Dan has the former 153-acre Ole Mellos square property, of which 25 acres is north of the track. Jen has the former N. Pedersen 43-acre pentagonal farm, where her parents lived. Maxine has the farm owned by her grandparents. Jody (daughter of Diane Louise) has the former J. Dufour farm. The latter two are each 160 acres and square, with southern boundaries at the same latitude as Dan's one. In addition to the mill accommodation, forestry, CNR and private dwellings existed.

=== Hunting & trapping ===
Trapper Fred Rankin (1879–1964), a keen astronomer and resident 1939–1964, who arrived in the district in 1910, had a cabin near the creek bearing his name one-half mile (0.8 km) west of Red Mountain Creek).

By 1921, the recognized guides for big game hunters in the Penny area were B. T. Sykes, C. Hartsell and J. R. Norboe (c.1853–1921) (Narboe alternate spelling).

=== Forestry ===
A. Roy Spurr (1885–1954), who arrived at the Tête Jaune railhead in 1911, was a fur trader, who operated a store, café and accommodation, and provided a bookkeeping service, at camps during the railway construction. Using his savings, he opened a sawmill at Penny in 1917, later buying out his partners. The mill lay south of the village on the riverbank. As early as the 1920s, fellow lumber operators recognized his sawmilling and business expertise and sought his advice. Spurr's Red Mountain Lumber Co and the Penny Lumber Co. were both in operation by 1918, but a later misconception that the former opened years later possibly inspired the questionable claim that Spurr also had an ownership interest in the latter.

In bankruptcy by 1921, the assets of the Penny Lumber were acquired by company president, George H. Lipsett (1866–1955). Located south of the CNR track on Rankin Creek, it operated as Penny Lumber, and then as G.H. Lipsett Lumber, until fire totally destroyed the mill in 1926.

The narrow strip of accessible spruce forest bordering the railway that stretched some 100 miles (160 km) east of Prince George was known as the East Line. In the 1920s, with logging limited to the winter and fall seasons to facilitate the hauling of logs over snow and ice, loggers were transient. However, year round work existed in sawmill towns such as Giscome, Aleza Lake, Hutton, Penny, and Longworth. Injuries and death were common in sawmills and logging camps. Sawyer Laughlin McKenzie (1856–1923) was killed when a saw severed his body from head to hips at the Red Mountain Lumber Co.

The proceeds from selling Red Mountain Lumber Co. during the 1928 boom year provided Spurr with the funds to acquire other mills at bargain prices during the Great Depression. The purchasers, who were owners of Cranbrook Sawmills, dismantled their mill at Otway, and either sold or relocated the machinery to Penny. Like other sawmills during 1930–32, the Penny mill, then owned by the Joseph Campbell and John (Jack) Myers (1881–1960) partnership, scarcely operated. In 1932, fire completely destroyed the sawmill and yard lumber. At the time, Newlands, Snowshoe and Sinclair Mills were the only ones sawing, the latter having a big logging camp at Penny.

In 1933 Myers bought out his partner, and the following year rebuilt the Red Mountain Lumber Co. mill. In 1940, the 50,000-foot per shift capacity sawmill was again destroyed by fire, but the planing mill and processed lumber piles escaped conflagration. Fulfilling his prior commitment, Myers sold the mill to John F. McMillan and C. Earl Jaeck (1904–52), formerly at Bend, who changed the name to the Penny Sawmills. Jaeck died in a train/truck collision.

In 1942, a new dry kiln was installed, and several new homes and bunkhouses were constructed on the mill site to accommodate the demand from running two shifts. Since the homes mostly lacked indoor plumbing, outhouses were the norm and water came from a tap at the end of the road. The following year, fire destroyed the planing mill boiler room, putting it out of operation for 6 weeks. This may have been the occasion when a passing CNR locomotive rescued part of the building. In 1945, labour shortages closed one logging camp. The company name changed again to Standard Tie and Timber, when Standard Forest Products acquired the mill in late 1945 or early 1946.

In 1947, the large bunkhouse was constructed at Penny. The following year, the mill burned down, and a portable mill set up at the mouth of the Red Mountain Creek was used until the old mill was rebuilt. In 1952, renamed as the Penny Spruce Mills, the Totem Pole group, controlled by the Thurston family, purchased the operations, which included the bunkhouse and 35 family residences. Leboe Bros. of Crescent Spur provided mainly fir logs from the Goat River area, which were floated down the Fraser to the mill.

The mill, which employed about 120 during summer and 45 in winter, plus 40 at the logging camps, was one of the hardest hit by the strike of 1953. In 1955, the mill cookhouse burned to the ground. Closed in 1958, after the Bank of Montreal called the operating loan, the 100,000-foot capacity sawmill, steam and diesel power plants, 78-man bunkhouse, cookhouse, company houses, machine shop, garage, tractor house and various equipment were soon auctioned by court order.

During the 1940s–50s, as many as three sawmills operated in the area. The main mill, bought by Eagle Lake Lumber of Giscome, was renamed Penny Forest Products, and continued as a much smaller operation. In 1963, fire destroyed the mill and powerhouse, with only part of the trimmer left standing. Fire damage and outdated equipment made the investment in a rebuild unrealistic. Subsequently, Gordon Geddes ran portable mills until all sawmilling activity ceased in 1965. Northwood inherited the defunct Penny mill when it acquired the Eagle Lake mill in 1966. Long abandoned, the beehive burner, one of the largest in BC's history, still stands.

The back-to-the-land movement peaked in the 1970s, with two tree planting companies and fire suppression crews based in Penny. The movement largely comprised hippies, many U.S. draft dodgers, who temporarily settled along the East Line. In addition to occupying vacant houses, a commune existed by the river, which locals called "Buffalo Wallow".

=== Community ===
Population estimates were 25 (Rev. W.J. Patton) and 50–85 (Wrigley) for 1918, 200 by 1920, 100 by 1928, 100 by 1934, 203 for 1943 and 1944, and 200 for 1948. The population peaked in 1957/58 at 675, which included the logging camps.

Commonly, the postmaster in such towns was also a storeowner. Nels Pedersen (c.1885–?), the first postmaster 1916–19, ran a general store 1914–27 as a sole proprietorship or in partnership as Johnston & Pedersen. Thomas B. (1877–1952) & Betty Fae (c.1885–1945) Wall were storeowners, and she was postmaster 1919–25. William Birt and Joseph Melling purchased this store, with Birt as postmaster 1926–28.

Samuel (Sam) (1895–1940) & Annie (1890–1931) Michaylenko, who arrived as the CNR section foreman around 1919–20, operated a store 1929–31, and apparently applied to be postmaster.

The first school, held in an old bunkhouse behind the sawmill, opened in 1920 or 1921, with Miss H. Thomas (possibly 1903–?) filling in until the arrival of Mrs. L.O. Cameron as the inaugural teacher. Owing to low student numbers, it closed 1925–29. A one-room school was built as a replacement in 1930. To facilitate a second teacher, it was remodelled as two classrooms in 1943. The following year, a teacherage was built on the school grounds, with propane lighting added in 1955.

The last of the three facilities, a two-room school opened for the 1953/54 year, with propane lighting added in 1954. The former building was moved off the grounds. The school closed for six years during the 1970s, but students taking correspondence courses continued to use a classroom. It reopened in 1977 with 13 students. Enrolment for 1945–50 in Grades 1–9 was 27–32, 1953–60 in Grades 1–8 was 31–51, 1963–70 in Grades 1–7 was 6–34, 1970–78 in Grades K–7 was 7–13, and 1981–84 in Grades K–7 was 10–12. Having only seven students, the school closed permanently in 1985, with the building ultimately removed.

The community club, formed in 1932, held functions for nine years in the sawmill cookhouse. The community hall was built in 1941. The building, severely damaged by heavy snow in 1946, was repaired and an electrical generator installed two years later. The hall hosted country artists, professional entertainers, movie screenings and many weddings.

Badminton was popular. The hall was a venue for community dances during World War II, when many were in aid of the Red Cross. The post-war dances often attracted visitors from surrounding communities. The hall, falling into disuse during the 1960s, was renovated in 1971 and used for badminton during the 1970s–1980s.

When the mill closed, most of the population left. Some abandoned their privately owned houses, which had become worthless.

The Penny cemetery, 200–300 feet along the side road where the boat ramp road makes a right angle bend, is on land provided by Halvor Mellos. Volunteer male labour produced the coffins and dug the graves, and the women prepared the bodies.

A homecoming reunion for former residents occurred August 18–20, 1995, for which the book covering the community's history was compiled. At the time, the permanent population of 11 was meagre in relation to the 36 dwellings.

=== Pastor family, scouts, guides & polio outbreak ===
Joseph Pastor (1896–1982) settled in 1934. His wife Mary (1900–84), and children Mary E. (1920–86), Theresa (Terry) M. (1921–84), and Joseph (Joe) (1925–2006), joined him from Hungary. Although he worked in the sawmill during the earlier years, the farm was his primary involvement. Mary Sr. delivered milk, cream, butter and cheese to residents. On retiring in 1973, they left.

Joseph was also a hunting guide, who had been shot during World War I and the bullet was removed from his elbow in 1944. His Hungarian friend, Joseph Kobra (1902–65), a sometime Penny resident since the 1940s, followed him from Lindup, remaining in the Penny/Lindup area for 40 years.

In 1937, Mary married Gustof (Gus) Frenkel (1905–83), but they never resided as a couple in Penny. Their children were John, Margaret, Sheila and Marie.

In 1943, Terry married J. Earl Lousier (1924–2011). Initially a sawmill blade tooth setter, Earl became a sawyer after two years. Danny, their son, was born in Penny, with Theresa (Terry) Ann, Bonita (Bonnie), and Lorraine born after the family left in 1952.

During the mid-1940s, a Scout troop and Wolf Cub pack operated. Charles (Charlie) Adcock, the CNR section foreman, was scoutmaster, and Earl Lousier was his assistant. Thurston Berg led the Cubs. On Charlie's transfer, Larry Willington became scoutmaster and Alice Sinclair had taken charge of the cubs, but these activities soon folded.

In 1946, Joe Jr. married Marie Jopp (1924–2014). Joe, who played trumpet at the dances, months earlier had lost two toes in a logging accident. Marie was one of the two teachers for the 1944/45 to 1946/47 school years, after which she was available as a substitute. During the mid-to-late 1940s, she led the Girl Guides, who were involved in a range of events. In 1950, Marie was briefly confined to hospital in Prince George with suspected polio, before convalescing at home. Their children raised in Penny were Gary (1948– ), Richard (Ritchie) (1949–2004), Shirley (1961– ), Stewart (1953–93), and Terry-Lynn (1955– ), with Ronnie born after the family left in 1955.

In 1952, Mrs. R. Clark and Mrs. A. Ward are recorded as teachers for the Girl Guides and Brownies, the latter company having been recently organized, but these groups are not mentioned after 1953.

John Kuz (1913–50) was the only Penny resident to die of polio. He had arrived in Penny in 1937, where his wife Anne (probably 1917–2003) and baby Harold (probably 1937–2016) soon joined them. They were active in community life, and their subsequent children raised in Penny were Leona (1939– ), M. Elaine (1943– ), and John (1949– ). Initially a logger, John Sr. became a mill labourer, oiler, and finally millwright, where in 1943 he lost three toes in a mill accident. In 1949, a 12-foot fall required a hospital visit. On John's death in hospital at Prince George, public functions in Penny were cancelled and the school closed as a precaution, which was repeated during another polio outbreak two years later. The community collected almost $1,100 for the family, who left in 1951.

=== Crime, calamity & safety measures ===
During the 1927 forest fire, women and children were temporarily evacuated by special train to Dome Creek.

A sudden death in 1934 prompted an investigative visit by the coroner and a constable from Prince George.

Logger G. Edward Hooker (1915–36), formerly at Bend, slipped and drowned while breaking up a logjam. His body was found over seven months later downriver at Sinclair Mills.

In 1944 and 1945, the police arrested the offenders responsible for break and entries at the store.

A rolling log fatally crushed William Gorrick (1915–48).

Although limited mentions of houses burning to the ground, it was likely a common occurrence.

In 1957, safecrackers stole $4,000 in cash from the store.

While hunting near Penny, Kalman Malzsencizky mistook his friend, Bela Bill Cservenka (1927–65), for a moose and fatally shot him. First aid was administered immediately and after a boat trip back to the Pastor farm, where the victim died four hours after the incident. At his trial, Malzsencizky pleaded guilty to criminal negligence. Schervenka's widow was awarded $60,719 in damages under the provincial Families Compensation Act.

A self-inflicted rifle wound took a hunter's life on the access road.

In 1975, Imre Sorban fired shots at a boatload of people on the outskirts of Penny, forced another woman into a car, and later shot out two tires on the vehicle before he was subdued. Another victim sustained leg wounds from a shotgun blast. Midway through his trial, Sorban pleaded guilty to charges of carrying an offensive weapon and illegally confining another person.

When ice jams upstream and downstream blocked the river during the 1980/81 winter, owners could not reach their cars parked on the west bank, and flooding submerged 13 vehicles and carried off several boats. Though the townsite on higher ground was safe, houses in low-lying areas were flooded.

=== Relief programs during the Great Depression ===
The Aleza Lake to Tête Jaune highway-construction relief project began in 1931. The seven camps between Aleza Lake and McBride housed 500 workers. Discontent in the camps prompted demands for increased wages, and strike action occurred in April and July 1932, at which time the workers departed for Prince George. In August 1932, the province redirected the men to these isolated locations, now designated as non-work relief camps. Camp 88, Penny, was the largest of the group. On 19 November 1932, a physical confrontation with the camp foreman led to his replacement and a police investigation. On 25 November 1932, police arrested three agitators from the camp for travelling without railway tickets and they received one-month prison sentences. By month end, the camp held its full complement of 108 men. The camp closed in October 1933.

=== Roads ===
In 1947, Standard Tie and Timber graded a one-mile (1.6 km) road through the town. By 1951, there were 21 cars in the community, but still only one mile of road. When Highway 16, linking Prince George and McBride, opened in 1969, many residents parked their vehicles on the opposite bank of the Fraser River. In winter, the frozen river could usually be crossed by an ice bridge, but if the weather was unusually mild, the train provided the only access. A proposal for a reaction ferry or bridge access divided the community. In 1995, volunteers upgraded a 12-kilometre (7.5 mi) logging road, and for the next 20 years, maintained this only road access to the community. In 2017, the province agreed to maintain the private road to Longworth for two years. A replacement contract is under consideration.

=== Electricity, broadcast transmissions & communications devices ===
From 1929, the CNR telephone lines opened for public usage, linking Dome Creek with Prince George. Fifty years later, the CN lines from Giscome still served Penny's crank-style phones on a party line. In the 1990s, the service continued to be erratic, because Telus could not justify the cost of dedicated lines for so few customers.

Using a 150-foot wire strung between two 50-foot poles as an aerial, predominantly battery-powered radios received better reception from certain stations in Calgary or the U.S. west coast.

Some places had diesel or alternately powered generators. Otherwise, oil or gas lamps provided light and wood-burning stoves heat. Around 1950, the sawmill wired and supplied electricity to many company houses, which ceased when the mill closed. There are no BC Hydro transmission lines.

A new transmitter, installed by CKPG-TV on Mount Tabor in 1964, provided reception as far southeast as Longworth & Penny.

Completed in 2014, the Telus cell tower near Dome Creek also serves over 16 kilometres (9.9 mi) of Highway 16 between Penny and Dome Mountain.
