= Longworth (disambiguation) =

Longworth is a village formerly part of Berkshire, but now part of Oxfordshire, England.

Longworth may also refer to:

== Places ==
=== Canada ===
- Longworth, British Columbia
  - Longworth railway station, a railway station on the Canadian National Railway mainline

=== United Kingdom ===
- Longworth, Herefordshire, England
- Longworth, Lancashire, a former township in Lancashire, England
- Longworth House, an historic country house in Oxfordshire, England
- Longworth Road, Oxford, England

=== United States ===
- Longworth, Minnesota, unincorporated community
- Longworth, Texas, unincorporated community
- Longworth House Office Building, government building in Washington, D.C.

== People ==
- Longworth (surname)
- Longworth family
