= Guilford Lake =

Guilford Lake may refer to:

- Guilford Lake (New York), a lake in Chenango County
- Guilford Lake (Ohio), a lake in Columbiana County

== See also ==
- Gilford (disambiguation)
- Guildford (disambiguation), including uses of Guilford
