= Guilford (railway point), British Columbia =

Guilford, British Columbia
- Railway point
- Location of Guilford in British Columbia
- Coordinates: 53°49′00″N 121°12′00″W
- Country: Canada
- Province: British Columbia
- Land district: Cariboo
- Regional District: Fraser-Fort George
- Geographic region: Robson Valley
- Elevation: 650 m (2,130 ft)
- Area codes: 250, 778, 236, & 672

Guilford station was 6.3 kilometres (3.9 mi) southeast of Penny on the northeast side of the Fraser River in central British Columbia. No roads, only railway access, the previous small community to its northwest has now completely vanished.

== History ==
=== Railway ===
Guilford, like Lindup to its northwest, and Bend to its southeast, was an original train station (1914) on the Grand Trunk Pacific Railway (the Canadian National Railway after nationalization) (CNR). Guilford station existed at Mile 65.6, Fraser Subdivision (about Mile 155 during the line's construction). The chosen name, a surname of pre 7th century origins, derives either from the city of Guildford, or from residence at a ford where golden flowers grew. It was selected from the list prepared by Josiah Wedgwood (submitted at the request of William P. Hinton, the railway's general manager). Commonly claimed as an English place name, no such location with the different spelling appears to have existed in the United Kingdom. However an earldom was created, and the station name, like some US Guilford localities, may have come from a member of that nobility branch.

To benefit from both river and railway access, the mill and settlement were about 3.2 kilometres (2 mi) northwest of the station, but the latter's isolation gravitated passengers to the Penny station. In September 1913, the Sykes family, later at Penny, travelled by construction train to the planned Guilford station on track laid early that month. The family settled due south, across the river, and Ada Sykes' diary provides one of the earliest surviving references to Guilford's existence. In 1914, a landslide around Mile 66.5 (previously Mile 156), delayed passenger services by a day. Apart from a recluse, only the section (track maintenance) crew lived at the station locality.

In 1960, a speeder collided with a work train in the vicinity, killing Shirley Howard Scott (1905–60), one of the two CNR riders. Two years later, a bull moose, which charged an eastbound 59-car freight train near Guilford, derailed the caboose. The incident delayed the westbound passenger train by four hours.

Built in 1914, the standard-design Plan 100‐152 (Bohi's Type E) station building was replaced with a converted freight shed in 1950. Although Bohi notes the demolition of the former in 1950 and the latter in 1968, it appears more likely that the CNR burned down the former in the early 1960s.

BC Spruce/Fortin (Mile 61.4)
Service	c.1963–c.1971
Passenger	Flag stop
Way freight	Flag stop

Guilford stop (Mile 65.6)
Service	1914–c.1916	c.1917–c.1921	c.1921–1931	1932–c.1939	c.1940–c.1948	c.1949–1968	1968–c.1975
Passenger	Regular stop	Flag stop	Flag stop		Flag stop	Flag stop	
Way freight	Flag stop probably	Flag stop probably	Regular stop	Flag stop	Regular stop	Flag stop	Flag stop

Siding	Mile No.	1922	1933	1943	1960	1965–72	1977	1985–92
(Capacity Length)		Cars	Cars	Cars	Cars	Cars	Feet	Feet
Guilford	65.6	67	65	34	52	53	2,490	6,230

Other Tracks	Mile No.	1933	1943	1960	1965
(Capacity Length)		Cars	Cars	Cars	Cars
BC Spruce Sales	61.4			5	7
Vick Bros	67.5	4			
Guilford Lumber	67.5		3		

=== Pioneer Farming & Forestry ===
Ole (1882–1956) & Halvor (1891–1973) Mellos, brothers, arrived by scow in 1913, while the railway was still under construction. Emma (c.1897–1942) and Ole married in 1914. The pioneer farmers, who were joined by their sister, Ingeborg L. Mellos (1884–1952), all relocated to neighbouring Penny in 1927.

In 1920, fire totally destroyed the shingle and lath mill, which had operated at least since 1918. Gordon Bain (likely c.1884–?) had recently purchased the mill from A. H. Booth (likely c.1884–1947). Trading as the Red Cedar Mill, its infrequent advertisements for cedar products became weekly during the fire sale. The district forester subsequently seized the fire-damaged equipment to settle unpaid timber royalties.

The narrow strip of accessible spruce forest bordering the railway that stretched some 160 kilometres (100 mi) east of Prince George was known as the East Line. A 1927 forest fire spreading between Longworth and Guilford inflicted limited timber losses. Months later, in the vicinity of Guilford, a falling tree fractured the skull of logger John Johnson (c.1889–1927), who succumbed to his injuries while aboard a freight train en route to hospital. A year later, Asbjorn Fremstad (Framstad alternate spelling) (c.1908–1928) suffered similar fatal injuries when decking logs at the Melrose Camp near Guilford. The Vick Brothers Lumber Co., known to have operated a 20,000-foot per shift capacity mill 1926–29, was a victim of the Great Depression. During 1927–29, Archie McLarty had a 20-man crew producing 100 cedar poles per day in the vicinity. Fire destroyed 7,000 of these poles, worth $30,000, stacked near the station.

=== Guilford Lumber Co. ===
The acquired assets of Vick Brothers were relaunched as Guilford Lumber Co. in 1939. Herb O. Vick (c.1883–?) owned, and Douglas (Doug) L. Abernethy (1909–83) managed, the sawmill. The following year, they were charged with the theft of logs, owned by Red Mountain Lumber of Penny, that had been passing their log boom on the Fraser River. Remanded to a higher court, the defendants were found not guilty. In 1941, Abernethy and Frank Belanger, his logging camp foreman, bought new logging equipment in Vancouver. Months later, Belanger changed employers and moved his family to Bend, the same month as the Abernethy family moved into their new six-roomed house. The following spring, Abernethy was fined for a violation of the Wage Act, and mill worker John Babich lost two fingers when his mitt caught in the rollers. That year, two carloads of surplus machinery were shipped from Hutton.

In 1943, Charles Howarth (1885–1994) of Calgary, who managed the Hutton mill during the 1920s, purchased the Guilford one, with Doug Abernethy remaining as manager. The next year, logger Gustave Peterson (c.1886–1944) died in a work-related accident around Mile 61. The Guilford logging camp at Mile 61.4 comprised several windowless bunkhouses, a cookhouse, and horse barn. Another camp existed at Mile 62.5, where the then unmarried Frank Wagner worked 1943-44, and during a subsequent winter.

Clarence Riggs (1933–45) of Penny, employed as a flunky in the mill cookhouse, slipped while walking on the log boom. The Fraser River was unsuccessfully dragged, but the body was found by Joseph Kobra of Penny 12 days later in the millpond at Penny. The deceased was transported by rail to Prince George for the funeral. In recognition of Clarence belonging to the recently formed Penny Scout troop, the pallbearers were Prince George Boy Scouts in full uniform, as were other attendees.

Guilford Sawmills was subsequently fined for violating the control of employment of children provisions. Months later, in an unrelated incident, the company was fined for contravening the National Selective Service regulations.

In 1947, the mill resumed operations after a new boiler plant was installed. The replacement mill engineer was joined by his family, and a new bookkeeper commenced in the office. The Howarths, the owners, were residents from 1948 until the mill closed permanently the following year. Initially, the horses were sold, then the equipment from the 25,000-foot capacity mill was advertised. The boilers and planers remained unsold, but H. Liere acquired the sawmill, which he shipped to Babine Lake.

Charles Howarth died at 108 in Calgary. His wife Jessie lived to 101, making them the only husband-and-wife centenarians on the centenarians' list for West Kootenay-Boundary. He contacted typhoid in 1918, quit smoking in the late 1940s, and retained a sharp mind into his later years.

=== Community ===
A store and mail collection point opened prior to 1920, however the latter was short lived and recipients thereafter collected their mail from Penny. In 1945, the Guilford population comprised 47 family units, likely its peak. Owing to the limited social opportunities, residents attended the dances at Penny, and the wives, such as Irene Abernethy (1907–86), Mary Parranto, and Marie Wagner, participated in the women's functions at that location. Occasionally, the Penny women would visit Guilford.

Commuters often rode bicycles adapted for railway line travel, which were prone to jump the track on bends. Authorized employees regularly used the sawmill's motorized speeder for shopping, collecting the mail or social visits to Penny. Usually braking in time, on three known occasions, it collided with oncoming trains. Frances Wilson, Penny school teacher 1943–45, ruptured her appendix on leaping from the speeder during one close encounter.

Philip (1904–90) & Mary (1908–65) Parranto were residents. Their children were Gordon (1927–74), Theodore (Ted) (1928–92), Anna Mae (1933–83), Fern Marie, and Jim (fostered). Steam engineer Philip relocated for work to Prince George in 1945, but the family remained. The younger ones attended school in Penny. Gordon and Ted worked for the mill, but Ted came and went with work. Borrowed without permission, and hurriedly abandoned on the main line near Penny, the speeder was ejected from the rails on colliding with a train. Gordon, the offender, was sentenced to three months imprisonment or a $100 fine. The daughters relocated on marriage, but Fern's first one was short lived. The family had left the area before the mid-1950s.

Millwright Frank Wagner (1906–90), wife Marie (1912–2000), and her daughter Kaye, became the sole residents and caretakers. Except when a cougar was on the prowl, Kaye walked alone to school in Penny. After graduating high school in Prince George, she left in 1953. When the Wagners relocated in 1956, they created a ghost town.

=== Fortin Sawmill ===
In 1959, Frank Fortin (1927–2019) from Ferndale bought the Mile 61.4 camp from the government. He burned the dilapidated buildings, and constructed a sawmill, garage, cookhouse, bunkhouse, and finally the family houses. Beginning production in December 1959, the output soon increased to 30,000-35,000 feet daily. After burning down in a March 1960 fire, the mill was rebuilt.

The mill's generating plant supplied electricity for the whole community until 10:00 p.m. each evening. Having electricity and running cold water in the two-bedroomed family houses was an uncommon luxury compared with many East Line communities. The camp comprised four families with children and about a dozen men. An ice skating rink in winter, and a large above ground pool, bikes and swings in summer, provided entertainment for the children, while correspondence courses satisfied their schooling requirements.

With passenger trains arriving in the middle of the night, a lantern placed upon the track alerted the locomotive engineer to passengers huddled in the simple shelter at the flag stop. After the weekend, several employees returned to work from Prince George, or intermediate stops, aboard the early morning way freight, and groceries ordered from the city arrived by the same means. Families kept their ice cream in the cookhouse freezer.

The Fortin Sawmill received a merit award for safety in 1965. Purchased in 1968 by Alan MacDonald, the mill ran for only two months, before its resale to Wilf Leboe (1919–2010). Never reopening, the property was sold as a hunting lodge, and the mill equipment shipped to Crescent Spur.
