= Penny station =

Railway station in British Columbia, Canada

Penny

General information
- Location: Penny, BC; Canada
- Coordinates: 53°50′33.6″N 121°17′22.7″W
- Platforms: 1

Construction
- Structure type: Sign post

History
- Opened: 1914
- Rebuilt: 1947
- Former names: Grand Trunk Pacific Railway

Services
Preceding station	Via Rail	Following station
Longworth toward Prince Rupert	Jasper–Prince Rupert	Bend toward Jasper
Former services
Preceding station	Canadian National Railway	Following station
Lindup toward Prince Rupert	Prince Rupert – Jasper	Guilford toward Jasper
Location
- Location within British Columbia Location within Canada

Penny station is a railway station in Penny, British Columbia. It is on the Canadian National Railway mainline and serves as a flag stop for Via Rail's Jasper–Prince Rupert train.

The station was built by the Grand Trunk Pacific Railway in 1914. The original building burned down in a 1947 fire and the station building from Lindup, British Columbia was moved to this location. The station building was again moved in 1988 to the Prince George Railway Museum.

== History ==
Penny lies at mile 69.5, Fraser Subdivision. Previously designated as Mile 159 during the line's construction, it was the area headquarters for Foley, Welch and Stewart, the prime contractor. The Siems-Carey headquarters, and a work camp existed at Mile 160. Mr. Flannigan, a contractor at this camp, who considered all the camps maintained exceptional sanitary conditions, complained of IWW agitators seeking better wages and camp conditions. The government sanitary inspector, who described camp conditions as fair, destroyed 20,000 lbs. of beef at about Mile 160, and bacon unfit for human consumption at other camps. He advised contractors to stop dumping garbage into the Fraser River. Soon after, typhoid and diphtheria cases filled the medical outpost. In one 10-day period, the facility treated five victims of dump-car accidents, and the latest patient from Camp 162 had been cut in two. The Miles 160 and 162 camps were both large, and a hospital was mentioned at Mile 160. The true location of the hospital was likely Mile 73 (formerly around Mile 162.5).

Not a planned station on the Grand Trunk Pacific Railway (the Canadian National Railway after nationalization), Penny remained absent from the 1916 timetable. Exclusion from the 1919 and 1921 Official Guides probably reflects that only the employee timetables initially listed it as a footnote. Mention in the 1918 BC towns directory, and on a c.1919 map, suggest a 1917 or 1918 opening date for the station.

The settlement developed between Lindup to its northwest, and Guilford to its southeast. The name, a surname that emerged by the beginning of the 13th century, was selected for unknown reasons. Commonly claimed as an English place name on the list prepared by Josiah Wedgwood (submitted at the request of William P. Hinton, the railway's general manager), no such location existed in the United Kingdom. Furthermore, the name Penny, in use by 1914, predated the station by at least three years. Formerly it was known just as the Engineers' Camp.

Trains sometimes struck straying livestock, but slowed to a crawl if sighted in time. A passenger shelter likely existed prior to replacement in 1927 by a converted section tool house from Miworth. In 1947, the latter burned to the ground. Transported the 5.5 miles (8.9 km) by railway flatcar, Lindup exchanged its standard-design Plan 100-152 (Bohi's Type E) station building for Penny's Plan 110-101 converted sectionmen's bunkhouse. The CNR appointed the first station agent at this time.

A burned out journal box on a freight car immobilized a train at Penny for seven hours in 1955. During the 1960s, 18 cars derailed from an eastbound 98-car freight train in the vicinity, which delayed the westbound passenger train for three hours. In another incident, a head-on collision with a bull moose, just outside Penny, derailed 23 cars of a westbound 50-car freight train.

In 1970, CNR closed its section shop. Isolated communities, like Penny, suffered when the Prince George–McBride way freight ceased operations in 1977. The next year, Penny was one of the 11 communities between Prince Rupert and the Alberta border, where the CNR replaced its agent-operator position with a resident serving as CN Express agent.

The deep snow of the 1981/82 winter near Penny caused hundreds of collisions between moose and trains. By this time, the station was boarded up apart from a small waiting room. In 1988, an ice bridge was built across the Fraser River to carry the station by flatbed truck to its new home, the Prince George Railway & Forestry Museum. Using a raft 18 months earlier, volunteers transported a heritage railway speeder shed and tool shed from Penny to that site.

The remaining passenger shelter was removed in 1996.

Service	c.1917–c.1919	c.1920–c.1921	c.1921–c.1924	c.1924–1931	1932–1942	1943–1977	1977–c.1989	c.1990–present
Passenger	Flag stop probably	Flag stop	Flag stop	Regular stop		Regular stop	Regular stop	Flag stop
Way freight	Flag stop probably	Flag stop probably	Regular stop	Regular stop	Regular stop	Regular stop		

Siding	Mile No.	1922	1933	1943	1960	1965–72	1977–92
(Capacity Length)		Cars	Cars	Cars	Cars	Cars	Feet
Penny	69.2	54					
Penny	69.4		53				
Penny	69.5			46	52	54	2,530

Other Tracks	Mile No.	1920	1922	1933	1943	1960	1965	1968
(Capacity Length)		Cars	Cars	Cars	Cars	Cars	Cars	Cars
Unknown	68.4	Unknown						
Red Mountain Lumber	68.9	Unknown	Unknown					
Penny Lumber	69.2		Unknown					
Penny	69.5						20	20
Red Mountain Lumber	69.9			21				
Penny Sawmills	69.9				19			
Penny Spruce Sales	69.9					41		
Penny Forest Products	69.9						42	
Eagle Lake Sawmills	69.9							42

== Sources ==
- PRC (1995). A Penny for Your Thoughts... The Penny Reunion Committee.
