= Guldeford =

Guldeford may refer to:

- East Guldeford, East Sussex, England
- Andrew de Guldeford, 14th century Lord Warden of the Cinque Ports, England
- Guldeford baronets (1686–c. 1740), a title in the Baronetage of England

== See also ==
- Guildford (disambiguation)
