= East Guildford =

East Guildford may refer to:

- East Guildford, Western Australia
- East Guildford railway station

== See also ==
- Guildford (disambiguation)
