= Foreman, British Columbia =

- Railway Point
- Location of Foreman in British Columbia
- Coordinates: 53°57′10″N 122°40′35″W
- Country: Canada
- Province: British Columbia
- Land District: Cariboo
- Regional District: Fraser-Fort George
- Geographic Region: Robson Valley
- Elevation: 589 m (1,932 ft)
- Time zone: UTC−07:00 (PT)
- Area codes: 250, 778, 236, & 672

Foreman is a community just northeast of Prince George on the southeast side of the Fraser River in central British Columbia. The station was named after a Grand Trunk Pacific Railway (GTP) supervisor. Foreman Flats (a descriptive used as early as 1954) comprises about 20 residences inhabiting the northern and western parts of Foreman and is part of Prince George's Blackburn neighbourhood. Vehicular access to the eastern part of Foreman/Foreman Flats is via Shelley Road N.

== History ==
=== Railway ===
Foreman, like Prince George to its southwest, and Shelley to its northeast, was an original train station (1914) on the GTP (the Canadian National Railway after nationalization). Situated at Mile 140.7, Fraser Subdivision (about Mile 230 or 231 during the line's construction), it encompassed camps for Lund-Rogers and Magoffin & Berg. George Hardie, a Foley, Welch and Stewart superintendent, had a clearing contract that included Foreman at its eastern extremity.

In 1957, a slow-moving train brushed three men walking along the tracks near Foreman, resulting in hospital stays. One year later, a Canadian National Telegraphs employee suffered a crushed leg and hip injuries when a railway speeder struck him.

Built in 1914, the standard-design Plan 100‐152 (Bohi's Type E) station building primarily accommodated the section crew. Reconfigured in 1948 to Plan 100‐318, it functioned as a freight and passenger shelter, before relocation to Shelley in 1963.

Service	1914–c.1916	c.1917–c.1921	c.1921–1931	1932–c.1939	c.1940–c.1948	c.1949–c.1969	c.1970–c.1974
Passenger	Regular stop	Flag stop	Flag stop		Flag stop	Flag stop	
Way freight	Flag stop probably	Flag stop probably	Regular stop	Regular stop	Regular stop	Flag stop	Flag stop

Siding	Mile No.	1922	1933	1943	1960	1965–72	1977–92
(Capacity Length)		Cars	Cars	Cars	Cars	Cars	Feet
Foreman	140.7	67	65	57	55	56	2,610

Other Tracks	Mile No.	1960
(Capacity Length)		Cars
McDermid & Lofting	139.6	3

=== Forestry ===
The narrow strip of accessible spruce forest bordering the railway that stretched some 100 miles (160 km) east of Prince George was known as the East Line. The Lumber Workers Industrial Union targeted the railway tie camps during 1919–20. The J.W. Blain camp at Foreman, a major producer in the area, was one of the first to be unionized. The company agreed to most of the union demands, but by season end, it had failed to address the abysmal living conditions. J.W. Blain, which held the timber rights for the government reserve (northeast of the station), expected to take out 150,000 ties.

In 1922, headed by Martin Caine (1879–1978) of the Caine and Brawn partnership, the Foreman Lumber Co. built a 15,000-foot per shift capacity sawmill. One of the worst fires in the district occurred south of Shelley, where the company was logging. The creek water at Foreman being too low for fire prevention, the mill temporarily shut down. In 1924, milling commenced with two million feet of logs on hand. Children lighting a piece of fuse caused a forest fire at Foreman, one of the many raging in the district that summer. Having exhausted the available harvest in the vicinity and dismantled the mill, the company purchased Larsen Timber Co.'s six timber limits, near Miworth, in 1928. The next year, two miles (3.2 km) from the Foreman mill, high winds caught a settler's fire, which spread into an area burned four years earlier. That year, Caine began building a new mill on the Nechako River, at the western end of the Prince George rail yard, but postponed construction when the work was half complete.

The company's CNR tie production contracts, which were largely performed by subcontractors, were: 100,000 (plus overrun) for 1923; unspecified for 1924; 35,000 for 1926; 40,000 for 1930 (CNR having reduced tie acquisition volumes by 50% from the previous year); and 10,000 for 1939. The mill sawed the longer ties for switches, but the standard-length ones were hand hewn. Stacked high, they could occupy the full length of the siding. Caine admitted that in those early decades, the tight margins meant very few mills avoided bankruptcy. In his own case, the winter tie business subsidized the summer sawmilling.

Caine's lumber activities were dormant during the Great Depression, but thereafter, he operated a planing mill at the Nechako River site as Caine Lumber Co. Martin Caine came to the area in 1919. At different times, he served Prince George as chair of the school board (1933), a mayoral candidate (1939), president of the Board of Trade (1943–44), president of the Northern Interior Lumbermen's Association (1944–45), president of the Rotary Club (1950–51), and citizen of the year (1972).

=== Farming ===
John Porter (1860–1934) built the original cabin in the vicinity in 1909, one of the six earliest settlers to take up preemptions in the entire Fort George area. His mixed farming included potatoes.

In 1912, Antonio (Tony) Denicola (1887–1947), who worked on the GTP construction, bought a small holding about 0.75 miles (1.21 km) from the station location. His older son Joseph (Joe) (1909–78), later at Lindup, soon followed from Italy, and both were CNR section workers (track maintenance). In 1922, Baron Byng, the governor general, decorated Tony with a military medal for his World War I service, where he was wounded at the Battle of Vimy Ridge. In 1932, while climbing a tree to escape a pursuing bear, his legs were clawed. A passerby alerted the section foreman, who dispatched the bear with rifle fire. Years later, he experienced two further close encounters with bears.

In 1925, wife Maria (c.1884–1953), with daughter Lucy (c.1914–?), and son Armand (1922–2019), joined them from Italy. Andy Andersen (probably 1877– 1966) felled the trees and built their big barn 1934–37, while Armand hauled the logs from the bush. A land sale to Otto Bartkowski (1914–99) included the barn. For his World War II service, Armand was awarded France's National Order of the Legion of Honour. After his father died, Armand returned to manage the family farm, where he had been raised. He also was a partner in a small sawmill on Foreman Road. A chimney fire totally consumed the family house in 1950, which he later rebuilt. He married Doreen in 1964. On retirement, their son Neal took over the farm.

Albert H. Junker (1902–87), one or two brothers, and Barbara & Andy Crooks (mother/stepfather) settled in the early to mid 1920s. Acquiring a quarter section, they ran 25–30 head of cattle, and hacked ties for Martin Caine. Albert married Lucy Denicola, but they divorced. He later married Ida Mae Wilkinson (1916–59). His children were Carol and June. Albert, who conducted a mixed farm, had a White Leghorn hen that laid an egg eight inches in circumference and weighed eight ounces.

Jim & Roma Tingle purchased the farm in 1970. A casual employee at the federal experimental farm while at university, Jim joined the agricultural research station on graduation. He moved to the BC Ministry of Agriculture as a field crop specialist, and became a senior agrologist. Meanwhile the agrologist couple operated their own farm and contributed to the agriculture community.

William (Scotty) (1885–1970) & Annie (1887–1964) Howieson and daughter Margaret (c.1920–?) lived in South Fort George. William was a journeyman-carpenter involved in building construction, and wood and coal deliveries. During the summer months from 1918, he would stay on his farm at the north end of Foreman Road. He harvested and sold the hay. John (1904–84) & Mary (1926–96) Armella were the next owners. During the late 1940s, John developed five-acre lots in the area. Daughter Diane (1945–64) from his first marriage, the thirteenth victim in the Prince George polio outbreak of 1960, died a few years later of multiple sclerosis (MS). In 1974, the Armellas built the subdivision of what became Denicola Crescent. Bernie & Fern Gould are the current occupants of the Foreman Ranch.

Edmond Poty (1916–87), whose 1942 marriage to Ellen Rouse (c.1923–?) did not last, later married Anne Brodowski (1916–87). In 1950, an affray between two local residents led to broken ribs. Charged with assault, Edmond (misstated as Edward Potty) would go on to operate a sawmill at Mud River. His brother, Sebastien (1913–86), after whom Poty Road is named, farmed in the Foreman area until his death. During 1957, Foreman Flats underwent extensive land clearing for agriculture.

=== Community ===
By late 1962, Foreman Flats had yet to be connected to the telephone and electricity networks. Electricity came the following year, and telephone service a decade later.

Prior to the 1960s, children attended school in either Prince George or Shelley. The site for a new school cleared and leveled, class commenced for the 1962/63 year. Located in a field where Foreman Road almost forms a tangent with the bend in the Fraser, the Atco-style one-roomed singlewide structure had gas lighting and indoor plumbing. The log house teacherage had an outhouse. The following year, a doublewide structure with electricity and indoor plumbing replaced the classroom, and a similar one for the teacherage. Miss Schellenberg was the inaugural teacher. Over the school's seven-year existence, enrolments ranged 16–21. In springtime, the small backwater creek often flooded the area. Unable to use their cars, parents boated their children to the water-encircled building. The Atco portable classroom purchased for Foreman in 1964 appears to have been allocated elsewhere. With only 16 students across six grades, the one-roomed school closed in 1969. School District 57 disposed of the surplus school site in 1985.

The RDFFG implemented house numbering in 1989.

=== Municipal Water & Water Waste ===
In 1975, Wilhelm (Bill) Kupper (1913–2008), a Foreman Road farmer, threatened to cut off the area's water supply and to block the laying of municipal sewer pipes across his land to force the settlement of a six-year dispute with the Blackburn Improvement District. The legal suit concerned a well drilled on his property that serviced the airport, the federal experimental farm, two schools and 200 homes. When he carried out his threat, a BC Supreme Court judge immediately intervened by granting an injunction. Bill and wife Lydia (c.1925–2018) retired to Prince George.

The Lansdowne Road Wastewater Treatment Centre opened in 1973, initially as a secondary treatment plant for sewage. When significant solid waste accumulated, the sludge was trucked to the accompanying lagoons/landfill site about two kilometres (1.2 mi) due east of the Foreman train station, but accessible only via Refuse Road off Shelley Road N. The sewage ponds also became a disposal location for septic tank sludge. By 1983, two of the three lagoons were reaching capacity after eight years of operation. In 1986, trucking ceased when the city adopted an alternate process that created topsoil. During the early 1990s, an outdoor paintball game area operated on Refuse Road. In 1999, the waste facility received a $191,000 upgrade, and the RDFFG established a waste transfer station at the site. In 2000, the RDFFG rejected an application to establish a contaminated-soil treatment facility near the lagoons.

On at least one occasion, leaking tanker trucks, accessing the Blackburn treatment plant, blanketed Foreman Road with raw sewage. When completed, the new sewer system provided an opportunity for property owners to subdivide their holdings along its route. Although this included lots adjacent to Foreman Road, council did not grant the rezoning preferred by developers. Though later rezoned from the former five-acre lots to one-acre ones, the persistent Louis Raeber needed half acre or three-quarter acre lots for a viable development. Comprising lagoons on Foreman Road, the Blackburn sewage plant received further upgrades in the early 2000s.

=== Crime, Calamity & Safety Measures ===
In 1959, the charred remains of two people were found in the ashes of a log cabin one mile (1.6 km) from the station. A similar cabin fire took the life of Karl Kaldal (1902–62).

When a small plane lost power on approaching Prince George in 1976, it finished 30 feet up trees on Foreman Road. Neither the pilot nor passenger were injured.

Since the Skins Lake Spillway opened in 1957, flooding in the Foreman Flats area has been less severe. It did occur when the Fraser peaked at 10.44 metres (34.3 ft) in 1972 and 9.91 metres (32.5 ft) in 1990. On the latter occasion, the Yellowhead Road and Bridge 24-hour ferrying service provided the only access to the cut off area experiencing flooded basements. Subsequently, as a precaution in vulnerable years, residents installed sandbags prior to the river peaking and remained under evacuation alert.

In 1986, a fire at the Shelley Road lagoon blackened the sky. In 1990, a feud between two Shelley families culminated at the site. Uttering threats, physical assault, and a shotgun wound, led to charges against several participants.

In 1996, Peter Spiess rescued a neighbour who became trapped under the mobile home he was levelling, but questioned why the area zoning included mobile homes. Weeks earlier, arsonists destroyed the Bartkowski barn, but the responding firefighting crew took no action because it was beyond the city boundary. A year later, a resident's out-of-control garbage fire destroyed three sheds.

=== Roads ===
A road from Prince George served only the southern part initially. A wagon road ran 0.8 kilometres (0.5 mi) due west of the station and a trail 1.8 kilometres (1.1 mi) due east. In a Depression-era relief project, W. Howieson led an eight-man crew in extending Foreman Road northward. The road was not well maintained and in the 1960s the school bus driver could not safely negotiate the railway crossing and its adjacent hill. The near impassable condition of Foreman Road during the winter and springtime continued to frustrate residents. In 2015, the city initiated a one million dollar upgrade of the road.
