= Gilford =

Gilford may refer to:

== Places ==
- Gilford, County Down, Northern Ireland
- Gilford, Ontario, Canada
- Gilford, New Hampshire, U.S.
- Gilford Island, British Columbia, Canada
- Gilford Township, Michigan, U.S.

== Other uses ==
- Gilford (surname)
- Gilford Motors, British bus assembler in the 1933 law case Gilford Motor Co Ltd v Horne

== See also ==
- Guildford (disambiguation)
- Gildford, Montana
