= Lindup, British Columbia =

- Locality
- Location of Lindup in British Columbia
- Coordinates: 53°53′00″N 121°22′00″W
- Country: Canada
- Province: British Columbia
- Land District: Cariboo
- Regional District: Fraser-Fort George
- Geographic Region: Robson Valley
- Elevation: 668 m (2,192 ft)
- Area codes: 250, 778, 236, & 672

Lindup, between Longworth and Penny, existed on the northeast side of the Fraser River in central British Columbia. The previous small community has now completely vanished.

== History ==
=== Railway ===
Lindup, like Longworth to its northwest, and Guilford to its southeast, was an original train station (1914) on the Grand Trunk Pacific Railway (the Canadian National Railway after nationalization). The name, an early medieval English surname, was possibly selected from the list prepared by Josiah Wedgwood (submitted at the request of William P. Hinton, the railway's general manager).

Lindup lay at Mile 75.0, Fraser Subdivision (about Mile 164.5 during the line's construction). In 1912, Magoffin (McGoffin alternate spelling) & Berg subcontracted at Mile 162. The next year, their steam shovel at Mile 163 was one of the largest on the line. A camp existed at Mile 166. The station included a pumpman and water tower, located just east at Lindup Creek (formerly called Tank Creek). The early telegraph office likely relied upon automatic printing apparatus, because there was no dispatcher at this location. By 1922, a telephone had replaced the telegraph. A 1926 forest fire brought down nearby telegraph wires. The following year, a fire burning on both sides of the tracks from Hutton to Guilford threatened the station building and the railway dispatched a crew to protect the company property. While attempting to board a railway cable car at Lindup, Wesley Goheen (1910–78), a work train employee, slipped and a wheel crushed his ankle. The injured foot required a hospital amputation.

This track maintenance location closed in the mid-1930s, with the section crew reassigned elsewhere. Joseph (Joe) Denicola (1909–78) was foreman from about 1930 until closure. He was later a roadmaster (supervised section foremen within a territory), before joining BC Rail. His brother Armand Denicola (1922–2019), raised at Foreman, worked for him during this time. Joseph (Joe) Bugyinka (1888–1971), was a section hand from around 1927–28 until closure. He lost his first wife, Margaret (1891–1934), who inadvertently consumed poisonous mushrooms she had picked locally.

George (1891–1962) & Helen (1901–60) Wlasitz arrived around 1927–28. George worked as a section hand from that time until retirement. When the section closed, he was reassigned to Longworth. However, they remained Lindup residents until about 1956. Their children were Stephen (Steve) (1919–2008), Mary (1921–2001), Frank (c.1923–2012), and James (Jim) (c.1932–?). Mary married Nick Mokrey (1910–97), they lived elsewhere, but the marriage failed. Steve worked as a logger and as a section hand from 16. The older brothers enlisted. After the war, Steve commuted to Dewey by speeder where he was a section hand, but also worked elsewhere as a relief section foreman. When Steve married Helen Petro, the couple initially lived at Lindup, but soon relocated to Sinclair Mills. Frank married Winnifred Tate and they settled in Longworth, as did Jim on marrying Anna Margaret Mann.

Built in 1914, the standard-design Plan 100-152 (Bohi's Type E) station building was transported in 1947 by railway flatcar to Penny, and exchanged for the latter's Plan 110-101 converted sectionmen's bunkhouse. In 1960, this smaller structure was relocated to Eddy.

In 1952, when a westbound passenger train smashed into two boxcars at the siding, the impact shattered the empty one and extensively damaged the partly loaded one. Safety supervisor Edward F. Daly (1892–1958) suffered a badly wrenched shoulder. The boxcars apparently rolled onto the mainline following shunting operations the previous night.

Grade stabilization at Mile 75.87 in 1994 included culverts, manholes and revetment work.

Service	1914–c.1915	c.1916–c.1921	c.1921–1931	1932–1942	1943–c.1947	c.1948–1961	1961–c.1962	1972–c.1974
Passenger	Regular stop	Flag stop	Flag stop		Flag stop	Flag stop		
Way freight	Flag stop probably	Flag stop probably	Regular stop	Flag stop	Regular stop	Flag stop	Flag stop	Flag stop

Siding	Mile No.	1922	1933	1943	1960–65	1968–72	1977
(Capacity Length)		Cars	Cars	Cars	Cars	Cars	Feet
Lindup	75.0	65	63	55	51	50	2,350

=== Forestry & hunting ===
In the 1920s, a hunter for caribou in the vicinity observed the plentiful moose population.

The narrow strip of accessible spruce forest bordering the railway that stretched some 100 miles (160 km) east of Prince George was known as the East Line. In 1929, J.B. Turnbull (possibly 1878–1964) conducted summer logging one mile (1.6 km) south. Across the river to the north, Jack Smedley ran a logging camp. This is likely the same Jacob (Jake) Smedley (c.1882–?) based in the Dewey area (encompassing Sinclair Mills) during the 1920s, who was later foreman at the Sinclair logging camp near Longworth.

In 1928, Edward (Ed) V. (1888–1951) & Elsie (1904–95) Chambers arrived from Foreman. Their children were D. Bernice (c.1923–?), Jim (1924–?), Marie (c.1926–?), Lillian Jean (c.1928–2002), Charles Lindburgh (Lindy) (1929–79), Jean (1930–2012), and Bette. While hunting, Ed seriously injured his hand, when a falling loaded rifle accidentally discharged. Ed ran a 25-man logging camp that produced telegraph poles. Non-payment for a two-railway-car consignment to Nogle Co. during the Great Depression bankrupted his business. Unable to settle his business debts, the remaining cedar poles stacked at the siding were seized and sold by sheriff's sale. In 1934, the family relocated to the Mile 72 Relief Camp.

During 1949–52, Torsten Berg (1912–2007), a Longworth resident, operated the only mill to exist at Lindup. Milling the high quality spruce from north and east of the railway line, he subcontracted to Charles Howarth of Guilford Lumber to supply planks for the podium used at Queen Elizabeth's 1953 coronation. The sawmill soon returned to Longworth.

=== Community ===
Comprising minimal residents, recipients collected their mail from either Longworth or Penny. The population peaked at about 50 in 1929, but dwindled into the Great Depression, and was almost a ghost town by the mid-1940s. Children attended school in either Longworth or Penny, a four-to-five-mile (6.4 to 8.0 km) walk each way for most students. These were also social venues. When Penny, a settlement and station not originally planned by the GTP, took root, it shadowed Lindup's future. George & Helen Wlasitz were the final permanent residents. The back-to-the-land movement, which peaked during the 1970s, likely prompted the brief reopening of the flag stop.

=== Crime, calamity & safety measures ===
In 1934, the partial remains of a man were found in bush near Lindup. Wildlife had torn apart the victim, a former Penny relief camp resident, who had apparently committed suicide.

That year, trapper/loggers Joseph Pastor (1896–1982) and Joseph Kobra (1902–65), Hungarians, were sentenced to one month's imprisonment for assaulting a police officer in the discharge of his duty. In an unrelated offence, Kobra was sentenced to two months hard labour for relief fraud during 1931. He continued to flout the law by running his three-wheeled homemade speeder on the railway line. He was one of the few who not only drank the muddy Fraser water, but proclaimed its qualities. Pastor, followed by Kobra, resettled in Penny.

In the summer of 1938, a transient walking the railway track started a forest fire between Longworth and Lindup, prompting a precautionary temporary evacuation of the latter. The blaze quickly spotted, a crew of 100 volunteers (largely drawn from Longworth) brought it under control.

=== Relief camps ===
The Aleza Lake to Tête Jaune highway-construction relief project began in 1931. The seven camps between Aleza Lake and McBride housed 500 workers. Nearby relief camps operated at Miles 72 and around 76.5 (occupying the former GTP construction camps at the then Miles 162 and 166). Inhabitants built a road alongside the railway track and a ski hill at Mile 74, both of which fell into disuse.
