= Longworth station =

Railway station in British Columbia, Canada

Longworth

General information
- Location: Longworth, British Columbia; Canada
- Coordinates: 53°55′20.2″N 121°28′48.6″W
- Platforms: 1

Construction
- Structure type: Sign post

History
- Former names: Grand Trunk Pacific Railway

Services
Preceding station	Via Rail	Following station
Hutton toward Prince Rupert	Jasper–Prince Rupert	Penny toward Jasper

Former services
Preceding station	Canadian National Railway	Following station
Hutton toward Prince Rupert	Prince Rupert – Jasper	Lindup toward Jasper
Location
- Location within British Columbia Location within Canada

Longworth station is on the Canadian National Railway mainline in Longworth, British Columbia. Via Rail's Jasper–Prince Rupert train calls at the station as a flag stop.

== History ==
Longworth, like Hutton to its northwest, and Lindup to its southeast, was an original train station (1914) on the Grand Trunk Pacific Railway (the Canadian National Railway after nationalization). The name, a locational surname of Anglo-Saxon origin, deriving from any one of the places called "Longworth" in Berkshire, Herefordshire, or Lancashire, was probably selected from the list prepared by Josiah Wedgwood (submitted at the request of William P. Hinton, the railway's general manager).

Longworth lies at Mile 79.4, Fraser Subdivision (about Mile 169 during the line's construction). New arrivals for the Mile 172 camp and those passing through to Mile 166 (northwest of Lindup) often become lost on the forest trails.

An interesting example of track maintenance workers was the 1936 section crew. The image shows John Prudun (1902–81) (left background), George Wlasitz (1891–1962) (left foreground), Peter Doonchoff (c.1883–1945) (foreman: centre background), Steve Wlasitz (1919–2008) (right foreground), and Steve Bylycia (1899–1956) (right background). Subjects who advanced to section foremen were John Prudun at Hansard and Steve Bylycia at Hutton. George Wlasitz of Lindup, who remained a section hand, would at least have employment throughout the Great Depression and go on to qualify for a 20-year pass that allowed free travel on Canada and U.S. railroads. His son Steve would qualify for a 10-year pass that allowed free travel within Canada for the family, before resigning for a better paying sawmill job.

Built in 1914, the standard-design Plan 100-152 (Bohi's Type E) station building was demolished in 1969. Longworth, and similarly isolated communities, unsuccessfully appealed when the Prince George-McBride way freight ceased operations in 1977. These crews, who knew everyone along the line, would often stop beside residents' homes, especially where heavy groceries needed carrying.

Although CNR trains struck straying livestock, wildlife was a greater problem. During one 24-hour period in 1982, collisions with trains killed 17 caribou near Longworth. Steep snow banks along the rail lines made it all but impossible for moose and caribou to get off the track in time. Over a three-week period, 30 caribou and 150 moose were estimated to have been killed in the area. The reported deaths of 1,000 moose in a previous year was reckoned an understatement.

The remaining passenger shelter went in 1996.

Service	1914–15	1916–c.1917	c.1918–c.1921	c.1921–c.1923	c.1924–1931	1932–42	1943–c.1958	c.1959–1965	1965–66	1966–77	1977–present
Passenger	Reg. stop	Flag stop	Flag stop	Flag stop	Regular stop		Regular stop	Flag stop	Reg. stop	Flag stop	Flag stop
Way freight	Flag prob.	Flag stop	Reg. probably	Regular stop	Reg. probably	Reg. stop	Regular stop	Regular stop	Reg. stop	Reg. stop	

Siding	Mile No.	1922	1933	1943	1960	1965	1968–72	1977	1990–92
(Capacity Length)		Cars	Cars	Cars	Cars	Cars	Cars	Feet	Feet
Longworth	79.4	67	65	57	52	125	125	5,750	6,230

Other Tracks	Mile No.	1920	1922	1960	1965–68
(Capacity Length)		Cars	Cars	Cars	Cars
Berg Sawmills	79.4			4	
Longworth	79.4				20
UGG Sawmills	80.4	Unknown	Unknown		
UGG Sawmills?	82.5	Unknown			
