= Longworth, British Columbia =

- Locality
- Location of Longworth in British Columbia
- Coordinates: 53°55′00″N 121°28′00″W
- Country: Canada
- Province: British Columbia
- Land District: Cariboo
- Regional District: Fraser-Fort George
- Geographic Region: Robson Valley
- Elevation: 665 m (2,182 ft)
- Time zone: UTC−07:00 (PT)
- Area codes: 250, 778, 236, & 672

Longworth comprises scattered houses in a settlement between Sinclair Mills and Penny on the northeast side of the Fraser River in central British Columbia. Containing less than 15 permanent residents, a community hall, and former schoolhouse housing the post office, the location is a jumping-off point for outdoor recreational activities. Longworth Peak is the highest mountain in the Dezaiko Ranges and is prominent above the community.

== Transportation ==
A trackside signpost marks Longworth station, a flag stop for Via Rail's Jasper – Prince Rupert train. The immediate Via Rail stops are Hutton to the northwest and Penny to the southeast.

== History ==
=== Railway ===
Longworth, like Hutton to its northwest, and Lindup to its southeast, was an original train station (1914) on the Grand Trunk Pacific Railway (the Canadian National Railway after nationalization). The name, a locational surname of Anglo-Saxon origin, deriving from any one of the places called "Longworth" in Berkshire, Herefordshire, or Lancashire, was probably selected from the list prepared by Josiah Wedgwood (submitted at the request of William P. Hinton, the railway's general manager).

Longworth lies at Mile 79.4, Fraser Subdivision (about Mile 169 during the line's construction). New arrivals for the Mile 172 camp and those passing through to Mile 166 (northwest of Lindup) often become lost on the forest trails.

An interesting example of track maintenance workers was the 1936 section crew. The image shows John Prudun (1902–81) (left background), George Wlasitz (1891–1962) (left foreground), Peter Doonchoff (c.1883–1945) (foreman: centre background), Steve Wlasitz (1919–2008) (right foreground), and Steve Bylycia (1899–1956) (right background). Subjects who advanced to section foremen were John Prudun at Hansard and Steve Bylycia at Hutton. George Wlasitz of Lindup, who remained a section hand, would at least have employment throughout the Great Depression and go on to qualify for a 20-year pass that allowed free travel on Canada and U.S. railroads. His son Steve would qualify for a 10-year pass that allowed free travel within Canada for the family, before resigning for a better paying sawmill job.

Built in 1914, the standard-design Plan 100-152 (Bohi's Type E) station building was demolished in 1969. Longworth, and similarly isolated communities, unsuccessfully appealed when the Prince George-McBride way freight ceased operations in 1977. These crews, who knew everyone along the line, would often stop beside residents' homes, especially where heavy groceries needed carrying.

Although CNR trains struck straying livestock, wildlife was a greater problem. During one 24-hour period in 1982, collisions with trains killed 17 caribou near Longworth. Steep snow banks along the rail lines made it all but impossible for moose and caribou to get off the track in time. Over a three-week period, 30 caribou and 150 moose were estimated to have been killed in the area. The reported deaths of 1,000 moose in a previous year was reckoned an understatement.

The remaining passenger shelter went in 1996.

| Service | 1914–15 | 1916–c.1917 | c.1918–c.1921 | c.1921–c.1923 | c.1924–1931 | 1932–42 | 1943–c.1958 | c.1959–1965 | 1965–66 | 1966–77 | 1977–present |
|---|---|---|---|---|---|---|---|---|---|---|---|
| Passenger | Reg. stop | Flag stop | Flag stop | Flag stop | Regular stop | | Regular stop | Flag stop | Reg. stop | Flag stop | Flag stop |
| Way freight | Flag prob. | Flag stop | Reg. probably | Regular stop | Reg. probably | Reg. stop | Regular stop | Regular stop | Reg. stop | Reg. stop | |

| Siding | Mile No. | 1922 | 1933 | 1943 | 1960 | 1965 | 1968–72 | 1977 | 1990–92 |
|---|---|---|---|---|---|---|---|---|---|
| (Capacity Length) | | Cars | Cars | Cars | Cars | Cars | Cars | Feet | Feet |
| Longworth | 79.4 | 67 | 65 | 57 | 52 | 125 | 125 | 5,750 | 6,230 |

| Other Tracks | Mile No. | 1920 | 1922 | 1960 | 1965–68 |
|---|---|---|---|---|---|
| (Capacity Length) | | Cars | Cars | Cars | Cars |
| Berg Sawmills | 79.4 | | | 4 | |
| Longworth | 79.4 | | | | 20 |
| UGG Sawmills | 80.4 | Unknown | Unknown | | |
| UGG Sawmills? | 82.5 | Unknown | | | |

=== Forestry ===
The narrow strip of accessible spruce forest bordering the railway that stretched some 100 miles (160 km) east of Prince George was known as the East Line. In the 1920s, with logging limited to the winter and fall seasons to facilitate the hauling of logs by horse or oxen over snow and ice, loggers were transient. However, year round work existed in sawmill towns such as Giscome, Aleza Lake, Hutton, Penny and Longworth.

The first sawmill was built about 1915. In partnership as the Jaeck-Allen Lumber Co., Allen constructed their mill in 1919. One family was Bessie (1878–1949) & Wallace (Wally) N. Jaeck (1876–1954), later at Bend, with son C. Earl Jaeck (1904–52), also later at Bend. The other family was Robert (Bob) (1885–1950) & M. Olive (1891–1977) Allen, with children Florence (1912–85), Ethel (c.1914–?), Robert (c.1918–?), Enid (1920–90), Hazel (c.1921–?), and Harry (c.1921–?). In 1921, Wally acquired the Longworth Lumber Co. from a Mr. Trimble. In 1923, the Jaeck-Allen partnership dissolved when Allen joined Frederick (Fred) Thrasher (1890–1967) (the mill's former accountant) in a sawmill venture at Snowshoe, 3.1 miles (5.0 km) from Loos. Labour shortages at Longworth, forced the mill to drop the night shift initially, and later to erect a boarding house and rooming house to address the limited accommodation for employees and visitors.

Jack Turnbull (probably 1878–1964) ran logging camps for the company during the 1925/26 winter. Following the severe 1927 forest fires, a lookout opened in 1929. This building still exists four miles (6.4 km) away on top of Longworth Mountain. That year, the Longworth mill worked double shifts, but US lumber duties loomed, and the mill closed in 1932. In 1935, Donald (Don) S. McPhee (1892–1964), formerly at Sinclair Mills, and A. Roy Spurr (1885–1954), formerly at Penny, partners in the Giscome mill, acquired the bankrupt Longworth Lumber Co., and relocated the equipment to the Hudson Bay Spur (Upper Fraser). Longtime resident John Flotten (1896–1987) and Torsten Berg (1912–2007), who would later mill at Lindup, were pole producers.. The return of logging in 1937 provided a vital outlet for the farmers' produce. Don McPhee managed the summer and winter logging camps established between Toneko Lake and the Fraser. Karl (Carl alternate spelling) Anderson (1906–94), and C. Gunnar Johnson (1911–82), son/stepson of Carl & Alice Caroline (c.1900–1945) Johnson, held the contract to build the plank road for hauling to a point where logs could float downriver to a mill. Robert Allen operated his crew three miles (4.8 km) from Longworth during the 1938/39 and 1939/40 winters, before relocating his equipment back to Snowshoe. In 1942, the Sinclair Spruce summer camp was in the vicinity. Carl Johnson, who purchased the former mill site with plans to renovate the houses, resold the properties to Karl Anderson.

Injury and death were common in sawmills and logging camps. Falling trees fatally crushed loggers Carl G. Johannson (c.1886–1925) and William Stack (possibly Slack) (c.1900–1925). Kicks from horses used for hauling sent several men to hospital. Another year, a falling log broke logger Harold Mallery's (1916–2000) leg, and a falling tree fatally injured Everett Martin (c.1911–1939). At C.A. Berg's sawmill, near Longworth, while jumping from a snowplowing tractor, Kenneth D. Wilson (1920–56) was fatally crushed between the tracks and hydraulic cylinder.

In 1965, logging operator Torsten Berg was fined for omitting some employee earnings from his Unemployment Insurance Commission records.

In 1981, the government established a 478,683-hectare provincial forest at Longworth.

=== Farming ===
Lennox Thompson (1879–1960), who farmed 1918–40, kept poultry and grew strawberries and hay.

In 1924, Wilson A. (1880–1959) & Mary (c.1883–1939) Riggs arrived. Their children were Annie Armanda (1905–70), George W. A. (1907–78), Harold E. (c.1910–?), Wilbert A. (1912–99), later of Penny, Lillian Oliveria Pearl (1914–85), Arthur (c.1917–1987), Clara Margaret (c.1921–?), William, Ernest, and Dorothy. The family residence became a focal point of the community. Their expanding farm comprised vegetable crops and dairy cattle. In 1937, Wilson was the first local farmer to ship cream to the Interior Creamery at Prince George, expanding to a local six-farm source by 1940. These farmers' purebred Ayrshires gained renown. He was also active in advancing the farming community.

Logger and farmer William Henry (1888–1949) & Estella (1890–1946) Turner arrived around 1924. Their children were Thelma (c.1917–?), R.D. (1918–94), Earl (1919–84), Ronald (1921–88), Ernest E. (1923–56), who drowned at Hansard, Wallace, Herbert (1926–53), who died in a traffic accident at Prince George, Naomi, Alberteen, and Helen. Ronald and his parents were residents until death. R.D. legally changed his name to Ardie Keith.

Gratian (1873–1970) & Mary (1878–1937) Mueller arrived around 1924. Their children were Mary (1898–1987), Emma (1900–88), Gratian (c.1903–1938), Edward (1904–94), Paul (1907–97), Raymond (1909–98), Dorothy (c.1911–?), Ann (c.1914–?), Joseph (c.1917–?), Rose (c.1919–?), Theresa (1920–?), John (1923–2017), and Liz. Gratian Sr. and W.H. Turner were the only local farmers who did not avail themselves of the free initial TB testing of their herds.

Raymond (Ray) married Louisa Hutchinson (1918–2016). When they moved to Sinclair Mills in 1943, Ray drew upon his river experience to raft their home downriver through the Grand Canyon rapids. Joseph (Joe) Mueller, Mary & George (1889–1983) Kuchler, and Edward Mueller probably left a little earlier, and John finally a decade later. Paul & Marjorie (1919–2009) moved to Prince George in 1956, but for many years divided their time between the homestead and town.

Theresa (Tracy) married Charles (Charlie) McCoy (c.1915–?). When she retired as postmaster in 1985, she had held the position (assumed on a temporary basis) for 30 years. A former sawmill office skidded down the track from Lindup, the 10- by 12-foot hut (which she owned) served as the post office. Their children were Bob and Wayne. By 2018, Bob had been a resident for 76 years.

Wallace's brother, Leonard H. Jaeck (1880–1958), later at Bend, farmed 1931–36, and kept a herd of dairy goats. He was formerly the blacksmith at the mill.

=== Community ===
The 1918 population estimate of 30, increased to 60 by 1920, 75 to 100 by 1924–25, 150 by 1926, and 200 by 1927. Arthur E.C. Read (1888–1945) (Reid alternate spelling), a storeowner during the late 1910s, was the inaugural postmaster 1915–20, but the post office remained closed for 15 of those months. Commonly, the postmaster in such towns was also a storeowner. He then spent three years in Hutton. In 1923, Alice Irene Black (1893–1996) married Arthur. By 1924, the town boasted a church (parson visited from McBride), school, dancehall, general store and poolroom. A local symphony orchestra provided music for the dances held every two weeks. First mentions of a body returning for burial, and the cemetery itself, are 1921 and 1937 respectively. Burials still occur at this location.

The Longworth school opened in 1921 with Miss Doris Webb as the inaugural teacher. Built in 1920 on land donated by the mill, the 38' x 16' frame building was extended eight feet in 1924 to accommodate increased attendance. The 1931 enrolment comprised 33 students in Grades 1–9. Opened in 1927 about 2 miles (3.2 km) from Longworth on the river, the Longworth South community hall housed both a new school and community activities.

Arriving in 1921, Sidney (Sid) T. (1876–1962) & Lulu (1883–1961) Coats ran a general store, with Sid as postmaster 1922–35. Lulu was a sister-in-law of Wallace N. Jaeck. The store closed when the mill folded during the Great Depression. Daughter Elizabeth (1906–91) married local Rory (Roy) R.M. McGillivray (1903–94), who would later be at Bend.

In the late 1920s, storeowner Arthur Read became a notary public, but a 1931 fire destroyed his business premises. After he opened the 10-bedroomed Toneko Lodge a year later, he relocated the general store into this hotel, and later the post office, when postmaster 1935–45. During 1937, the proprietor regularly advertised the lodge and later the combined lodge and general store (which served as a retail and wholesale distributor of grains and flour). He was the first president of the Yellowhead Highway Association, an advocacy group formed in 1936 to create a highway link, which all came to naught when the government surveyed a route wholly west of the river for the Fraser-Fort George section of Highway 16. In ill health, Arthur sold the business, and died weeks later. He had arrived in the district as part of a railway construction crew, been postmaster for a total of 17 years, and been a guide for big game hunting. New owner Cecil Alcock (probably 1902–75) was postmaster 1945–50, and the family kept poultry, and bred rabbits.

In the wintertime, competitive cross-country and downhill skiing was the major sport. In 1938, the young people organized a badminton club, and the community club purchased a movie projector. At the initial screening, which comprised several short reels, the packed Longworth Hall attracted a number from Penny. That year, after a badminton tournament, the Sinclair Mills team stayed to watch a movie. On another occasion, the badminton club organized a dance in the community hall. The boys' and girls' dairy calf club, formed in 1937, also held fundraising dances. Neighbouring communities visited one another's dances. The population, numbering 129 in the mid-1940s, had shrunk to 65 a decade later.

The Longworth School and the Longworth South School, which often held combined events, amalgamated for the 1939/40 year as the United Rural Longworth School. The new building at the crossroads site was completed at a cost of $1,000 for the 1941/42 year. The school was closed for the 1942/43 year. In 1955, teacherages were built and equipped. The school struggled to secure a teacher for the 1958/59 year. Catering for Grades 1–8, numbers were 9–13 for 1945–53, and 8–13 for 1955–65. The school closed in 1966. The school at Sinclair Mills closed in 1984, Upper Fraser in 1998, and elementary education became centralized at Giscome from 1999, except for distance-learning students.

In 1990, ownership of the two-hectare former school land, passed to the RDFFG to create a community park with ball field. Students completed correspondence courses in the former schoolhouse, and residents regularly used the more recently built community hall for various activities. A previous hall dated from the 1930s.

"Longstock", formerly called "Hot As Hell Bonfire Dance", was an annual musical festival held at the community hall 1992–2001.

By 2000, a population of 23, occupied the 21 dwellings. Steadily declining, 13 permanent residents remained by 2018.

=== Crime, Calamity & Safety Measures ===
In 1924, an agitator among the Hindu community alleged a mail theft, but the subsequent charges were dismissed. That year, the town suffered a measles epidemic, and a whooping cough epidemic in 1937.

Although only a single mention of a house burning to the ground, it was likely a common occurrence.

In 1955, the partly decomposed body of a lone homesteader was found with a rifle shot to the head. Nels Adolf Sjolund (1898–1955), postmaster in 1955, proprietor of the Toneko Lodge, and part owner of the general store, committed suicide in a like manner that year.

A resident for 43 years, teamster Orva (1889–1963) & Mabel (1888–1955) Prather came in 1921. Their children were Iva Pearl (1917–2012), Marjory (1919–2009), Oliver (1921-2015), Gladys, Julia, Pauline (1928–58), and Arnold (1929–2013). Buried at Longworth are Orva, Mabel, Pauline and her son, and Arnold and his wife. Pauline and son Raymond (1946–58) died at the hands of husband John Melynchuk in a murder, suicide at Cloverdale. Iva Pearl married Torsten Berg. When a companion's loaded .22-calibre rifle accidentally discharged two miles (3.2 km) east, while on a hunting trip, younger son R. Peter Berg (1956–67) suffered a fatal shoulder wound. Older son Carl Berg (1936–87) died of cirrhosis.

Harold Olsson (1895–1971) was mauled by a bear on a trail from his cabin, near Longworth, to Toneko Lake. A broken rib fatally punctured a lung.

In 1976, when two-year-old Seth Allen became separated from his parents in the Hungary Creek area, he spent a night alone in the bush, before a search effort by the 35-person community found the infant. Three years earlier, Thad, Seth's father, was a key organizer of a back-to-nature summer camp for urban children that was held in Longworth.

The following year, Lawrence (Larry) Gaylord, of Longworth, was arrested in Prince George and charged with trafficking, after police found a pound of marijuana in his hotel room. His friend, Joseph Carmen Marvici, obtained counsel and appeared in court for him. Gaylord was remanded in custody and ultimately deported to Alaska. When police conducted a search and found some 300 pounds of marijuana about 0.5 miles (0.8 km) from Marvici's Longworth farm, he was charged with cultivating marijuana. After the charges were stayed, Marvici laid a formal complaint of harassment against the RCMP. Although not determined criminal, the two drug squad officers' irresponsible conduct instigated disciplinary action.

=== Roads ===
To extend the existing Prince George-Aleza Lake highway, the 30 miles (48 km) to Longworth were cleared, grubbed and rough graded during 1929–31. However, the rapid deterioration of the road, culverts and bridges, made it largely impassable beyond Hansard. By 1938, proper grading was completed to within 2.5 miles (4.0 km) of Longworth. The 1941 grading of the remainder by a logging operator encouraged bicycle sales. Although Hansard-Sinclair Mills was later gravelled, Sinclair Mills-Longworth was left to deteriorate. Road maps shows the route terminating just south of Sinclair Mills. In 1960, the provincial conservative candidate brought two horses in a car trailer to Sinclair Mills, and campaigned the next 35 miles (56 km) southeast by horseback. The railway continued to provide the only year-round accessibility.

In a 1981 survey, the residents of Longworth and Penny opposed the proposal for a reaction ferry at Penny.

During 1986–87, the road and bridges on the Sinclair Mills-Longworth section were rebuilt to create a "fair weather" road, leaving the community still dependent upon the railway in the wet season. With one hill impassable for a week, a lot of the 1992 work by the highway maintenance contractor was undone by the fall rains, owing to the growing number of logging trucks breaking up the road. Although residents had no expectation of a paved road, they counted upon a well-maintained solid gravel base. That year, the Hutton Road thoroughfare was renamed the Upper Fraser Road. Over the following decade, not only was this section of gravel road still in poor shape, but the whole distance as far northwest as the Hansard Bridge was barely drivable. Nowadays, it is considered a good gravel road.

=== Electricity, Broadcast Transmissions & Communications Devices ===
In 1924, residents installed radios for the upcoming broadcasts from the cities.

From 1929, the CNR telephone lines (which in 1914 connected Prince George with all GTP points east), opened for public usage, linking Dome Creek with Prince George. In the late 1950s, CNR erected a relay transmitter station at Longworth for its new microwave radio system. The CN network from Giscome still provided the public phone service by 1980. In 1993, residents unanimously approved the referendum for a local telephone service, at a cost of under $216,390 for the community. Owing to the capital cost to Telus, even with government subsidies, negotiations dragged on for eight years. When installed in 1999, the costs to each household was $20,000. However, until 2001, when the company added an independent power source to eliminate power surges, lengthy service interruptions often occurred.

A new transmitter, installed by CKPG-TV on Mount Tabor in 1964, provided reception as far southeast as Longworth & Penny.

A few homes or businesses had diesel generators for electricity. In 1989, after 13 of the 26 eligible voters voted unanimously in favour, BC Hydro constructed an electrical distribution line to the community.
