= Hutton, British Columbia =

- Railway Point
- Location of Hutton in British Columbia
- Coordinates: 53°59′00″N 121°37′00″W
- Country: Canada
- Province: British Columbia
- Land District: Cariboo
- Regional District: Fraser-Fort George
- Geographic Region: Robson Valley
- Elevation: 624 m (2,047 ft)
- Area codes: 250, 778, 236, & 672

Hutton nestles in the foothills of the Rocky Mountains about four miles (6.4 km) north-northeast of the Grand Canyon of the Fraser, in central British Columbia. Moxley Creek, a tributary on the northeast side of the Fraser River, passes to the southwest. The former mill and village site is private property, whose owners remain the sole occupants. Surviving structures are some concrete foundations of mill buildings and the railway water tower (relocated from beside the tracks).

== Transportation ==
A trackside signpost marks the flag stop for Via Rail's Jasper – Prince Rupert train. The immediate Via Rail stops are Sinclair Mills to the northwest and Longworth to the southeast.

The station was formerly known as Hutton Mills.

== History ==
=== Railway ===
Hutton, like Dewey to its northwest, and Longworth to its southeast, was an original train station (1914) on the Grand Trunk Pacific Railway (the Canadian National Railway after nationalization). Named by Sir Alfred Smithers, chair of the GTP board, his reason for choosing the name is unknown.

=== Forestry ===
In 1913, William (Bill) A. Willits (Willots alternate spelling), who owned a number of timber limits on the upper Fraser, established a sawmill. However, the reference to its 80,000-foot per shift capacity is clearly a confusion with the 1917 mill built by the Grain Growers' Grain Company (GGGC), an enterprise on the cusp of merging with the Alberta Farmers' Co-operative Elevator Company (AFCEC) to form the United Grain Growers (UGG). The company had acquired a significant local timber limit in 1913, or possibly 1911. Since the millpond, created by damming Wolf Creek, was 2.3 miles (3.7 km) from the closest point on the Fraser, using the river to float logs to the mill was not an option. Instead, the company acquired a 47-ton shay locomotive and laid trackage for its standard gauge logging railway. Facing a similar predicament, Giscome Spruce Mills (GSM) would also choose this hauling mode that equally proved uneconomic for the low timber volumes per acre. In spring 1918, the sawmill and planing mill began production. By January of the following year, UGG employed 300 millworkers and loggers in the area.

Union activity swept the region during the post-war period. In April 1919, to guard against sabotage, the mill restricted employee access to the property outside normal working hours, and engaged armed security that had the powers of special constables. In October, guided by mill manager Mark DeCew (DeCue alternate spelling), a party accompanying the Duke of Devonshire, governor-general 1916–21, viewed the facility. The Lumber Workers Industrial Union targeted the railway tie camps during this era. In March 1920, the union won some gains from management at the UGG logging camps near Hutton. However, these were not binding contracts and had little lasting impact.

The narrow strip of accessible spruce forest bordering the railway that stretched some 100 miles (160 km) east of Prince George was known as the East Line. In the 1920s, with logging limited to the winter and fall seasons to facilitate the hauling of logs over snow and ice, loggers were transient. However, year round work existed in sawmill towns such as Giscome, Aleza Lake, Hutton, Penny and Longworth. Injury and death were common in sawmills and logging camps.

The company soon discovered its original strategy of selling lumber directly to Prairie farmers (UGG shareholders) was flawed. Ordering carloads in advance was inconvenient for farmers, and prairie lumber dealers refused to handle the product, because it circumvented their own distribution channels. UGG also realized the mill was poorly located, servicing stands of extremely knotted cedar and hemlock, and the lumber operations were incurring a $78,352 loss annually by 1922. From 1921, the company logged at Eaglet Lake, east of Giscome. That year, logs scattered along the lakeshore when a boom holding two million feet of UGG logs broke loose. A legal action followed when suspicions arose as to whether GSM was keeping an accurate count of the UGG logs it was milling. When GSM fenced off a road passing through one of its logging lots to block UGG access, the courts quashed the action, because it was a public thoroughfare. Using a donkey engine and cables at a facility two miles (3.2 km) east of Giscome station, the UGG could load two trainloads daily for transportation via the CNR line. In mid-1923, a log-carrying train was arriving daily at Hutton. That year, the mill was producing 80,000 feet of lumber each day. A planned new dry lumber shed, with a one-million-foot storage capacity, would increase efficiency by replacing the dry kilns in operation from the beginning. When the company reduced wage rates the following year, a number of employees quit.

The 1925 fire completely destroyed the UGG sawmill, but the planer, a portable sawmill, and lumber yard, were saved. Until this time, it joined Giscome and Sinclair Mills as the dominant mills on the East Line. Initially, the horses were sold. Choosing not to rebuild, UGG sold off its logs, lumber, machinery and equipment. During the 1925/26 winter, Etter & McDougall logged in the vicinity of Hutton. By early 1928, UGG had shipped out its remaining lumber and closed down all operations. That winter, Jack Turnbull (probably 1878–1964) ran an 80-man camp one mile (1.6 km) to the west for Sinclair Spruce Mills. A planer mill and a portable sawmill continued to operate into the 1930s. During World War II, such a mill processed birch for the Tego-bonded plywood and birch veneer of the "Mosquito" warplane.

Charles Howarth (1885–1994), a mechanical draftsman, managed the construction of grain elevators in Alberta and Saskatchewan for the AFCEC. In 1921, the company appointed him general manager of the Hutton mill. On leaving, he acquired and ran the Arrow Lakes Lumber Co. at Nakusp 1927–36, but the business succumbed to the Great Depression. A partner in the Babine Lumber Co. at Burns Lake from the late 1930s, he purchased the Guilford Lumber Co. in 1943.

In 1974, Northwood donated a pioneer steam donkey and a pole railway car, recovered from Hutton, to the Prince George Railway & Forestry Museum. The car once carried logs stacked in a triangular formation upon a track formed from poles laid end-to-end.

=== Community ===
The community held regular dances in its early years. The post office, which opened at the Hutton Mills in 1917, assumed the sawmill name. William (Bill) A. Willits was postmaster 1917–18. Consequently, the school, and later electoral district, took that name. Initially, the two names were used interchangeably for the village and surrounding area, but Hutton was used predominantly. However, pioneer rural families, such as the Chance generations, consistently described themselves as from Hutton Mills, whereas outsiders usually considered them as from Hutton. Since the postal area officially changed to the latter in 1960, Hutton Mills has been rarely used.

Population estimates were 175 (Wrigley) to 300 (Rev. W.J. Patton) for 1918, and 275 (Wrigley) to 400 (Dep. Insp. Parsons) for 1919. A school, store, and hospital existed. When the school opened that year, S. Oswald Harries (1886–1981) taught the 31 students. Church services were held in the schoolhouse, as were dances. The 1926 student body numbered 28. During the 1920s, a laundry and bakery also operated.

By 1920, unlike Prince George, the hospital possessed an X-ray machine. Dr. Rex E. Page was district medical health officer. Dr. Wilfrid Laishley (1900–60) then headed the hospital until his transfer to Giscome as district medical officer and coroner. Dr. G.E. Bayfield (1874–1947) took over the daily routine until Dr. J.W. Lang became district medical officer. When Coroner Laishley held the inquest into the death of James Brown, whose body was found in an unused stable near Hutton, the verdict was death from natural causes.

Percy Moore (1871–1954) ran the mill's general store. Accompanied by wife Lois (1875–1968), and daughter Ruth (c.1912–?), he relocated to Stuart in 1920, where he opened the first store and became postmaster. The destination was renamed Finmoore in 1923, which combined the names of postmaster Moore, and pioneer farmer Ronald Finlaison (1875–1948).

Arthur E.C. Read (1888–1945) (Reid alternate spelling), formerly and later at Longworth, was the mill purchasing agent and store manager for three years. Although he was regarded as postmaster, because he performed these duties, T.J. Largue (1886–1961) company accountant, officially held the title 1918–26. Read was the recognized guide for big game hunters within the area. Following a movie showing by Levi Graham of Prince George in 1922, the Hutton orchestra supplied the music for a dance.

The population largely dispersed after the 1925 fire. The estimated 800–1,000 peak appears to be grossly inflated. By 1928, about 65 people remained, before levelling at 30.

While the men remained to fight the severe 1927 forest fire, a flagged freight train temporarily evacuated the women and children from Longworth, and the largely vacated Hutton accommodated many of the evacuees. Once the sawmill closed, the company pool hall, general store and hospital contents were sold. A Chinese laundry existed at this time. Mrs. Winifred Mary Grogan (1896–1991) opened a general store, and became postmaster 1928–29, a role commonly performed by a storeowner in such towns. The post office closed in 1929, re-opened in 1937, and closed for good in 1959.

The school closed in 1942. Edna P. Carter was a teacher during the final years. In 1945, the settlement population numbered 26. After inviting tenders, School District 57 sold the building in 1960. By 1950, apart from railway employees, only two farmers, James V. Chance and Frederick (Fred) J. Culliton (1882–1955), remained of the population.

The former mill and village site forms part of Frank & Elke Steinbauer's property. The eight-foot high concrete base for the steam-plant smokestack, sundry concrete foundations, and the water tower remain. Buried medicine bottles in the former hospital area, and rusty cans and aluminum plates around the former sawmill canteen area, evidence the bygone era. In 2004, the family moved the dilapidated former Aleza Lake Catholic Church (built 1949), and reconstructed the building on their property.

=== Crime, Calamity & Safety Measures ===
During the early 1920s, two Hindus were fined, one for drug possession, and another for disorderly conduct during an alleged riot. The Constable Service transferred to McBride at that time.

In 1931, when their speeder struck and killed a moose, a number of residents travelling to a dance at Longworth suffered injuries. Attending dances in surrounding communities continued a common pastime.

Stevan (Steve) (1884–1969) & Stanicia (1899–1983) Utjesenovich lost daughter Annca (Annie) (1933–36). The following year, the family lost all their possessions in a house fire. In 1939, William (Bill) Chance (1921–62), later at Upper Fraser, and his brother Jim, came too close when photographing a bull moose. The animal chased the two youths and two section employees who intervened, before the beast sauntered away.

The station building provided a respite, especially during inclement weather. In 1960, eastbound passenger Romain D'Auteuil (1916–70) had failed to awaken in time for his Sinclair Mills destination. Alighting the train at Hutton, he lingered for hours in the waiting room prior to commencing his 3.2-mile (5.1 km) return walk. When ejected before dawn for obnoxious behavior, he smashed a station window with a rock, garnering a $5 fine plus $18.91 for damages.

=== Roads ===
Situated on the Sinclair Mills-Longworth section of road, Hutton shared similar accessibility issues as Longworth, but at times, the road west of Hutton was in moderately better condition. In 1992, the Hutton Road was renamed the Upper Fraser Road.

=== Electricity, Broadcast Transmissions & Communications Devices ===
A dispatcher staffed the early telegraph office. By 1921, the railway was stringing telephone wires east of Prince George as far as Hutton, connecting mills and farms along the route with the outside world. A gap in the line east of Aleza Lake, which remained into the following years, prompted demands for lines separate from the railway's ones.

The pre-1990 Longworth section covers the later developments. In the early 1950s, the CBC installed a 25-watt relay transmitter at Hutton to provide better reception for radio listeners in the area.
