= Longworth, Minnesota =

Longworth
- Unincorporated community
- Location within Minnesota Location within the United States
- Coordinates: 48°58′57″N 95°21′54″W
- Country: United States
- State: Minnesota
- County: Roseau
- Elevation: 1,079 ft (329 m)
- Time zone: UTC-6 (Central (CST))
  - Summer (DST): UTC-5 (CDT)
- Area code: 218
- GNIS feature ID: 657205

Longworth is an unincorporated community in Roseau County, in the U.S. state of Minnesota.

== History ==
The community was named for Nicholas Longworth (1869–1931), an American politician.
