= Gilford (surname) =

Gilford is a surname of both English origins and Irish origins from Gilford, County Down Ulster as a locational surname or as a phonetic anglicisation of native Irish Gaelic surnames. Or derived from Guildford, in Surrey.

The name was first recorded as "Gyldeford" in the Anglo-Saxon Chronicles, circa 800 AD, "Guldeford" in the Domesday Book of 1086, and "Geldeford" in the Pipe rolls between 1130 and 1156. The place name means "the ford where golden flowers grow", from the old English elements "gylde", which is a derivative of "gold", and "ford". While primarily recognized as an English locational surname derived from Guildford in Surrey,Hanks, Patrick (2003). Dictionary of American Family Names. Vol. 2. Oxford University Press. p. 62. ISBN 978-0195081374. the surname Gilford also possesses distinct regional origins within Ireland. In Ulster, the name functions as a locational surname linked to the village of Gilford, County Down, which was established in the 17th century by Captain John Magill and historically named after "Magill's ford".Room, Adrian (1989). Dictionary of World Place Names: Derived from British Names. Routledge. p. 67. ISBN 978-0415510639. Additionally, historical Irish genealogical records demonstrate that the surname emerged independently through the phonetic anglicisation of native Gaelic names. Surnames incorporating the prefix Mac Giolla (meaning "son of the servant") or variations like Mac Gafraidh (McCaffrey) were occasionally modified by administrative clerks into phonetically similar English variants, such as Gilford and Gifford.MacLysaght, Edward (1985). The Surnames of Ireland (6th ed.). Irish Academic Press. pp. 17–19. ISBN 978-0716523666.

Notable people with the surname include:

- Darren Gilford (born 1982), Maltese sprinter
- David Gilford (born 1965), English golfer
- Dorothy M. Gilford, American statistician
- Gwynne Gilford (born 1946), American actress
- Hastings Gilford (1861–1941), English surgeon
- Jack Gilford (1908–1990), American actor
- Madeline Lee Gilford (1923–2008), American actress
- Yvonne Gilford (c.1941–1996), Australian nurse murdered in Saudi Arabia
- Zach Gilford (born 1982), American actor
