= Paul Willis Guilford =

American lawyer, judge, and politician

Paul Willis Guilford (January 15, 1876 – February 4, 1956) was an American lawyer, judge, and politician.

== Biography ==
Guilford was born in Minneapolis, Minnesota and went to the Minneapolis public schools. He went to University of Minnesota, to University of Chicago, and to University of Minnesota Law School. Guilford lived in Minneapolis with his wife and family and practiced law in Minneapolis. Guilford served in the Minnesota House of Representatives in 1915 and 1916 and in the Minnesota Senate from 1919 to 1922. He also served as the Hennepin County juvenile judge and district court judge from 1923 to 1955. Guilford also served on the Minneapolis City Charter Commission in 1912 and 1913.
