= Guilford (Frederick, Maryland) =

Historic house in Maryland, United States

- U.S. National Register of Historic Places
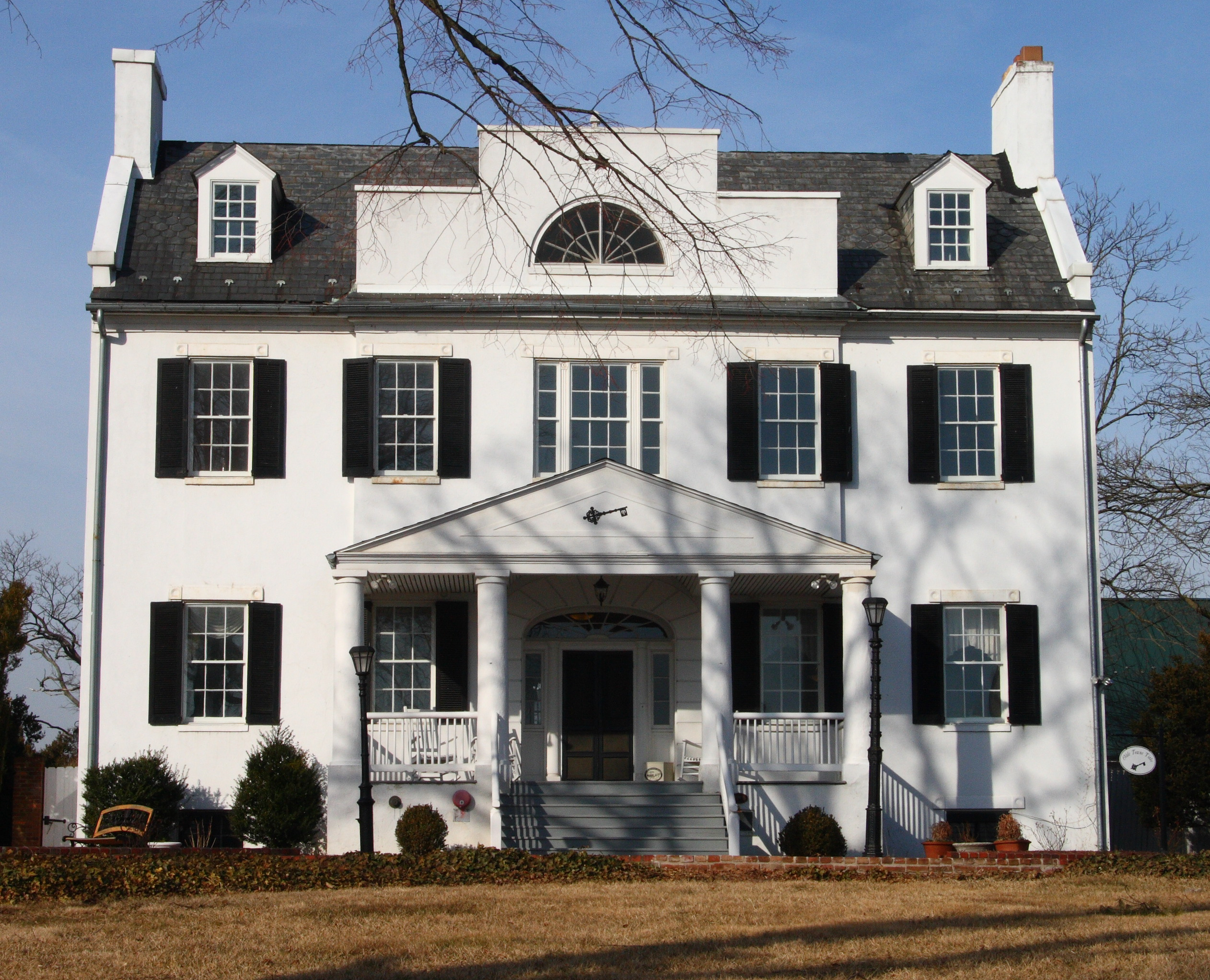
- Guilford, February 2009

- Location within Maryland Location within the United States
- Location: 5900 Frederick Crossing Lane, Frederick, Maryland
- Coordinates: 39°23′43.55″N 77°24′50.93″W
- Area: 4.9 acres (2.0 ha)
- Built: 1820
- Architect: Haller, T. Stuart (Landscape architect)
- Architectural style: Federal, Late Victorian, Classical Revival
- NRHP reference No.: 75000895
- Added to NRHP: October 14, 1975

Guilford is a large country farmhouse near Frederick, Maryland, built in 1809. Formerly the center of a 103-acre (0.42 km^{2}) farm, the brick house retains many of its outbuildings despite its location in the middle of a suburban shopping and office development.

Guilford was listed on the National Register of Historic Places in 1975.
