= Guildford (disambiguation) =

Guildford is a town in Surrey, England. It gives its name to the Borough of Guildford, the Diocese of Guildford and the Parliamentary constituency of Guildford.

Guildford, Guilford, or Gildford may also refer to:

== Places ==
=== Australia ===
- Guildford, New South Wales, a suburb of Sydney
- Guildford, Tasmania
- Guildford, Victoria
- Guildford, Western Australia

=== Canada ===
- Guildford, British Columbia, a neighbourhood in Surrey
- Guilford (railway point), British Columbia

=== United Kingdom ===
- Borough of Guildford, capital of Surrey
- Guildford, a suburb of the town of Hayle in Cornwall

=== United States ===
- Guilford, Connecticut
- Guilford, Illinois
- Guilford, Indiana
- Guilford, Maine, a New England town
  - Guilford (CDP), Maine, the main village in the town
- Guilford, Maryland, in Howard County
- Guilford (Frederick, Maryland), a country farmhouse
- Guilford, Baltimore, Maryland, a neighborhood
- Gildford, Montana
- Guilford, New York
- Guilford County, North Carolina
- Guilford, Vermont
- Guilford (White Post, Virginia), listed on the NRHP in Clarke County, Virginia

== People ==
- Craig Guildford, British police officer
- J. P. Guilford (1897–1988), American psychologist
- Lord Guildford Dudley (1536–1554), husband of Lady Jane Grey
- Jane Guildford (1500s–1555), Duchess of Northumberland, mother of Lord Guilford Dudley
- Paul Willis Guilford (1876-1956), American lawyer, judge, and politician
- Zac Guildford (born 1989), New Zealand rugby player

== Other uses ==
- Guilford Press, an independent publisher based in New York
- Earl of Guilford and Baron Guilford, peerage titles
- Pan Am Systems or Guilford Transportation Industries, a railroad and airline holding company
- Guildford (1810 ship), a vessel that made eight voyages to transport convicts to Australia in the early 19th Century, and that disappeared with all her crew on her way home from her last delivery
- Guildford College, a 16 years - adult college in Guildford, Surrey, United Kingdom
- Mary Guildford (ship), a 1527 English vessel

== See also ==
- Guildford Four, four Irish people wrongly convicted of the 1974 Guildford pub bombings
- Guilford Street in Bloomsbury, London
- Battle of Guilford Court House, a battle fought in 1781 in Greensboro, North Carolina, USA
  - Guilford Courthouse National Military Park, a site maintained by the US National Park Service commemorating the battle
- Guilford College, a college in Greensboro, North Carolina, United States
- Guilford Technical Community College, a college in Guilford County, North Carolina
- Gilford (disambiguation)
