= Crescent Spur, British Columbia =

- Locality
- Location of Crescent Spur in British Columbia
- Coordinates: 53°35′00″N 120°41′00″W
- Country: Canada
- Province: British Columbia
- Regional District: Fraser-Fort George
- Time zone: UTC−07:00 (PT)
- Postal code: V0J 3E0
- Area code: 250 / 778 / 236
- Highways: Highway 16 (TCH) Trans-Canada Highway

Crescent Spur is a community in Robson Valley, British Columbia. It is located northwest of McBride, British Columbia, on the Fraser River. The Grand Trunk Pacific Railway established a station here in 1915 under the name Crescent Island. In 1928, the F.G. Thrasher Company installed a battery of six dry kilns at their sawmill, marking the introduction of dry kilns in this district. A post office was opened 29 December 1944. It was closed 21 July 1969, re-opened 15 January 1975, and then closed for good 9 March 1977.

== Climate ==
Crescent Spur is located in a snow and rain belt, and gets significantly more precipitation than areas to the west like Prince George. The number of days with precipitation during the height of summer is higher than anywhere else in Canada. Crescent Spur gets measurable precipitation for 21.8 days on average in July, which is the highest in Canada.

Climate data for Crescent Spur
Month	Jan	Feb	Mar	Apr	May	Jun	Jul	Aug	Sep	Oct	Nov	Dec	Year
Record high °C (°F)	11.5 (52.7)	12.5 (54.5)	20.0 (68.0)	27.5 (81.5)	33.0 (91.4)	33.0 (91.4)	34.0 (93.2)	35.0 (95.0)	29.0 (84.2)	24.5 (76.1)	16.0 (60.8)	8.0 (46.4)	35.0 (95.0)
Mean daily maximum °C (°F)	−2.7 (27.1)	2.5 (36.5)	6.2 (43.2)	13 (55)	17.9 (64.2)	21.1 (70.0)	22.5 (72.5)	22.1 (71.8)	17.2 (63.0)	9.7 (49.5)	2.3 (36.1)	−1.4 (29.5)	10.9 (51.6)
Daily mean °C (°F)	−6.4 (20.5)	−2.1 (28.2)	0.8 (33.4)	6 (43)	10.3 (50.5)	13.8 (56.8)	15.6 (60.1)	14.9 (58.8)	10.9 (51.6)	5.3 (41.5)	−0.8 (30.6)	−4.5 (23.9)	5.3 (41.5)
Mean daily minimum °C (°F)	−10.1 (13.8)	−6.7 (19.9)	−4.7 (23.5)	−1 (30)	2.5 (36.5)	6.3 (43.3)	8.6 (47.5)	7.6 (45.7)	4.6 (40.3)	0.8 (33.4)	−3.9 (25.0)	−7.6 (18.3)	−0.3 (31.5)
Record low °C (°F)	−41 (−42)	−31.5 (−24.7)	−32 (−26)	−14.5 (5.9)	−6 (21)	−1 (30)	1 (34)	0 (32)	−5 (23)	−13 (9)	−30 (−22)	−38.5 (−37.3)	−41 (−42)
Average precipitation mm (inches)	82.8 (3.26)	38.9 (1.53)	48.2 (1.90)	44.1 (1.74)	60.7 (2.39)	82.8 (3.26)	129.7 (5.11)	77.2 (3.04)	79.2 (3.12)	84.4 (3.32)	72.7 (2.86)	52.4 (2.06)	853.2 (33.59)
Average rainfall mm (inches)	14.6 (0.57)	10.8 (0.43)	21.3 (0.84)	34 (1.3)	58.6 (2.31)	82.8 (3.26)	129.7 (5.11)	77.2 (3.04)	79.2 (3.12)	79.7 (3.14)	32.5 (1.28)	11.5 (0.45)	631.8 (24.87)
Average snowfall cm (inches)	68.3 (26.9)	28.1 (11.1)	26.8 (10.6)	10.1 (4.0)	2.2 (0.9)	0 (0)	0 (0)	0 (0)	0 (0)	4.7 (1.9)	40.3 (15.9)	41 (16)	221.4 (87.2)
Source: Environment Canada
