= Robson Valley =

Valley in British Columbia, Canada

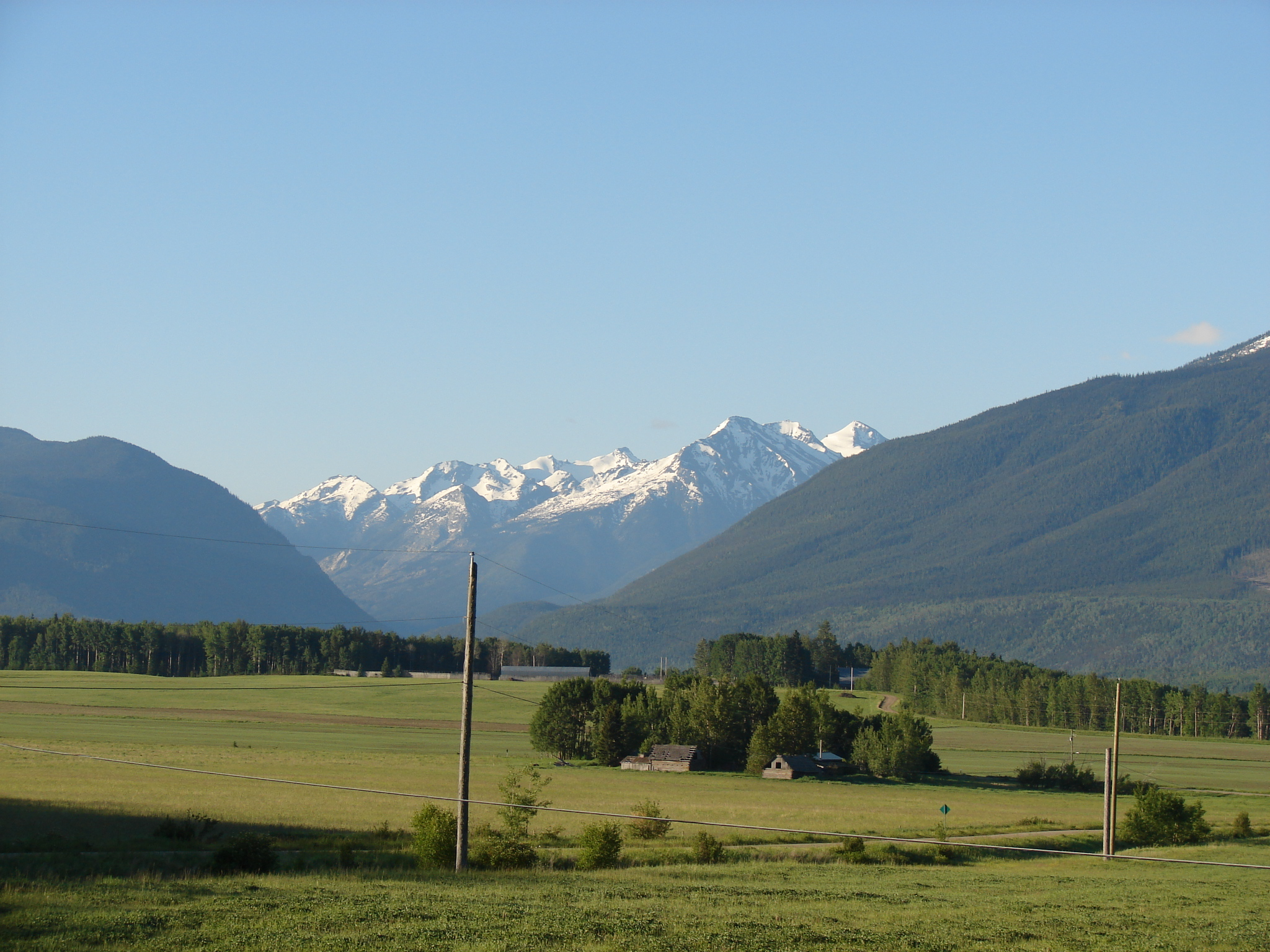
A farm near McBride, BC, with views into the Cariboo Mountains

The Robson Valley is a geographic region of the Canadian province of British Columbia, comprising the section of the Rocky Mountain Trench that lies southeast of the city of Prince George following the Fraser River to the Yellowhead Pass. The name is derived from Mount Robson, which stands near the entrance to the Yellowhead Pass. Communities in the Robson Valley include the settlements of Dome Creek, Crescent Spur, Dunster, and Tête Jaune Cache, with larger population concentrations in the villages of McBride and Valemount. On a map, the Robson Valley is located immediately south of the elbow in the boundary between Alberta and British Columbia. Transportation corridors through the Robson Valley include the Canadian National Railway lines, and Highways 16 and 5.

The Robson Valley is bounded on the south by the Columbia Country, farther south down the Rocky Mountain Trench, and the Thompson Country, via Canoe Pass, and is flanked on its east by the Rocky Mountains and on the west by the Cariboo Mountains.

== First Nations ==
The Robson Valley and the head waters of the Fraser were considered to be the Northern hunting and fishing grounds of the Secwepemc, particularly the Texqa'kallt division.

Anthropologist James Teit noted that a "[Shuswap] band, mixed with Cree, live practically east of the Rocky Mountains; in the neighbourhood of Jasper House, and west to Tête-Jaune Cache." Teit said The Shuswap Band was known as Xexkaʼllt ("those at the top"), "those almost completely nomadic Indians who live nearly in the heart of the Rocky Mountains, around the head waters of North Thompson River, the Yellow Head Pass, and Jasper House. I shall name them the Upper North Thompson band; and the whole division, the North Thompson division. On the west their hunting-grounds are co-extensive with those of the [Canim] Lake division, while east and north they extend along Adams Lake, include Canoe River, part of the Big Bend of the Columbia, part of the Rocky Mountain region (around the head of the Athabasca), and the Upper Fraser country north towards the head of Smoky River nearly to latitude 54° N.

Teit also records a tale of a ten-year war between the Sekani (Tseʼkhene) and the Secwepemc over the head waters of the Fraser. "The final attack, in which the Shuswap war-party almost completely exterminated the Sekanai, who had taken up their abode on Shuswap grounds, took place probably about 1790. Sir Alexander Mackenzie mentions seeing, in 1793, a Sekanai woman and man, evidently slaves, among the Soda Creek Shuswap at that time."

Within the Robson Valley region, there are eight traditional First Nations groups: Lheidli T’enneh First Nation, Simpcw First Nation, Lhtako Dene Nation, Canim Lake Indian Band, Xat’súll First Nation (Soda Creek), Shuswap First Nation, Okanagan First Nation, Tsilhqotʼin.

== Railways ==
The railways served as part of the foundation of the Robson Valley. When the railways were built, two divisional points existed, one at Lucerne and the other at McBride, or Mile 90 as it was called. The railways that went through the Robson Valley were the Grand Trunk Pacific and Canadian Northern Railway, which later merged, between 1918 and 1923, into the Canadian National Railway.
