= Prince George (ship) =

Several vessels have been named Prince George:

== Sailing ships ==
- Prince George (1750 EIC ship) was launched at Deptford. She made four voyages for the British East India Company (EIC) before she was sold in 1762 for breaking up.
- Prince George (1789 ship) was launched on the River Thames as a West Indiaman. She was a transport for the British 1795–1796 expedition to the Caribbean. She later traded between Scotland and Russia, and Scotland and Quebec. She was last listed in 1857, for a nominal service life of 68 years.
- Prince George (1806 ship) was launched in 1806 at Rotherhithe. She began her 48-year career as a West Indiaman. The French captured and released her in December 1814, to carry captured British sailors back to Britain. She then again sailed as a West Indiaman. Towards the end of the 1820s she started sailing to New South Wales. In 1834 she made a voyage under charter to the Hudson's Bay Company. Thereafter she traded between London and Quebec. In 1842 she brought 262 immigrants from England to Quebec. She was last listed in 1854.
- Prince George (1828 ship) was built at Newcastle upon Tyne. She was an East Indiaman, initially sailing under a license from the British East India Company (EIC). She made two voyages to South Australia, carrying 200 Prussian immigrants on the first. She was wrecked in July 1841 near Hong Kong.
- Prince George (1830 ship) was launched in 1830 at Bristol. In 1837 she made one voyage transporting convicts to New South Wales, and one the next year transporting settlers to South Australia. She was last listed in 1847.

== Steam ships ==
- SS Prince George (1910) was a Grand Trunk steamship launched in 1910. She and her sister ship SS Prince Rupert, provided passenger service along the coasts of British Columbia and Alaska until 1945. Prince George saw brief service as a hospital ship for the Royal Canadian Navy during World War I. In 1945 the ship caught fire in the harbour of Ketchikan, Alaska. The burned hulk was beached on Gravina Island where it remained for the next few years until it was towed to Seattle, Washington and broken up for scrap.
- SS Prince George (1947) was a passenger ship built for the Canadian National Steamship Company, to ply the route from Vancouver, British Columbia, to Southeast Alaska. In September 1950, Prince George collided with the Canadian Pacific coastal liner SS Princess Kathleen. The ship was sold in 1976 for use as a floating restaurant, and passed through the hands of several different owners. In October 1995 she caught fire at Britannia Beach, BC, and was subsequently sold for scrap.

== See also ==
- HMS Prince George – any of four vessels of the British Royal Navy
- Prince George (disambiguation)
