= Canadian Pacific Railway Coast Service =

Division of Canadian Pacific Railway

Logo of Canadian Pacific's British Columbia Coast Steamships

The Canadian Pacific Railway Coast Service, also known as the British Columbia Coast Steamships (BCCS), was a division of Canadian Pacific Railway (CPR), which began operating Pacific coastal shipping routes in the late 19th century. The development of coastal passenger and cargo shipping routes extended from British Columbia to Alaska and to Seattle, Washington in the United States.

== CPR overview ==
In 1884, CPR began purchasing sailing ships as part of a railway supply service on the Great Lakes. Over time, CPR became a railroad company with widely organized water transportation auxiliaries including the Canadian Pacific Railway Upper Lake Service (Great Lakes), the trans-Pacific service, the British Columbia Coast Service, the British Columbia Lake and River Service, the trans-Atlantic service, and the Ferry service. In the 20th century, the company evolved into a transcontinental railroad which operated two transoceanic services which connected Canada with Europe and with Asia. The range of CPR services were aspects of an integrated plan.

In 1901, CPR purchased the Canadian Pacific Navigation Company and began to expand its fleet, its routes, its infrastructure and its integrated rail service and trans-Pacific connections.

Many of CPR's coastal ships came to be called "pocket liners" because they offered amenities like a great ocean liner, but on a smaller scale. The names of these vessels began with the title "Princess"; and the Princess fleet developed as an eponym in the first half of the 20th century.

In 1913, 10 of the 12 Princess ships in the coastal fleet had been built to the orders of James William Troup, who was superintendent of CPR's Pacific coastal division. Troup's leadership marked the growth of BCCS until his retirement in 1928.

== Maritime incidents ==
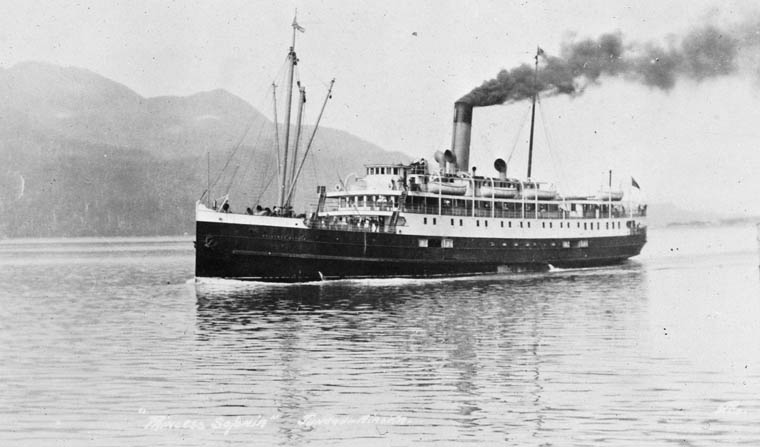
SS Princess Sophia, circa 1912

During the company's tenure, several maritime incidents took place. Notable amongst them were:

- In 1918 SS Princess Sophia sank after grounding on Vanderbilt Reef in Lynn Canal near Juneau, Alaska. 343 passengers and crew were lost with the ship. It is the worst maritime disaster in British Columbia and Alaskan history.
- In 1942 SS Princess Marguerite was sunk by U-83 with over 1,000 troops on board. Swift action from its escorts allowed the rescue of most persons on board. 55 crew were lost with the ship.
- In 1952 SS Princess Kathleen ran aground and sank in Lynn Canal, Alaska. All crew and passengers were rescued by the United States Coast Guard.

== Princess fleet ==
The Princess fleet was an eponym for the coastal vessels of the Canadian Pacific Coast Services. The names of these small ocean liners began with the title "Princess."

The ships of the British Columbia Coast Steamships came to be called "pocket liners" because they offered amenities like a great ocean liner, but on a smaller scale. The CPR princesses were a coastal counterpart to CPR's "Empress" fleet of passenger liners which sailed on trans-Pacific and trans-Atlantic routes.

James William Troup is credited with conceiving and building the Princess fleet. In 1913, 10 of the 12 Princess ships in the coastal fleet had been built to the orders of Capt. Troup.

PRINCESSES OF THE CANADIAN PACIFIC STEAMSHIP FLEET
Active Service	Vessel Name	Launch Date	Maiden Voyage	Other Names	Notes	Loss / Decommission Date
Canadian Pacific Railway (1884–1915)
1869	Princess Louise	1869	1869	Olympia (1869–79)		1906
1888	Princess May	1888	1888	SS Arthur, 1888–1896; SS Cass, 1896; SS Ninghchow, 1896–1899; SS Hating, 1899–1901		1935
1902	SS Princess Patricia I	1902	1902	SS Queen Alexandra, 1902–1912		1937
1903	Princess Beatrice	1903	1903			1929
1903	SS Princess Victoria	1902	1903	Tahsis No. 3, 1951-1953	converted oil carrier	1953
1907	SS Princess Ena	1907	1907			1936
1907	Princess Royal	1907	1907			1933
1908	SS Princess Charlotte			SS Mediterranean, 1950–1965		1965
1910	SS Princess Adelaide	1910	1910	SS Angelika, 1949–1967		1967
1910	SS Princess Mary	1910	1910			1954
1911	SS Princess Alice	1911	1911	SS Aegaeon, 1949–1966	Pacific coast, 1911–1949; Mediterranean, 1949–1966	1966
1912	SS Princess Sophia	1911	1912		Pacific coast, 1912–1918	1918
1913	SS Princess Maquinna	1912	1913			1962
1913	SS Island Princess	1913	1913	SS Daily 1913–1918, SS Cy Peck, 1930–1986		1986
1914	SS Princess Margaret	1914	1914			1929
1915	SS Princess Irene	1914	1915		converted minesweeper, blew up Sheerness 27.5.15	1915
Canadian Pacific Steamships Ocean Services Ltd. (1915–1971)
1921	SS Princess Louise	1921	1921		U.S. Largest Floating Restaurant, Los Angeles Harbor 1966	1990
1923	MV Motor Princess	1923	1923	MV Pender Queen, 1961–1980	sold as a hotel at Saltspring Island, BC in 1981
1925	SS Princess Kathleen	1924	1925		Pacific coast, 1925–1939; war years, 1939–1947; Pacific coast, 1947–1952	1952
1925	SS Princess Marguerite I	1924	1925			1942
1928	SS Princess Elaine	1927	1928		floating restaurant, Seattle 1963-71	1976
1928	Princess Norah	1928	1928	SS Queen of the North, 1955–1958; SS Canadian Prince, 1958–1964		1964
1930	SS Princess Elizabeth	1930	1930	SS Pegasus, 1961–1973; SS Highland Queen, 1973–1976		1976
1930	SS Princess Helene	1930	1930	SS Helene, 1963–1965; SS Carina II, 1965–1967; SS Carina, 1967–1977	Bay of Fundy, 1930–1963	1977
1930	SS Princess Joan	1930	1930	SS Hermes, 1961–1974		1974
1944	SS Trailer Princess	1944	1944	SS Coronis, 1944–1966
1945	SS Princess of Alberni	1945	1945	SS Pomare, 1948–1953; SS Nootka Prince', 1958-1959; SS Ocean Crown, 1959-1985		1985
1946	SS Yukon Princess	1945	1946	SS West Princess, 1959; SS Rosita, 1959-1964		1964
1949	TEV Princess Marguerite II	1948	1949			1996
1949	TEV Princess Patricia II	1948	1949			1989
1950	SS Princess of Nanaimo	1950	1951	SS Princess of Acadia, 1963-1971; MV Princess of Nanaimo, 1971-73; SS Henry Osborne, 1973-1974	Pacific coast, 1949-1963; Bay of Fundy, 1963-1971	1974
1955	MV Princess of Vancouver	1955	1955	MV Vancouver Island Princess, 1987-1993; MV Nan Hai Ming Zhu, 1991-2001; MV Pearl of South China Sea, 2001-	Pacific coast, 1955-1990
1971	MV Princess of Acadia	1971	1971		Bay of Fundy, 1971-

Former ferries of CP Steamships that were absorbed by Washington Marine Group (WMG) in 1998. Two years before WMG had gained full control of Seaspan.

Trailer and rail ferries
Active Service	Vessel Name	Launch Date	Maiden Voyage	Notes	Current Status
1973	Carrier Princess			Seaspan uses the same name after 1998.	Still in service for Seaspan.
1974	Princess Superior			Originally named the Incan Superior when built. Renamed Princess Superior in 1993 for Coastal Marine Operations, Seaspan uses the same name after 1998.	Still in service for Seaspan.

== See also ==
- Canadian Pacific Steamship Company, CPR's transatlantic and transpacific services.
- Canadian Pacific Railway Upper Lake Service
- Canadian Pacific Railway Lake and River Service
