= Princess May =

Princess May may refer to:

- Princess May, Duchess of York
- Princess May of Teck
- Princess May (steamship)
