= SS Prince Rupert =

Canadian steamship

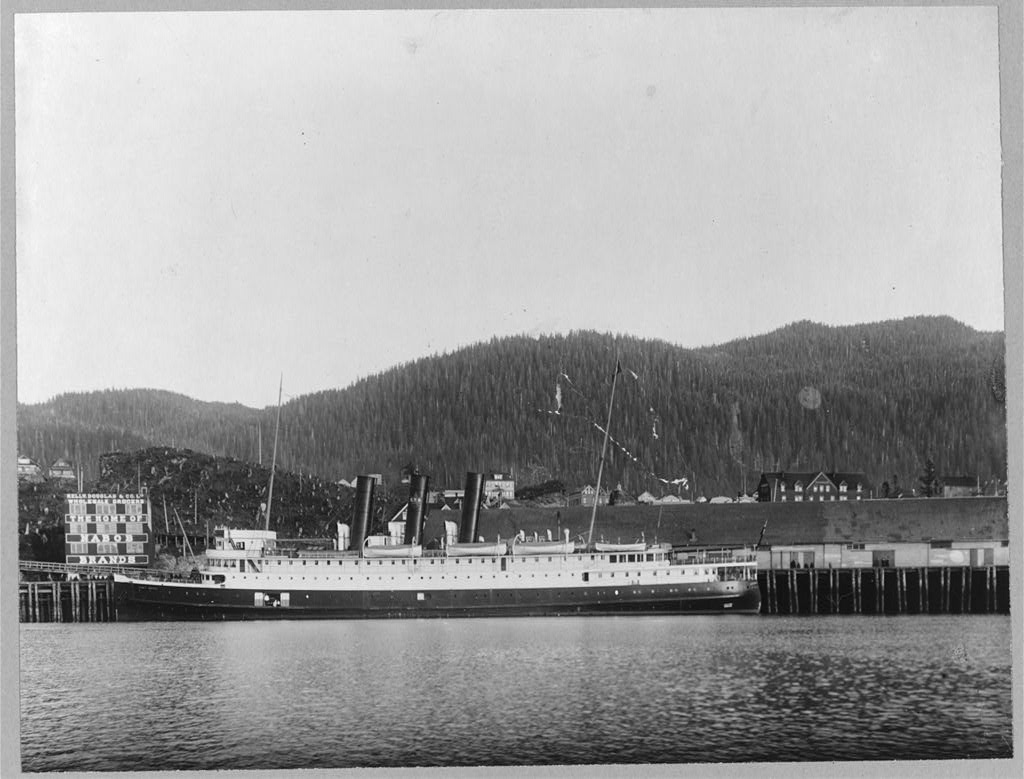
- The Grand Trunk Pacific steamship Prince Rupert

History
- Name: Prince Rupert
- Owner: Grand Trunk Pacific Steamship Company (1910–1925); Canadian National Steamship Company (1925–1956)
- Port of registry: (Canada) Prince Rupert, British Columbia
- Builder: Swan Hunter, Wallsend-on-Tyne
- Launched: 13 December 1909
- Completed: March 1910
- In service: 4 June 1910
- Out of service: 1955
- Fate: Scrapped 1956

General characteristics
- Type: Passenger ship
- Tonnage: 3,380 GRT; 1,626 NRT
- Length: 307 ft (93.6 m) pp.
- Beam: 42 ft (12.8 m)
- Draught: 24 ft (7.3 m)
- Propulsion: 2 × triple expansion steam engines; 2 screws, 6,500 ihp (4,800 kW)
- Speed: 18 knots (33 km/h; 21 mph)
- Capacity: 1,756

The Grand Trunk steamship Prince Rupert and her sister ship SS Prince George served the coast of British Columbia and Alaska. Prince Rupert had a 45-year career serving northern ports from Vancouver, British Columbia, from 1910 to 1955. The ship was considered "unlucky" and suffered several incidents during her career, including two significant ones that left large portions of the vessel underwater. The ship was broken up in 1956.

== Design and description ==
Prince Rupert was 307 feet (93.6 m) long with a beam of 42 feet (12.8 m) and a draught of 24 feet (7.3 m). The vessel had a tonnage of 3,380 gross register tons (GRT) and 1,626 net register tons (NRT). The ship was powered by steam provided by two double-ended and two single-ended boilers operating at 180 psi (1,200 kPa). This powered two four-cylinder triple expansion engines creating driving two screws creating 6,500 indicated horsepower (4,800 kW). This gave Prince Rupert a maximum speed of 18 knots (33 km/h; 21 mph). The vessel burned coal for fuel initially, converting to oil in 1912. The passenger ship had large bilge keels to reduce rolling in heavy seas. The ship had two masts and three funnels.

The passenger ship had a passenger capacity of 1,756; 220 first class, 36 second class and 1,500 excursionists on the promenade deck. In 1916, Prince Rupert was given limited staterooms for second-class travellers. Six four-berth and one two-berth staterooms were installed. Prince Rupert also had a refrigerated freight capacity of 350 tons.

== Service history ==
Prince Rupert was ordered from Swan Hunter & Wigham Richardson and was constructed at their shipyard at Wallsend-on-Tyne. The passenger ship was launched on 13 December 1909 and completed in March 1910. (Note: Guay states the ship's launch date as 19 December 1909.) Upon arrival on the West Coast of Canada, Prince Rupert was used for express service between Vancouver, Victoria, Prince Rupert, Stewart, Anyox, the Queen Charlotte Islands and Seattle. The ship arrived at her namesake town for the first time on 15 June 1910. In 1912, Prince Rupert underwent conversion from coal-burning to oil-burning fuel, which was performed by the B.C. Marine Railway Company at Esquimalt, British Columbia.

Beginning in 1916, Prince Rupert began her career as an "unlucky ship". On 28 December 1916, the vessel collided with the tugboat Cleeve in Vancouver Harbour. The following year on 23 March, the ship ran aground on Genn Island while leaving Anyox during a gale. Prince Rupert was eventually lifted off the rocks and spent two months in dry dock at Prince Rupert undergoing repairs.

On 1 May 1918, the ship's screws were stripped and Prince Rupert was forced to dock at Victoria for repairs. On 14 January 1919 she was struck by lightning in Vancouver Harbour. In October that year, the ship suffered a fire in her cargo hold, and underwent $25,000 in repairs. On 20 September 1920, the vessel struck a reef in Swanson Bay and tore a 12-foot (3.7 m) hole in the bottom of the hull. Prince Rupert was beached and the passengers and crew landed. However, at high tide, the ship became completely submerged except for sections of the bridge and upper deck.

The ship was salvaged by the Pacific Salvage Company of Vancouver. Prince Rupert's stern lay under 72 feet (22 m) of water and 20 feet (6.1 m), which took the salvage vessel Algerine and two 1,400-ton barges to even out. A cofferdam was then constructed on the ship until the structure was 75 feet (23 m) high, 175 feet (53 m) long and 42 feet (13 m) across. The entire cofferdam took 125,000 feet (38,000 m) of lumber, which was bolted to the sides of the ship with the crevices patched with heavy canvas. The structure added a further 200 tons to the vessel. Prince Rupert was then raised to the surface and towed to Victoria where the ship underwent repairs at Yarrows, remaining out of service until May 1921. From 1925, ownership of both Prince Rupert and Prince George was transferred along with the Grand Trunk Pacific Railway system to the Government of Canada to be operated as part of the Canadian National Railway.

On 22 August 1927, Prince Rupert went aground on Ripple Rock. Captain Andy Johnson of the competing Union Steamship Company of British Columbia manoeuvred his ship Cardena alongside and pulled Prince Rupert off the reef, saving the vessel from almost certain disaster. Cardena towed Prince Rupert into Deep Cove where Cardena and Princess Beatrice removed passengers, baggage and cargo. Prince Rupert was then towed by two tugboats to Vancouver, where the ship was repaired by Burrard Dry Dock. (Note: Guay states the ship was towed to Prince Rupert.)

On 6 March 1931, the ship was alongside at Yarrows in Victoria undergoing a yearly refit when water, leaking into the hold, caused the vessel to keel over at a 45° angle and sink in 26 feet (7.9 m) of water. To prevent further rolling, the ship was fastened to the dock by its masts. Prince Rupert was raised once again and following a month-long refit, was ready for service again.

On 4 September 1935, she overtook and rammed the American 28-gross register ton halibut-fishing vessel Anna J near Maud Island (from where Ripple Rock was blasted in Seymour Narrows) on the British Columbia coast; Anna J beached herself in Plumper Bay after the collision and became a total loss.

Prince Rupert went aground on Prolewy Rocks just north of Wrangell Narrows on 1 October 1943. She tore two holes in her starboard side, but was able to reach Petersburg and moor. Her list reached 20 degrees, but the 116 passengers and two-thirds of her crew were safely disembarked. USCGC Hemlock was dispatched to the scene. She provided pumps, manpower, towing, and fire fighting which eventually allowed Prince Rupert to proceed to permanent repairs.

On 20 August 1951, Prince Rupert rammed the cruise liner Princess Kathleen north of Prince Rupert. Prince Rupert cut a 28-foot (8.5 m) v-shaped hole in the port bow of Princess Kathleen, cutting halfway through the main deck. Princess Kathleen suffered $250,000 in damage and Prince Rupert, $100,000. Both ships were deemed at fault by the Admiralty. Prince Rupert was taken out of service in April 1955. The ship was sold for scrap in 1956. Purchased by Rinko Iron Works, a Japanese salvage company, the ship was renamed SS Prince Maru. The vessel was then taken to Osaka, Japan, and broken up in August 1956.

== See also ==
- List of ships in British Columbia

== Sources ==
- Guay, David R. P. (2016). Passenger and Merchant Ships of the Grand Trunk Pacific and Canadian Northern Railways. Toronto: Dundurn Press. ISBN 978-1-4597-3555-2.
- Hacking, Norman (1995). Prince Ships of Northern BC: Ships of the Grand Trunk Pacific and Canadian Northern Railways. Surrey, British Columbia: Heritage House Publishing Company. ISBN 1-895811-28-7.
- "Prince Rupert (1129743)". Miramar Ship Index.
