= George of the United Kingdom =

George of the United Kingdom may refer to the following monarchs of Great Britain and later the United Kingdom:

- George I of Great Britain (1660–1727), King of Great Britain from 1714
- George II of Great Britain (1683–1760), King of Great Britain from 1727, son of George I
- George III (1738–1820), King of Great Britain and later the United Kingdom from 1760, grandson of George II
- George IV (1762–1830), King of the United Kingdom from 1820, son of George III
- George V (1865–1936), King of the United Kingdom from 1910, great-great-grandson of George III
- George VI (1895–1952), King of the United Kingdom from 1936, son of George V

== See also ==
- King George (disambiguation)
- Prince George (disambiguation)
