= SS Princess Kathleen =

Coordinates: 58°23′42.7″N 134°46′45.4″W

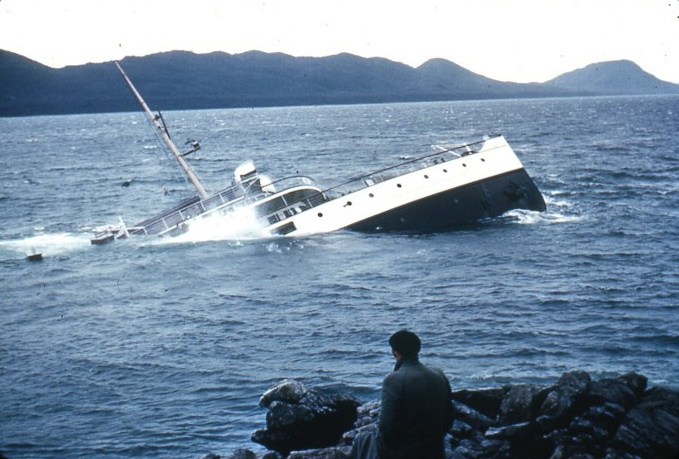
- The sinking of SS Princess Kathleen, September 7, 1952

History

Canada
- Name: Princess Kathleen
- Owner: Canadian Pacific Steamships
- Builder: John Brown & Co., Clydebank
- Launched: September 1924
- Fate: Ran aground and sank at Lena Point in Lynn Canal, Alaska, on September 7, 1952. 58°23'39.2"N 134°46'51.6"W

General characteristics
- Tonnage: 5,875 t (5,782 long tons)
- Length: 369 ft (112 m)
- Beam: 60 ft (18 m)
- Propulsion: Steam
- Speed: 22.5 knots (41.7 km/h; 25.9 mph)

SS Princess Kathleen was a passenger and freight steamship owned and operated by Canadian Pacific Steamships. She served the coastal communities of British Columbia, Alaska and Washington.

The Princess Kathleen, along with the Princess Marguerite, was built to replace the Princess Irene and Princess Margaret, which had been requisitioned by the British Admiralty during World War I.

Princess Kathleen was built by John Brown & Company, Clydebank and launched in 1924. She sailed from Glasgow to Vancouver via the Panama Canal on her maiden voyage in 1925. The Princess Kathleen and Princess Marguerite relieved the Princess Charlotte and Princess Victoria on the "triangle service" between Vancouver, Victoria and Seattle, for which she was built. With a capacity of 1,500 passengers, 290 berths, 136 staterooms, a 168-seat dining room and the ability to carry 30 automobiles, the Princess Kathleen and Princess Marguerite quickly became the preferred ships on this service, successfully competing against the Black Ball Line. Both ships were later modified to carry 1,800 passengers by reducing the number of staterooms to 123.

King George VI and Queen Elizabeth travelled aboard Princess Kathleen en route to Victoria in 1939.

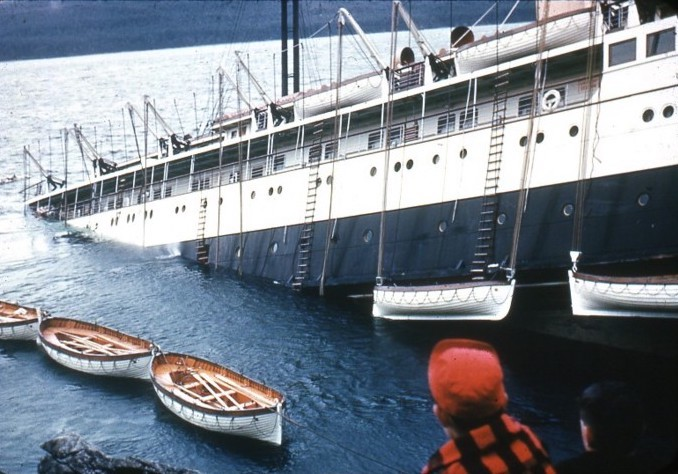
Another photograph of the sinking

In September 1939 Princess Kathleen and Princess Marguerite were requisitioned by the Royal Canadian Navy for use as troop ships. Princess Marguerite was lost in action, but Princess Kathleen was returned to Canadian Pacific in 1947 and resumed service on the triangle service. Changing demands and increased automobile traffic saw Canadian Pacific transfer her in 1949 to the Vancouver–Alaska cruise service along the Inside Passage.

It was during this assignment at 03:00 local time on September 7, 1952, that Princess Kathleen ran aground at Lena Point in Alaska's Lynn Canal at low tide; it was later determined that radar was not operational at the time of the grounding. The United States Coast Guard was alerted two hours later and a rescue cutter arrived at 06:30. The crew tried to reverse off Lena Point; however, as the tide rose, her stern became swamped. All passengers and crew were transferred to lifeboats and ashore as she slid into deeper water and then sank stern first.

The wreck of Princess Kathleen sits in approximately 50–100 ft (15–30 m) of water and is accessible to divers; however, tides and currents in the vicinity of Lena Point are strong. In 2010, when it was determined that there was a significant threat of a large leak, a salvage operation recovered 130,000 US gal (490,000 L) of petroleum products from the wreck.

== See also ==
- Princess fleet
