= Prince George =

Prince George may refer to:

== People ==
=== British princes ===
- George Plantagenet, Duke of Clarence (1449–1478), middle brother of Edward IV and Richard III.
- Prince George Augustus, later George II of Great Britain (1683–1760)
- Prince George William of Great Britain (1717–1718), son of George II
- Prince George William Frederick, later George III of the United Kingdom (1738–1820)
- Prince George Augustus Frederick, later George IV of the United Kingdom (1762–1830)
- Prince George, Duke of Cambridge (1819–1904), grandson of George III
- Prince George of Cumberland, later George V of Hanover (1819–1878), grandson of George III
- Prince George Frederick Ernest Albert, later George V of the United Kingdom (1865–1936)
- Prince George, Duke of Kent (1902–1942), fourth son of George V
- Prince George of Wales (born 2013), first son of William, Prince of Wales and second in line to the British throne

==== Fictional ====
- George (Blackadder), a fictional caricature of George IV while he was Prince Regent

=== Other princes ===
- George Kastrioti Skanderbeg (1405–1468), Albanian prince and national hero
- George, Duke of Coimbra (1481–1550), Portuguese Infante, natural son of King John II of Portugal
- George of Lencastre, 2nd Duke of Aveiro (1548–1578), Portuguese Prince
- Prince George of Kakheti (died 1561)
- George of Lencastre, 1st Duke of Torres Novas (1594–1632), Portuguese Prince
- Prince George of Kakheti (died 1605)
- Prince Georg Friedrich of Waldeck (1620–1692)
- Prince George of Denmark (1653–1708), husband of Anne of Great Britain
- Prince George of Hesse-Darmstadt (1669–1705)
- Prince Georg Ludwig of Holstein-Gottorp (1719–1763)
- Prince George William of Hesse-Darmstadt (1722–1782)
- Prince George Charles of Hesse-Darmstadt (1754–1830)
- Prince George of Imereti (1778–1807)
- Prince George Bernhard of Anhalt-Dessau (1796–1865)
- Prince George of Prussia (1826–1902)
- George Albert, Prince of Schwarzburg-Rudolstadt (1838–1890)
- Prince George of Greece and Denmark (1869–1957)
- Prince George Alexandrovich Yuryevsky (1872–1913)
- George William, Hereditary Prince of Hanover (1880–1912)
- Prince Georg of Bavaria (1880–1943)
- George, Crown Prince of Serbia (1887–1972)
- George Mountbatten, 2nd Marquess of Milford Haven (1892–1938), born Prince George of Battenberg
- Prince Georgy Konstantinovich of Russia (1903–1938)
- Prince George William of Hanover (1915–2006)
- Prince Georg of Denmark (1920–1986)
- Georg Friedrich Prinz von Preussen (born 1976)
- Giorgi Bagration Bagrationi (born 2011), Georgian prince

== Places ==
=== Canada ===
- Prince George, British Columbia, largest city in northern British Columbia
  - Prince George-Mount Robson, a provincial electoral district in British Columbia
  - Prince George North, a provincial electoral district in British Columbia
  - Prince George–Omineca, a provincial electoral district in British Columbia

=== South Africa ===
- Prince George Circuit, motorsport circuit in East London

=== United States ===
- Prince George's County, Maryland
- Prince George County, Virginia
  - Prince George, Virginia, a census-designated place
- Hyattsville Crossing station, formerly Prince George's Plaza station, station on the Washington Metro in Hyattsville, Maryland

== Ships ==
- HMS Prince George, four Royal Navy ships
- SS Prince George, sister ship of SS Prince Rupert
- SS Prince George (1947), successor to SS Prince George, launched in 1947.
- Prince George (ship), a 19th-century barque
- Prince George (HBC vessel), operated by the Hudson's Bay Company from 1834 to 1837, see Hudson's Bay Company vessels

== Other ==
- Mr. PG, a mascot and monument located in Prince George, British Columbia
- Prince George (racehorse), favourite for the 1849 Grand National
