= SS Princess Royal =

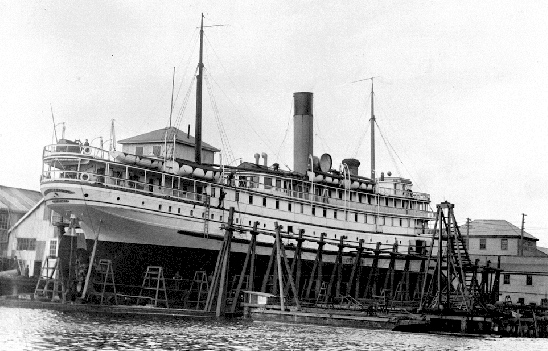
- Princess Royal on shipways at Victoria Machinery Depot circa 1910.

History
- Name: Princess Royal
- Owner: Canadian Pacific Railway Coast Service
- Route: coastal British Columbia, Puget Sound
- Builder: B.C. Marine Railway Co. Ltd., Esquimalt
- Completed: 1907
- Out of service: 1933
- Identification: Canada registry #121988
- Fate: Scrapped

General characteristics
- Class & type: coastal steamship
- Tonnage: 1997 gross register tons
- Length: 228 ft (69 m)
- Beam: 40 ft (12 m)
- Depth: 17 ft (5 m) depth of hold
- Installed power: Triple-expansion steam engine
- Propulsion: single propeller
- Speed: 15 knots (28 km/h)

Princess Royal was a wooden steamship built in 1907 for the Canadian Pacific Railway Coast Service. The ship operated on the coasts of British Columbia, south east Alaska, and northern Puget Sound until 1933, when the ship was sold for scrapping.

== Design and construction ==
Princess Royal was ordered by James W. Troup, superintendent of the coastal steamship service of the Canadian Pacific Railway, and was intended to run on routes north of Vancouver along the coast of British Columbia and southeast Alaska.

Princess Royal was built in 1907 by the B.C. Marine Railway Company, Ltd., at Esquimalt, British Columbia. Princess Royal was the second ship built for the CPR Coast Service by B.C. Marine Railway Co. (The first was Princess Beatrice.) Princess Royal, like Princess Beatrice, was built of wood. The ship's dimensions were 228 feet (69 m) long, 40-foot (12 m) beam, 17-foot (5.2 m) depth of hold, and 1997 gross tons. The ship had a single propeller. The power plant had a single triple-expansion steam engine, with cylinder diameters, from high to low steam pressure, of 22, 35 and 60 inches (1,500 mm). Bore stroke on all cylinders was 36 inches (910 mm). This power plant, manufactured by Bow, McLachlan and Co. of Paisley, Scotland generated 1600 horsepower. The ship's speed maximum speed was 15 kn (28 km/h). Princess Royal had 72 staterooms with 144 berths. The ship's Canadian registration number was 121988.

Princess Royal was launched on September 2, 1906. At the time the ship was launched, it was anticipated that it would not be ready for service until the following summer.

== Operations ==
Princess Royal began its first Alaska trip from Victoria, British Columbia on July 18, 1907, under the command of Captain W.O. Hughes. 120 passengers were carried north, with 136 embarking for the southbound trip. Captain Troup himself was on board for the trip. The plan was to provide a weekly Alaska service, with the Princess Royal running in alternate weeks with the Princess May. Princess Royal was run on this route for a while, then transferred to the Victoria-Seattle route. It was on the Seattle route that Princess Royal became involved in the 1908 rate war between the CPR and the Puget Sound Navigation Company. Fares on the steamers on the route fell well below costs, to as low as 25 cents.

The ship was also operated on route from Victoria to Vancouver, British Columbia.

Originally Princess Royal was painted light gray and white. By 1913, the color scheme had changed to a black hull and white upper works.

In 1928 Princess Royal was converted to oil fuel. To better transport automobiles, the overhead clearance was increased from 5 feet 6 inches (1.68 m) to 6 feet (1.8 m) four inches (102 mm) .

== Disposition ==
In 1933 Princess Royal was sold to Capital Iron and Metals Co. of Victoria to be scrapped. After all metal salvage was removed, in August 1934 the hulk was deliberately burned off Albert Head near Victoria.

== See also ==
- Royal eponyms in Canada
