= SS Princess Louise (1921) =

History
- Name: SS Princess Louise
- Owner: Hudson's Bay Company; Canadian Pacific Railway, others.
- Route: Vancouver, British Columbia; Puget Sound; coastal British Columbia; southeast Alaska
- Builder: Wallace Shipyard, North Vancouver, British Columbia
- Launched: 29 August 1921
- In service: 1921
- Out of service: 1964 (restaurant until 1989)
- Fate: Sunk 20 June 1990
- Notes: Artificial reef at 900'

General characteristics
- Class & type: Pocket Liner
- Tonnage: 4032 gross tons.
- Length: 317.2 ft (97 m)
- Beam: 48.1 ft (15 m)
- Draught: 34.6 ft (11 m)
- Installed power: Single reciprocating, triple expansion steam engine
- Propulsion: 4,500 horsepower
- Capacity: 1,000 day passengers, or 236 overnight passengers in 133 staterooms

The SS Princess Louise was a 331-foot steamship, named in honor of Louise, Princess Royal and Duchess of Fife, Queen Victoria's granddaughter. The ship was part of the Canadian Pacific Railway's "Princess" fleet, the coastal counterparts to CPR's "Empress" fleet of passenger liners which sailed on trans-Pacific and trans-Atlantic routes. The ships of the British Columbia Coast Steamships came to be called "pocket liners" because they offered on smaller vessels the superior class of service, splendid amenities and luxurious decor equal to great ocean liners.

== Design and construction ==
Princess Louise was built in 1921, North Vancouver, B.C., for the tourist service to Alaska run by British Columbia Coast Steamships (BCCS). She was considered to be a luxury cruise ship of the era.

== Operations ==
For BCCS, Princess Louise carried passengers on the 1,750-mile round-trip voyage between Vancouver and Alaska until she was removed from service in 1964.

== Transfer of ownership ==
Purchased by Jerry Sutton, Princess Louise was moved to a permanent berth on Terminal Island in Los Angeles Harbor. She opened for business on September 25, 1966, as the largest floating restaurant in America, and was initially successful, drawing in nearly 2,000 guests per day. The ship was used for an episode of the U.S. television show, “Mannix,” Season 6, Episode 14, “Light and Shadow,” which premiered December 16, 1972. In 1979, she was towed to a new location at Berth 94 in San Pedro. By 1984, the restaurant was losing money, and was sold to Marion Perkov, who failed to save the business and filed for bankruptcy four years later.

The SS Princess Louise forever closed her restaurant doors on January 15, 1989. The Bank of San Pedro seized the vessel, and had her repaired and made ready for resale, when on October 30, 1989, the ship capsized at her berth. Lloyd's of London, the ship's insurers, suspected foul play, and refused to distribute the insured value to the beneficiaries.

== Fate ==
It was finally decided that Princess Louise would be sunk in 500 feet of water near Catalina Island as an artificial reef. However, while being towed toward Catalina on the morning of June 20, 1990, the ship took on water and sank prematurely in 900 feet of water.
