= HMS Angora =

Royal Navy ship

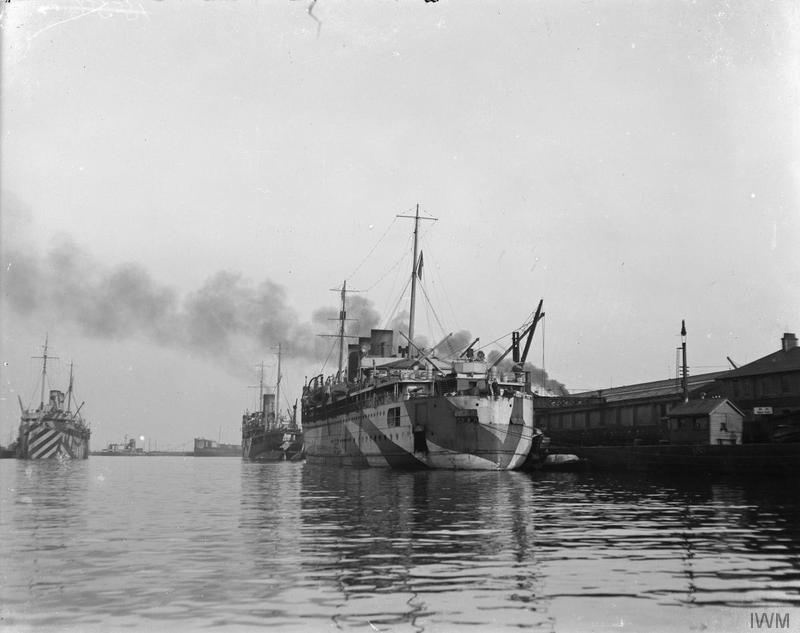
- HMS Angora (foreground) loading mines at Grangemouth

History

United Kingdom
- Name: HMS Angora
- Ordered: 5 January 1910
- Builder: Wm Denny & Bros.
- Launched: 1 December 1910
- Commissioned: September 1914
- Decommissioned: 15 November 1919
- Fate: Broken up on 30 July 1937

General characteristics
- Type: Auxiliary minelayer
- Armament: 4 x 4.7in single; 2 x 6pdr AA

HMS Angora was a British passenger ship which was requisitioned from the Mercantile Marine by the Royal Navy for service as a transport and auxiliary minelayer during World War I.

== Description ==
Angora had a tonnage of 4,288 tons and a maximum speed of 17 knots. While in mercantile service, her main deck was devoted to berthing and amenities for fifty first-class and fifty second-class passengers. Aside from the passengers, Angora was also capable of carrying small amounts of cargo such as mail, though the amount of cargo was limited to increase her speed.

As a minelayer, Angora was armed with three 4.7-inch guns and two 6-pounder anti-aircraft cannons. It could carry a total of 320 mines at a time.

== History ==
Angora was launched at Dumbarton by William Denny & Brothers on 1 December 1910 for the British India Steam Navigation Company. It served as a mail and passenger carrier on the Calcutta–Rangoon line beginning on 20 February 1911.

In September 1914, Angora was requisitioned by the Admiralty as a transport ship and carried 1,200 Gurkha soldiers from Mumbai to Marseille in overcrowded conditions. On 27 February 1915, the ship was commissioned as an auxiliary minelayer and deployed to the North Sea. Angora laid her first mines on 10 September 1915 along with HMS Orvieto and HMS Princess Margaret. The three minelayers, escorted by six destroyers and covered by various distant naval forces, successfully laid 1,450 mines off the Amrun bank. They were not hampered by German ships and finished the minefield overnight, returning to Britain by morning. The minefield they laid later sank the German light cruiser Graudenz on 21 April 1916.

On 15 November 1919, the ship was decommissioned, refitted, and returned to her previous owners. Angora promptly returned to her role as a passenger ship, carrying 103 passengers from London to Mumbai on 24 January 1920. She ran aground on 14 October 1920, but was refloated with only minor damage. In 1932, she was laid up at Calcutta. On 30 July 1937, she arrived in Japan and was broken up along with her sister ship Arankola after being sold for £42,500.
