= Sentinel Island Light =

Lighthouse in southeastern Alaska, US

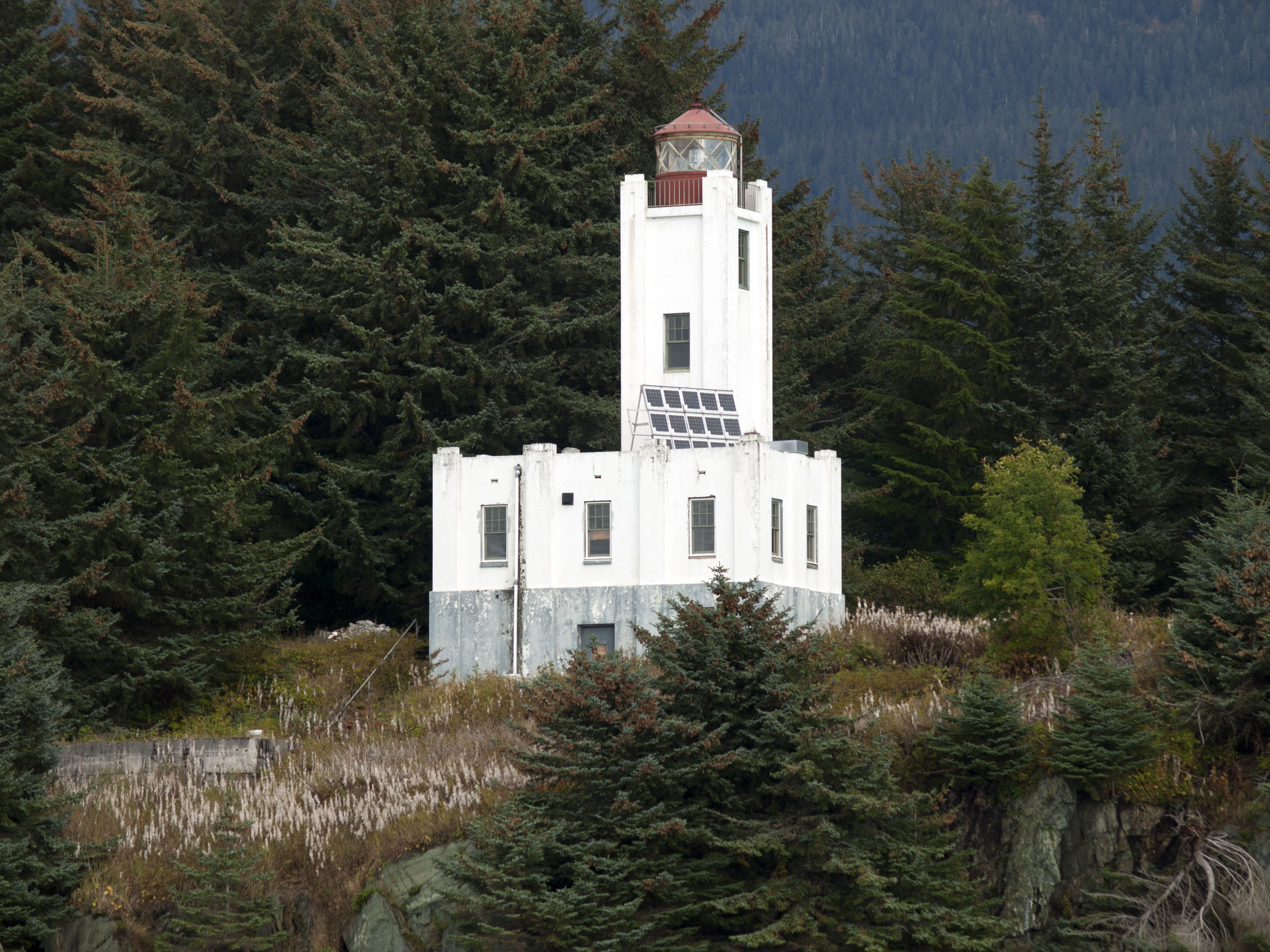
- Sentinel Island Light
- Location: Lynn Canal, Juneau City and Borough, Alaska, United States
- Coordinates: 58°32′46.5″N 134°55′23.6″W

Tower
- Constructed: 1902 (first)
- Foundation: concrete
- Construction: concrete tower
- Automated: 1966
- Height: 51 feet (16 m)
- Shape: square tower with lantern
- Markings: art deco architecture, white tower, red lantern
- Power source: solar power
- Operator: Gastineau Channel Historical Society
- Heritage: National Register of Historic Places listed place

Light
- First lit: 1935 (current)
- Focal height: 86 feet (26 m)
- Lens: Fourth order Fresnel lens
- Range: 14 nautical miles (26 km; 16 mi)
- Characteristic: Fl W 10s. obscured from 152° to 296°
- Sentinel Island Light Station
- U.S. National Register of Historic Places
- U.S. Historic district
- Alaska Heritage Resources Survey
- Nearest city: Juneau, Alaska
- Coordinates: 58°32′47″N 134°55′24″W
- Area: 6.6 acres (2.7 ha)
- Built: 1902
- Architectural style: Modern Movement, Art Deco, et al.
- MPS: Light Stations of the United States MPS
- NRHP reference No.: 02001407
- AHRS No.: JUN-00085
- Added to NRHP: December 2, 2002

The Sentinel Island Light is a lighthouse in Alaska adjacent to Lynn Canal.

== Location ==
The Sentinel Island Light is at the northern entrance to the Favorite Channel, between the mainland and Lincoln and Shelter Islands. It was listed on the National Register of Historic Places on December 2, 2002.

== History ==
On August 5, 1910, the steamship Princess May grounded on rocks just north of Sentinel Island. Although the ship was successfully taken off the rocks on September 5, 1910, photographic images showing the ship pointing in the air at low tide became famous.

The 1930s lighthouse, replacing an earlier wooden structure, was built for $35,310. It was listed on the National Register of Historic Places in 2002. Other than the lighthouse, the district included four other contributing buildings, four contributing structures, and two contributing sites.

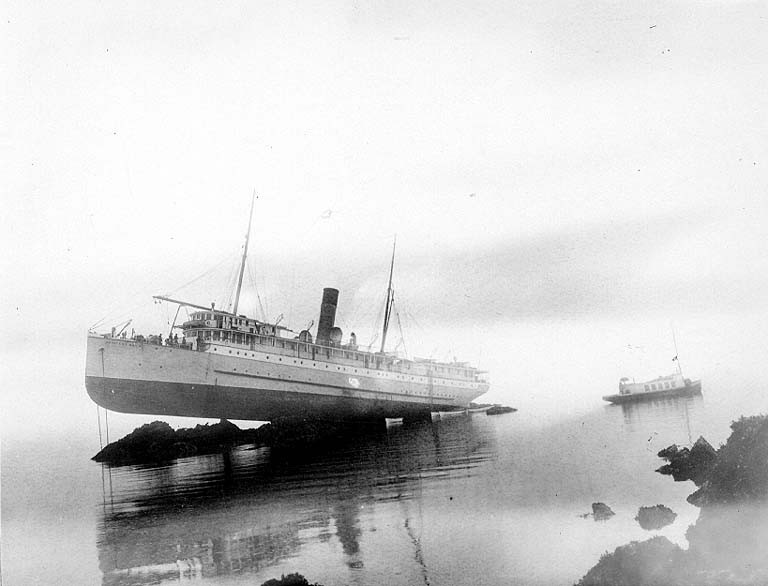
Princess May on the rocks, August 7, 1910

Princess May aground, as seen from Sentinel Island

== See also ==
- List of lighthouses in the United States
- National Register of Historic Places listings in Juneau, Alaska

== Sources ==
- Turner, Robert D., Pacific Princesses: An Illustrated History of Canadian Pacific Railway's Princess Fleet on the Northwest Coast, Sono Nis Press, Victoria, BC (1977) ISBN 0-919462-04-9
