= SS Princess Maquinna =

SS Princess Maquinna was a ship in the Princess fleet of the Canadian Pacific Railway Coast Service, serving the west coast of Vancouver Island. Named after a daughter of chief Maquinna, it was built in Victoria, British Columbia and launched in 1912, and made its maiden voyage in 1913. It broke down in 1952 and was converted to an ore carrier renamed Taku. It was decommissioned in 1962 and broken up.

== Sources ==
- "Heritage Column: Princess Maquinna was a lifeline for Ucluelet". Tofino-Ucluelet Westerly News. 27 August 2018.
