= HMS Princess Margaret =

British minelayer

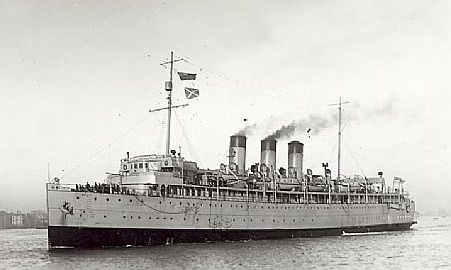

History

United Kingdom
- Name: HMS Princess Margaret
- Owner: Canadian Pacific Railway Coast Service
- Builder: William Denny, Dunbarton
- Launched: 24 June 1914
- Acquired: Chartered 26 December 1914
- Fate: Sold May 1929

General characteristics
- Tonnage: 5,934 GRT
- Length: 395 ft 6 in (120.55 m) oa
- Beam: 54 ft (16.46 m)
- Draught: 16 ft 10 in (5.13 m)
- Installed power: 15,000 shp (11,000 kW)
- Propulsion: Steam turbines; 2 shafts
- Speed: 22.5 kn (25.9 mph; 41.7 km/h)
- Complement: 225
- Armament: 2× 4.7-inch (120 mm) guns; 2 × 12-pounder (76 mm) guns; 2 × 6-pounder (57 mm) anti-aircraft guns; 1 × 2-pounder (40 mm) anti-aircraft gun; 500 mines

HMS Princess Margaret was a minelayer operated by the British Royal Navy during and after the First World War. She was built by the Scottish shipbuilder William Denny for the Canadian Pacific Railway Coast Service to serve on the Pacific West Coast, and as such was powered by geared steam turbines, giving a speed of 23 knots (43 km/h; 26 mph).

The outbreak of war caused her to be taken over by the Royal Navy and to be converted to a minelayer, carrying as many as 500 mines. She was widely used for minelaying in the North Sea and English Channel during the war, which she survived, having laid the most mines of any Royal Navy ship during the war. She remained in Royal Navy service following the end of the war, taking part in the British intervention in the Russian Civil War. She was sold for scrap in 1929.

== Construction and design ==
In 1914, two fast passenger ships, Princess Irene and Princess Margaret, were being built by the Scottish shipbuilder William Denny for the "Princess fleet" of the Canadian Pacific Railway Coast Service to use in its service between Vancouver and Seattle. Princess Margaret was launched at Denny's Dunbarton shipyard on 24 June 1914.

At the outbreak of the First World War, the Royal Navy's minelaying capability was limited to seven old Apollo class cruisers. These ships could carry 100–140 mines and although originally designed for a speed of 20 knots (23 mph; 37 km/h), by 1914 they were only capable of 15 knots (17 mph; 28 km/h).

To improve the minelaying capability of the Royal Navy, Princess Irene and Princess Margaret were requisitioned and converted to minelayers. They were 395 feet 6 inches (120.55 m) long overall with a beam of 54 feet (16.46 m) and a draught of 16 feet 9 inches (5.11 m). The ships had a gross register tonnage of 5934 t. Ten Babcock & Wilcox water-tube boilers fed steam at 202 pounds per square inch (1,390 kPa) to geared steam turbines driving two shafts. The machinery was rated at 15,000 shaft horsepower (11,000 kW) giving a speed of 22.5 knots (25.9 mph; 41.7 km/h). They had a crew of 225.

Armament consisted of two 4.7 in (120 mm) guns, two 12-pounder (76 mm) guns, two 6-pounder (57 mm) anti-aircraft guns and one 2-pounder pom-pom anti-aircraft autocannon. They could carry up to 500 mines.

== Service ==
=== World War I ===
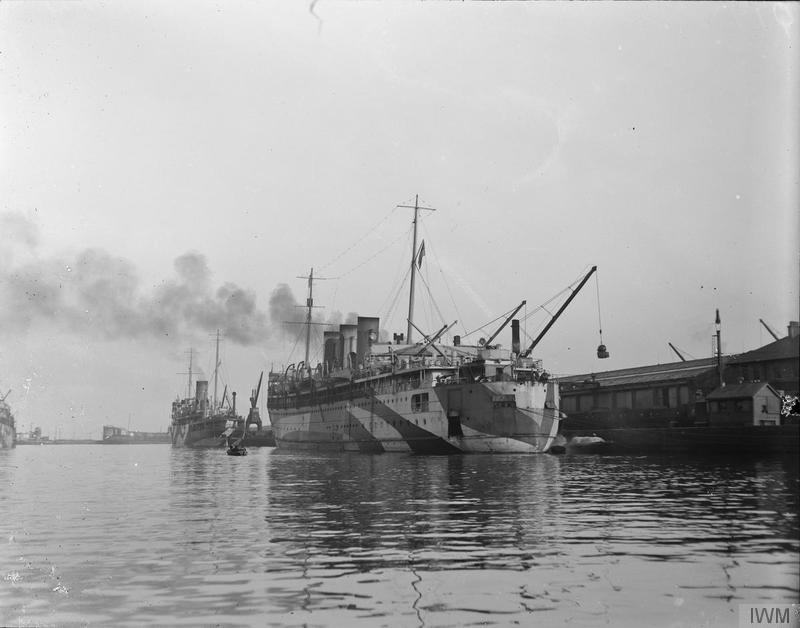
Princess Margaret loading mines at the Grangemouth minelaying base

Princess Margaret was commissioned on 26 December 1914. By March 1915, she was listed as being a member of the Minelaying Squadron. On 8 May 1915 Princess Margaret and Princess Irene laid a minefield northwest of Heligoland, with Princess Margaret laying 490 mines. On 16 August 1915, Princess Margaret, escorted by two divisions of the 10th Destroyer Flotilla, eight destroyers in total, was tasked with laying a minefield on the Amrum Bank. At about 8:45 pm five patrolling German destroyers encountered the British force near the Horns Reefs light vessel. The German destroyer B98 fired two torpedoes, one of which stuck the British destroyer Mentor. Princess Margaret turned away to avoid the attack, with the rest of the British destroyers (most of which had not spotted the German ships and thought that Mentor had struck a mine) following. The German force also turned away, and Mentor, which had her bow blown off, was left by herself to make her way back to base. Despite the damage, Mentor made it safely back to Harwich. On 10 September 1915 Princess Margaret and the minelayers Angora and Orvieto set out from the Humber with a close escort of six destroyers and with heavy distant covering forces (including most of the rest of the Harwich Force and the Battle Cruiser Force out of Rosyth) on Operation CY, another attempt to lay a minefield off the Amrum Bank. This time the Germans did not interfere, and the three minelayers laid a total of 1,450 mines on the night of 10/11 September. The German light cruiser Graudenz struck a mine in this minefield on the night of 21/22 April 1916. On the night of 8/9 November 1915 Princess Margaret and Angora laid another field of 850 mines to replace the field laid in September, which had been discovered by the Germans. While the minefield was laid successfully, the destroyer Matchless, part of the covering force, struck a German mine on the return journey to Harwich.

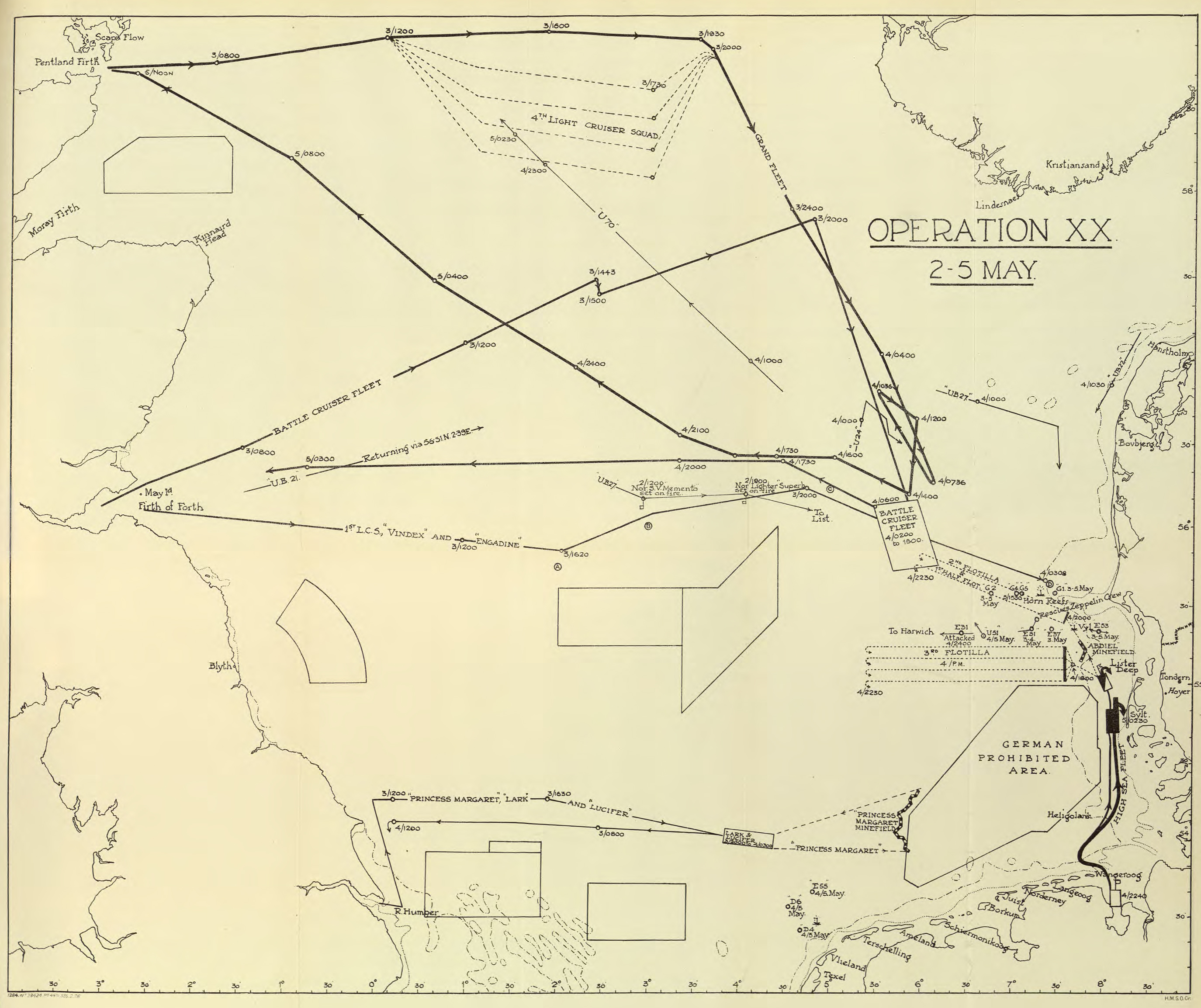
Operation XX

By March 1916, Princess Margaret was listed as flagship of the Minesweeping Squadron. On 20 March 1916, Princess Margaret, Orviedo, Paris and Biarritz laid mines in the North Sea approaches to the English Channel and Thames, between the North Hinder and Galloper light ships. On 24 April 1916, Princess Margaret, together with Biarritz, Orvieto and Paris, laid a large minefield off the Belgian coast, which was supplemented by mine-nets laid by trawlers, in order to constrain the activities of German submarines based in Flanders. On 3–4 May 1916, the British launched Operation XX, an attempt to lure the German High Seas Fleet out to sea where it could be attacked, and to draw German naval forces away from the Baltic. The seaplane carriers Vindex and Engadine would launch an air attack on the German Airship base at Tondern. Minefields would be laid at the exits of the swept channels through the Heligoland Bight, which any German forces sortieing in response would have to pass through, with 10 submarines waiting off the Horns Reef and off Terschelling. The Battle Cruiser Force would be waiting 35 nautical miles (65 km; 40 mi) off Terschelling, while the battleships of the Grand Fleet would provide distant cover. Princess Margaret set off from the Humber on 3 May 1916, escorted by the destroyers Lark and Lucifer, bound for the western end of the Heligoland Bight. Princess Margaret left her escorts 60 nautical miles (110 km; 69 mi) west of the proposed minefield, continuing alone, and successfully laid 530 mines. The air raid itself was a failure, with only one aircraft managing to attack its target, and the hoped for confrontation between the British and German fleets did not occur, although one German airship, L 7, was shot down by the British light cruisers Galatea and Phaeton.

On 15 May 1916, Princess Margaret laid mines off the Belgian coast to reinforce the existing minefields. Princess Margaret and Paris laid mines near the Thornton Ridge on 24 May 1916, and on 4 August 1916, the British light cruiser Cleopatra stuck a mine off the Thornton Ridge, probably from this minefield. On 18 May 1916, as a response to the German Bombardment of Yarmouth and Lowestoft on 24 April that year, Princess Margaret, Paris and Biarritz laid a defensive minefield between Lowestoft and Caister to prevent further attacks by German surface warships. On 28 November 1916 Princess Margaret returned to operations in the Bight when, escorted by the destroyers Ferret, Sandfly and Moorsom, she laid 500 mines 20 nautical miles (37 km; 23 mi) west of Borkum.

Early in 1917, Admiral Beatty, commander of the Grand Fleet, proposed to completely block off the Heligoland Bight with mines. While this was not practicable at the time owing to a lack of efficient mines, minelaying operations in the Bight continued steadily in January 1917. Princess Margaret and Wahine laid 452 mines in the central part of the Bight on 25 January. Operations in the Bight continued in February, with Princess Margaret laying 543 mines out of a total of 1464 laid in the Bight that month. A minefield laid by Princess Margaret on 29 March 1917 may have sunk the German submarine UC-30 sometime after 19 April that year. On the night of 20/21 April, Princess Margaret, Angora, Wahine and Ariadne laid 1308 mines south west of the Horns Reef, the largest minefield of the war, while on 27/28 April, Princess Margaret, Angora and Wahine laid another 1000 mines 60 nautical miles (110 km; 69 mi) north west of Heligoland. As well as mining the Bight, Princess Margaret continued to lay defensive minefields in home waters, and on 8 May 1917, together with Angora and Wahine, laid 416 mines off Orfordness. On 20 May 1917, Princess Margaret, Angora and Wahine laid a field of 1000 mines 7 nautical miles (13 km; 8.1 mi) north of Vlieland. While quickly discovered by the Germans, this minefield proved highly effective, sinking the minesweeper M47 on 8 June 1917, SS Turin on 15 June 1916 and the submarine UB-61 on 29 November 1917. Later that month, Princess Margaret was under repair owing to turbine problems.

From 21 November 1917, Princess Margaret took part, together with the minelayers Amphitrite and Paris, the minelaying destroyers Ferret, Ariel, Legion and Meteor and several minelaying trawlers, in laying the Dover Barrage, a series of deep minefields between Cap Gris Nez and Folkestone intended to stop German submarines from entering the Channel from the east. Princess Margaret continued operations in the Channel until January 1918, when she was withdrawn to take part in the Northern Barrage, a more ambitious plan to block the exits of the North Sea to stop German U-boats from attacking shipping in the Atlantic. The start of laying the Northern Barrage was delayed by problems setting up bases and by the late arrival of American minelayers, and Princess Margaret, together with Abdiel and the cruisers Aurora, Boadicea and Penelope, laid a series of deep minefields at the entrance of the Kattegat to block passage from the Baltic to the North Sea, and later in February took part in laying a series of minefields near the Dogger Bank. Work began on laying the Northern Barrage in March 1918. By the end of the war, Princess Margaret had laid 25,242 mines, more than any other Royal Navy ship in the war.

=== Russian Civil War ===
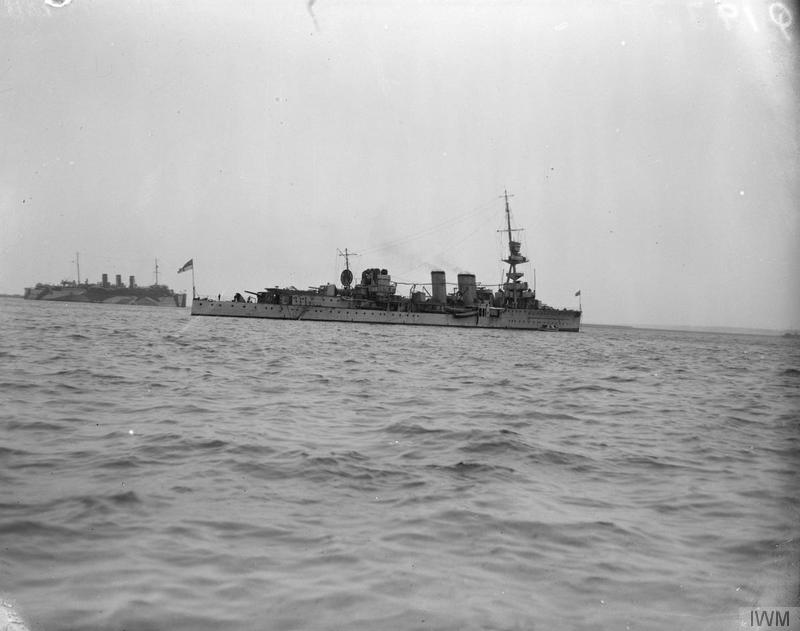
HMS Caradoc with Princess Margaret in the background at Libau (Liepaja). December 1918

Shortly after the end of World War I, Princess Margaret was part of the initial British deployment to the Baltic during the British intervention in the Russian Civil War. Described as a cruiser, she came to anchor in the roadstead off Copenhagen during the evening of 6 December 1918.

She and H.M.S. Angora (described as auxiliary cruisers) left Copenhagen with nine destroyers, bound for the Baltic on 8 December 1918. They anchored off Libau in Latvia at 11.00 p.m. on 9 December, entering the harbour at 8.00 a.m. on the following day. The made a visit to Reval on 13 December, but had returned to Libau by 16 December.

The ships arrived off Riga from Libau on the evening of 17 December, and found the city in danger of capture by advancing Bolshevik forces. The Admiral departed on 19 December 1918, to return to Copenhagen in H.M.S. Cardiff, leaving Princess Margaret’s Captain, Harry Hesketh Smyth, as Senior Officer at Riga.

By Christmas Eve the city was defended by an inadequate force of Baltische Landeswehr, and some Latvian volunteers organised by Marine officers from H.M.S. Ceres and Princess Margaret, who equipped them with 5 000 rifles brought from Britain in Princess Margaret.

As the situation deteriorated, Princess Margaret embarked 392 refugees (mainly British, Allied and neutral civilians) on 28 December, making room for them by discharging arms and ammunition intended for Reval into H.M.S. Windsor. On 30 December, Captain Smyth ordered H.M.S. Ceres to open fire on the barracks at Riga where Lettish troops had mutinied and declared for the Bolsheviks; she fired ten rounds, and later landed armed patrols. More refugees were embarked before the force left Riga on 3 January 1919, shortly before the city was captured by the Red Army. She arrived back at Copenhagen on 6 January 1919.

Princess Margaret returned to Britain with the rest of the force, which reached Rosyth on 10 January. She put in to Leith Roads with about 500 passengers on board on 12 January 1919.

Princess Margaret was formally purchased by the Royal Navy on 14 June 1919, and soon returned to the Baltic as the British intervention continued, this time as a minelayer rather than a transport, and in company with the minelaying destroyers of the 20th Destroyer Flotilla, reaching Reval at the end of June. Princess Margaret and the minelaying destroyers laid minefields to protect the British base at Reval from potential attacks by Russian ships, with Princess Margaret returning to Britain in September once the minefields had been laid. She returned to the Baltic in October 1919, and was present when the German-controlled West Russian Volunteer Army attacked Riga, which had been freed from the Bolsheviks earlier in the year, on 8 October. On 12 October, refugees from the fighting, including members of the British Missions, were embarked aboard Princess Margaret. Princess Margaret returned to Britain in December 1919.

=== Later career ===
Princess Margaret was refitted as an Admiralty Yacht in 1921. On 7 November 1924, Princess Margaret collided with the Danish auxiliary sailing vessel Marie Margaretha in the English Channel 10 nautical miles (19 km; 12 mi) off the Owers Lightship. Marie Margaretha sank, and Princess Margaret rescued all twelve members of her crew.

Princess Margaret was sold for scrap on 30 May 1929.
