= SS Princess Beatrice =

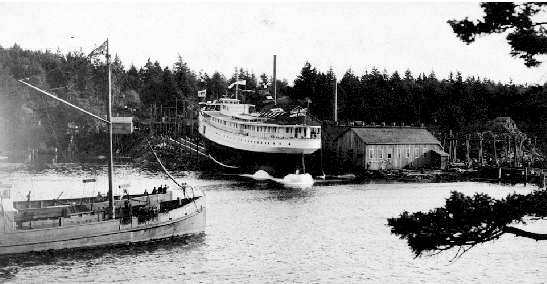
- Launching of Princess Beatrice at Esquimalt, British Columbia on September 10, 1903

History
- Name: Princess Beatrice
- Owner: Canadian Pacific Railway Coast Service
- Route: coastal British Columbia, Puget Sound
- Builder: B.C. Marine Railway Co. Ltd., Esquimalt
- Completed: 1903
- Out of service: 1928
- Identification: Canada registry #116405
- Fate: Converted to floating cannery

General characteristics
- Class & type: Coastal steamship
- Tonnage: 1,290 GRT
- Length: 197 ft (60 m)
- Beam: 37 ft (11 m)
- Depth: 15 ft (5 m) depth of hold
- Installed power: Triple-expansion steam engine
- Propulsion: single propeller
- Speed: 13 knots (24 km/h; 15 mph)
- Capacity: 350 day passengers; 86 overnight

Princess Beatrice was a steamship built for and owned by the marine division of the Canadian Pacific Railway (CPR). The ship served from 1903 to 1928 in the coastal waters of British Columbia. The ship also operated on Puget Sound on a route from Victoria, British Columbia to Seattle, Washington. Princess Beatrice was the first ship to operate in the year-round steamship service between Seattle and Victoria that was run by CPR from 1904 to 1959. This ship should not be confused with an earlier Princess Beatrice, built in Scotland in 1874, which served on the Atlantic coast of Canada.

== Design and construction ==
Princess Beatrice was built in 1903 at Esquimalt, British Columbia by the B.C. Marine Railway Co., Ltd. The Princess Beatrice was the first Princess ship built for the Canadian Pacific Railway.

The dimensions of the ship were 197 feet (60 m) in length, 37-foot (11 m) beam, and 15-foot (4.6 m) depth of hold, 1,290 gross register tons (GRT). The power plant was a triple expansion steam engine, manufactured by Bow, McLachlan & Co. of Paisley, Scotland, producing 1,392 horsepower (1,038 kW). The engine had three cylinders, with diameters ranging from high pressure to low pressure of 18, 30 and 50 inches (1,300 mm), with a bore stroke on all three cylinders of 36 inches (910 mm). The ship had design speed of 13 knots (24 km/h; 15 mph) and was driven by a single propeller. The ship was built of wood. Princess Beatrice was one of the largest vessels to have been constructed in British Columbia up to that time. The cost of construction was $200,000.

The ship was launched on September 10, 1903. Trial runs were completed in November 1903. The Canadian registration number was 116405. The ship was licensed for 350 day passengers. There were 40 staterooms which could accommodate 86 overnight passengers. The ship's accommodations were considered to be luxurious, and they included, consistent with the practices of the times, a separate cabin for women and children.

== Operations ==
Captain James W. Troup, the superintendent of the CPR coast steamship division, intended that Princess Beatrice be operated on the run between Victoria and New Westminster until the spring of 1904, when the ship was to be transferred to a route to the Nass River and southeastern Alaska. However, with the sinking of the American steamship Clallam en route from Seattle to Victoria on January 7, 1904, the citizens of Victoria asked that the CPR put a replacement steamer on the Victoria–Seattle run. In response Troup assigned the Princess Beatrice to the route, with the ship making its first trip to Seattle on January 20, 1904. This marked the beginning of a year-round daily passenger service that was maintained between Seattle and Victoria by the CPR Coast Service until 1959. This became part of the "Triangle Route" of steamships running between Seattle, Victoria, and Vancouver, British Columbia. Beatrice docked at Pier 2 in Seattle. While in this service, Princess Beatrice was drawn into a rate war on the Victoria route that broke out between the CPR Coast Service and its American rival, the Puget Sound Navigation Company

When the Princess Royal was brought into service in 1907, the plan became to relieve the Princess Beatrice on the Seattle–Victoria round in the winter, and use the Princess Beatrice on the Prince Rupert run. Beatrice served on the North Coast of British Columbia, making stops at the mining, logging and cannery ports along the northern coast.

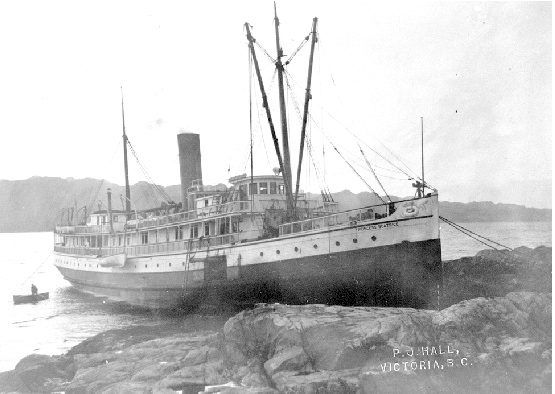
Princess Beatrice aground on Noble Island, October, 1911.

In October 1911 Princess Beatrice ran aground on Noble Island. Economic dislocation in November 1914, caused by World War I forced CPR to idle half of its fleet, including Princess Beatrice. Captain Thomas Rippon, later appointed superintendent of the CPR Coast Service, was in command of Princess Beatrice from 1916 to 1920.

== Disposition ==
In 1928 the CPR brought a new vessel, the Princess Norah into service, and was able to retire the Princess Beatrice. Princess Beatrice was sold to B.L. Johnson, Walton & Co., a Vancouver concern, who removed the ship's machinery and converted the hulk to a floating cannery. The ex-Princess Beatrice, now a cannery, was then towed to the west coast of Vancouver Island.

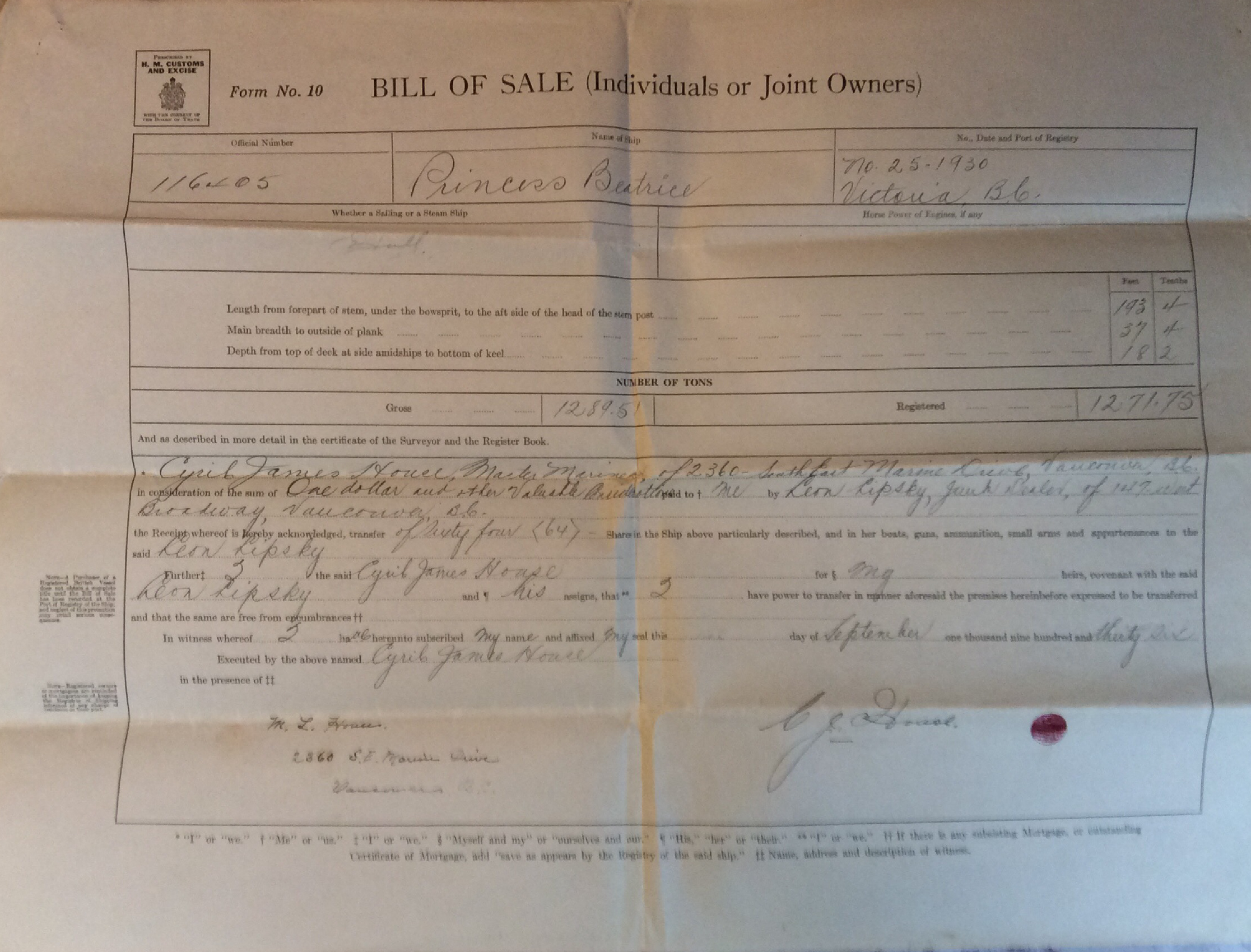
Princess Beatrice - Bill of Sale to Captain House, May 23, 1935

Scrapped about 1930, a bill of sale from May 23, 1935, shows the cannery hulk was sold by British Columbia Packers Limited to Captain Cyril James House for, "one dollar and any other valuable considerations". The Princess Beatrice was the only Princess ship not converted to burn oil fuel.
