= MV Princess of Acadia (1971) =

Ferry

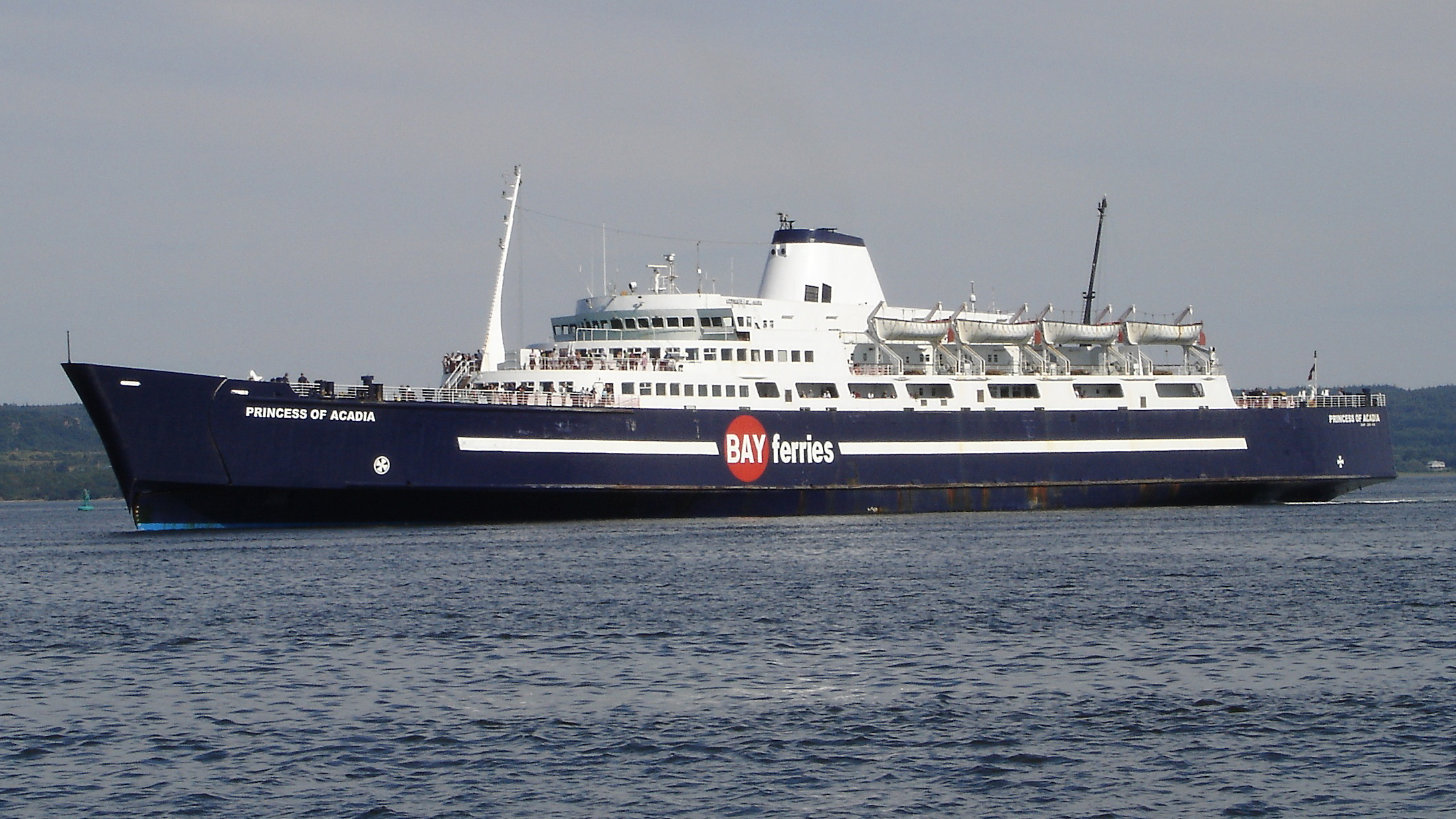
- MV Princess of Acadia, Saint John, NB to Digby, NS ferry.

History
- Name: Princess of Acadia
- Owner: Minister of Transport (1976-2015); CP Ships (1971-1976)
- Operator: Bay Ferries (1997-2015); Marine Atlantic (1986-1997); CN Marine (1976-1986); CP Ships (1971-1976)
- Port of registry: Canada, Saint John
- Route: Bay of Fundy
- Ordered: 1969
- Builder: Saint John Shipbuilding & Dry Dock Co., Ltd., Saint John
- Cost: $8-million CAD
- Laid down: January 1, 1970
- Completed: 1971
- Acquired: May 27, 1971
- Maiden voyage: June 1, 1971
- In service: May 27, 1971
- Out of service: July 28, 2015
- Identification: Call sign: VGDT; IMO number: 7039567; MMSI number: 316003563
- Fate: Scrapped
- Notes: Replaced by MV Fundy Rose

General characteristics
- Tonnage: 10,051.71 GT, 2,447 DWT
- Length: 480 ft (150 m)
- Beam: 66 ft (20 m)
- Draught: 15 ft (4.6 m)
- Depth: 40 ft (12 m)
- Propulsion: 2 diesel electric engines
- Capacity: 650 passengers
- Crew: 28

MV Princess of Acadia was a roll-on/roll-off passenger and motor vehicle ferry that traveled between Digby, Nova Scotia and Saint John, New Brunswick, crossing the Bay of Fundy. The vessel held 650 passengers and could transport 180 automobile equivalents. On July 28, 2015 the ship was replaced by MV Fundy Rose.

== Career ==
In 1969 Canadian Pacific Limited subsidiary CP Ships sought to renew its Digby - Saint John passenger-only ferry service operated by SS Princess of Acadia. The federal government subsidized construction of the new passenger and motor vehicle ferry Princess of Acadia at Saint John Shipbuilding & Dry Dock Co., Ltd. and built new ferry terminals at Digby and Saint John in exchange for a commitment from CP Ships to operate the service until such time as it was no longer profitable. Princess of Acadia entered service in June 1971, replacing her namesake, and operated on the Digby - Saint John route for CP Ships until the service began to lose money by the mid-1970s.

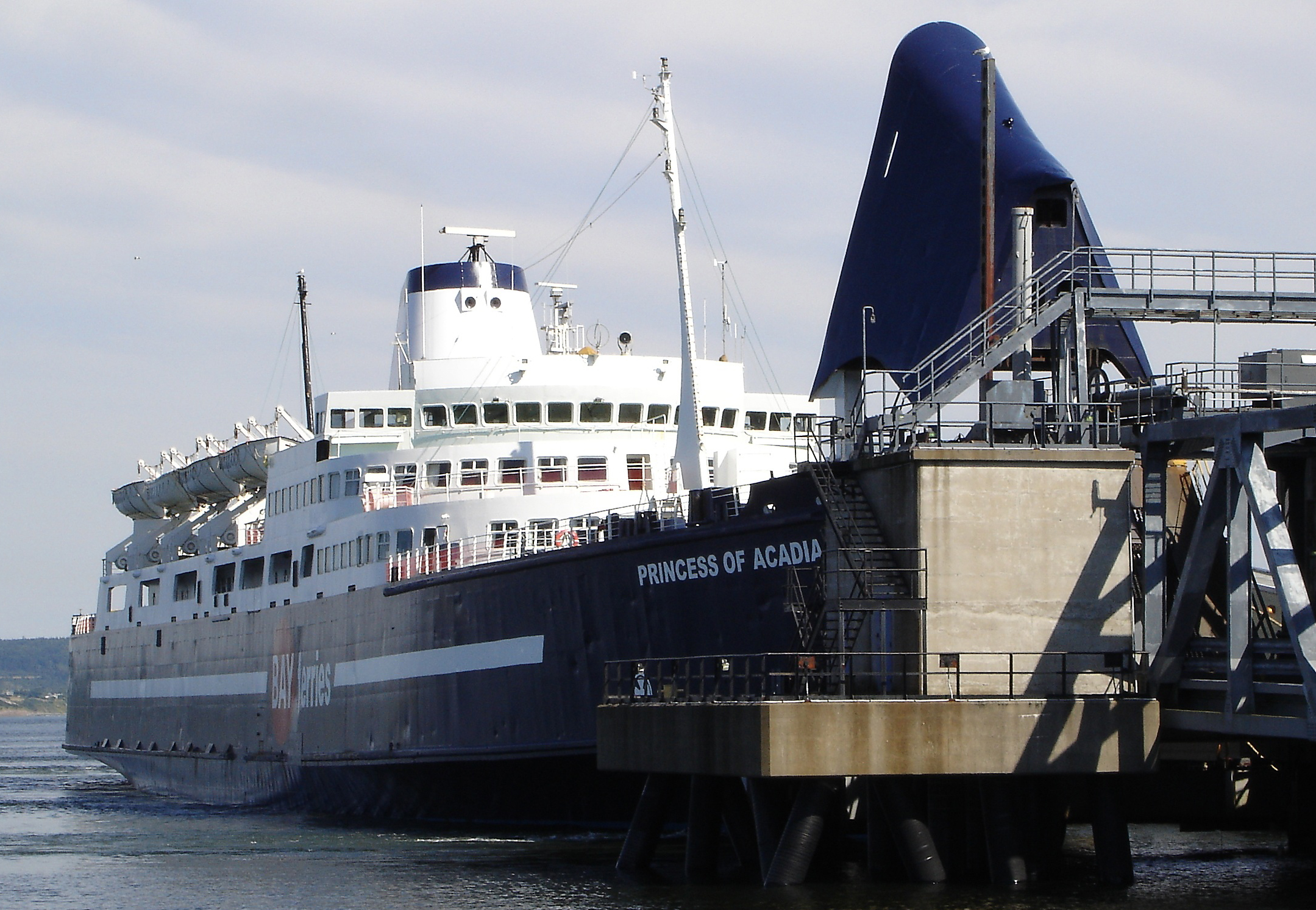
Princess of Acadia loading in Saint John with the bow entry raised.

Under the terms of the 1969 agreement, CP Ships transferred ownership of the vessel in 1976 to the Minister of Transport. The federal government transferred management of the vessel to the newly created Crown corporation CN Marine. In 1986 CN Marine was renamed Marine Atlantic. In 1997 the federal government removed itself from managing the vessel and operating and subsidizing the Digby - Saint John route. The winning bidder for the service was Bay Ferries, a subsidiary of Northumberland Ferries Limited (NFL); the federal government remained the owner of the vessel and the ferry terminals.

Princess of Acadia continued in service under the management of Bay Ferries after 1997. In the mid-2000s, the rising operating costs and absence of a subsidy from the federal government began to raise the issue of whether the ferry was sustainable. Beginning in 2006 both the provincial governments of New Brunswick and Nova Scotia as well as the Government of Canada extended an operating subsidy to Bay Ferries to keep the service operating. The Digby-to-Saint John ferry service received further subsidy from federal government in July 2014.

In 2013 the federal government announced $60 million in funding toward a replacement of Princess of Acadia. On 27 October 2014 the Federal Government announced the purchase from Blue Star Ferries, Greece of Blue Star Ithaki, built in 2000, for about €31 million. She will enter service in Canada in 2015.

Princess of Acadia was scrapped in Port Colborne, Ontario by Marine Recycling Corporation in 2018.

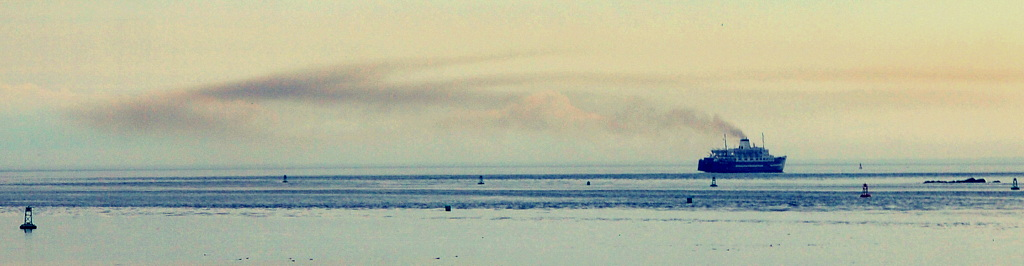
Princess of Acadia leaving Saint John harbor for the last time
