= SS Prince George (1910) =

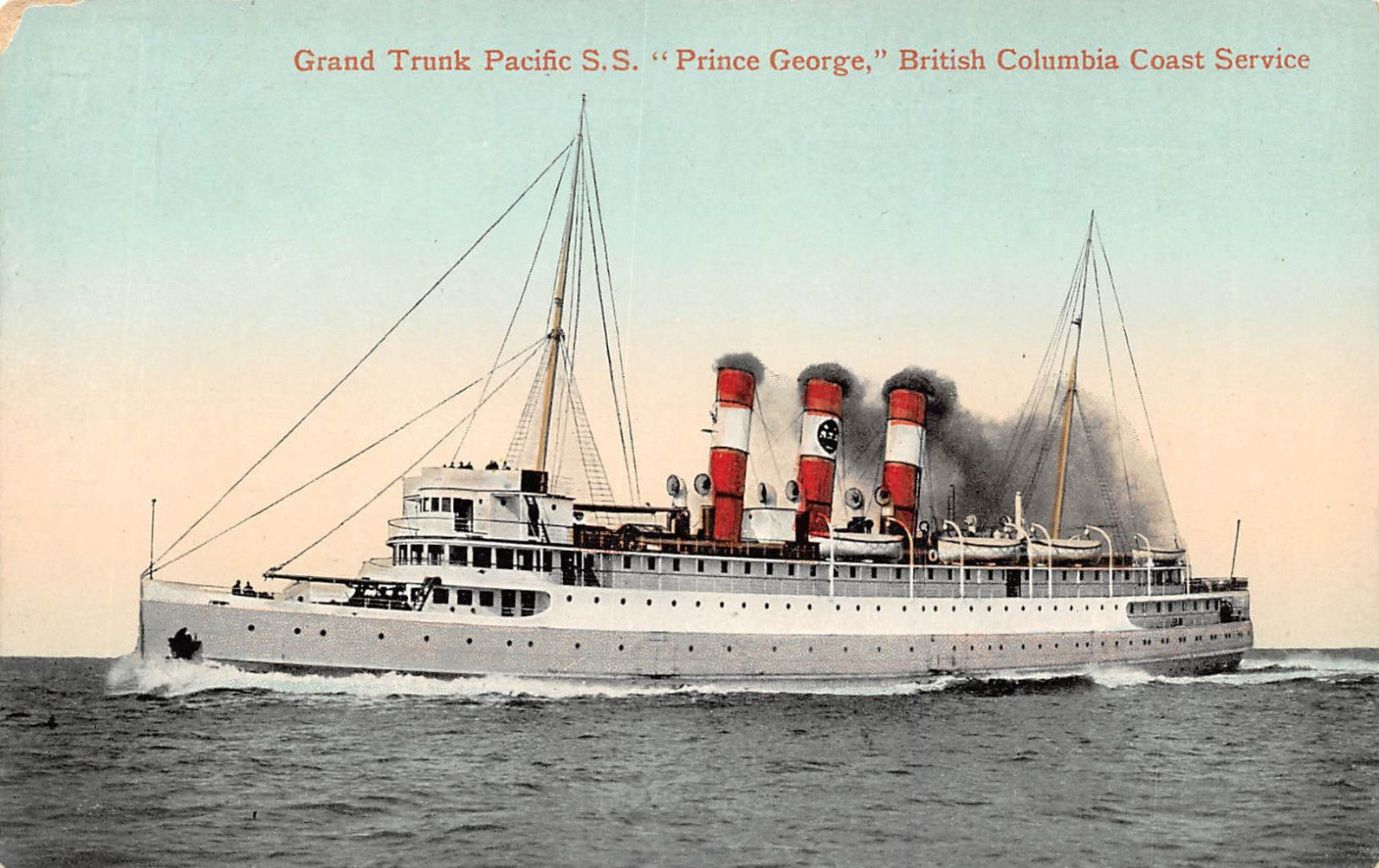
- Postcard of SS Prince George, 1910

History
- Name: Prince George
- Port of registry: Prince Rupert, British Columbia
- Builder: Swan Hunter and Wigham Richardson Ltd, Wallsend-on-Tyne
- Launched: 10 March 1910
- Completed: August 1910
- In service: 1910
- Out of service: 1945
- Fate: Burned in Ketchikan, Alaska; broken up at Seattle

General characteristics
- Type: Passenger/cargo ship
- Tonnage: 3,372 GRT
- Length: 307 ft 6 in (93.7 m) pp
- Beam: 42 ft 4 in (12.9 m)
- Draught: 8 ft 6 in (2.59 m)
- Installed power: 4 boilers, 6,500 ihp (4,800 kW)
- Propulsion: 2 shafts, triple-expansion steam engine
- Speed: 18 knots (33 km/h; 21 mph)

The Grand Trunk Steamship Prince George, and sister ship SS Prince Rupert, provided passenger service along the coasts of British Columbia and Alaska. In service from 1910 until 1945, the vessel saw brief service as a hospital ship for the Royal Canadian Navy during World War I. In 1945 the ship caught fire in the harbour of Ketchikan, Alaska. The burned hulk was beached on Gravina Island where it remained for the next few years until it was towed to Seattle, Washington, and broken up for scrap.

== Design and construction ==
Ordered from Swan Hunter and Wigham Richardson Ltd and constructed at their yard at Wallsend-on-Tyne with the yard number 859, the vessel was launched on 10 March 1910. Prince George had a gross register tonnage of 3,320 tons and was 307 ft 6 in (93.7 m) long between perpendiculars. The vessel had a beam of 42 ft 4 in (12.9 m) and a draught of 15 ft 7 in (4.75 m). The passenger ship was propelled by two shafts, each driven by a four-cylinder triple-expansion steam engine. Power was provided by two double-ended and two single-ended boilers creating 180 psi (1,200 kPa) under forced draught. This created 6,500 indicated horsepower (4,800 kW) and gave Prince George a maximum speed of 18 knots (33 km/h; 21 mph). Prince George and Prince Rupert both initially burned coal; however, in 1912 they were converted to burn fuel oil.

Prince George could carry 350 tons of cargo. The ship could accommodate 200 first-class and 36 second-class passengers. For excursions, up to 1,500 persons could be carried. Both Prince George and Prince Rupert were initially registered in Newcastle upon Tyne, but this was later changed to Prince Rupert, British Columbia.

== Service history ==
Initially, Prince George and Prince Rupert served regular runs from Seattle to Victoria, Vancouver, Prince Rupert and Stewart, British Columbia. However, Seattle and Victoria were dropped from the route after a few years, and Skagway, Alaska, was added. On one of Prince George's first trips up the coast, the passenger ship carried the Canadian Prime Minister, Sir Wilfrid Laurier, to Prince Rupert for a government announcement. On 19 December 1910, Prince George went aground in the First Narrows. Later refloated, the vessel suffered only minor damage. On 14 October 1912, the ship was struck by the small fishing vessel Lief E in Puget Sound. The commander of Prince Rupert ordered boats lowered, which then towed the fishing vessel to Harbor Island, Seattle, where Lief E was beached.

After the outbreak of World War I in 1914, the Pacific coast of Canada was threatened by the possibility of German raiders attacking coastal shipping. The old Royal Canadian Navy cruiser HMCS Rainbow was dispatched south in early August from Vancouver to cover the retreat of weaker Royal Navy vessels to Canadian waters after reports of German vessels along the west coast. Due to the unknown nature of the force Rainbow might encounter, Prince George was taken over by the Royal Canadian Navy on 8 August and hurriedly outfitted as a 200-bed hospital ship. The ship was then sent south to provide support to the Canadian cruiser. Sailing separately, Prince George was sighted by Rainbow and, due to hospital ship's three funnels and cruiser stern, initially mistaken for one of the German warships. This led the commander of Rainbow, Walter Hose to turn away and retreat. However, the identity of the ship was rectified and the two vessels returned to port. On 14 August, Prince George, sailing off the coast of Washington, encountered the sloop HMS Algerine, one of the vessels Rainbow had been sent to cover. Rainbow joined the two ships and all three returned to port. Prince George was paid off as a hospital ship on 1 September and re-converted to a passenger vessel by her owners.

In 1919 Grand Trunk Pacific Railway became insolvent and was placed under the management of Canadian National Railways (CN) in 1920. In 1923, Grand Trunk Pacific Railway had been absorbed by CN and by 1925, the vessel was made part of the Canadian National Steamship Company. On 23 July 1920, the vessel struck the North Bluff in the Seymour Narrows. Able to make it to port under her own power, Prince George was out of service until 1 August. The vessel grounded twice more; on 30 December 1933 on Vadso Rock and 20 December 1937 off Princess Royal Island.

=== Fire and fate ===
On 22 September 1945 Prince George was lost after she caught fire while at dock at Ketchikan, Alaska. The vessel had docked at Ketchikan on a round-trip voyage from Prince Rupert. The ship docked at 8:10 am and at 8:20 am, the fire alarm began sounding after a fuel tank exploded aboard the ship. Firemen responded and fought the fire, but after an hour the crew and those passengers still on board the ship were ordered to evacuate. The vessel was pulled away from the pier by the tugboat General Kennedy and run aground on Gravina Island. Several United States Coast Guard vessels joined the attempt to extinguish the fire. They were unsuccessful, and the vessel continued to burn for the next couple of days, with the fire going out only after the superstructure collapsed. One crew member died in the fire, with the others returning to Prince Rupert on Prince George's sister, Prince Rupert. When the burned-out hulk was refloated is disputed, with most sources stating it happened between 1948 and 1953. The hulk was taken to Seattle, where it was broken up for scrap.

After the loss of Prince George, CN announced plans for a new Prince George. This ship was launched on 6 October 1947, and placed in service on the Alaska route in June 1948.
