= SS Princess Norah =

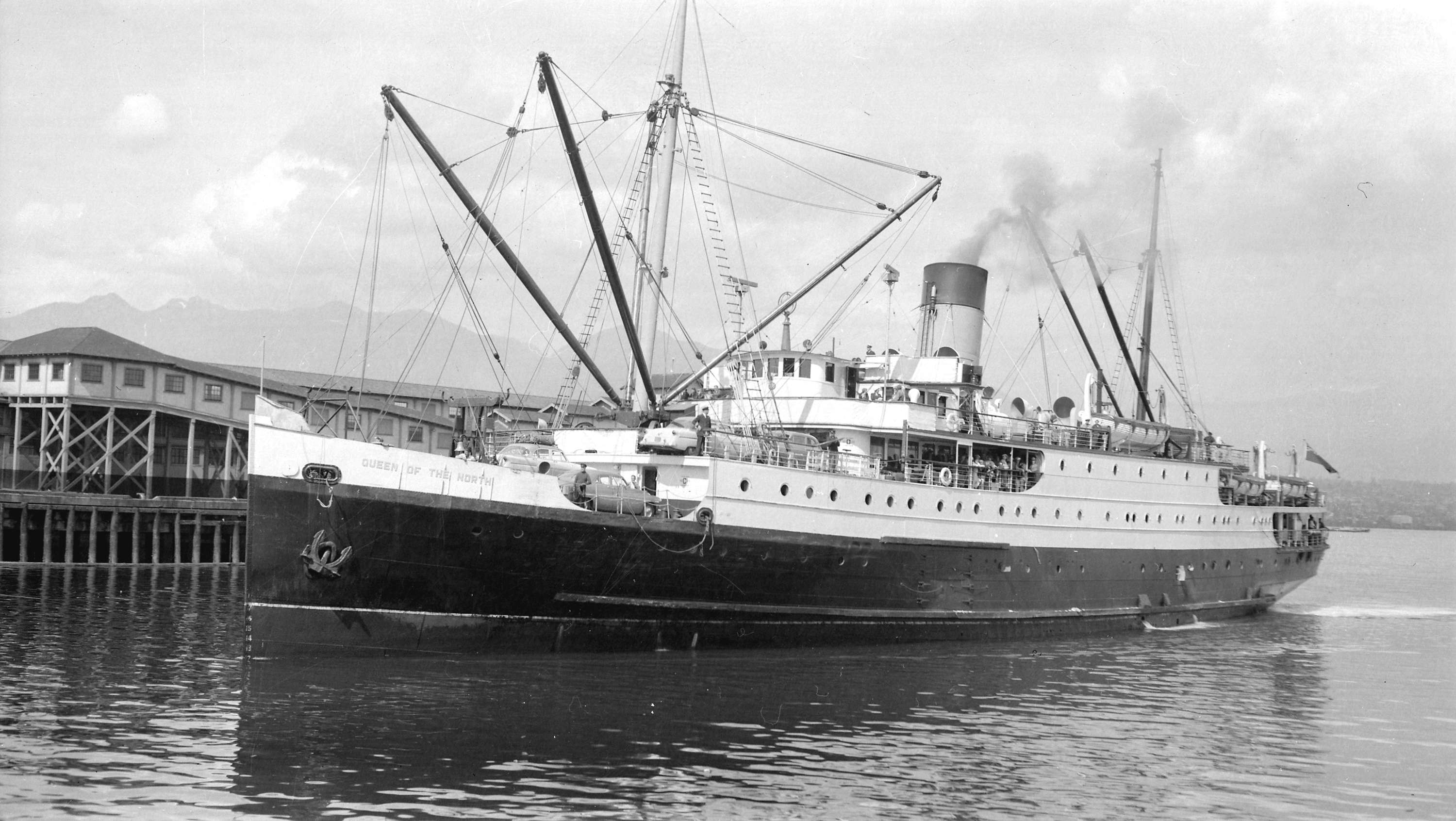
- Queen of the North in Vancouver, 1955.

History
- Name: Princess Norah
- Route: coastal British Columbia
- Builder: Fairfield Shipbuilding and Engineering Company, at Govan, Scotland
- In service: 1929
- Out of service: 1964
- Identification: Canada registry #154848

General characteristics
- Type: coastal steamship
- Tonnage: as built : 2,731 gross tons.
- Length: 250 ft (76.2 m)
- Beam: 48 ft (14.6 m)
- Depth: 23 ft (7.0 m) depth of hold
- Installed power: triple expansion compound steam engine

Princess Norah was a steamship which operated in British Columbia and southeastern Alaska from 1929 to 1964. From 1955 to 1958, this ship was called Queen of the North. From 1958 to 1964, the ship was called Canadian Prince. This ship should not be confused with the later similarly named motor ferry MV Queen of the North.

== Design and construction ==
Princess Norah was built in 1929 at the Fairfield shipyard in Govan, Scotland. The ship was designed for service to the rugged west coast of Vancouver Island. The ship was 250 feet long, with a beam of 48 feet and 23-foot depth of hold. The overall size of the ship was 2,731 gross tons. The powerplant, which drove a single propeller, was a triple expansion steam engine, with cylinder diameters ranging from high pressure to low, of 24, 38 and double low pressure cylinders, of 45 inches diameter each. Engine stroke was 36 inches. Norah was built with a bow rudder to assist in navigating in the narrow winding channels of the British Columbia coast. The ship had a capacity for 700 day passengers. There were an additional 179 berths in 61 staterooms for overnight travellers. The official Canadian registry number was 154848.

== Operations ==
Princess Norah arrived at Victoria in early 1929. Although the original plan was for Norah to completely replace Princess Maquinna on the Vancouver Island west coast route, this never happened. Instead, Maquinna remained the primary ship on the route, with Norah being brought on during the summer when traffic was heavier. In the winter months, Maquinna handled the west coast route alone, and Norah was used on the Inside Passage runs to Prince Rupert or southeast Alaska. CPR was able to replace the 25-year-old wooden-hulled Princess Beatrice, which was sold to a scrapper, who removed the machinery and converted the hulk into a floating cannery.

Communities served by Norah on the west coast route included, among others, Port Renfrew, Bamfield, Port Alberni, Ucluelet, Tofino, Ahousat, Hesquiat, Nootka, Tahsis, Kyuquot, Quatsino, Jeune Landing and Port Alice. According to a timetable issued July 27, 1935, Norah would make the west coast route three times a month, each time departing from Victoria at 11 pm. The first trip would begin on Day 1 of the month, with Norah reaching Port Alice, on the northern end of Vancouver Island, on day 5. Norah would then return on the same route, reaching Victoria again on day 8. (Fewer calls were made on the southbound trips.) The vessel then repeated the trip on Day 11 and on Day 21.

During the Second World War, Norah and the other ships of the CPR's west coast fleet were painted grey as camouflage, making them look like auxiliary naval ships. Also during the war, Norah was used as a relief vessel for Princess Mary on the Gulf Islands route. On April 21, 1943, while on the Gulf Islands route, Norah ran aground not far from Victoria. There were no injuries and the vessel was returned to service after undergoing several weeks of repair in a drydock.

In 1955, the ship was renamed Queen of the North. Under this name, the ship was operated on the Inside Passage as a joint venture with the Canadian National Railway. In 1958, the ship was transferred to the Northland Shipping Company and renamed Canadian Prince.

== Disposition ==
In October 1964 the engines were removed from the ship, and the powerless hulk was converted to the Beachcomber, a floating restaurant and dance hall in Kodiak, Alaska.
