= SS Princess Marguerite =

Series of Canadian coastal passenger vessels

History

Canada
- Name: Princess Marguerite
- Owner: Canadian Pacific Railway
- Builder: John Brown & Co., Clydebank
- Launched: 29 November 1924
- Commissioned: 1925
- Decommissioned: 1941 (as a ferry)
- Out of service: 1942 (as a troopship)
- Fate: Torpedoed

General characteristics
- Tonnage: 5,875 GRT
- Length: 369 ft (112.5 m)
- Beam: 60 ft (18.3 m)
- Propulsion: steam turbine; twin screw
- Speed: 22.5 kn (41.7 km/h)

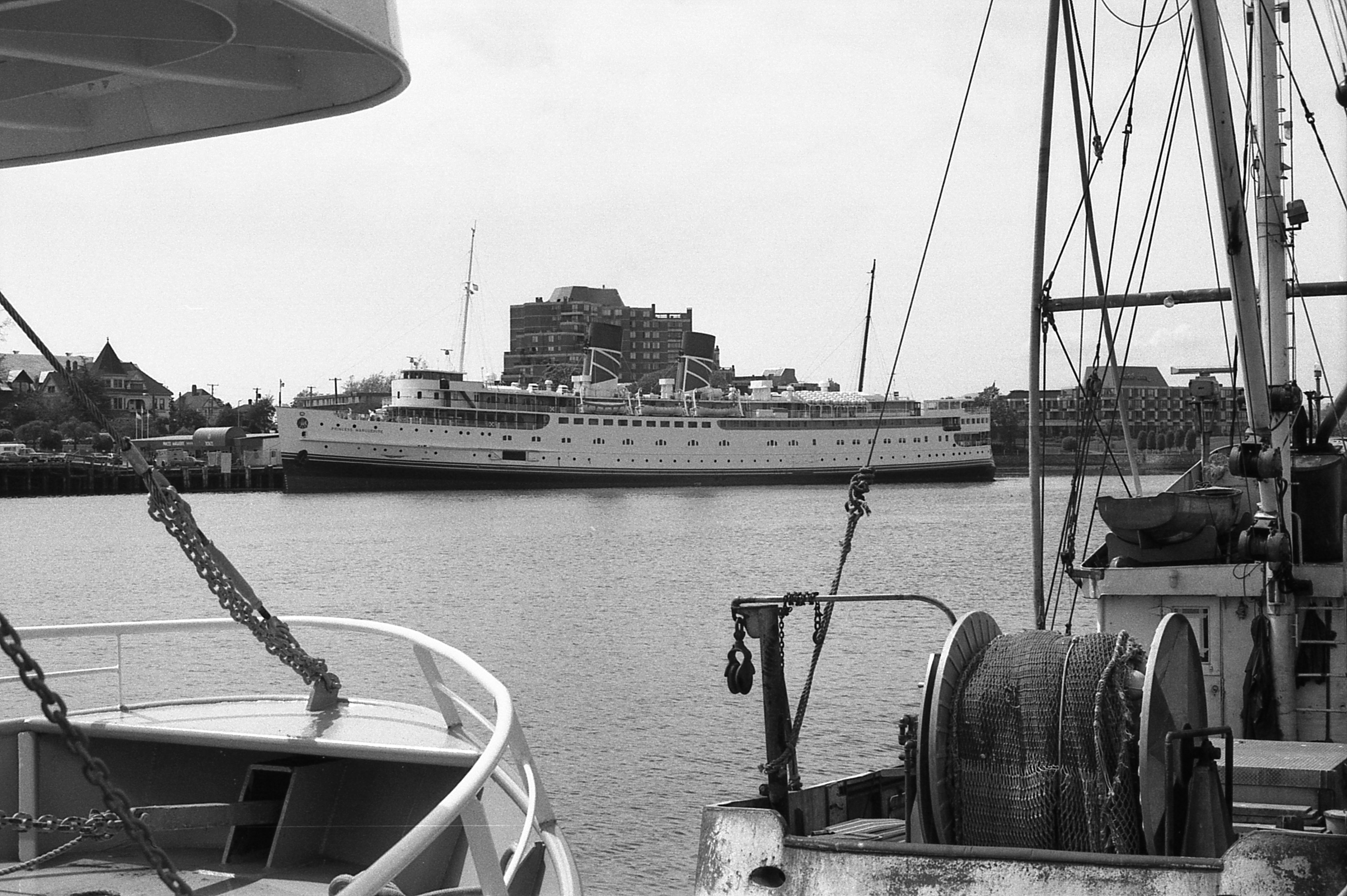
- Princess Marguerite II

Canada
- Name: Princess Marguerite II
- Owner: Canadian Pacific Railway, BC Steamship Company (1975) Ltd.
- Builder: Fairfield Shipbuilders and Engineers Company Ltd., Glasgow, Scotland
- Acquired: 1948
- In service: 1948
- Out of service: 1989
- Identification: IMO number: 5284900
- Fate: Scrapped

General characteristics
- Tonnage: 5,911 t (5,818 long tons)
- Length: 373 ft (113.7 m)
- Beam: 56 ft (17.1 m)
- Propulsion: turbo-electric transmission; twin screw
- Speed: 23 kn (43 km/h)
- Capacity: 2,000

Canada
- Name: Princess Marguerite III
- Owner: BC Ferries
- Builder: Victoria Machinery Depot, Victoria
- Launched: September 1965
- Out of service: 2017
- Renamed: Royal Victorian; Queen of Burnaby
- Identification: IMO number: 6510148; MMSI number: 316001246; Callsign: VCVV
- Status: laid up ready for recyclng

General characteristics
- Class & type: Burnaby-class ferry
- Length: 426 ft (130 m)
- Propulsion: Diesel; twin screw
- Capacity: 650 passengers, 192 cars

Princess Marguerite, Princess Marguerite II, and Princess Marguerite III was a series of Canadian coastal passenger vessels that operated along the west coast of British Columbia and into Puget Sound in Washington state almost continuously from 1925 to 1999. Known locally as "the Maggie", they saw the longest service of any vessel that carried passengers and freight between Victoria, Vancouver, and Seattle. The vessels were owned and operated by a series of companies, primarily Canadian Pacific Railway Company (CPSS) and British Columbia Steamships Corporation. The first two were part of the CPR "Princess fleet," which was composed of ships having names which began with the title "Princess". These were named after Marguerite Kathleen Shaughnessy, who was not a princess but was the daughter of Baron Thomas Shaughnessy, then chairman of the board of CPSS's parent, the Canadian Pacific Railway (CPR).

== SS Princess Marguerite ==
The first Maggie was constructed at Clydebank near Glasgow, Scotland, in 1924 for the CPR's British Columbia Coast Service. She was a class of vessel the CPR called "miniature luxury liners." On 25 March 1925, Princess Marguerite departed Scotland on her maiden voyage to Victoria, British Columbia, and for the next 16 years sailed the Triangle Route between Victoria, Vancouver, and Seattle. In 1939 King George VI and Queen Elizabeth sailed from Vancouver to Victoria on board the Maggie.

In September 1941, the British Admiralty requisitioned Princess Marguerite for use in the Second World War. After being refitted in Esquimalt, she sailed to Hawaii, Australia, the Dutch East Indies, and across the Indian Ocean en route to the Mediterranean, where she served as a troopship. On 17 August 1942, while en route in a convoy from Port Said, Egypt, to Cyprus with 125 crewmen and 998 British soldiers on board, Princess Marguerite was hit by two torpedoes fired by the German submarine U-83, sinking the vessel with a loss of between 50 and 60 soldiers and crewmembers. News of the sinking was withheld from the public until 22 January 1945.

== TEV Princess Marguerite II ==
The second Maggie, along with sister ship TEV Princess Patricia II, was built with turbo-electric propulsion in Scotland as a replacement for her predecessor to serve the Triangle Route. Service was restricted to the Victoria to Seattle route after the new BC Ferries began providing service between Greater Victoria and Vancouver in 1960. The harbour-to-harbour overnight service offered by the Maggie was not competitive with the much shorter and more frequent sailings being operated by BC Ferries on their shorter route. After the 1950s only day service was offered by this vessel.

The ship included special features found on the more grand ocean liners, including a grand staircase, ballroom, formal dining room, cocktail lounge, spacious and comfortable lounges, wide promenade decks, and private staterooms. She could accommodate 2,000 passengers and up to 60 vehicles on her car deck.

In 1974 Canadian Pacific Steamships halted passenger service entirely. The following year the government of British Columbia purchased the vessel, the Victoria terminal, and 8.7 acres (3.5 ha) of Victoria's Inner Harbour for $2.47 million. A $500,000 renovation was undertaken on the vessel at Burrard Dry Dock, which included repainting the vessel white with stylized Union Jacks on the two funnels and the stern, converting the second car deck to a lounge for 200 passengers, refurbishing the dining salon, and modernizing other passenger amenities to current standards of comfort. The Crown-owned British Columbia Steamship Company (1975) Limited was created to restore the daily passenger and automobile service between Victoria and Seattle to feed Victoria's tourist industry. The vessel's typical schedule had a morning departure from Seattle and a late afternoon return to Seattle. Her inaugural voyage under the new ownership carried Premier Dave Barrett of British Columbia, Governor Dan Evans of Washington, and 1,000 other passengers.

In 1979 the vessel was officially retired. In the summer of 1980 the BC Ferries Queen of Prince Rupert was renamed Victoria Princess and repainted with a Union Jack livery in keeping with the theme of the previous Maggie. In response to public response to this more utilitarian vessel, she was returned to BC Ferries and the Maggie was refurbished and returned to service for the 1981 summer season. In 1988 BCSC was sold for $6 million to the B.C. Stena Line, a subsidiary of the Swedish ferry operator. (In 1987 Stena purchased from BC Ferries Vancouver Island Princess, formerly the CPR's MV Princess of Vancouver, and ran her in tandem with Princess Marguerite.)

In 1989 Princess Marguerite, by then the last of the coastal steamers, was withdrawn from service. As scrap she was valued at $750,000. In 1990 BC Stena Line went out of business. In 1990 it was reported that the British Columbia government gave approval for the sale of Princess Marguerite to the Mykris Hotels Group of Bristol, England, pending court release of a claim by the Canadian Merchant Service Guild for unpaid severance pay for former ship's officers. The vessel was transported to Singapore where she was purchased by UK-based Sea Containers. In 1992 she was converted to a Singapore-based gambling ship. In 1997 she was scrapped at Alang, India.

== MV Princess Marguerite III ==
The third Maggie was a former BC Ferries vessel renamed to restore a Princess Marguerite to the Victoria-Seattle route. The vessel began her service life as MV Queen of Burnaby for BC Ferries, for whom it was constructed in 1965. Beginning in 1994 Victoria Lines Ltd., a separate BC crown corporation, transferred her to the Seattle-Victoria route and operated the vessel under the name MV Royal Victorian, offering once-daily service. In 1997 Clipper Navigation of Seattle took over the service under a $120,000 per year lease-purchase agreement from Victoria Lines, and operated the vessel with the historical Maggie name. She operated with a capacity of 200 vehicles and 1,070 passengers. To boost revenue, an on-board casino was installed but only open while in Canadian territorial waters. In 1999 the service was discontinued entirely and the vessel was returned to BC Ferries who has since operated her under her original name.

== Competitors ==
The Princess Marguerite vessels had almost no direct competition on any leg of the Triangle route for much of their service lives. The ferry services run by the Black Ball Line (between Victoria's Inner Harbour and Port Angeles, Washington), BC Ferries (between Swartz Bay and Tsawwassen), or the Washington State Ferries (between Sidney, British Columbia and Anacortes, Washington) do not serve Seattle or come near the downtown harbours of either Victoria or Vancouver. In the summer of 1985 a private Canadian company operated Island Jetfoil, leased from Boeing, which offered service from Vancouver to Victoria and on to Seattle. The service operated for only six months before it was deemed too expensive to operate. Since 1986 Clipper Navigation of Seattle has operated the Victoria Clipper series of high speed passenger-only catamarans between Victoria and Seattle.
