= HMS Princess Irene =

5,394 GRT ocean liner

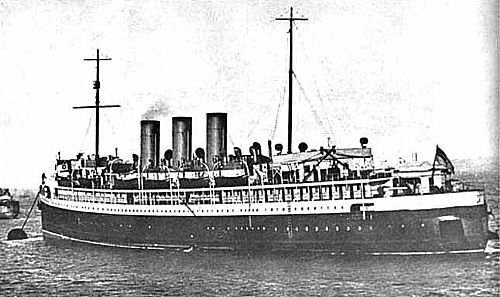
- HMS Princess Irene

History

United Kingdom
- Name: Princess Irene
- Owner: Canadian Pacific Railway Coast Service (1914–15); (United Kingdom of Great Britain and Ireland) Royal Navy (1915)
- Operator: (United Kingdom of Great Britain and Ireland) Royal Navy
- Port of registry: Victoria, Canada (1914–15); (United Kingdom of Great Britain and Ireland) Royal Navy (1915)
- Builder: William Denny and Brothers Ltd
- Yard number: 1006
- Launched: 20 October 1914
- Fate: Exploded and sank 27 May 1915

General characteristics
- Type: Ocean liner (1914–15); Auxiliary minelayer (1915)
- Tonnage: 5,394 GRT
- Length: 395 ft (120 m)
- Beam: 54 ft (16 m)
- Draught: 17 ft (5.2 m)
- Installed power: 4 steam turbines
- Speed: 22.5 knots (41.7 km/h)
- Crew: 225
- Notes: Sister ship Princess Margaret

Location where Princess Irene exploded

HMS Princess Irene was a 5,394 GRT ocean liner which was built in 1914 by William Denny and Brothers Ltd, Dumbarton, Scotland for the Canadian Pacific Railway Coast Service. She was requisitioned by the Royal Navy on completion and converted to an auxiliary minelayer. On 27 May 1915, she exploded and sank off Sheerness, Kent, while being loaded with mines prior to a deployment mission, with the loss of 352 lives.

== Description ==
Princess Irene was 395 feet (120 m) long, had a beam of 54 feet (16 m), and a draught of 17 feet (5.2 m). Her four steam turbines were built by Denny's, and could give the ship a service speed of 22.5 knots (41.7 km/h).

== History ==
Princess Irene was built by William Denny and Brothers Ltd, Dumbarton, for the "Princess fleet" of the Canadian Pacific Railway Coast Service. Her hull was launched on 20 October 1914. With her sister ship Princess Margaret, she was built to serve on the Vancouver – Victoria – Seattle route. Her port of registry was Victoria. Princess Irene was requisitioned by the Royal Navy on her completion in 1915 and converted to an auxiliary minelayer. She had a complement of 225 officers and men. On 8 May 1915, Princess Irene and Princess Margaret laid a minefield northwest of Heligoland, with Princess Irene laying 472 mines.

=== Loss ===
In May 1915, Princess Irene was moored in Saltpan Reach, on the Medway Estuary in Kent between Port Victoria and Sheerness, being loaded with mines in preparation for deployment on a minelaying mission. At 11:14 GMT on 27 May, she exploded and disintegrated. A column of flame 300 feet (100 m) high was followed a few seconds later by another of similar height and a pall of smoke hung over the spot where she had been, reaching to 1,200 feet (400 m). Two barges lying alongside her were also destroyed. The explosion was larger than that which had destroyed HMS Bulwark in the Medway six months earlier, although the loss of life was less. A total of 352 people were killed, including 273 officers and men, and 76 dockyard workers who were on board Princess Irene. On the Isle of Grain a girl of nine was killed by flying débris, and a farmhand died of shock. A collier half a mile (800 m) away had its crane blown off its mountings. A part of one of Princess Irene's boilers landed on the ship; a man working on the ship died from injuries sustained when he was struck by a piece of metal weighing 70 pounds (32 kg).

Wreckage was flung up to 20 miles (32 km) away, with people near Sittingbourne being injured by flying débris, some of which landed in Bredhurst. Severed heads were found at Hartlip and on the Isle of Grain. A case of butter landed at Rainham, 6 miles (10 km) away. A 10-ton (10,160 kg) section of the ship landed on the Isle of Grain. The Admiralty's oil storage tanks there were damaged. The sole survivor from Princess Irene was a stoker, David Percy Wills, who suffered severe burns. Three of her crew had a lucky escape as they were ashore at the time.

The victims whose bodies were recovered were buried at Woodlands Road Cemetery, Gillingham. A memorial service for the victims was held at the Dockyard Church, Sheerness on 1 June 1915. It was led by Randall Davidson, the Archbishop of Canterbury. Inquests were held on two victims of the disaster. The coroner stated that he did not intend to hold an inquest for any other victim unless there were exceptional circumstances that warranted it.

A Court of Inquiry was held into the loss of Princess Irene. Evidence was given that priming of the mines was being carried out hurriedly and by untrained personnel. A faulty primer was blamed for the explosion. Following the loss of HMS Natal on 30 December 1915 and HMS Vanguard on 9 July 1917, both caused by internal explosions, suspicion was raised at the inquiry into the loss of Natal that sabotage was to blame for the loss of all four ships. A worker at Chatham Dockyard was named as a suspect, but a thorough investigation by Special Branch cleared him of any blame.

== Memorials ==
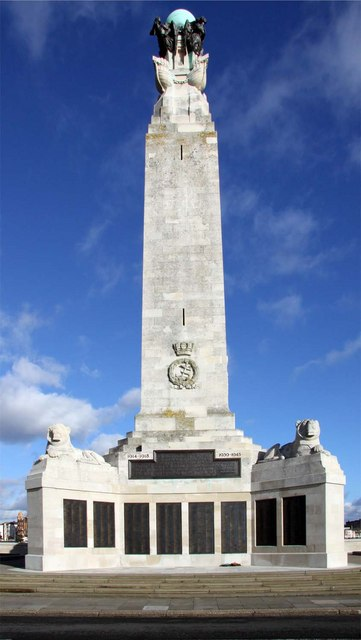
The Naval War Memorial, Southsea, on which victims from Princess Irene are commemorated

A memorial to those lost on Bulwark and Princess Irene was erected at the Dockyard Church, Sheerness in 1921. It was dedicated by Archdeacon Charles Ingles, the Chaplain of the Fleet. It was unveiled by Hugh Evan-Thomas, Commander-in-Chief, The Nore. Victims of both ships whose bodies were not recovered are also commemorated on the Naval War Memorial at Southsea.

Another memorial was placed in Woodlands Road Cemetery, Gillingham, as part of the Naval Burial Ground.

=== Media coverage ===
On 19 November 2002, the story of Princess Irene was covered by BBC Radio Four's Making History programme.

The remains of Princess Irene at 51°25.80′N 0°41.60′E are marked as an hazard to ships using Thamesport, but it is not planned to raise her.

== Sources ==
- Corbett, Julian S. (1921). Naval Operations: Volume II. History of the Great War. London: Longmans, Green and Co.
- Monograph No. 29: Home Waters Part IV: From February to July 1915 (PDF). Naval Staff Monographs (Historical). Vol. XIII. Naval Staff, Training and Staff Duties Division. 1925.
- Ingleton, Roy (2010). Kent Disasters. Barnsley: Pen & Sword. ISBN 978-1-84563-116-1.
