= SS Princess Elaine =

1928 Steamship

The SS Princess Elaine was a steamship that was built in 1928 by John Brown & Company, Clydebank, Scotland.

== Scrapping ==
In 1976 the SS Princess Elaine was purchased and scrapped by John Jack Gargan in Lake Union and at the head water of the Duwamish River. She was scrapped for her kitchen, ornate antique findings, furniture, port lights, metals and marine hardware. Some of the port lights were made into clocks by John Gargan. The clocks were of brass and myrtle wood. Only a handful were made and are sought after by marine antique collectors. Two were sold in Newport Beach Ca. and the rest in the Seattle area.
