= SS Princess May =

Steamship built in 1888

Coordinates: 58.54752°N 134.92440°W

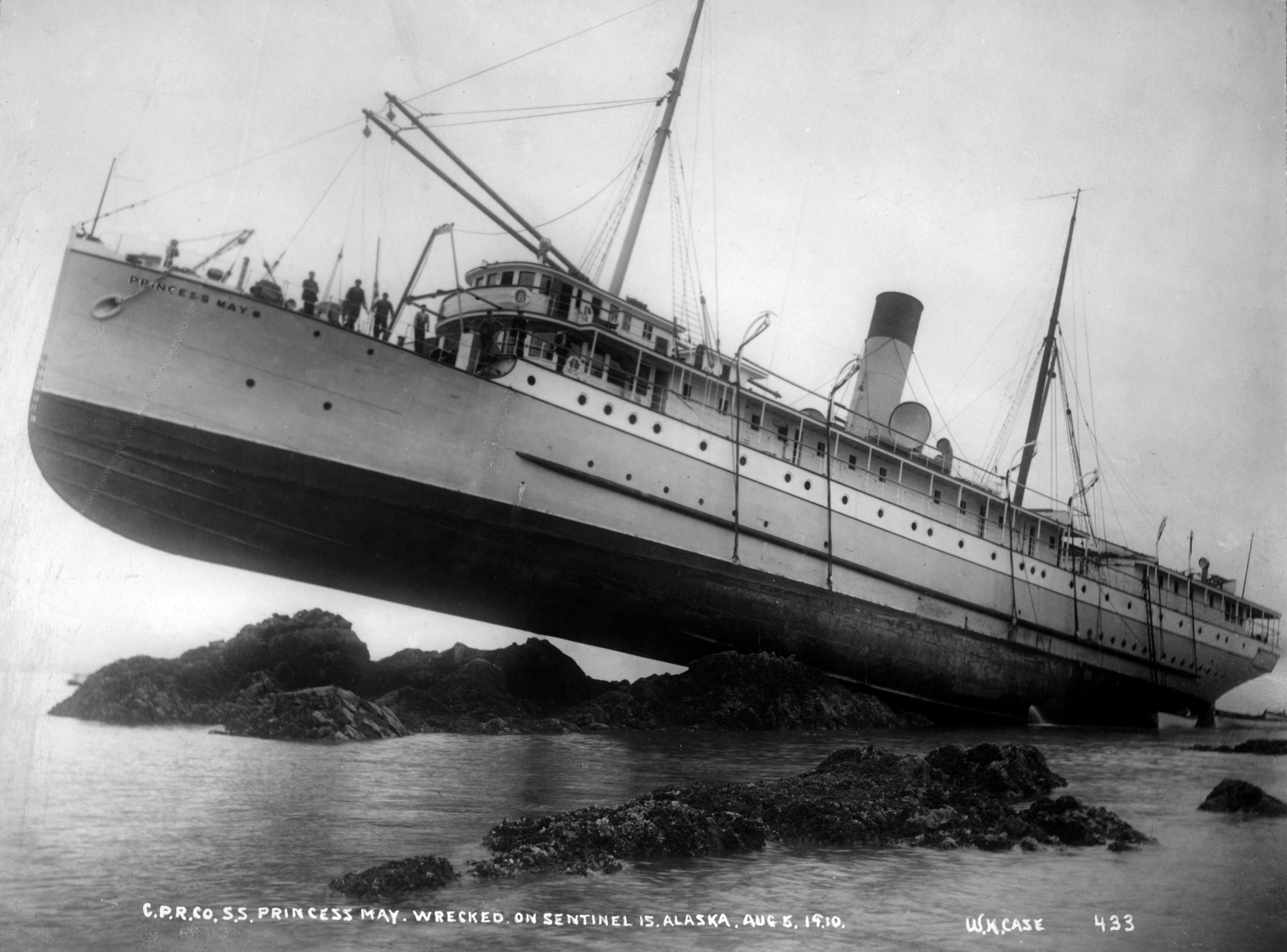
- Princess May aground on Sentinel Island, by W.H. Case.

History
- Name: Princess May (ex Cass, Arthur, Ningchow,Hating)
- Owner: Formosa Trading Company, Canadian Pacific Railway Coast Service, others.
- Route: Coastal British Columbia, Inside Passage
- Builder: Hawthorn, Leslie & Co. Ltd, Newcastle upon Tyne, England
- In service: 1888
- Out of service: circa 1935
- Identification: Canadian registry #109860
- Fate: Scuttled

General characteristics
- Type: Coastal liner
- Tonnage: 1717 gross; 1394 registered tons
- Length: 249 ft (76 m)
- Beam: 33 ft (10 m)
- Depth: 18 ft (5 m) depth of hold
- Installed power: twin triple expansion steam engine, 19", 30", and 50" x 33"
- Propulsion: double propeller

Princess May was a steamship built in 1888 which was operated under a number of different names and owners. The ship is best known for having been involved in a grounding in 1910 which left the ship jutting completely out of the water, which became the subject of a famous shipwreck photograph.

== Nomenclature ==
This ship, although it served under other names, is best known as the Princess May. The Canadian Pacific had a fleet of ocean-going ships with names beginning with “Empress". It was decided that the planned fleet of coastal liners (which in 1901 did not yet exist) would have names beginning with “Princess.” Princess May was named after Mary of Teck, who was known as “May”. Later Princess ships were not named after actual princesses, however.

== Design and construction ==
Princess May was built and launched under the name Cass in Hebburn, on the south bank of the River Tyne in North East England, in 1888 by Hawthorn, Leslie & Co., Ltd. for the Formosa Trading Company. Hawthorn Leslie built another ship, the Smith, at the same time for the Formosa Trading Company.

Cass was 249 feet (76 m) long, 33-foot (10 m) beam, 18-foot (5.5 m) depth of hold, 1717 gross and 1394 registered tons. Power was supplied by two triple-expansion engines, each one driving a separate propeller. Each engine had three cylinders, which, ranging from high pressure to low pressure, were 19, 30, and 50 inches (1,300 mm) in diameter. The stroke on all cylinders was 33 inches (840 mm). Steam was generated by three coal-fired boilers. The ship was built with electric lighting installed by Rankin Kennedy of the Woodside Electrical Works, a Glasgow firm.

== China service ==
Cass served in the China coast trade from 1888 to 1901 under a number of different owners and names, including Arthur, Cass (again), Ningchow, and Hating, the ship's name in 1901. During the ship's service on the China coast there was a mutiny on board and the ship was attacked by pirates.

The arrival of Cass and Smith at Taiwan was called the “shipping event of the year” for the China coast. The Formosa Trading Company had been organized by the modernizing governor of Taiwan, Liu Mingchuan, based on the advice of a former manager of the China Merchant Steam Navigation Company. A contemporary source states that the ostensible purpose of ordering the two steamers was modernization of Taiwan, but the actual goal was to compete with the China Merchant Steam Navigation Company and its two allied English companies for the passenger traffic on the Yangtze River and between Shanghai and Tientsin.

The China Merchant Steam Navigation Company was able to defeat this challenge, and the Formosa Trading Company became defunct. Cass and Smith were then run by Taiwan's governor, Liu Mingchuan but in an unprofitable manner. Cass and Smith were said to have cost £59,000 and were not expected to be profitable in service.

== Canadian service ==
In 1901, the newly formed Canadian Pacific Railway Coast Service, operating in British Columbia under superintendent James W. Troup, wanted a steamship to meet the high demand for traffic on the route to southeastern Alaska, but did not want to wait for a year or more to build a new ship. Cass, by then operating under the name Hating (or Ha-Ting), was available. The Coast Service purchased Hating, and in May, 1901, under the command of Capt. A.O. Cooper, brought it across the Pacific to the west coast of Canada. Princess May was the first ship acquired by then-newly formed Canadian Pacific Railway Coast Service.

Beginning on 27 May 1901, Princess May was placed on the 800-mile (1,300 km) route from Vancouver, British Columbia along the British Columbia coast to Skagway, Alaska, running on alternate weeks with Islander. At this time, the demand for fast travel to Skagway was high, and steamships, including Princess May competed with each other to see which could first reach the port.

In 1906 the superstructure was rebuilt and the passenger accommodations were enlarged and improved. In 1907, May ran in alternate weeks with the newly completed Princess Royal. These ships served the many small mining, fishing and lumber settlements along the coast.

== Stranding ==
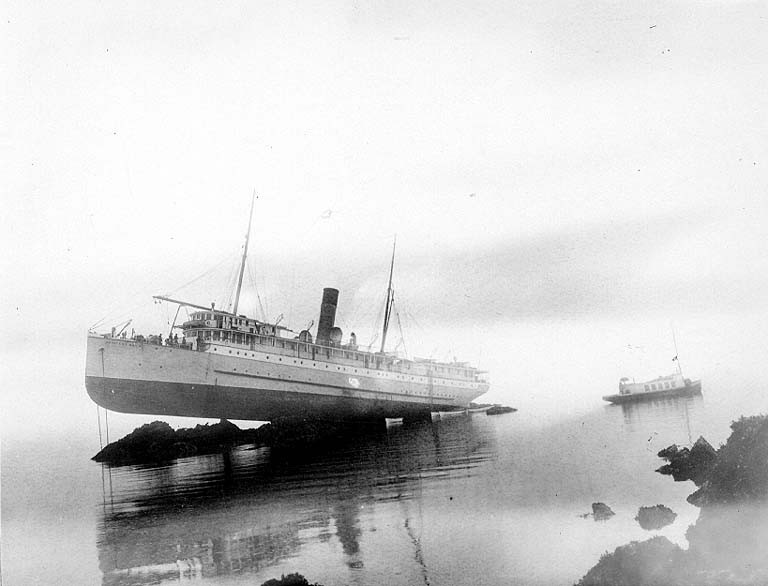
Princess May on the rocks, August 7, 1910

Princess May aground, as seen from Sentinel Island

On 5 August 1910, Princess May, having departed from Skagway under the command of Captain MacLeod with 80 passengers, 68 crew, and a shipment of gold, was proceeding south down Lynn Canal in heavy fog. At a speed of about 10 knots (19 km/h), the ship ran aground on rocks near the north end of Sentinel Island, where there was a United States lighthouse station. It was high tide (the tidal range being about 16 feet (4.9 m) at this point) and the momentum of the ship forced it well up onto the rocks, with the bow jutting upward at an angle of 23 degrees. This produced a number of photographs of the ship's predicament which were sold all over the west coast.

May was equipped with Wireless, but at that time it was not standard practice to equip the wireless set with auxiliary battery power. Thus, if electrical power was lost on the ship in general, the wireless would also go down. This happened on May when the engine room flooded. The wireless operator, W.R. Keller, did not have time to send out a distress call before the main power was lost. Thinking quickly, he ran down to the engine room, where the incoming water was by then waist deep. Keller rigged an improvised electrical connection with the engine room telegraph battery, and using this was able to send out a wireless distress call before the engine room was completely flooded. The message sent by Keller stated: “S.S. PRINCESS MAY SINKING SENTINEL ISLAND; SEND HELP.”

The close proximity of Sentinel Island allowed a safe place to evacuate the passengers and crew, as well as land the gold shipment and the mail for safekeeping. Later the passengers and crew were picked up by Princess Ena and other rescue ships and taken to Juneau.

Over 120 plates were damaged on the hull. The largest hole was about 50 feet (15 m) long and 18 inches (460 mm) wide. The engine rooms were flooded, and the ship could not move on its own. To remove Princess May from the rocks, the ship's owners hired Capt. W.H. Logan and the Seattle-based salvage tug Santa Cruz, as well as the William Jolliffe, one of the most powerful tugs on the British Columbia coast. Temporary shipways were built and rocks were blasted, and after several previous attempts failed, on 3 September 1910, the salvors were able to refloat the ship and tow it to port. This was the 32nd time that Captain Logan had successfully salvaged a ship. The cost of the salvage and the subsequent repair was $115,000.

== Conversion to oil fuel ==
In 1911, while undergoing repairs from the Sentinel Island stranding, Princess May was converted from coal to oil fuel. The ship was the first of the Princess fleet to be so converted. Oil-fueled boilers had many advantages. Coal-fired boilers had to be taken out of service to be cleaned and have ashes removed. This sometimes prevented the ship from reaching service speeds, and on occasion caused the ship to miss favorable tides on some of the narrow Alaska passages. Oil fuel sharply reduced boiler out of service time, so much so that on Princess May it was found that two oil-fired boilers could do the work of three coal-fired ones. Oil fuel also allowed a major saving on labor costs. One man on an oil-fueled ship could do work that on a coal-fired ship would require as many as 18 firemen and 9 trimmers. Refueling was also much simpler and faster.

== Later history ==
In 1919 the ship was sold to the Princess May (Steam ship) Company and transferred to the Caribbean. In the early 1930s the ship was scuttled.
