= SS Prince George (1947) =

SS Prince George passenger ship of 1947

History
- Name: Prince George
- Owner: Canadian National
- Port of registry: Canada
- Route: Inside Passage
- Builder: Yarrows Ltd, Esquimalt, BC, Canada
- Launched: October 6, 1947
- In service: June 1948
- Out of service: 1995
- Fate: Burned in Britannia Beach, BC, and later towed to scrappers in China, but sank on the way.

General characteristics
- Class & type: coastal liner
- Tonnage: 5,812 gross tons
- Length: 350 ft (107 m)
- Beam: 52.1 ft (15.9 m)
- Depth: 17.7 ft (5.4 m)
- Decks: 7
- Installed power: twin steam engines, six cylinder, bore of 23 in (580 mm) and stroke of 26 in (660 mm)
- Propulsion: propeller
- Speed: 18 kn (33 km/h; 21 mph)
- Capacity: 322 passengers, 50,000 ft^{3} (1,400 m^{3}) freight

SS Prince George was a passenger ship built in 1947 for the Canadian National Steamship Company, to ply the route from Vancouver, British Columbia, Canada, to southeastern Alaska, United States.

She replaced the 1910 SS Prince George of the Grand Trunk Pacific Railway, which was declared a constructive total loss after burning in Ketchikan, Alaska, on September 22, 1945.

== Construction ==
Prince George was built at Yarrows Ltd. at Esquimalt, British Columbia. The vessel cost $3 million to build. It was then the largest private commercial vessel ever constructed in Canada.

== Specifications ==
Prince George was 350 feet (107 m) long, with a beam of 52.1 feet (15.9 m) and a depth of hold of 17.7 feet (5.4 m). The overall size of the vessel was 5,812 tons. Prince George had accommodations for 322 passengers, all but 28 of which were considered first class. Each stateroom had fold-away bunks to allow it to be converted into a sitting room. There were several deluxe suites and also a children's playroom.

There were seven decks. The steamer had a moderately streamlined appearance. The ship also had space for 50,000 cubic feet (1,400 m^{3}) of cargo, including 5,000 cubic feet (140 m^{3}) of refrigerated space. An elevator allowed ready transfer of automobiles from storage on the orlop deck to the main deck for loading and unloading.

== Engineering ==
The ship was powered by two six-cylinder (23 in or 580 mm bore by 26 in or 660 mm stroke) Skinner uniflow steam engines, using steam at 240 psi (1.7 MPa) generated by four Yarrow naval boilers, each with four oil burners. Prince George maintained a service speed of 18 knots (33 km/h; 21 mph).

== Career ==
On October 18, 1953, Prince George, operating in a heavy fog with its radar nonfunctional, ran aground at Ripple Point, in Johnstone Strait. Captain E.B. Caldwell, then the senior Canadian National master, was in the bridge navigating by whistle and echo at the time of the grounding. Captain Caldwell saw the point shortly before striking it, and ordered the helm over, which spared the steamer from a head on strike on the point. As a result, the hull sustained only minor damage. Prince George was assisted to port with tugs, with one of its own engines still in operation. There were no casualties.

In 1959, Prince George, departing from British Columbia ports, was employed on summer cruises to Alaska.

== Disposition ==
The ship was sold in 1976 for use as a floating restaurant and passed through the hands of several different owners until October 1995, when it caught fire at Britannia Beach, BC, and was sold for scrap however while under tow to Chinese shipbreakers, the vessel sank in Unimak Pass.
