= USFS Osprey =

American steamer

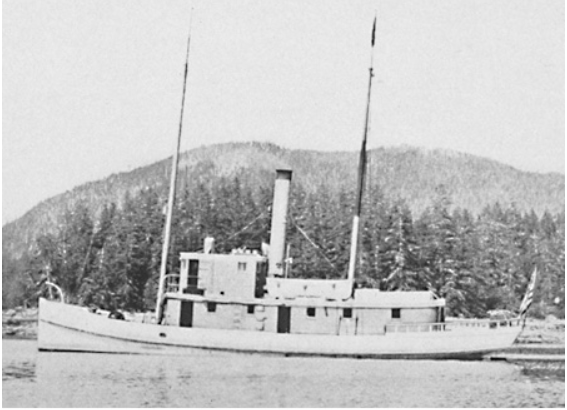
- USFS Osprey in 1914

United States
- Name: SS Wigwam
- Namesake: Wigwam, a term used for a semi-permanent domed dwelling used by certain indigenous peoples of the Americas in the northeastern United States or Canada
- Owner: Alaska Packers' Association
- Completed: 1895
- Fate: Sold to U.S. U.S. Bureau of Fisheries autumn 1912
- Notes: Operated as commercial cannery tender

U.S. Bureau of Fisheries
- Name: USFS Osprey
- Namesake: Osprey, a piscivorous bird of prey of the genus Pandion in the family Pandionidae
- Acquired: Autumn 1912
- Commissioned: Sometime between 1 and 8 July 1913 (see text)
- Fate: Sold on 14 April or 29 June 1921 (see text)

United States
- Name: Foss No. 19
- Namesake: Foss Launch and Tug Company
- Owner: Foss Launch and Tug Company
- Acquired: 1922
- Fate: Sold 14 May 1965
- Notes: Converted to motor vessel 1922; Operated as commercial tug

United States
- Name: Kiowa
- Owner: Pat Stoppleman
- Acquired: 14 May 1965
- Fate: Sold 1967
- Notes: Operated as commercial tug

United States
- Name: Kiowa
- Namesake: Previous name retained
- Owner: Samson Tug & Barge
- Acquired: 1967
- Fate: Sank 30 October 1978
- Notes: Operated as commercial tug

General characteristics (as BOF fishery patrol vessel)
- Type: Fishery patrol vessel
- Tonnage: 50 GRT; 31–40 NRT
- Length: 72 ft (21.9 m)
- Beam: 17 ft (5.2 m)
- Draft: 6 ft (1.8 m)
- Propulsion: 1 × 85 hp (63 kW) compound steam engine, Scotch boiler, and dynamo connected directly to a high-speed Corliss engine, 7.5 tons coal
- Speed: 8–10 knots (15–19 km/h; 9.2–11.5 mph) (average)
- Range: 350 nmi (650 km; 400 mi)

General characteristics (as commercial motor tug)
- Type: Tug
- Tonnage: 54 GRT; 37 NRT
- Length: 72 ft (21.9 m)
- Beam: 17.3 ft (5.3 m)
- Depth: 7.1 ft (2.2 m)
- Propulsion: 1922: 1 × 180 hp (130 kW) Fairbanks-Morse diesel engine; ca. 1940: 1 × 200 hp (150 kW) Enterprise diesel engine; 1967: 1 × Caterpillar D343 diesel engine

USFS Osprey was an American steamer that served as a fishery patrol vessel in the waters of the Territory of Alaska. She was in commission in the United States Bureau of Fisheries (BOF) from 1913 to 1921, and was the first vessel the BOF ever operated on fishery patrols in Alaska. Before the BOF purchased her, she was the commercial cannery tender Wigwam from 1895 to 1912. After her BOF career ended, she operated as a commercial motor tug with the name Foss No. 19 from 1922 to 1965 and with the name Kiowa from 1965 until she sank in 1978.

== Early history ==
The vessel was constructed as the 72-foot (21.9 m) coal-burning commercial steamer Wigwam in San Francisco, California, in 1895. Under the ownership of the Alaska Packers Association, she became one of the first cannery tenders to operate in Alaska. At some point prior to her U.S. Bureau of Fisheries (BOF) service, the Alaska Packers Association rebuilt her to a high standard based on recommendations made by the Steamboat Inspection Service.

== Bureau of Fisheries ==
=== Acquisition and characteristics ===
After the United States purchased Russian America from the Russian Empire in 1867 and created the Department of Alaska, enforcement of whatever fishery regulations existed in Alaska fell to the revenue cutters of the United States Revenue-Marine, which in 1894 became the United States Revenue Cutter Service and was one of the ancestor organizations of the United States Coast Guard. On 14 June 1906, however, the United States Congress passed the Alien Fisheries Act to protect and regulate fisheries in what by then had become the District of Alaska by placing restrictions on the use of fishing tackle and on cannery operations in Alaska and authorizing the United States Bureau of Fisheries (BOF) to enforce the regulations. The BOF had no vessels suitable for fishery patrols in Alaska, and during the next few years relied on vessels borrowed from other United States Government agencies (such as the Revenue Cutter Service), on chartered vessels, and on transportation that canneries offered for free to BOF agents. This approach was not satisfactory for various reasons, such as the requirement for vessels of other government agencies to perform non-fishery-related functions, ethical concerns over accepting transportation from the canneries the BOF agents were supposed to regulate, and the difficulty of enforcing regulations when the local fishing and canning industry personnel warned one another of the approach of BOF agents who had accepted transportation on cannery vessels. Each year after the 1906 passage of the Alien Fisheries Act, the BOF requested more personnel and vessels with which to fulfill its regulatory and law enforcement responsibilities. By 1911, when the Alaska fishing industry reached an annual value of nearly US$17 million, it had become clear that the United States Government needed to make radical changes in how it enforced the provisions of the Alien Fisheries Act, including funding the acquisition of a fleet of dedicated fishery patrol vessels under the BOF.

In the autumn of 1912, the BOF purchased Wigwam from the Alaska Packers Association for US$13,000 for use as the BOF's first fishery patrol vessel in what by then was the Territory of Alaska and renamed her USFS Osprey. Osprey had two masts, a steam winch on her forward main deck, a pilot house on her boat deck with quarters for three crew members, berths for six crew members in her forecastle, and accommodation for four crew members in her after cabin, which was finished in Spanish cedar and had folding berths. Her galley and dining room were on the forward main deck below the pilot house. She had a Scotch marine boiler and an 85-horsepower (63 kW) compound steam engine which gave her an average speed of 8 to 10 knots (15 to 19 km/h; 9.2 to 11.5 mph). Her dynamo was connected directly to a high-speed Corliss steam engine. For fuel, she could carry 7.5 tons of coal.

Before placing Osprey in commission, the BOF had to await a Congressional appropriation to pay for a crew to man her, and meanwhile stored Osprey on the ways at Semiahmoo, Washington. The appropriation for a crew came into effect on 1 July 1913, and the BOF quickly relaunched Osprey at Semiahmoo, assigned a crew of six to her, commissioned her, and prepared her for her first voyage to Alaska as a BOF vessel.

=== Operational history ===
Osprey departed Washington on 8 July 1913 to steam north for her first season as a BOF patrol vessel in Alaskan waters. She was assigned Southeast Alaska as her operating area, with her home port at Juneau, Territory of Alaska, and by the end of 1913 had logged 8,000 nautical miles (15,000 km; 9,200 mi) as a BOF vessel. Each summer, she enforced salmon-fishing laws and regulations in Southeast Alaska.

The BOF soon encountered difficulties in operating Osprey as a patrol vessel. The Congressional appropriation to pay her crew required them to pay their own mess bills aboard ship, leaving crew members without enough pay left over to make employment aboard Osprey worthwhile, so crewing her with competent personnel was difficult. She could carry only 7.5 tons of coal, giving her only a 350-nautical-mile (650 km; 400 mi) radius, far too small to patrol the districts assigned to her in a large area like Alaska, and coal was expensive in Alaska, costing US$8.50 to US$12.75 a ton. As a coal-burner, she emitted a cloud of smoke from her stack that could be seen at a significant distance, and with few steam cannery tenders in service in Alaska, the sight of smoke on the horizon was almost a sure sign of the approach of Osprey, giving fishery violators ample time to evade detection and interception. Her aging boiler, installed when she was built in 1895, required constant maintenance – although the BOF never replaced it – and her seaworthiness was in question. The BOF's deputy commissioner, Ernest Lester Jones, spent 60 days aboard her in 1914 and – noting that she had only 1 foot (0.3 m) of freeboard amidships, a height of 14 feet (4.3 m) from her main deck to the top of her pilothouse, and most of her machinery above the waterline – reported that she was top-heavy, on one occasion in the autumn of 1914 rolling without warning onto her side in a strong wind, causing her engine room to flood. He described her as unseaworthy, confined to her dock on many days when her boiler was in need of maintenance, and dangerously unstable, unable to leave port whenever a strong wind was blowing. In 1915, after two inspectors found Osprey to be in a poor state of repair, the BOF believed that she would be condemned at Ketchikan, Territory of Alaska, but she avoided this fate and remained in service.

In the spring of 1916, Osprey took part in stream investigation work at Wrangell, Territory of Alaska. After spending the summer of 1916 on her normal salmon enforcement duties in Southeast Alaska, she departed for Seattle, Washington, in October 1916 to undergo repairs there. She remained in Seattle for the rest of 1916 and throughout 1917.

In January 1918, Osprey finally returned to Alaska. In the late spring of 1918 she came to the assistance of the boat Good Tidings, which had broken down during a storm, and towed her 10 nautical miles (19 km; 12 mi) to Ketchikan. After the Canadian passenger liner SS Princess Sophia ran aground on Vanderbilt Reef in Lynn Canal near Juneau, Territory of Alaska, and sank in a storm on 25 October 1918 with the loss of all 343 people on board – the worst maritime disaster in the combined history of Alaska and British Columbia – Osprey joined the BOF fishery patrol vessels USFS Auklet and USFS Murre in a fruitless search for survivors that lasted into November 1918.

In June 1919, the BOF transferred Osprey to Southcentral Alaska, where she patrolled until August 1919. The BOF found her so unseaworthy by that time that it sent her to Cordova, Territory of Alaska, to be laid up, and decided to spend no more money on significant repairs to her. Plans called for her to patrol for the last time during the 1920 fishing season, after which the BOF would condemn and sell her. She was beached near Cordova in the spring of 1920 to have her hull cleaned and copper painted in preparation for patrol work in the 1920 season, but on 25 May 1920 she settled into the gravel on the beach, rolled away from the shore onto her side, filled with water, and became partially submerged. About a week later, the U.S. Coast Guard cutter USCGC Algonquin (WPG-75) arrived to help. Osprey was refloated using a Bering River Coal Company scow and the water was pumped out of her. She patrolled off Southeast Alaska during the summer of 1920 and in September 1920 took part in salmon stream marking, bringing her BOF Alaska service to a close. In early 1921, USFS Auklet towed her to Seattle to be sold.

According to a press report, Osprey was sold for US$550 at a public auction held in Seattle on 14 April 1921, but a May 1921 BOF bulletin claimed that the highest bid on 14 April, US$515, was too low, and the ship was not sold until a second auction on 29 June 1921 resulted in a winning bid of US$700.

== Later career ==
After her sale, the vessel became a commercial tug and may have reverted to the name Wigwam. By 1922, she had been resold to the Foss Launch and Tug Company, which rebuilt her to improve seaworthiness and replaced her steam engine and boiler with a 180-horsepower (134 kW) Fairbanks-Morse diesel engine. Renamed Foss No. 19, she performed tug and towing services in both Puget Sound and Southeast Alaska, based at Ketchikan during her Alaska operations. She was the first Foss vessel to operate in Alaska. In the late 1930s, she began annual voyages to haul oil to communities in Southeast Alaska. Her engine was replaced around 1940 with a new 200-horsepower (149 kW) Enterprise diesel engine powerful enough to allow Foss No. 19 to win many of the tug races she competed in during the 1950s.

On 14 May 1965, Foss sold Foss No. 19 to Pat Stoppleman. Stoppleman renamed her Kiowa and replaced her engine with a Caterpillar D343 diesel engine. In 1967, Stoppleman sold Kiowa to Samson Tug & Barge, which based her at Sitka, Alaska.

== Loss ==
While towing a raft of logs to Wrangell, Alaska, with the Samson tug Calumet in Southeast Alaska on 29 October 1978, Kiowa suffered damage during a storm. Calumet towed her to Herring Bay (57°07′N 134°22′W) on Frederick Sound in the Alexander Archipelago. The two tugs were still there on 30 October 1978, when the log booms broke up in bad weather, scattering the logs, and some of the logs tore open Kiowa's stern. The 83-year-old Kiowa sank in 30 feet (9.1 m) of water without loss of life. Calumet rescued her crew. Kiowa was valued at US$80,000 at the time of her loss.
