= USFS Murre =

American fishery patrol vessel

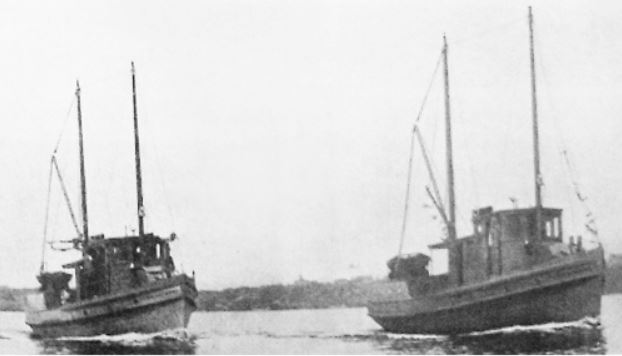
- USFS Auklet and USFS Murre, from Pacific Motor Boat, June 1917.

U.S. Bureau of Fisheries
- Name: USFS Murre
- Namesake: Murre, a seabird of the genus Uria
- Builder: Elliott Bay Yacht and Engine Company, Seattle, Washington
- Acquired: 10 May 1917
- Commissioned: Summer 1917
- Identification: WTFE
- Fate: Transferred to U.S. Fish and Wildlife Service 30 June 1940

U.S. Fish and Wildlife Service
- Name: US FWS Murre
- Namesake: Previous name retained
- Acquired: From U.S. Bureau of Fisheries 30 June 1940
- Fate: Transferred to U.S. Navy 1942

General characteristics
- Type: Fishery patrol vessel
- Tonnage: 25 GRT; 17 NRT
- Length: 48 ft (15 m)
- Beam: 12 ft 6 in (3.81 m)
- Draft: 5 ft 3 in (1.60 m)
- Propulsion: As built: 25 hp (19 kW) Frisco Standard gasoline engine, 600 US gal (2,300 L) gasoline, plus small sails for emergency propulsion; By 1922: 40 hp (30 kW) Frisco Standard gasoline engine
- Speed: 8.5 knots (16 km/h; 10 mph)
- Range: 3,000 nmi (5,600 km; 3,500 mi)
- Crew: Three, plus two embarked fishery agents

USFS Murre was an American fishery patrol vessel that served in the waters of Southeast Alaska. She was in commission in the United States Bureau of Fisheries fleet from 1917 to 1940 and, as US FWS Murre in the U.S. Fish and Wildlife Service fleet from 1940 to 1942. Murre and her sister ship USFS Auklet were the first vessels ever constructed for fisheries enforcement duties in Alaska.

== Construction ==
In 1916, the United States Congress appropriated $10,000 to the United States Bureau of Fisheries (BOF) for the construction of two fishery patrol vessels for service in the waters of Southeast Alaska. Martin C. Erismann designed the vessels as identical sister ships and patterned them after the highly seaworthy design of salmon purse seiners. Built out of Douglas fir, they had a raised deck forward of the pilot house that dropped moving aft, a raised deck house amidships which had an overhanging roof that covered the deck, and a small afterdeck at the stern. The sides extended upward to create the walls of the after cabin. Each boat had a 25-horsepower (19 kW) Frisco Standard gasoline engine and comfortable accommodations for two fishery agents and a crew of three.

Construction bids for the two vessels opened in Seattle, Washington, on 5 December 1916 and the project attracted seven bids. Ultimately, the BOF signed a contract to build the vessels with the Elliott Bay Yacht and Engine Company of Seattle. Construction began immediately. After the two boats were completed and inspected, the BOF accepted both boats, USFS Murre and USFS Auklet, on 10 May 1917. The total cost of designing, building, and inspecting the two boats came to US$9,702.70. They were the first vessels ever constructed for fisheries enforcement duties in Alaska.

== Operational history ==
The BOF commissioned both Murre and Auklet in the summer of 1917. Murre and Auklet departed Seattle on 7 July 1917 bound for Wrangell, Territory of Alaska. After they arrived, they took up their patrol duties in the waters of Southeast Alaska.

On 25 October 1918, the Canadian passenger liner SS Princess Sophia sank with the loss of all 343 people on board after grounding on Vanderbilt Reef in Lynn Canal near Juneau; it was the worst maritime disaster in the combined history of Alaska and British Columbia. Murre joined Auklet and the BOF fishery patrol vessel USFS Osprey in a fruitless search for survivors that lasted into November 1918.

In addition to performing their primary duty of fishery patrols in the waters of Southeast Alaska, Auklet and Murre often engaged in other activities. They assisted the United States Department of War in inspecting active and abandoned fish traps as possible navigational obstructions, and took part in routine stream improvements, which involved the removal of impediments to salmon – such as log jams and beaver dams – as they ascended to their spawning grounds.

In 1919–1920, the BOF loaned Murre to the United States Census Bureau. On 3 December 1919, a fire broke out in her galley while she was moored at Hoonah, Alaska, with her crew sleeping on board. The crew awoke and extinguished it, but not before it caused US$600 damage to the ship and considerable property loss to the crew. While conducting census work for the United States Department of the Interior's Bureau of Education, Murre struck a rock in Alaska's Keku Strait on 1 April 1920 and was beached to prevent her from sinking. Auklet arrived on the scene and towed Murre to Wrangell for repairs, which cost more than US$1,600. Investigations into both incidents found no fault on the part of Murre's captain or crew.

In September 1920, Murre and Auklet conducted stream-marking. Over the winter of 1920–1921, the BOF loaned Murre to the Bureau of Education and to the United States Department of Justice.

In 1921 Murre and Auklet began a program of annual springtime patrolling of sealing grounds near Sitka, Territory of Alaska, during fur seal migrations. By 1922, both Murre and Auklet had had their original engines replaced with heavier, 40-horsepower (30 kW) Frisco Standard gasoline engines that gave them additional power they needed to deal with the high winds and seas they frequently encountered in the waters of the Territory of Alaska.

In the spring of 1924, Murre briefly assisted the U.S. Department of War in looking for improper lighting on unattended fish traps and structures that could pose hazards to navigation in navigable waters in Alaska. In February 1928, Murre and Auklet both had water heating systems installed at Juneau, and later in 1928 each boat had her galley enlarged to increase the comfort of crew and passengers.

In 1930, Murre supported a project by Dr. Willis H. Rich to tag pink salmon and study salmon migration routes in Alaska. In March 1932, she assisted B. E. Smith of Ketchikan, Alaska, in transporting approximately 300,000 Japanese seed oysters to Southeast Alaska and planting them there in the hope of establishing a new food source. In 1936, she again supported Rich's salmon project.

In addition to her Southeast Alaska patrol duties, Murre occasionally patrolled in other waters of the Territory of Alaska. In the mid-1930s, she patrolled in the Katalla, Prince William Sound, and Seward areas.

In 1937, Murre was on a voyage from Seattle to Alaska when her crankshaft broke. The BOF vessel USFS Teal rendezvoused with her and towed her into port.

In 1939, the Bureau of Fisheries was transferred from the United States Department of Commerce to the U.S. Department of the Interior, and on 30 June 1940, it merged with the Interior Department's Division of Biological Survey to form the new Fish and Wildlife Service (FWS) as an element of the Interior Department. Via this reorganization, Murre became part of the fleet of the new FWS as US FWS Murre in 1940.

After the United States entered World War II, Murre reportedly came under United States Navy control in 1942 for war service.
