= SS Princess Sophia =

Canadian steel-built passenger liner

Coordinates: 58.6022°N 135.0236°W

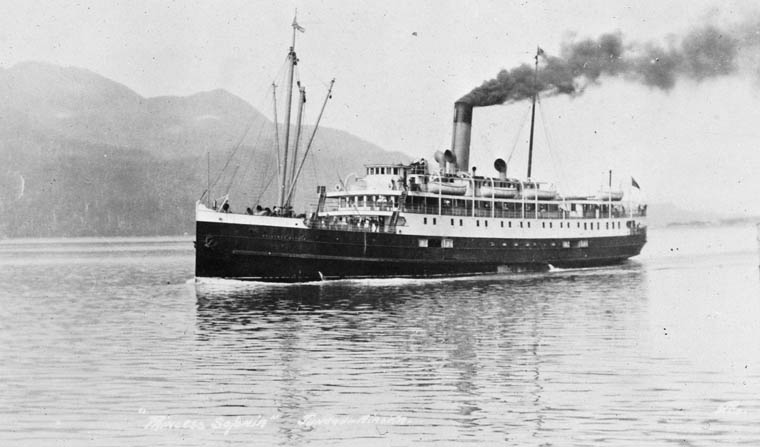
- SS Princess Sophia circa 1912

History
- Name: Princess Sophia
- Operator: Canadian Pacific Railway Coast Service
- Port of registry: Victoria, British Columbia, Canada
- Route: Vancouver and Victoria to northern British Columbia ports and Alaska
- Ordered: May 1911
- Builder: Bow, McLachlan & Co, Paisley, Scotland, UK
- Cost: £51,000 (about $250,000 at that time)
- Yard number: 272
- Launched: 8 November 1911
- Christened: By the daughter of Arthur Piers, manager of C.P. Steamship Service
- Completed: 1912
- Maiden voyage: 7 June 1912
- Fate: Grounded on 24 October 1918; sank following day during a storm

General characteristics
- Type: Coastal passenger steamship
- Tonnage: 2,320 GRT; 1,466 NRT
- Length: 245 ft (75 m)
- Beam: 44 ft (13 m)
- Draught: 12 ft (4 m)
- Depth: 24 ft (7 m) depth of hold
- Installed power: One triple expansion steam engine, 22", 37", and 60" x 36"
- Propulsion: Single screw
- Speed: 14 knots (26 km/h)
- Capacity: 250 passengers; could carry more with special permission (capacity for 500)
- Crew: 73
- Notes: Originally coal-burning; converted to oil fuel shortly after arrival in British Columbia

SS Princess Sophia was a steel-built passenger liner in the coastal service fleet of the Canadian Pacific Railway (CPR). Along with SS Princess Adelaide, SS Princess Alice, and SS Princess Mary, Princess Sophia was one of four similar ships built for CPR during 1910-1911.

On 25 October 1918, Princess Sophia sank after grounding on Vanderbilt Reef in Lynn Canal near Juneau, Territory of Alaska. All 343 persons on the ship died, making the wreck of Sophia the worst maritime accident in the history of British Columbia and Alaska.

== Inside Passage ==
Beginning in 1901, the Canadian Pacific Railway (CPR) ran a line of steamships on the west coast of Canada and the southeast coast of Alaska. The route from Victoria and Vancouver, British Columbia, ran through the winding channels and fjords along the coast, stopping at the principal towns for passengers, cargo, and mail. This route is still important today and is called the Inside Passage. Major ports of call along the Inside Passage include Prince Rupert and Alert Bay in British Columbia, and Wrangell, Ketchikan, Juneau, and Skagway in Alaska.

== The coastal liner ==
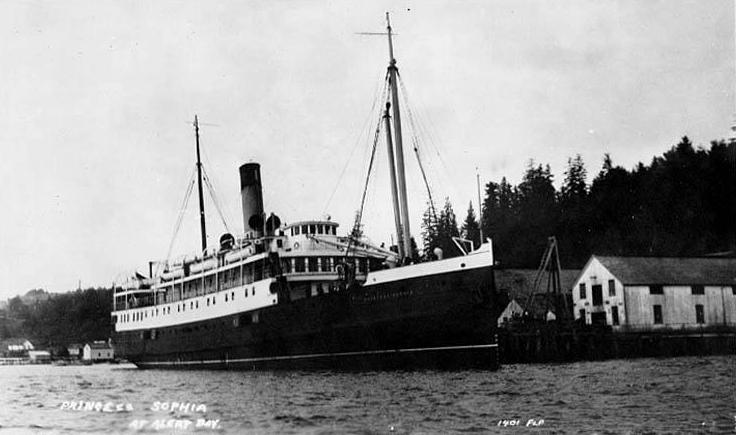
Princess Sophia at Alert Bay, British Columbia. A typical scene of a coastal liner calling at a port on Canada's west coast.

Many different types of vessels navigated the Inside Passage, but the dominant type on longer routes was the "coastal liner". A coastal liner was a vessel which if necessary could withstand severe ocean conditions, but in general was expected to operate in relatively protected coastal waters. For example, as a coastal liner, Princess Sophia would only be licensed to carry passengers within 50 nautical miles (93 km; 58 mi) of the coastline. Coastal liners carried both passengers and freight, and were often the only link that isolated coastal communities had with the outside world. Originally coastal liners were built of wood, and continued to be so built until well after the time when ocean liners had moved to iron and then steel construction. After several shipwrecks in the Inside Passage and other areas of the Pacific Northwest showed the weakness of wooden hulls, CPR switched over to steel construction for all new vessels.

Sophia was also referred to as a "pocket liner" because she offered amenities like a great ocean liner, but on a smaller scale. The ship was part of the CPR "Princess fleet", which was composed of ships having names which began with the title "Princess".

== Design and construction ==
Princess Sophia was a steamship of 2,320 gross register tons (GRT) and 1,466 net register tons (NRT), built by Bow, McLachlan and Company at Paisley, Scotland, United Kingdom. A strong, durable vessel, she was built of steel with a double hull. Sophia was capable of handling more than just the Inside Passage, as her use on the stormy west coast of Vancouver Island demonstrated. She was equipped with Wireless communications and full electric lighting. While not as luxurious as her fleet-mates serving the Pacific Northwest, Sophia was comfortable throughout, particularly in first class. She had a forward observation lounge panelled in maple, a social hall with a piano for first-class passengers, and a 112-seat dining room with large windows for observing the coastal scenery.

Princess Sophia was launched in November 1911 and completed in 1912. She was brought around Cape Horn by Captain Albert Adolphus Lindgren (1862–1916), who had also brought two other CPR coastal liners, SS Princess Adelaide and SS Princess May, out from Scotland on the same route. As built, Sophia burned coal; however, the vessel was converted to oil fuel shortly after arrival in British Columbia. At the time of her sinking, Captain Leonard Locke (1852–1918) commanded her, with Captain Jeremiah Shaw (1875–1918) as second in command.

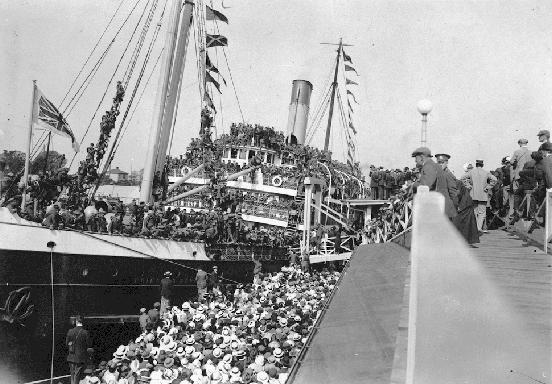
Princess Sophia departing Victoria c. 1915 with troops bound for the Great War

== Routes ==
On arrival Sophia was put on the route from Victoria to Prince Rupert. The following summer CPR assigned her to run once every two weeks from Victoria to Skagway, Alaska, alternating with Princess May and stopping in Prince Rupert along the way. Occasionally Sophia was diverted to other routes, such as an excursion to Bellingham, Washington, United States. When Canada entered the Great War in 1914, early wartime economic disruption resulted in a sharp decline of business for the CPR fleet and a number of vessels, including Sophia, were temporarily taken out of service by November 1914. Sophia and other CPR vessels transported troops raised for service in Europe.

On 12 September 1918, Sophia struck the United States Bureau of Fisheries fishery patrol vessel USFS Auklet while Auklet was moored at Juneau, Alaska. Auklet suffered significant damage to her deckhouse.

== Final voyage ==
On 23 October 1918, Princess Sophia departed Skagway, Alaska, at 22:10, more than three hours behind schedule. She was due to stop at Juneau and Wrangell, Alaska, the next day; Ketchikan, Alaska, and Prince Rupert, on 25 October; Alert Bay on 26 October; and Vancouver on 27 October. On board were 75 crew and about 268 passengers, including families of troops serving overseas, miners, and crews of sternwheelers that had finished operations for the winter. Fifty women and children were on the passenger list, including the wife and children of gold speculator John Beaton.

Four hours after leaving Skagway, while proceeding south down Lynn Canal, Sophia encountered heavy blinding snow driven by a strong and rising northwest wind. Captain Locke navigated the canal at full speed, possibly in an attempt to make up time. Due to the prevailing snowy conditions, the crew was required to use dead reckoning by blowing the ship's whistle and making calculations as to their location within the canal, based on the time it took for the echo of the whistle to return. The ship was at least one nautical mile (1.9 km; 1.2 mi) off course.

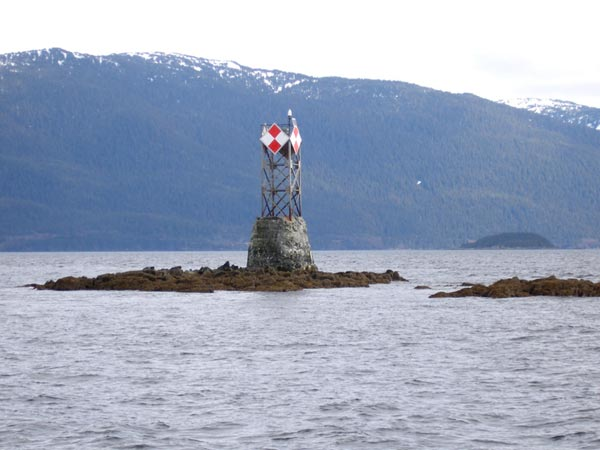
After the wreck of Princess Sophia, a navigational beacon was placed and maintained on Vanderbilt Reef.

=== Vanderbilt Reef ===
Ahead of Sophia lay a rock called Vanderbilt Reef, the tip of an underwater mountain that rose 1,000 ft (305 m) from the bottom of Lynn Canal. At high tide the rock might be awash or almost invisible under swells. At low tide it looked like a low table, with its highest point standing 12 feet (3.7 m) above the water at extreme low tide. At the time, Vanderbilt Reef was at extreme high tide and was unlit. The channel at this point was about 6.5 miles (10.5 km) wide, but the presence of the reef narrowed the main navigation channel to 2.5 miles (4.0 km) on its east side. This area, with deep waters, strong currents, rocky cliff faces, and narrow fjords is dangerous for ships. Tides regularly bring ships dangerously close to the shore. In bad weather, winds in the canal quickly become gales.

=== Navigation aids ===
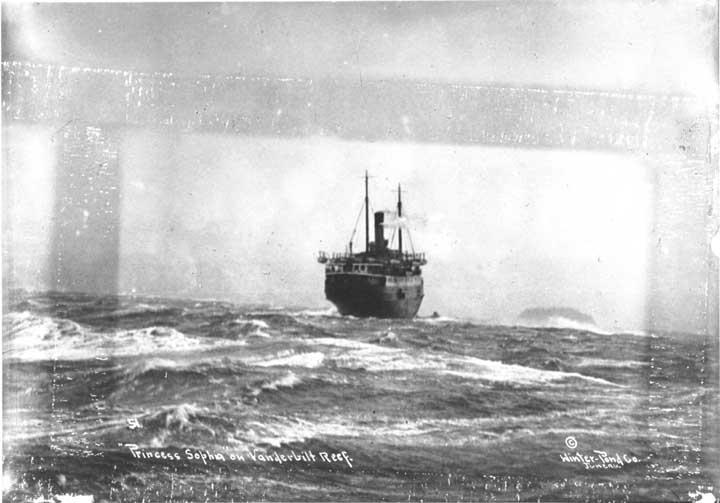
Princess Sophia on Vanderbilt Reef, Thursday, 24 October 1918. This photograph should be compared with the modern color image of the warning light on Vanderbilt Reef above in this article. The same small island appears in the distance in both images

Vanderbilt Reef itself was marked with an unlit buoy, which of course would have been invisible at night. There was a staffed lighthouse at Sentinel Island about 4 miles (6.4 km) to the south. The light station on Sentinel Island had an area of sheltered water that was used for the station's wharf. Princess Sophia passed another staffed light station at Eldred Rock, the Eldred Rock Light, 30 miles south of Skagway. Keepers at both light stations kept weather logs, which became useful later in reconstructing the events of the next two days. The dock at Sentinel Island was used as a staging point by the vessels attempting rescue of the Princess Sophia on 24 and 25 October 1918.

=== Grounding ===
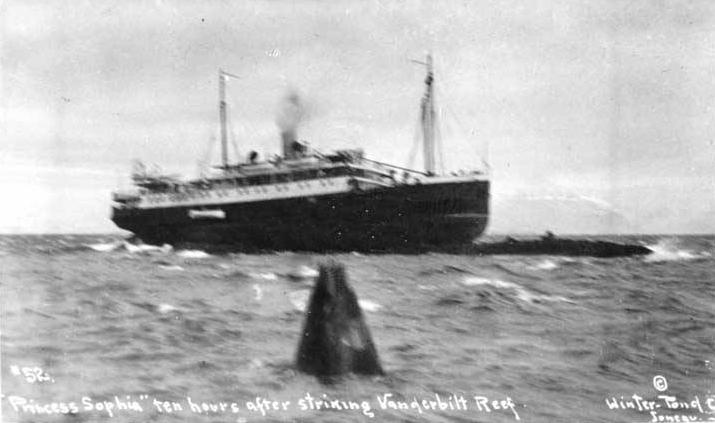
Princess Sophia grounded on Vanderbilt Reef, 24 October 1918, showing the navigation buoy. When this photograph was taken, enough rescue vessels had arrived to take off all the passengers and crew of Princess Sophia

Heading south through Lynn Canal, Princess Sophia drifted about 1.25 miles (2 km) off course, and at 02:00 on 24 October 1918, Princess Sophia struck ground hard on Vanderbilt Reef, 54 miles (87 km) south of Skagway. A letter later recovered from the body of a passenger, Signal Corps Private Auris W. McQueen, described the scene on board just after the grounding: "Two women fainted and one of them got herself into a black evening dress and didn't worry about who saw her putting it on. Some of the men, too, kept life preservers on for an hour or so and seemed to think there was no chance for us."

=== First distress call sent ===
The Wireless operator on Princess Sophia sent out a distress call immediately. Wireless was weak in those days. The distress signal could not reach much farther than Juneau. The message did reach Juneau however, and by 2:15am the local CPR shipping agent was awakened with the news. He immediately began organizing a rescue flotilla from the boats in the harbor.

=== Stranded on the reef ===
High tide came at 06:00 on 24 October. The wind had lessened, but Princess Sophia was still stuck fast on the reef. Low tide came at about noon. The wind and waves forced Princess Sophia even farther up onto the reef, but fortunately the vessel's double hull was not breached. At low tide on the reef the entire hull of Princess Sophia was completely out of the water. The barometer was rising, which indicated a possible improvement in the weather. With the next high tide at 16:00, and the seas so rough that any evacuation would be hazardous, Locke chose to wait to see if he could get the vessel off. This proved impossible. Without a tug, or more likely two or three tugs, Princess Sophia could never be taken off the reef. Worse yet, the passengers could not be evacuated from the vessel without life-threatening danger. At low tide Princess Sophia was surrounded on both sides by exposed rock. At high tide, the rock was awash, but the swells were such that a lifeboat would strike the rocks as the waves pounded up and down.

=== Similar wrecks ===
While there had been many shipwrecks and groundings over the years, and it was the rare vessel that did not run aground or have some problem of this nature, two shipwrecks would have been foremost in the minds of Captain Locke and his officers, as well as other senior captains and officers among the rescue vessels, like Captains Ledbetter of Cedar and Miller of King & Winge. These two wrecks, of Clallam in 1904 and Princess May in 1910, showed well the dilemma faced by Captain Locke in making a decision whether to evacuate Princess Sophia.

In fine weather and smooth seas on 5 August 1910, Princess May, another CPR steamship, grounded on Sentinel Island within sight of Vanderbilt Reef. All aboard were evacuated to the nearby light station, and the vessel itself was later removed from the rock with relatively minor damage. It was Princess May that CPR dispatched on hearing of the grounding of Princess Sophia to pick up her passengers who they presumed would be soon evacuated. While Princess May's grounding had been in early August, and not late October, still there were other vessels with the Princess Sophia and the stranded ship seemed to be secure.

The disaster of Clallam showed the dangers of a premature evacuation of people from a vessel into lifeboats. Clallam, a new vessel when she foundered, was sunk in a storm on what should have been an ordinary voyage across the Strait of Juan de Fuca to Victoria, British Columbia. Clallam (168 feet, 657 tons), was a smaller vessel than Sophia and built of wood. Like Princess Sophia, Clallam was driven by a single propeller turned by a compound steam engine. En route to Victoria on 8 January 1904, Clallam, under the command of Captain George Roberts, encountered severe weather conditions. At about 3:30 p.m., with water rising on board apparently from a broken porthole and improper pumping procedures, Clallam seemed as if it would soon sink. Captain Roberts ordered the lifeboats lowered, and into them placed mostly women and children. All three boats capsized or failed to properly launch, drowning all 54 people aboard them. Clallam stayed afloat long enough for rescue vessels to reach her and evacuate the people left on board.

=== Decision not to evacuate ===
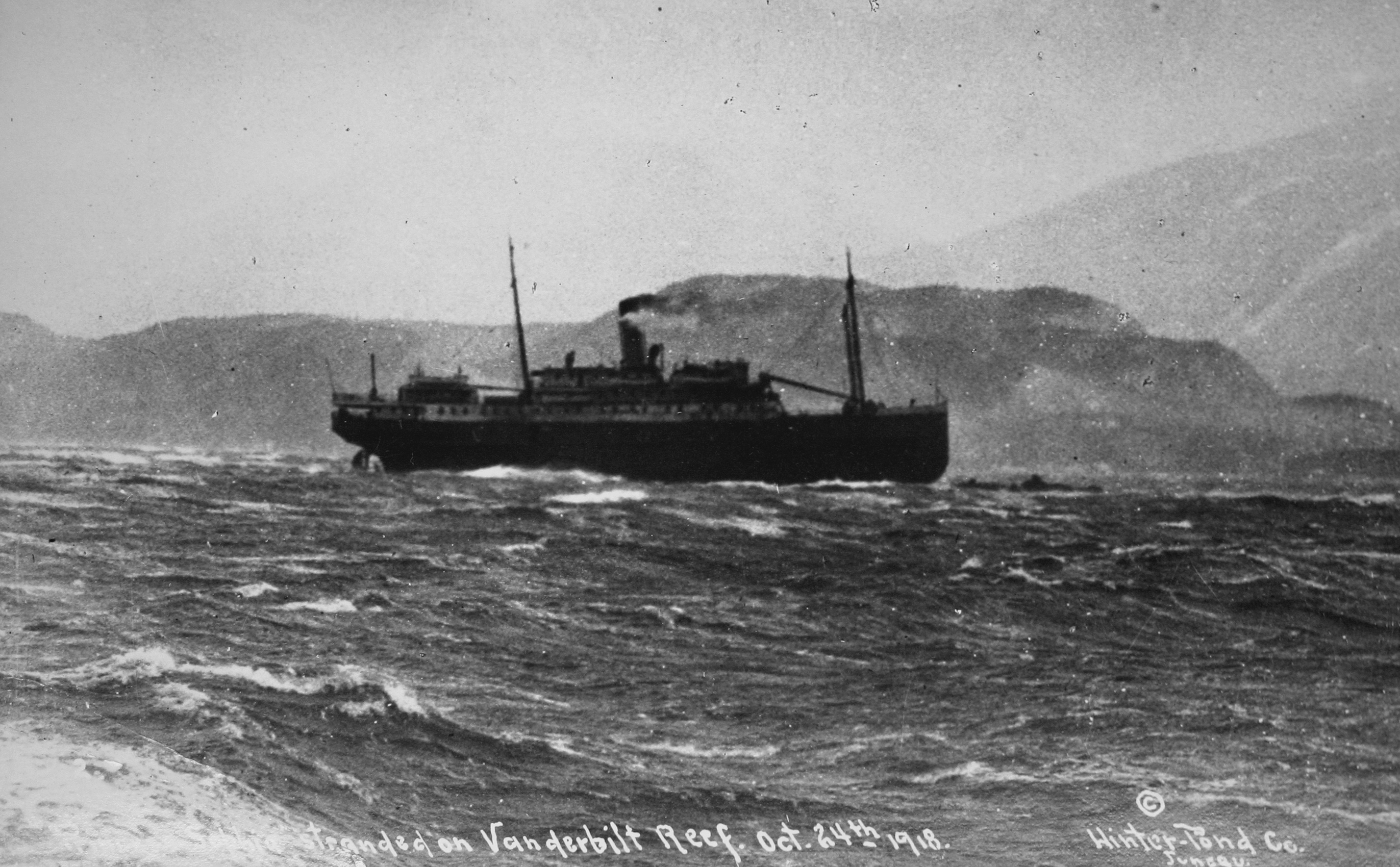
Princess Sophia, 24 October 1918, probably in the afternoon, looking in a northeasterly direction. The strength of the wind can be gauged by the way the column of smoke is blowing straight south right out of the funnel

Locke warned off James Davis, captain of the fishing vessel Estebeth, who attempted and then abandoned an effort to reach Sophia in a skiff. Davis moored his vessel by tying up to the Vanderbilt Reef marker buoy, which was then in the lee of Princess Sophia and protected from the worst force of the weather. The desperation of the situation was obvious to Davis and the other captains of the small boats at the scene. Princess Sophia had been seriously damaged striking the reef, with a hole in her bow that water ran in and out of at a rate that Davis estimated at 200 or 300 gallons per minute. With no apparent way to evacuate passengers, and Princess Sophia stuck fast on the reef, the only thing that Davis and the other rescue boats could do was to wait to see if the weather would moderate enough to attempt an evacuation. Captain Locke, of Sophia was confident enough of his own vessel's safety to tell, via megaphone, Estebeth and Amy, which were taking a pounding in the weather, that Sophia was safe and they should take shelter in a harbor.

Capt. J. W. Ledbetter, commander of the United States Lighthouse Service lighthouse tender USLHT Cedar, performing United States Navy World War I service as the patrol vessel USS Cedar at the time, did not receive word of the grounding until 14:00 on 24 October. Then 66 nautical miles (122 km; 76 mi) away, Ledbetter got in wireless contact with Captain Locke and set out with his ship to the rescue. Ledbetter asked Captain Locke if he wanted to try to evacuate some of the passengers that night. Locke told Ledbetter that the wind and the tide were too strong and it would be better for the rescue ships to anchor and wait until daylight. When Ledbetter arrived at 20:00 on 24 October he found three large vessels, including the fishing schooner King and Winge which had arrived at 18:20 and about fifteen smaller fishing vessels at the scene, arriving towards the evening on the 24th.

Meanwhile, wireless reports of the grounding had reached James W. Troup, superintendent of CPR steamship operations in Victoria. He and other CPR officials were initially not too alarmed. It appeared that the passengers would be taken off soon, and the question would be one of finding accommodation for them ashore.

=== Communications problems ===
Cable communications to Alaska had been lost on 21 October 1918, and partly as a result of this, the wireless operators were having to contend with a rush of messages, which made it difficult to transmit essential messages relating to the grounding of Princess Sophia. Efforts to clear non-essential traffic were frustrated by the international character of the disaster. Word of the grounding only reached Cedar eleven hours after the grounding. Whether this was because Cedar was out of range or because wireless channels were jammed with non-essential traffic is not clear. The delay was unfortunate, as Cedar was the largest all-weather ship in the area, which could readily have taken on all of Princess Sophia's passengers and crew. No one knows what Cedar might have been able to do had she been alerted earlier. The delay could have been significant, as the late notice to him was still well recalled 45 years later by Captain Ledbetter. Of all the rescue ships, only Cedar had wireless, and her not being on the scene earlier deprived the rescue effort of this resource, if no other.

=== Rescue effort begins Friday morning ===
Ledbetter, having the only ship with wireless, and thereby able to keep in ready contact with Princess Sophia, organized the rescue effort. The rescue plan, although dangerous, and perhaps even desperate, was to wait until high tide at 5:00 covered the reef with at least a few feet of water. This it was hoped would be enough to launch Sophia's boats and use them to take the people from Princess Sophia to the rescue ships. Cedar had anchored in the lee of a nearby island for the night. King and Winge, under captain J.J. Miller, had circled Princess Sophia all night, the only vessel to do so. On arrival at 20:00 on Thursday, Ledbetter ordered searchlights shined on Princess Sophia. What he saw convinced him that no boats could be then launched. Waves were breaking hard against the trapped steamship's hull, and the wind was rising. Meanwhile, the stranded ship remained fixed firmly in the grip of the rocks. Ledbetter, Miller, and Locke all agreed that the passengers would be safer aboard Princess Sophia and postponed any attempt to take them off by boat.

=== Rising winds force abandonment ===
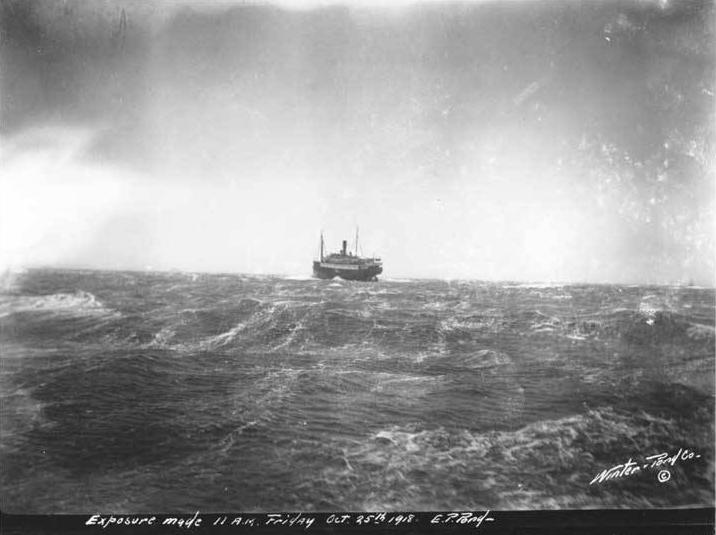
Princess Sophia on Vanderbilt Reef, 11:00 hrs, 25 October 1918

By 09:00 on 25 October, the wind was rising towards gale strength. Ledbetter was having difficulty keeping Cedar on station, and the smaller rescue boats that had run for shelter on the evening of 24 October were unable to return to the reef. Ledbetter decided he would try to anchor Cedar about 500 yards (460 m) downwind of the reef, shoot a line to Princess Sophia (possibly using a Lyle gun), and then evacuate the passengers by breeches buoy. This would have been extremely hazardous and it would have been unlikely that over 300 people could be removed by this method, but it seemed the only thing that could be done. Ledbetter twice tried to drop anchor, but each time it failed to catch on the bottom. Locke could see this effort was failing, and radioed to Ledbetter that it was no use; they would have to wait for low tide when perhaps conditions might be better. There was nothing else that could be done.

The conditions grew steadily worse, and by about 13:00 on the 25th both Cedar and King and Winge were having difficulty keeping on station. Ledbetter radioed Locke, and asked him for permission to retire to a more protected area. Locke assented. Cedar and King and Winge then went to the lee of Sentinel Island, where Miller, captain of King and Winge, came aboard Cedar to discuss a rescue plan with Ledbetter. They agreed that King and Winge, which carried a 350-fathom (2,100 ft; 640 m) anchor cable, would anchor near the reef. Meanwhile, Cedar would stand off to windward of King and Winge, creating a "lee", that is, a calm (or at least calmer) spot by blocking out the wind with the bulk of the Cedar. Cedar would then launch her lifeboats to pick up people from Princess Sophia and ferry them to King and Winge, thus eliminating the need and the hazards of using the boats of the stranded ship. This plan however could not work unless the weather conditions improved. Given that Princess Sophia had withstood so far some heavy pounding and still remained fixed on the rock, Ledbetter and Miller felt the better course was to wait for the next day to attempt their plan.

=== Last call for assistance ===
Just as Miller was disembarking from Cedar to return to King and Winge, at 16:50 on 25 October, Princess Sophia sent out a wireless message: "Ship Foundering on Reef. Come at Once." Ledbetter immediately prepared to steam out to the reef. He signaled Miller on King and Winge to follow him with two blasts of the whistle, but Miller did not at first understand the signal. Ledbetter then drove Cedar alongside King and Winge and shouted out to Miller: "I am going out there to try to locate him. If the snow should clear up, you come out and relieve me." Miller replied: "I will give you an hour to find them."

One of the last distress messages, at 5:20pm by wireless operator David Robinson, stated, "For God's sake hurry, the water is coming into my room". Aware that Princess Sophia had weak wireless batteries, Cedar replied "We are coming. Save your batteries." Princess Sophia's operator radioed back: "Alright I will. You talk to me so I know you are coming." This was the last wireless message from Princess Sophia.

=== Search in the storm ===
Cedar left the protected harbor at Sentinel Island and was immediately blasted by the wind and blowing snow. Conditions were so bad that 500 yards (460 m) from the lighthouse, the station's light could not be seen and the foghorn could not be heard. For 30 minutes Cedar moved slowly towards Vanderbilt Reef. Green water was breaking over the bow of Cedar. Without knowing precisely where she was, the rescue ship herself was in extreme danger of running onto the reef. The chief inspector of the lighthouse service district was on board Cedar at the time. He conferred with Ledbetter and they agreed that with Cedar herself in danger, and nothing to be found in the conditions, the only thing that could done was to run for shelter. Ledbetter turned Cedar back towards Sentinel Island. Unable to see anything, he had the foghorn sounding. At Sentinel Island, Captain Miller on King and Winge heard the blasts of Cedar's foghorn, and sounded his own to guide them in.

David Leverton of the Maritime Museum of British Columbia told the CBC that the captain's barometer predicted an improvement in the weather and suggested to rescuers that they try the next day. "They had seven different rescue ships ready to come to the aid of the ship if it foundered off the reef. But what ended up happening was that it settled down on the reef" until approximately 5p.m. when it was lifted off the reef.

=== Loss of the ship ===
With no survivors and no witnesses to the actual sinking, what happened on Princess Sophia to drive her off the reef is a matter of reconstruction from the available evidence and conjecture. Based on the evidence it appears that the storm, blowing in from the north, raised water levels on the reef much higher than previously, causing the vessel to become buoyant again, but only partially so. The bow of the vessel remained on the reef, and the force of the wind and waves then spun the vessel almost completely around and washed her off the reef. Dragging across the rock ripped out the ship's bottom, so when she reached deeper water near the navigation buoy, she sank. This process, based on the evidence, seems to have taken about an hour.

There appears to have been no time for an organized evacuation. Many people wore lifejackets, and two wooden lifeboats floated away (the eight steel lifeboats sank). There were about 100 people still in their cabins when the ship sank. It is hard to know why, if the ship took half an hour to sink, so many people were below decks, but there could be many reasons. It was believed that seawater invaded the ship, the boiler exploded, buckling the deck and killing many people, but divers to the wreck have found all three boilers intact. Oil fuel spilled into the water, choking people who were trying to swim away. Sophia had been equipped with extra flotation devices, on the theory that people could cling to these in the water awaiting rescue. These were worthless, as the cold seawater would kill a swimmer long before rescue could arrive.

=== Wreck located ===
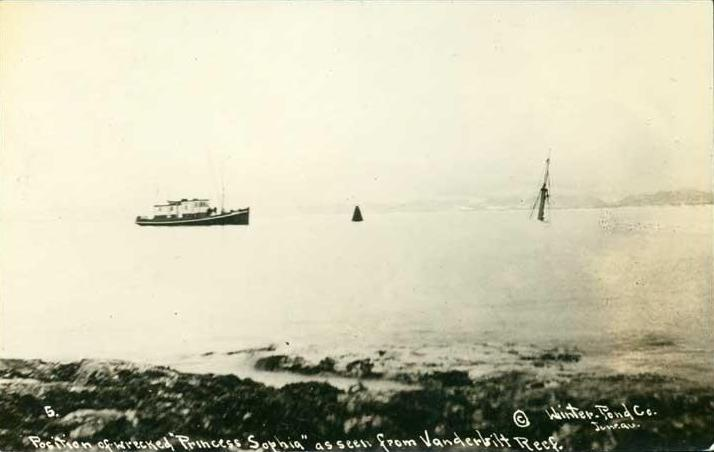
Wreck of Princess Sophia

The next morning, 26 October, it was still snowing, but the wind had died down somewhat. Cedar, King and Winge and other rescue vessels returned to the reef. Only the foremast of Princess Sophia remained above water. The rescue vessels cruised around for three hours looking for survivors. They found bodies, but no living people. King and Winge took the bodies to Juneau. Cedar also returned to Juneau. When he arrived, Captain Ledbetter sent out a wire which stated: "No sign of life. No hope of survivors."

When the watches on bodies in the water were examined, they were noted to have stopped at 5:50 p.m. The sole survivor of the wreck was an English setter dog found in Auke Bay, outside Juneau.

=== Aftermath of wreck ===
For months after the wreck, bodies washed up for as much as thirty miles to the north and south of Vanderbilt Reef. Wreckage and the passengers' belongings were also found, including toys of the children who had died on the ship. Many of the bodies were scarcely recognizable as human remains, being covered with a thick coat of oil. Among the dead was Walter Harper, the first person to reach the summit of Denali, the highest mountain in North America. Most of the bodies recovered were taken to Juneau, where many of the local citizens volunteered to help identify the remains and prepare them for burial. The bodies had to be scrubbed with gasoline to remove the oil. Teams of women prepared female bodies, and teams of men handled the males. The volunteers were particularly affected by the bodies of the children. Divers at the wreck site recovered about 100 bodies. Many were floating in cabins for months after the wreck. The families of passengers brought legal action against Canadian Pacific, but these failed.

=== Evaluation of the decision not to evacuate ===
Many people believed that the decision not to evacuate the ship was a grave error by Captain Locke, and that most or even all of the passengers could have been saved. The Ministry of Marine reached a similar conclusion in 1919 after hearing the evidence from first hand witnesses. Later, the courts ruled that right or wrong, the decision was within the reasonable range of judgment of the captain. Captain Ledbetter of Cedar stated that in his opinion, he never saw conditions that would have permitted evacuation of the ship, but he was careful, even almost 50 years later, to state that this was as far as he could tell from when he arrived at the reef, which was at 20:00 on 24 October. As early as 10:20 on 24 October there were enough rescue vessels at the reef to have accommodated all of the people on Princess Sophia, and there would be four or five hours until the wind began to rise. Also Princess Sophia had eight lifeboats built of steel, not wood, which would presumably have fared better on wave-washed rocks. On the other hand, Captain Locke could not have known the weather would worsen, and there seem to have been signs that it would improve. Historians Coates and Morrison speculate that the memory of the wreck of Clallam, when everyone in the lifeboats died after a premature abandonment of the vessel, may have played a role in Locke's decision.

=== Letters recovered from the lost passengers ===
The passengers and crew on Princess Sophia realized their extreme danger. Many wrote letters to loved ones. At least two of these were later recovered. The letter of John R. "Jack" Maskell, found on his body, was widely printed in newspapers at the time:

Shipwrecked off coast of Alaska

S.S. Princess Sophia
October 24, 1918
My own dear sweetheart,
I am writing this my dear girl while the boat is in grave danger. We struck a rock last night which threw many from their berths, women rushed out in their night attire, some were crying, some too weak to move, but the lifeboats were swung out in all readiness but owing to the storm would be madness to launch until there was no hope for the ship. Surrounding ships were notified by wireless and in three hours the first steamer came, but cannot get near owing to the storm raging and the reef which we are on. There are now seven ships near. When the tide went down, two-thirds of the boat was high and dry. We are expecting the lights to go out at any minute, also the fires. The boat might go to pieces, for the force of the waves are terrible, making awful noises on the side of the boat, which has quite a list to port. No one is allowed to sleep, but believe me dear Dorrie it might have been much worse. Just hear there is a big steamer coming. We struck the reef in a terrible snowstorm. There is a big buoy near marking the danger but the captain was to port instead [of] to starboard of [the] buoy. I made my will this morning, leaving everything to you, my own true love and I want you to give £100 to my dear Mother, £100 to my dear Dad, £100 to dear wee Jack, and the balance of my estate (about £300) to you, Dorrie dear. The Eagle Lodge will take care of my remains.
In danger at Sea.
Princess Sophia
24th October 1918
To whom it may concern:
Should anything happen [to] me notify, notify Eagle Lodge, Dawson. My insurance, finances, and property, I leave to my wife (who was to be) Miss Dorothy Burgess, 37 Smart St., Longsight, Manchester, England.

J. Maskell

Jack Maskell was buried in Vancouver's Mountain View Cemetery amidst 66 other victims of the Princess Sophia tragedy. Most lie near East 41st Avenue and Prince Edward Street in the Jones 37 section.

== Timeline ==
=== Wednesday 23 October 1918 ===
- 08:15 Snow starts falling at Sentinel Island Light Station ("LS") 58 miles south of Skagway; continues falling until 06:50 on 24 October.
- 11:10 Snow starts falling at Eldred Rock LS, 30 miles south of Skagway, continues falling until 06:00 on 24 October.
- 16:33 Sunset (at Juneau); twilight begins
- 17:14 Twilight ends (at Juneau); night begins
- 19:01 Moonrise (phase: waning gibbous (79% of Moon's visible disk illuminated))
- 22:00 Princess Sophia departs Skagway, Capt. Locke in command.
- 23:00 Sophia passes Battery Point, 16 miles south of Skagway; weather worsens, wind gusting to 50 miles per hour.

=== Thursday 24 October 1918 ===
- 02:10 Princess Sophia grounds at Vanderbilt Reef, 54 miles south of Skagway and 46 miles north of Juneau.
- 02:15 Word of stranding reaches Juneau by wireless distress call .
- 06:00 High tide on Vanderbilt reef; Sophia's hull pounds on rocks; storm lessens but vessel cannot get free; first rescue ship arrives; snowfall stops at Eldred Rock LS, 24 miles north of Vanderbilt reef; weather remains clear at this light station until 13:00.
- 06:12 Dawn twilight begins
- 06:50 Snowfall stops at Sentinel Island LS, 4 miles south of Vanderbilt Reef; weather remains clear at this light station until 12:10.
- 06:53 Sunrise
- 09:00 U.S. harbor boat Peterson arrives at Vanderbilt Reef.
- 10:00 Mailboat Estebeth arrives at Vanderbilt Reef.
- 10:20 Amy arrives at Vanderbilt Reef; rescue vessels at scene now have capacity to take off at least 385 people, more than are on board Sophia.
- 12:00 Low tide on Vanderbilt Reef
- 12:10 Snow begins falling again at Sentinel Rock LS, continues falling until 03:40 on Sunday, 27 October.
- 13:00 Snow begins falling again at Eldred Rock LS, continues falling until 08:00 on 27 October.
- 14:00 Wireless message from Juneau alerts Captain John Ledbetter, of lighthouse tender Cedar, then 66 miles south of Vanderbilt Reef; Cedar proceeds immediately to Vanderbilt Reef, arrives six hours later at 20:00.
- 15:00 Wind begins rising at Vanderbilt reef
- 15:30 Ferry boat Lone Fisherman arrives at Sentinel Island (does not proceed to reef).
- 16:00 High tide on Vanderbilt Reef; Sophia cannot break free; sea conditions rough and waves pound at hull as tide rises; when Sophia not heavily damaged, Captain Locke advises Amy and Estebeth to seek harbor; they do; Sitka arrives at reef.
- 16:30 Sunset
- 17:11 Twilight ends; night begins
- 18:20 King and Winge arrives at reef, stays on station until 13:00 on 25 October.
- 19:00 Elsinore arrives at reef.
- 20:00 Cedar arrives at reef. Wireless communication now possible between rescue vessels on scene and Sophia.
- 20:15 Moonrise (phase: waning gibbous (69% of Moon's visible disk illuminated))
- 20:30 Light and heat lost on Sophia, causes temporary belief on King and Winge that vessel has sunk. Loss of power causes loss of wireless communications.
- 19:00 Cedar departs at Vanderbilt Reef.
- 23:30 Princess Alice departs Vancouver, BC bound for Juneau to pick up passengers who are anticipated to be evacuated from Sophia.

=== Friday, 25 October 1918 ===
- 04:35 Cedar returns to Vanderbilt Reef; King and Winge has been there all night. Rescue effort postponed because of sea conditions.
- 06:14 Dawn's first light
- 06:55 Sunrise
- 08:00 Electrical power and steam heat restored on Sophia; wireless communication possible again.
- 09:00 Cedar attempts to anchor and evacuate passengers by breeches buoy. Attempt to anchor fails.
- 10:00 Locke radios Ledbetter, tells him to abandon attempt to anchor, wait until next low tide.
- 13:00 Worsening weather conditions force Cedar and King and Winge to leave the reef, after first receiving assent from Locke.
- 13:45 Cedar and King and Winge reach relatively protected water in lee of Sentinel Island. Exhausted wireless operators on Cedar and Sophia agree not to communicate until 16:30 to give themselves time to rest.
- 16:47 Sunset
- 16:50 Sophia radios Cedar: "Ship foundering on reef. Come at once." Cedar proceeds to area of Vanderbilt Reef, but cannot locate the vessel.
- 17:09 Twilight ends; night begins
- 17:20 Last wireless message from Sophia
- 17:50 Most watches recovered from Sophia victims stop. It is presumed that by this time, Sophia had sunk and the victims were forced into the water. No one on board survives.

=== Saturday, 26 October 1918 ===
- 06:16 Dawn's first light
- 06:58 Sunrise
- 07:21 Cedar departs Sentinel Island to return to reef to search.
- 08:30 Cedar arrives at reef and sees only the foremast of Sophia above the water on south side of reef.

== See also ==
- Lulu Mae Johnson, died during the tragedy
- Princess fleet
