= USFS Auklet =

American fishery patrol vessel

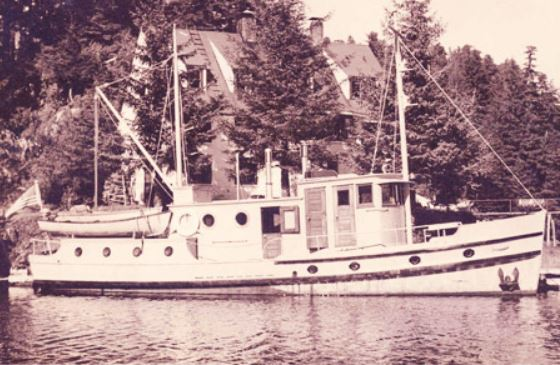
- USFS Auklet at Little Port Walter in Port Walter, Territory of Alaska.

U.S. Bureau of Fisheries
- Name: USFS Auklet
- Namesake: Auklet, a seabird of the genus Aethia
- Builder: Elliott Bay Yacht and Engine Company, Seattle, Washington
- Acquired: 10 May 1917
- Commissioned: Summer 1917
- Identification: WTFA
- Fate: Transferred to U.S. Fish and Wildlife Service 30 June 1940

U.S. Fish and Wildlife Service
- Name: US FWS Auklet
- Namesake: Previous name retained
- Acquired: From U.S. Bureau of Fisheries 30 June 1940
- Fate: Sold autumn 1950

General characteristics
- Type: Fishery patrol vessel
- Tonnage: 25 GRT; 17 NRT
- Length: 48 ft (15 m)
- Beam: 12 ft 6 in (3.8 m)
- Draft: 5 ft 3 in (1.6 m)
- Propulsion: As built: 25 hp (19 kW) Frisco Standard gasoline engine, 600 US gal (2,300 L) gasoline, plus small sails for emergency propulsion; By 1922: 40 hp (30 kW) Frisco Standard gasoline engine
- Speed: 8.5 knots (15.7 km/h; 9.8 mph)
- Range: 3,000 nmi (5,600 km; 3,500 mi)
- Crew: Three, plus two embarked fishery agents

USFS Auklet was an American fishery patrol vessel that served in the waters of Southeast Alaska. She was in commission in the United States Bureau of Fisheries from 1917 to 1940 and in the U.S. Fish and Wildlife Service as US FWS Auklet from 1940 to 1950.

== Construction ==
In 1916, the United States Congress appropriated $10,000 to the United States Bureau of Fisheries (BOF) for the construction of two fishery patrol vessels for service in the waters of Southeast Alaska. Martin C. Erismann designed the vessels as identical sister ships and patterned them after the highly seaworthy design of salmon purse seiners. Built out of Douglas fir, they had a raised deck forward of the pilot house that dropped moving aft, a raised deck house amidships which had an overhanging roof that covered the deck, and a small afterdeck at the stern. The sides extended upward to create the walls of the after cabin. Each boat had a 25-horsepower (19 kW) Frisco-Standard gasoline engine and comfortable accommodations for two fishery agents and a crew of three.

Construction bids for the two vessels opened in Seattle, Washington, on 5 December 1916 and the project attracted seven bids. Ultimately, the BOF signed a contract to build the vessels with the Elliott Bay Yacht and Engine Company of Seattle. Construction began immediately. After the two boats were completed and inspected, the BOF accepted both boats, USFS Auklet and USFS Murre, on 10 May 1917. The total cost of designing, building, and inspecting the two boats came to US$9,702.70. They were the first vessels ever constructed for fisheries enforcement duties in Alaska.

== Operational history ==
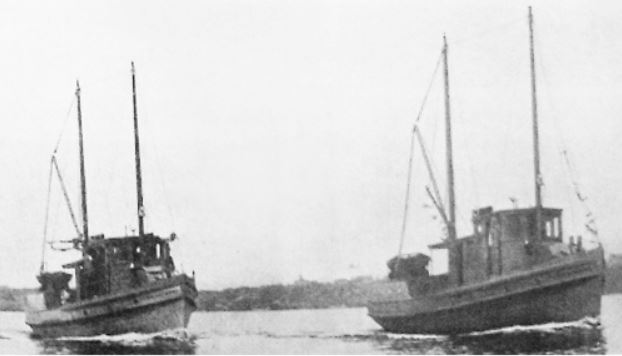
USFS Auklet and USFS Murre, from Pacific Motor Boat, June 1917.

The BOF commissioned both Auklet and Murre in the summer of 1917. On 4 July 1917, a dedication ceremony took place in Seattle to mark the opening of the Government Locks, which connected Puget Sound with the Lake Washington Ship Canal and Lake Washington, and Auklet was part of a flotilla of hundreds of boats that followed the BOF steamer Roosevelt as Roosevelt became the first large ocean-going vessel to enter the canal. Auklet and Murre departed Seattle on 7 July 1917 bound for Wrangell, Territory of Alaska. After they arrived, they took up their patrol duties in the waters of Southeast Alaska.

On 12 September 1918, Auklet suffered substantial damage to her deckhouse while moored at Juneau in the Territory of Alaska when the Canadian passenger liner SS Princess Sophia struck her. On 25 October 1918, Princess Sophia sank with the loss of all 343 people on board after grounding on Vanderbilt Reef in Lynn Canal near Juneau; it was the worst maritime disaster in the combined history of Alaska and British Columbia. Auklet joined Murre and the BOF fishery patrol vessel USFS Osprey in a fruitless search for survivors that lasted into November 1918.

In addition to performing their primary duty of fishery patrols in the waters of Southeast Alaska, Auklet and Murre often engaged in other activities. They assisted the United States Department of War in inspecting active and abandoned fish traps as possible navigational obstructions, and took part in routine stream improvements, which involved the removal of impediments to salmon – such as log jams and beaver dams – as they ascended to their spawning grounds. Auklet also provided transportation to BOF personnel and hauled supplies to settlements and BOF stations in Southeast Alaska, and during a steamship strike in 1920 she transported foodstuffs from Prince Rupert, British Columbia, Canada, to merchants in Wrangell and Ketchikan, Alaska. After Murre struck a rock in Alaska's Keku Strait on 1 April 1920 and was beached to prevent her from sinking, Auklet arrived on the scene and towed Murre to Wrangell for repairs.

In September 1920, Auklet and Murre conducted stream-marking, and in 1921 they began a program of annual springtime patrolling of sealing grounds near Sitka, Territory of Alaska, during fur seal migrations. In 1921 Auklet made a voyage to Seattle for repairs and overhauling with USFS Osprey in tow; Osprey was to be sold at public auction after arriving in Seattle. On her return voyage to the Territory of Alaska she towed the newly acquired BOF patrol vessel USFS Petrel.

By 1922, both Auklet and Murre had had their original engines replaced with heavier, 40-horsepower (30 kW) Frisco-Standard gasoline engines that gave them additional power they needed to deal with the high winds and seas they frequently encountered in the waters of the Territory of Alaska. In February 1928, both boats had water heating systems installed at Juneau, and later in 1928 each boat had her galley enlarged to increase the comfort of crew and passengers.

In 1934, Auklet took part in a Civil Works Administration project to clear log jams and other obstructions in salmon streams that were blocking the fish from reaching their spawning grounds. In 1936, she participated in the construction of a 70-foot (21 m) concrete fish ladder at the rapids of the Pavlof Harbor headwaters on Chichagof Island in the Alexander Archipelago of the Alaska Panhandle.

In 1939, the Bureau of Fisheries was transferred from the United States Department of Commerce to the United States Department of the Interior, and on 30 June 1940, it merged with the Interior Department's Division of Biological Survey to form the new Fish and Wildlife Service (FWS) as an element of the Interior Department. Via this reorganization, Auklet became part of the fleet of the new FWS as US FWS Auklet in 1940.

In the late 1940s, Auklet was engaged in salmon hunting and trapping winter patrol work, and she was scheduled to conduct the FWS′s first downstream fish migration research in early 1949. She was sold in the autumn of 1950.
