= Princess Alice =

Princess Alice may refer to:

== People ==
- Princess Alice of the United Kingdom (1843–1878), third child and second daughter of Queen Victoria
- Princess Alice of Bourbon-Parma (born 1849) (1849–1935), daughter of Charles III, Duke of Parma, and Princess Louise d'Artois
- Princess Alice, Countess of Athlone (1883–1981), a member of the British royal family, last surviving grandchild of Queen Victoria
- Princess Alice of Battenberg (1885–1969), great-granddaughter of Queen Victoria, mother of Prince Philip, Duke of Edinburgh, and mother-in-law of Queen Elizabeth II
- Princess Alice, Duchess of Gloucester (1901–2004), wife of Prince Henry, Duke of Gloucester
- Princess Alicia of Bourbon-Parma (1917–2017), daughter of Elias, Duke of Parma, and Archduchess Maria Anna of Austria

== Other uses ==
- SS Princess Alice, multiple ships with the name
- Princess Alice Bank, a submerged seamount in the Azores
