= Point Sherman Light =

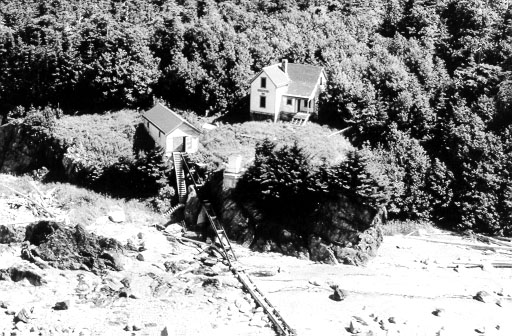
- The old Point Sherman Light
- Location: Point Sherman; Lynn Canal; Alaska; United States
- Coordinates: 58.853126°N 135.151531°W

Tower
- Constructed: 1904 (first)
- Foundation: concrete blocks
- Construction: wooden tower (first)
- Automated: 1981
- Height: 42 feet (13 m) (first); 20 feet (6.1 m) (current)
- Shape: hexagonal tower (first) lamppost with two day marker and light (current)
- Markings: white tower (first)
- Operator: Tongass National Forest

Light
- First lit: 1981 (current)
- Deactivated: reduced to minor light in 1917 and discontinued in 1932
- Lens: Fresnel lens
- Characteristic: F W

The Point Sherman Light was a lighthouse located 38 miles (61 km) north of Juneau, Alaska, along the east side of Lynn Canal, eight miles (13 km) south of Eldred Rock Light. It is no longer standing.

== History ==
Construction was completed in 1904 and the light was first lit on October 18, 1904. The original light was reduced to a minor light shortly before 1917. In 1932, the station was transferred to the Forest Service and replaced by a nearby buoy. A dayboard and a light were placed on the site of the original light in 1981.

== See also ==
- List of lighthouses in the United States
