= Lulu Mae Johnson =

Canadian dance-hall performer and hotelier (1877–1918)

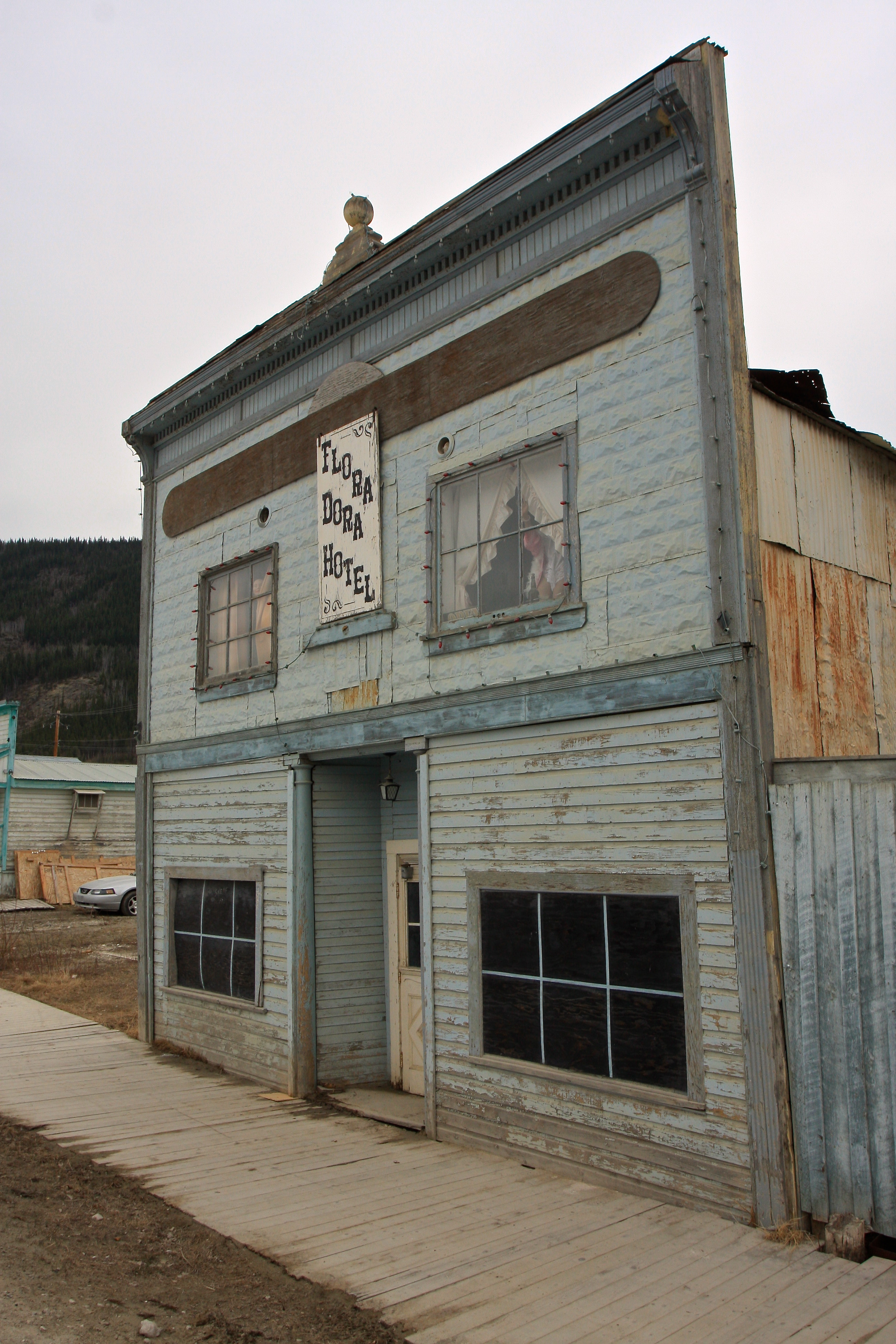
The now-abandoned Flora Dora Hotel, photographed in 2013.

Lulu Mae Johnson (c. 1877 – October 25, 1918) was a dance-hall performer and hotelier in Dawson City, Yukon, Canada.

Johnson arrived in the Yukon in 1899 or 1900, probably from Alabama. She may have arrived with a dance troupe or with a trumpet player. Johnson married her employer, Murray S. Eads, in 1904 and went on to manage his dance-hall, the Flora Dora. Although she was once charged with "allowing women of loose, idle or suspicious character on the premises for the purpose of keeping company with men" she and her husband were well respected in Dawson City.

In 1918 the couple left Dawson City. They sold their business and traveled south. Johnson and Eads both died on their journey when the SS Princess Sophia sank, killing all aboard.
