= Eldred Rock =

Island in Juneau, Alaska, United States

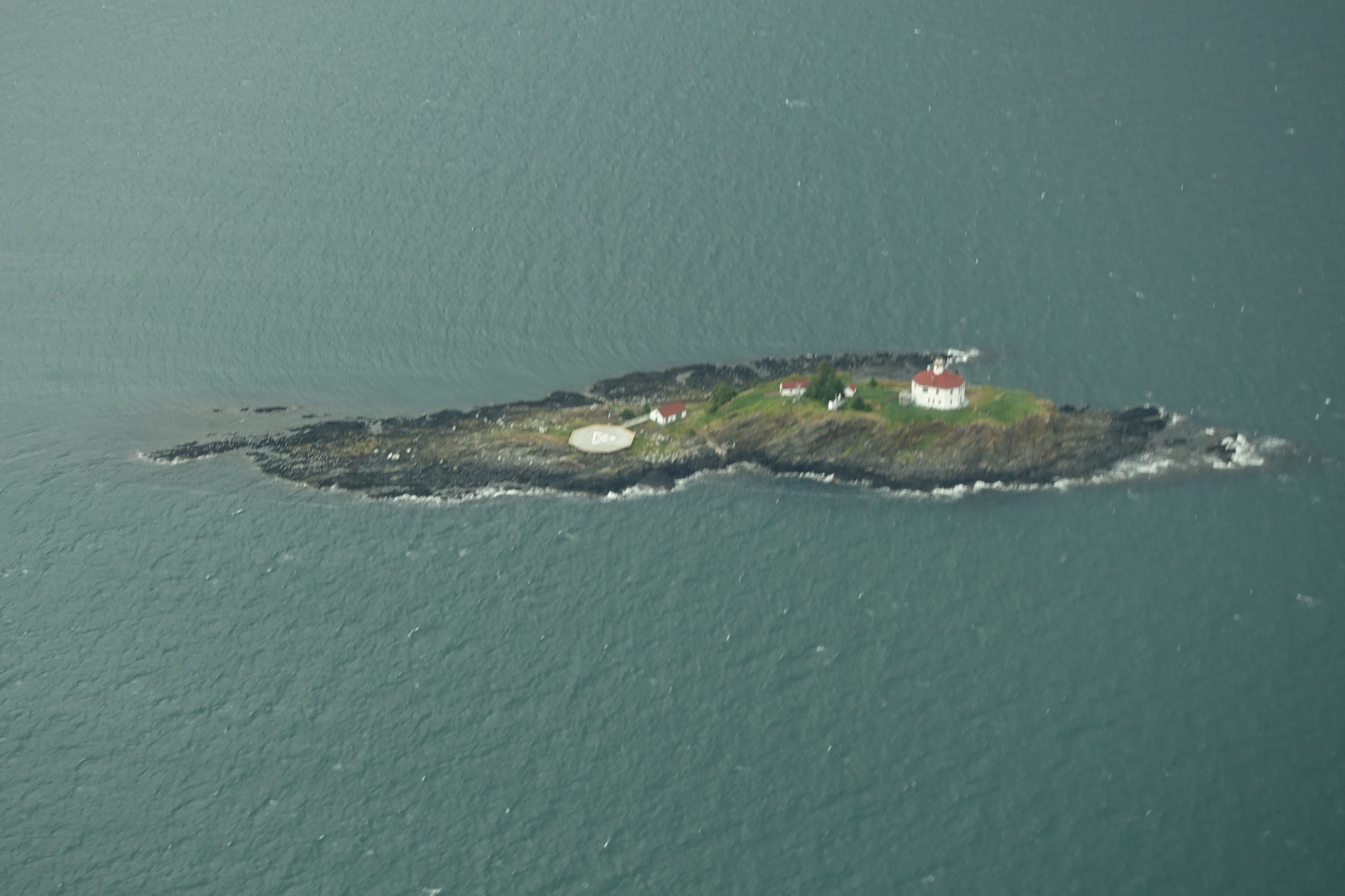
- Eldred Rock and the lighthouse

- Location within Alaska

Geography
- Location: Juneau City and Borough, Alaska; Haines Borough, Alaska
- Coordinates: 58°58′18″N 135°13′15″W
- Archipelago: Alexander Archipelago
- Adjacent to: Lynn Canal
- Highest elevation: 0 ft (0 m)

Administration
- United States
- State: Alaska
- Borough: Juneau City and Borough
- Borough: Haines Borough

Eldred Rock (also known as Nechraje) is an island in the boroughs of Juneau and Haines, Alaska, United States. Located in Lynn Canal, it is 2.7 miles (4.3 km) southeast of Kataguni Island and 55 miles (89 km) northwest of the city of Juneau. This island is the site of the Eldred Rock Light, a lighthouse built in 1905 and staffed until the United States Coast Guard automated its operation in 1973.

The Eldred Rock Coast Guard Heliport is also located on the island.

== Wrecks and incidents ==
Eldred Rock has been the location of multiple maritime incidents. One of the earliest involved the Hassler, the Coast Guard's first iron-hulled steamship. After being decommissioned, the vessel was sold to the McGuire Brothers for $15,700 and renamed the Clara Nevada. She sailed from Seattle, Washington, on January 26, 1898, with a crew of 40 men bound for Skagway, Alaska and 165 passengers heading for the Klondike gold fields. Late on February 5, 1898, the Clara Nevada left Skagway with between 25 and 40 passengers aboard. During the night she struck an uncharted rock several hundred yards north of Eldred Rock and sank immediately. There were no survivors.

A tour boat struck the island on June 24, 2002, but later made its way safely to Haines.

== Climate ==
Eldred Rock has a subarctic climate (Köppen Dfc).

Climate data for Eldred Rock, Alaska (1940-1968 normals and extremes)
Month	Jan	Feb	Mar	Apr	May	Jun	Jul	Aug	Sep	Oct	Nov	Dec	Year
Record high °F (°C)	60 (16)	51 (11)	53 (12)	64 (18)	74 (23)	82 (28)	85 (29)	86 (30)	79 (26)	60 (16)	52 (11)	68 (20)	86 (30)
Mean daily maximum °F (°C)	28.6 (−1.9)	33.7 (0.9)	36.2 (2.3)	44.1 (6.7)	51.8 (11.0)	59.6 (15.3)	62.5 (16.9)	60.7 (15.9)	54.6 (12.6)	46.1 (7.8)	38.0 (3.3)	32.6 (0.3)	45.7 (7.6)
Daily mean °F (°C)	24.6 (−4.1)	29.6 (−1.3)	32.1 (0.1)	39.6 (4.2)	46.6 (8.1)	54.1 (12.3)	57.2 (14.0)	55.7 (13.2)	49.9 (9.9)	41.9 (5.5)	34.0 (1.1)	28.7 (−1.8)	41.2 (5.1)
Mean daily minimum °F (°C)	20.6 (−6.3)	25.5 (−3.6)	27.9 (−2.3)	35.2 (1.8)	41.4 (5.2)	48.5 (9.2)	51.8 (11.0)	50.7 (10.4)	45.3 (7.4)	37.6 (3.1)	30.0 (−1.1)	24.8 (−4.0)	36.6 (2.6)
Record low °F (°C)	−9 (−23)	−3 (−19)	−5 (−21)	10 (−12)	30 (−1)	33 (1)	28 (−2)	38 (3)	23 (−5)	16 (−9)	1 (−17)	−20 (−29)	−20 (−29)
Average precipitation inches (mm)	2.97 (75)	4.41 (112)	2.66 (68)	2.01 (51)	2.52 (64)	1.96 (50)	2.49 (63)	3.90 (99)	6.23 (158)	7.72 (196)	5.27 (134)	4.30 (109)	46.44 (1,180)
Average snowfall inches (cm)	16.5 (42)	14.1 (36)	15.4 (39)	1.3 (3.3)	0.1 (0.25)	0.0 (0.0)	0.0 (0.0)	0.0 (0.0)	0.0 (0.0)	0.7 (1.8)	7.7 (20)	15.2 (39)	71.1 (181)
Average precipitation days (≥ 0.01 in)	12	14	14	12	13	9	12	14	17	20	16	17	171
Source: WRCC
