= Çıkaran =

History
- Name: Moorstone 1919-51; Kurtaran 1951-62; Çıkaran 1962-2010
- Operator: Royal Navy 1919-51; M.Azmi Alpmen 1951-62; M.Taviloglu 1962-1978; Nazim Colak ve Ortagi, Istanbul 1978–2010
- Port of registry: Royal Navy; (Turkey) Istanbul
- Builder: Bow, McLachlan & Co, Paisley, Scotland
- Yard number: 380
- Launched: 12 November 1919
- In service: 1919
- Identification: IMO number 5072773; call sign TCCI
- Fate: Deleted 12 July 2010

General characteristics
- Class & type: Moor class
- Type: mooring & salvage tug
- Tonnage: 459 tons GRT
- Length: 139 ft 5 in (42.49 m)
- Beam: 29 ft 1 in (8.86 m)
- Installed power: triple-expansion steam engine
- Propulsion: screw

Çıkaran is a Moor-class mooring and salvage tug. Bow, McLachlan and Company of Paisley in Renfrewshire, Scotland built her for the Royal Navy, who commissioned her as HMDYC Moorstone in 1919. In 1948, she was decommissioned and in 1951, she was sold to civilian owners in Turkey, who renamed her Kurtaran. In 1962, she was sold again and her new owners named her Çıkaran. She was deleted from the register on 12 July 2010.
