= SS Princess Adelaide =

Ocean liner (1910–1967)

- SS Princess Adelaide

History
- Name: 1910–1949: SS Princess Adelaide; 1949–1967: SS Angelika
- Owner: 1911–1949: Canadian Pacific; 1949–1967: Typaldos Lines
- Builder: Fairfield
- Launched: 5 July 1910
- In service: 1910
- Out of service: 1967
- Fate: Scrapped 1967

General characteristics
- Type: Ocean liner
- Installed power: 4000 HP at 130RPM

SS Princess Adelaide was a passenger vessel in the coastal service fleet of the Canadian Pacific Railway (CPR) during the first half of the 20th century.

This ship was called a "pocket liner" because she offered amenities like a great ocean liner, but on a smaller scale. The ship was part of the CPR "Princess fleet," which was composed of ships having names which began with the title "Princess". Along with SS Princess Alice, SS Princess Mary, and SS Princess Sophia, SS Princess Adelaide was one of four similar ships built for CPR during 1910–1911.

== History ==
SS Princess Adelaide was built by Fairfield Shipbuilding and Engineering Company, Govan, Scotland for the Canadian Pacific Railway.

The 3,061-ton vessel had length of 290.5 feet (88.5 m), breadth of 46.1 feet (14.1 m), and depth of 15.03 feet (4.58 m).

SS Princess Adelaide was added to the active roster of the CPR fleet in 1910.

In 1949, the ship was sold to a Greek firm (Typaldos Lines) and renamed SS Angelika. She was scrapped in 1967.

== See also ==
- CP Ships
- List of ocean liners
- List of ships in British Columbia
