= HMS Bootle (1918) =

Minesweeper of the Royal Navy

History

United Kingdom
- Name: Bootle
- Builder: Bow, McLachlan and Company, Paisley, Scotland
- Launched: 11 June 1918
- Fate: Sold 21 February 1923 to Alloa S Bkg Co. Arrived Charlestown for break up 18 April 1923

General characteristics
- Class & type: Hunt-class minesweeper, Aberdare sub-class
- Displacement: 710 tons
- Length: 231 ft (70 m)
- Beam: 28 ft (8.5 m)
- Draught: 8 ft (2.4 m)
- Propulsion: Yarrow-type boilers, Vertical triple-expansion engines, 2 shafts, 2,200 ihp (1,600 kW)
- Speed: max 16 knots (30 km/h; 18 mph)
- Range: 140 tons coal
- Complement: 73
- Armament: 1 × QF 4 in (102 mm) forward; 76 mm (3.0 in) aft; 2 × twin 0.303 in (7.7 mm) machine guns

HMS Bootle was a Hunt-class minesweeper of the Royal Navy from World War I. She was originally to be named Buckie, but this was changed to avoid any conflict between the vessel name and a coastal location.

== See also ==
- Bootle, Lancashire
