= SS Princess Mary =

Canadian passenger vessel

- SS Princess Mary on February 14, 1915

History

Canada
- Name: SS Princess Mary
- Owner: Canadian Pacific Railway Coast Service, 1911–1954:
- Builder: Bow, McLachlan & Co, Paisley
- In service: 1910
- Out of service: 1952
- Fate: Converted to barge; Lost April 15, 1954

General characteristics
- Type: Ocean liner
- Tonnage: 2,155-ton
- Length: 248.4 ft (75.7 m)
- Beam: 40.1 ft (12.2 m)
- Draught: 14.0 ft (4.3 m)

SS Princess Mary was a passenger vessel in the coastal service fleet of the Canadian Pacific Railway (CPR) during the first half of the 20th century.

This ship was called a "pocket liner" because she offered amenities like a great ocean liner, but on a smaller scale. The ship was part of the CPR "Princess fleet," which was composed of ships having names which began with the title "Princess". Along with the SS Princess Adelaide the SS Princess Alice and the SS Princess Sophia, the SS Princess Mary was one of four similar ships built for CPR during 1910–11.

== History ==
Princess Mary was built by Bow, McLachlan and Company of Paisley, Scotland for the Canadian Pacific Railway. The 2,155-ton vessel had length of 248.4 feet (75.7 m), breadth of 40.1 feet (12.2 m), and depth of 14.0 feet (4.3 m) She was added to the active roster of the CPR fleet in 1910.

On March 14, 1911, the Princess Mary made her first trip on the Nanaimo-Comox–Vancouver service.

A highlight of Princess Mary′s service occurred on February 15, 1915, when the 30th Battalion of the Canadian Expeditionary Force (CEF) embarked on her at Victoria, British Columbia, to begin its journey to Europe for World War I service.

In 1952, Princess Mary was removed from the active service list. She was converted into a 240-foot (73.2 m) barge. While under tow by the Canadian tug Chelan from Skagway, Territory of Alaska, to Vancouver with a cargo of silver, lead, and zinc ore concentrates, she was lost when Chelan sank on April 15, 1954, with the loss of all 14 people aboard off the entrance to Sumner Strait approximately 4 nautical miles (7.4 km; 4.6 mi) west of Cape Decision in Southeast Alaska.

When she was converted into a barge, part of Princess Mary′s superstructure was beached on Harbour Road in West Victoria, British Columbia, across the street from the Point Hope Shipyard. The superstructure became the Princess Mary Restaurant, which later moved to a different location in West Victoria. Plans were made to save the vacated superstructure and move it to Powell River, British Columbia, but the move never took place. In 2011, the superstructure was torn down to make room for development.

== See also ==
- CP Ships
- List of ocean liners
- List of ships in British Columbia
