= Bow, McLachlan and Company =

Bow, McLachlan and Company was a Scottish marine engineering and shipbuilding company that traded between 1872 and 1932.

== History ==
=== 1872–1914 ===
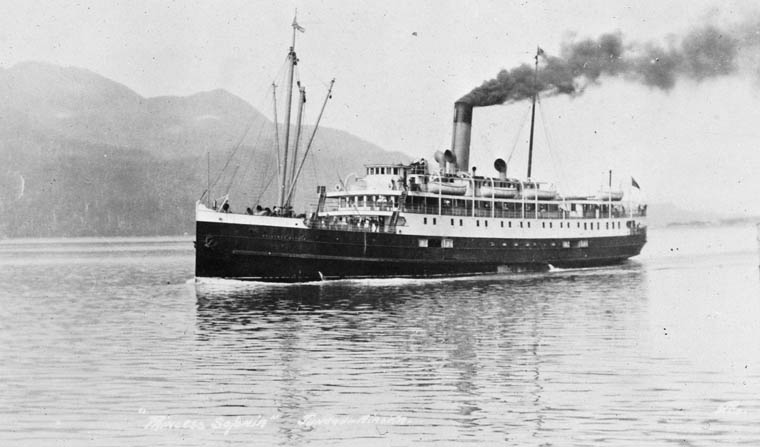
Canadian Pacific "pocket liner" Princess Sophia (1912)

In 1872 William Bow and John McLachlan founded the company at Abbotsinch, Renfrewshire, where it made steering gear and light marine steam engines. In 1900 the company expanded into the building of small ships by taking over J. McArthur & Co's Thistle Works and shipyard at Paisley, also in Renfrewshire. The expanded undertaking became a limited liability company at the same time.

Bow, McLachlan & Co. entered the specialist market for "knock down" vessels. These were bolted together at the shipyard, all the parts marked with numbers, disassembled into many hundreds of parts and transported in kit form for final reassembly with rivets. This elaborate method of construction was used to provide inland shipping for export, or for lakes that had no navigable link with the open sea. The company supplied a number of "knock down" ships to the Uganda Railway for service on Lake Victoria, including the passenger and cargo sister ships Sybil and Winifred (1901), the larger Clement Hill (1905) and cargo ship Nyanza (1907).

Bow, McLachlan developed a good reputation for building tugs, such as Hallgarth (1901), Samson (1903), Roca (1904) and Admiralty paddle tug HMS Robust (1907). The company also built barges, river steamers and small cargo ships. In 1903 the firm shipped the 100 feet (30 m) long shallow-draught cargo steamer Myee to Australia "in sections for re-erection at Sydney". Ships built in 1904 included the sail and steam-powered cutter HMS Argus for HM Coast Guard and the steam yacht Hildegarde for Lord Pender. In 1906 Bow, McLachlan built cable layer ships for two of Sir John Pender's telegraph companies: Cormorant for the Western Telegraph Co. and Sentinel for the Eastern Telegraph Co.

In 1912 Bow, McLachlan built two coastal "pocket liners" for the Canadian Pacific Railway Coast Service in British Columbia: the sister ships Princess Mary and Princess Sophia. In 1913 it built two more "knock down" passenger and cargo ships for the Uganda Railway: the sister ships Usoga and Rusinga.

=== First World War ===
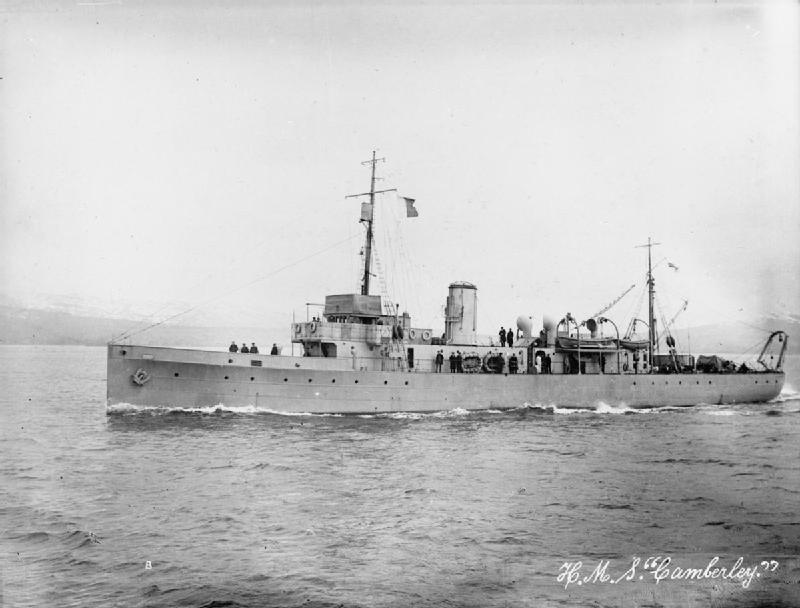
Hunt-class minesweeper HMS Camberley

In the First World War Bow, MacLachlan supplied the Royal Navy with the Azalea-class sloop HMS Camellia and Acacia-class sloops HMS Marigold and Mimosa in 1915, the Arabis-class sloop HMS Myosotis in 1916 and several Castle-class naval trawlers. It also supplied the Hunt-class minesweeper HMS Cotswold in 1916, HMS Cottesmore in 1917, HMS Blackburn, Bootle, Caerleon and Camberley in 1918 and HMS Carstairs and Caterham in 1919. Also in 1919 it built several Moor class mooring vessels for the Admiralty.

=== 1920–32 ===
In 1920 the company went into voluntary liquidation but was reconstituted as a new company with the same name. Also in 1920 the company built the steam yacht Volo for its co-founder William Bow. In the 1920s Bow, Maclachlan supplied export orders from countries including Australia, Greece, India and Portugal. At the beginning of the 1930s the company supplied export orders including a class of six tugs for the Chilean Navy.

In 1930 Bow, McLachlan built the motor yacht Kiloran for Lord Strathcona and Mount Royal. However, by then manufacturing in the UK was declining in the Great Depression so the UK Government sponsored a rationalisation of the shipbuilding industry. In 1932 National Shipbuilders Securities took over and closed down Bow, McLachlan.

In the Second World War the yard was reopened briefly to build landing craft.

== Surviving ships ==
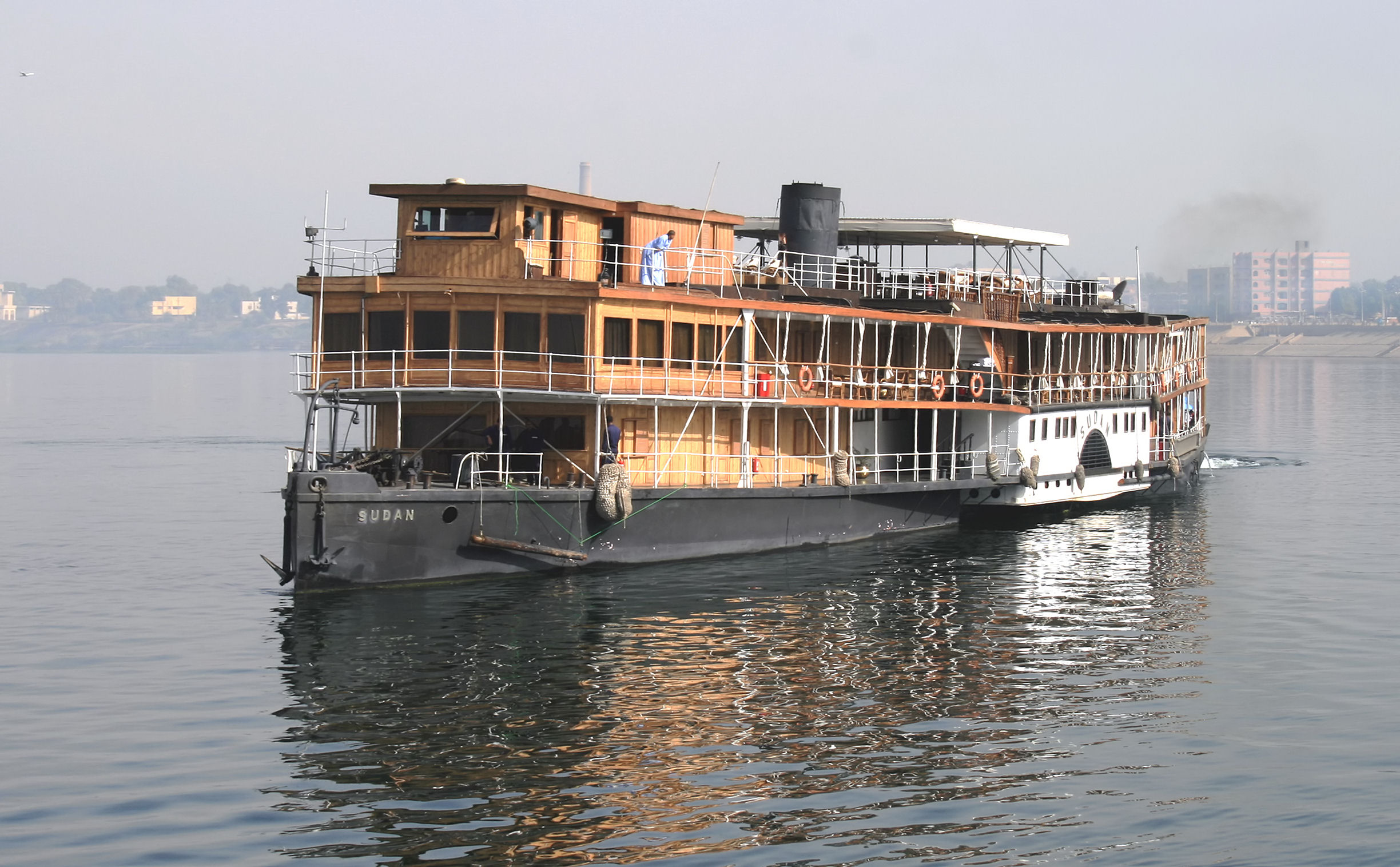
Sudan on the River Nile in 2010

Several Bow, MacLachlan ships survive around the World. The veteran cargo ship Nyanza and cargo and passenger ship Rusinga on Lake Victoria were reported to have survived into the 21st century, now trading in private ownership. One UK Admiralty Moor class mooring vessel, HMDYC Moorstone, continues in civilian service as the Turkish-registered Çıkaran. The paddle steamer Sudan (1921) was restored in 2001 and continues in tourist service on the River Nile. The pilot boat John Oxley (1927) is preserved in Sydney, New South Wales. The tug Colo Colo is preserved in Punta Arenas, Chile and the paddle tug John H Amos (also 1931) is preserved at Chatham Historic Dockyard, England.
