= SS Princess Alice (1911) =

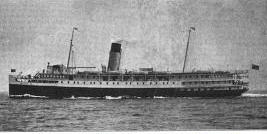
- SS Princess Alice c. 1912

History
- Name: 1911-1949: Princess Alice; 1949-1966 Aegaeon
- Owner: 1911-1949: Canadian Pacific Railway Coast Service; 1949-1966: Typaldos Line
- Port of registry: 1911-1949: Canada; 1949-1966: Greece
- Builder: Swan, Hunter & Wigham Richardson
- Yard number: 833
- Launched: March 29, 1911
- Completed: September 1911
- Out of service: 1966
- Fate: Wrecked in tow at Civitavecchia, December 1966

General characteristics
- Type: Ocean liner
- Tonnage: 3,099 tons
- Length: 290.6 ft (88.6 m)

SS Princess Alice was a passenger vessel in the coastal service fleet of the Canadian Pacific Railway (CPR) during the first half of the 20th century.

This ship was called a "pocket liner" because she offered amenities like a great ocean liner, but on a smaller scale. The ship was part of the CPR "Princess fleet," which was composed of ships having names which began with the title "Princess". Along with the SS Princess Adelaide the SS Princess Mary and the SS Princess Sophia, the SS Princess Alice was one of four similar ships built for CPR during 1910–1911.

== History ==
The SS Princess Alice was built by Swan Hunter, Wallsend, United Kingdom for the Canadian Pacific Railway. Princess Alice was launched on May 29, 1911; and she was completed in September 1911.

The 3,099-ton vessel had length of 290.6 feet (88.6 m), breadth of 46.1 feet (14.1 m), and depth of 14.3 feet (4.4 m)

In 1913, Princess Alice made several special Alaskan cruises through the inside passage at reduced rate of $60 round trip.

In 1949, the ship was sold to Typaldos Lines, and she was renamed SS Aegaeon. On April 1, 1955, the ship, sailing from Venice, undertook a "Hellenic Cruise" organised by Swans Tours of 8, Great Russell Street, London. The cruise took the ships passengers southwards to the Ionian Sea, through the Corinth Canal and into the Aegean Sea, thence through the Sea of Marma, and on to Istanbul. In returning through the Sea of Marma the ship visited Thassoss, Skiathos, and Skros, before berthing at Piraeus, where passengers went on to Athens. The ship then returned through the Corinth Canal to Venice. On the outward leg many sites of antiquity were visited, including Ithaca, Delphi, Delos, Mykonos, Samos, Ephesus and Troy. Among the many passengers on the cruise were The Hon. Michael Berry (later Baron Hartwell) and Lady Berry; Frederick Smith, 2nd Earl of Birkenhead, with his son The Viscount of Furneaux (later Frederick Smith, 3rd Earl of Birkenhead); the classical scholar Sir Maurice Bowra; American born Professor Sir Arthur Lehman Goodhart, and his wife Lady Goodhart; The Lord Moyne (Bryan Walter Guinness of the brewing family) and Lady Elisabeth Moyne, with four of their children; the former war-time MI6 Swiss station chief Count Frederick Vanden-Heuvel and his wife Countess Vanden-Heuvel; and the noted archaeologist Sir Mortimer Wheeler and Lady Wheeler. The cruise was completed on April 15, 1955, when the ship berthed at Venice. Sir Maurice Bowra and Sir Mortimer Wheeler, along with other academics, gave talks both aboard ship and at various sites visited.

The ship was wrecked in tow at Civitavecchia in December 1966. Typaldos Lines went bankrupt after being found guilty due to manslaughter, negligence, and document falsification in 1968.

== See also ==
- CP Ships
- List of ocean liners
- List of ships in British Columbia
