= Moonrise and moonset =

Daily appearance and disappearance of the Moon at the Earth's horizon

Summer moonset over the Ionian Sea in Capilungo in August 2026. The lunar disk appears heavily distorted and flattened due to the atmospheric optical phenomenon known as a mock mirage on the sea horizon line.

Moonrise and moonset are times when the upper limb of the Moon appears above the horizon and disappears below it, respectively. The exact times depend on the lunar phase and declination, as well as the observer's location. As viewed from outside the polar circles, the Moon, like all other celestial objects outside the circumpolar circle, rises from the eastern half of the horizon and sets into the western half due to Earth's rotation.

== Direction and time ==
=== Direction ===
Since Earth rotates eastward, all celestial objects outside the circumpolar circle (including the Sun, Moon, and stars) rise in the east and set in the west for observers not in the polar circles. Seasonal variation means that they sometimes rise in the east-northeast or east-southeast, and sometimes set in the west-southwest or west-northwest. This north-south variation of the point along the horizon, for the moon, is bookended by two lunar standstills or turnarounds, the directions of which are sometimes depicted in archaeoastronomical constructions. It takes 18.6 years for the Moon to traverse this variation viewed from a vantage point on Earth.

=== Time ===
Summer Moonset

The Moon's position relative to Earth and the Sun determines the moonrise and moonset time. For example, a last quarter rises at midnight and sets at noon. A waning gibbous is best seen from late night to early morning. On average, the Moon rises 50 minutes later each day/night than the day/night before, due to the fact that the Moon moves 13 degrees every day. Hence, the Earth must move 13 degrees after completing one rotation for the Moon to be visible.

Note that this table shows moonrise and moonset times as if they were exactly 12 hours apart, rather than 12 hours and 25 minutes which the other references indicate, or some other seasonally varying time interval.

Moonrise/moonset for different moon phases
Lunar phase (illustration as seen from northern hemisphere)	Moonrise (Note: Varies slightly. (Same note for "Culmination time (highest point)" and "Moonset".))	Culmination time (highest point)	Moonset	Best seen
New moon	6:00 a.m.	Noon	6:00 p.m.	Not visible unless there is a solar eclipse
Waxing crescent	9:00 a.m.	Afternoon	9:00 p.m.	Late morning to early evening
First quarter	12:00 p.m.	Sunset	12:00 a.m.	Early evening to late night
Waxing gibbous	3:00 p.m.	Late evening	3:00 a.m.	Early evening and most of night
Full moon	6:00 p.m.	Midnight	6:00 a.m.	Sunset to sunrise (all night), a lunar eclipse is then possible
Waning gibbous	9:00 p.m.	Predawn	9:00 a.m.	Most of night and early morning
Last quarter	12:00 a.m.	Sunrise	12:00 p.m.	Predawn to post-sunrise
Waning crescent	3:00 a.m.	Late morning	3:00 p.m.	Predawn to afternoon

== Visual appearance ==
Atmospheric distortion of the Moon's appearance at Earth's horizon.

The Moon appears to be larger at moonrise or moonset due to an illusion. This illusion, known as the Moon illusion, is caused by an effect of the brain. There is no definitive explanation for the Moon illusion. However, it is most likely because of how the brain perceives objects at different distances, and/or the distance we expect objects to be from us when they are near the horizon.

The Moon appears to be more yellowish near the horizon. This is for the same reason the Sun and/or sky appears to be orangey-red at sunrise/sunset. When the Moon appears near the horizon, the light coming from it has to pass through more layers of atmosphere. This scatters the blue away, and leaves yellow, orange, and red. This is also the reason the Moon appears red during a deep partial or total lunar eclipse.
