= SS Princess Alice =

SS Princess Alice may refer to the following ships:

- SS Princess Alice (1865), steamship, sank in the Thames 1878 with an estimated 640 dead
- SS Princess Alice (1900), under this name from 1904 to 1917 for North German Lloyd. Later:
  - as SS Kiautschou for Hamburg-America Line
  - as USS Princess Matoika for U.S. Navy
  - as USAT Princess Matoika for U.S. Army
  - as SS Princess Matoika in passenger service
  - as SS President Arthur for United States Lines and American Palestine Line
  - as SS City of Honolulu for Los Angeles Steamship Company
  - scrapped 1933
- SS Princess Alice (1911), coastal liner for the Canadian Pacific Railway Co.
- Princess Alice, oceanographic research ship that took part in Prince Albert I expeditions
