= Eldred Rock Light =

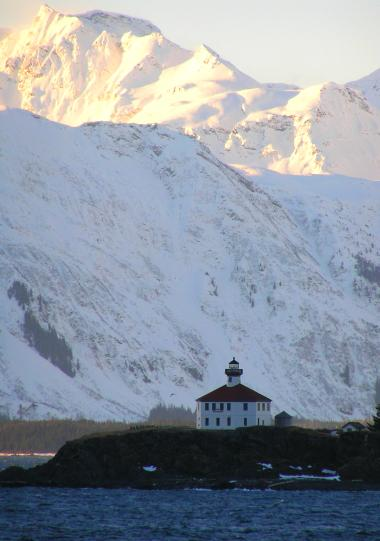
- Eldred Rock Light
- Location: Eldred Rock; Lynn Canal; Alaska; United States
- Coordinates: 58.97096°N 135.22026°W

Tower
- Constructed: 1905
- Foundation: masonry
- Construction: wooden tower
- Automated: 1973
- Height: 56 feet (17 m)
- Shape: octagonal tower with balcony and lantern centred on the roof of a 2-storey keeper's house
- Power source: solar power
- Operator: Sheldon Museum and Cultural Center
- Heritage: National Register of Historic Places listed place

Light
- Focal height: 91 feet (28 m)
- Lens: Fourth order Fresnel lens (original), 250 mm lens (current)
- Range: 8 nautical miles (15 km; 9.2 mi)
- Characteristic: Fl W 6s.
- Eldred Rock Lighthouse
- U.S. National Register of Historic Places
- Alaska Heritage Resources Survey
- Nearest city: Haines, Alaska
- Area: less than one acre
- Architectural style: Octagon Mode
- NRHP reference No.: 75000332
- AHRS No.: JUN-081

Significant dates
- Added to NRHP: December 30, 1975
- Designated AHRS: 1970

The Eldred Rock Light is an historic octagonal lighthouse adjacent to Lynn Canal in Alaska. It is the last of the ten lighthouses constructed in Alaska between 1902 and 1906. It was also the last of 12 staffed lighthouses that were started in Alaska. It is listed on the National Register of Historic Places as Eldred Rock Lighthouse.

== History ==
The Lighthouse Board approved plans for a lighthouse on Eldred Rock in 1905 and hoped that the design would be completed before November and the coming of harsh winter weather. However, due to weather, the lighthouse was not finished until June 1, 1906. A fourth-order Fresnel lens was placed in the lantern room, near the top of the fifty-six foot lighthouse, at a focal plane of ninety-one feet. This unique lens consisted of two bull's-eye panels — one about four feet in diameter and the opposing one a smaller, 14-inch panel. A sheet of red glass was placed between the light source and the larger prism, causing the revolving lens to produce alternating red and white flashes. The light was automated by the United States Coast Guard in 1973 and downgraded to a minor light.

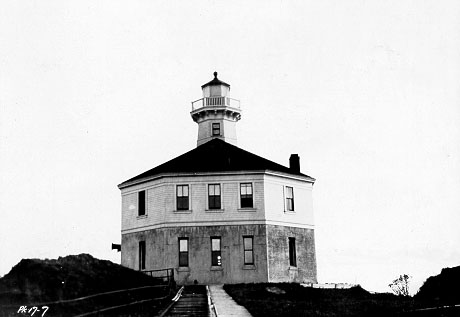
USCG archive photo

In view of Skagway's commercial importance, the United States Board of Light-Houses established four staffed lighthouses in Lynn Canal between the years 1902 and 1906. This was nearly half the number of light stations ever located in Southeast Alaska in the 1900s. Commissioned in 1906, Eldred Rock Light Station was the last lighthouse constructed in Lynn Canal; the second station in Alaska with light and fog-signal apparatus and keepers' quarters combined in a single structure; and the first lighthouse in Alaska constructed with concrete.

Nils Peter Adamson was a keeper on Eldred Rock in 1910, when his colleagues (John Currie and John Silander) disappeared during their way with victuals from lighthouse Point Sherman to Eldred Rock.

It was listed on the National Register of Historic Places in 1975.

The original lens was moved to a museum in Haines, Alaska in 1978.

== See also ==
- List of lighthouses in the United States
- National Register of Historic Places listings in Haines Borough, Alaska
