= Vanderbilt Reef =

Rocky outcropping in Alaska, United States

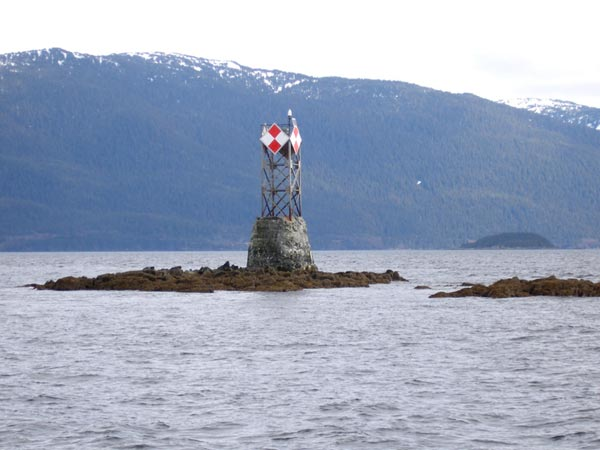
The tip of Vanderbilt Reef visible above the water, with a navigation beacon.

Vanderbilt Reef is a rocky outcropping in Lynn Canal, a fjord in Alaska, United States at 58°35′31″N 135°0′55″W. The outcropping is visible just above the water's surface.

On October 25, 1918, the Canadian Pacific steamer SS Princess Sophia ran aground on Vanderbilt Reef in the early morning during poor visibility. The ship remained lodged in the reef for 40 hours, the end of which saw a large storm develop. The ship broke apart at night, and all on board were lost.
