= Lynn Canal =

Natural inlet in Alaska Panhandle, US

Coordinates: 58°41′31″N 135°05′51″W

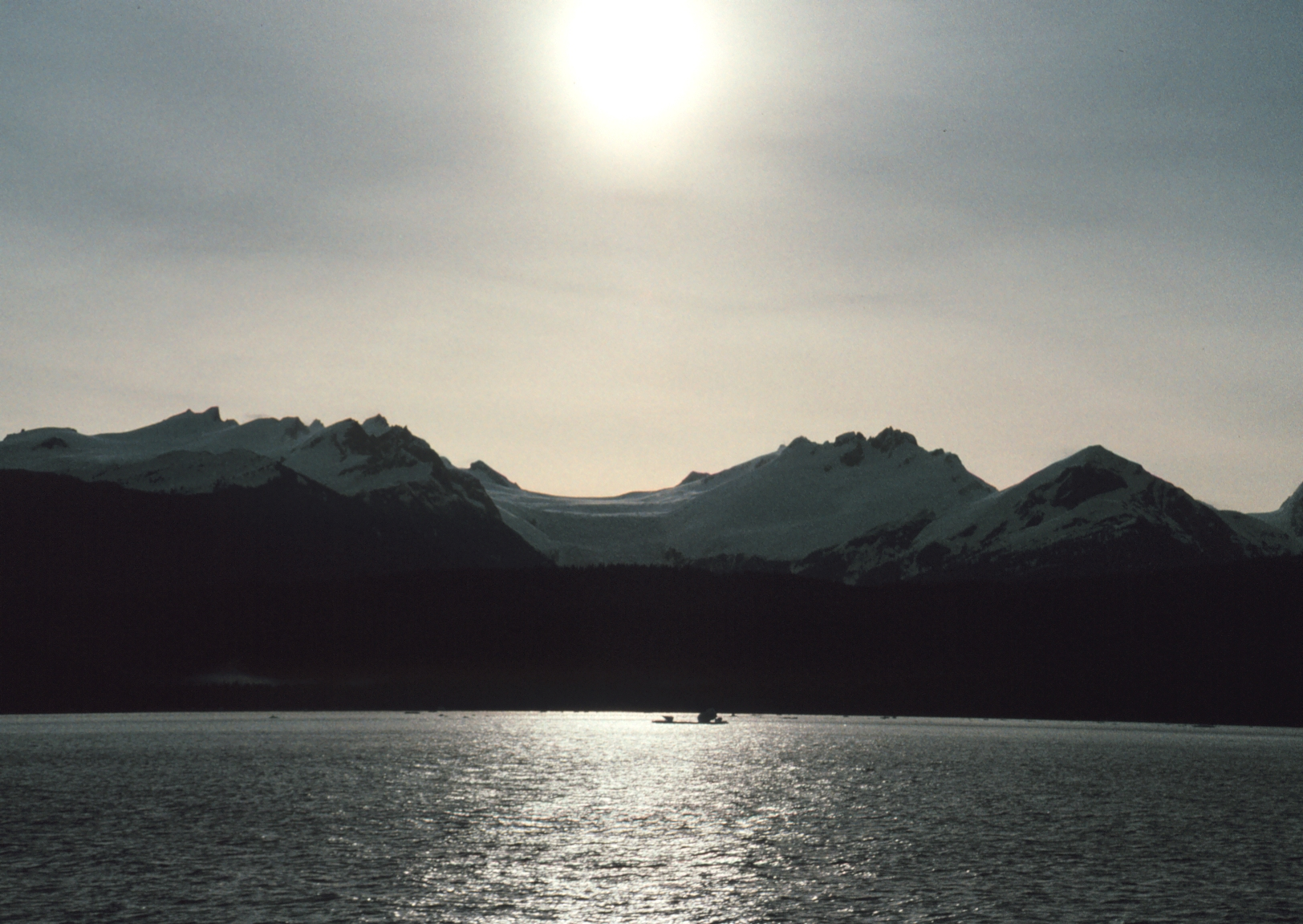
Lynn Canal, Haines area of southeast Alaska

Lynn Canal is an inlet (not an artificial canal) into the mainland of southeast Alaska.

Lynn Canal runs about 90 miles (140 km) from the inlets of the Chilkat River south to Chatham Strait and Stephens Passage. At over 2,000 feet (610 m) in depth, Lynn Canal is 3rd the deepest fjord in North America (outside Greenland and Nunavut) after Jervis Inlet and Bute Inlet in British Columbia.

The northern portion of the canal braids into the respective Chilkat, Chilkoot, and Taiya Inlets.

The Tlingit are the indigenous people of the Lynn Canal's shores and waterways. The inlet was explored for the Royal Navy by Joseph Whidbey in 1794 and named by George Vancouver for his birthplace, King's Lynn, Norfolk, England.

Lynn Canal was frequently visited by maritime fur traders from at least 1800. The Atahualpa visited in 1801 and its log mentions an earlier trading visit by an unidentified ship.

In April 1811 the American maritime fur trader Samuel Hill, captain of Otter, battled the Chilkat Tlingit in the Chilkat Inlet of Lynn Canal. Two of Hill's crew were killed, including his second mate and journal keeper Richard Kemp, his boatswain. Six more were wounded. According to Captain Hill, the Tlingit suffered 40 killed, including 13 chiefs. Hill blamed both his first mate and the Tlingit, but he was notoriously violent and frequently attacked indigenous people unprovoked.

For several years after the 1811 battle fewer trade ships visited. By 1821 it was again a regular trading site, with visits by ships such as the Mentor in 1821.

== Transportation ==
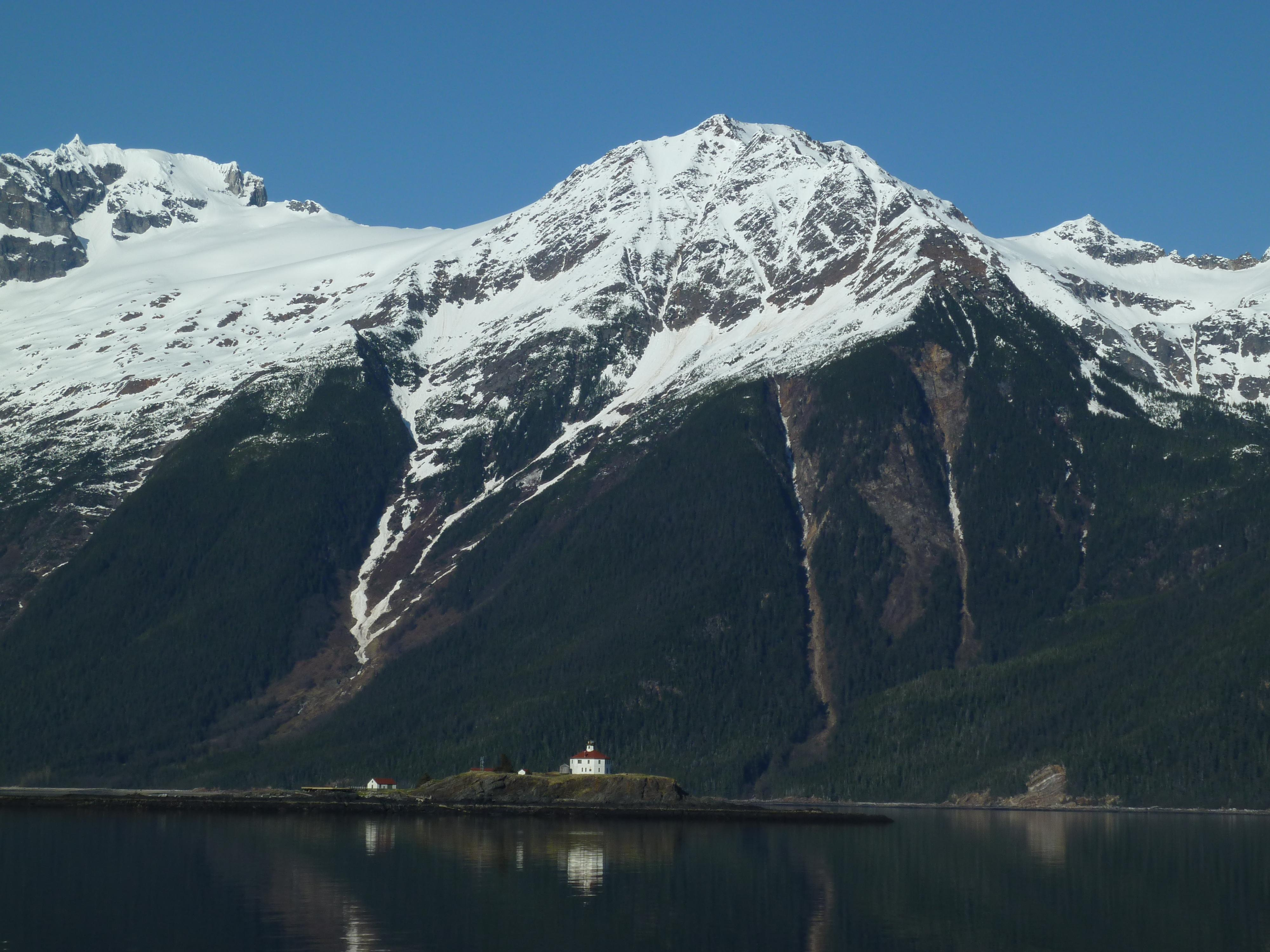
Eldred Rock Light and avalanche chutes in Lynn Canal

Lynn Canal's location as a penetrating waterway into the interior connects Skagway and Haines, Alaska, to Juneau and the rest of the Inside Passage thus making it a major route for shipping, cruise ships, and ferries.

During the Klondike Gold Rush it was a major route to the boom towns of Skagway and Dyea and thence to the Klondike gold fields. The worst maritime disaster in the history of the Pacific Northwest occurred in Lynn Canal during October 1918, when SS Princess Sophia, steaming southbound from Skagway, grounded on the Vanderbilt Reef and later sank, with the loss of all 343 passengers and crew.

After the gold rush and the creation of the White Pass and Yukon Route railroad, ore and other freight from the Yukon Territory was transported on the railroad to Skagway and its deepwater port and then shipped through Lynn Canal. However, in the 1970s and 1980s the freight subsided as mining activity curtailed in the interior and today very little freight is actually shipped in the Lynn Canal.

Currently, transportation in the canal is provided by Alaska Marine Highway ferries. There are also several other entrepreneurial water taxis and ferries available, but the AMHS is far and away the most frequently used. A project of uncertain future is the Lynn Canal Highway.

Because of Lynn Canal′s high use, the United States Coast Guard installed several lighthouses in the early 20th century including Eldred Rock Light, Sentinel Island Light, and Point Sherman Light.

Historically, Lynn Canal proved to be a waterway involved in the Alaska boundary dispute, over the strip of land running down the Pacific coast between British Columbia and Alaska. Of particular value was that Lynn Canal provided access to the Yukon, where gold was found in 1896. The dispute was fought between the United Kingdom, which then controlled Canada's foreign relations, and the United States, and finally settled in 1903 by arbitration. The arbitrators ruled that the canal was part of Alaska, not British Columbia.
