= Princess Louise (sidewheeler) =

Canadian paddle steamer

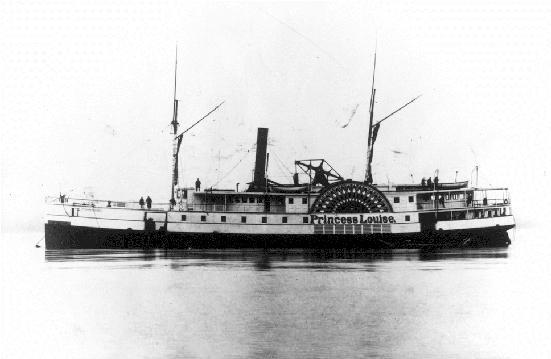
- Princess Louise, at Masset, BC, circa 1880.

History
- Name: Princess Louise
- Owner: Hudson's Bay Company; Canadian Pacific Railway, others.
- Route: San Francisco Bay, Puget Sound, coastal British Columbia and southeast Alaska
- In service: 1869
- Out of service: 1919 (unpowered after 1906)
- Identification: Canadian #72682: US #19297
- Fate: Sank at Port Alice, British Columbia

General characteristics
- Tonnage: 971 gross tons.
- Length: 180 ft (55 m)
- Beam: 30 ft (9 m)
- Depth: 12.5 ft (4 m) depth of hold
- Installed power: Walking beam single-cylinder steam engine
- Propulsion: side wheels
- Sail plan: brig (auxiliary)

Princess Louise was a sidewheel steamboat built in 1869. From 1869 to 1879, this ship was named Olympia. In 1879, the name was changed to Princess Louise, after Princess Louise, Duchess of Argyll, a daughter of Queen Victoria who was married to Marquess of Lorne (1845–1914), Governor General of Canada from 1878 to 1883. Princess Louise was the last sidewheeler to be operated commercially on the coast of British Columbia.

== Design and construction ==
Olympia was built in 1869 in New York City by John English and Sons to the order of George S. Wright, a pioneer steamboat man on Puget Sound. The ship was 180 feet (55 m) long, with a beam of 30 feet (9.1 m) and depth of hold of 12.5 feet (3.8 m). The hull was built of seasoned white oak. Power was supplied by single-cylinder walking beam type steam engine, manufactured by John Roach & Sons. The engine's cylinder was 46 inches (1,200 mm) in diameter and had a stroke of 11 feet (132 inches). The engine generated 350 horsepower. The overall size of the vessel was 971 gross tons, and, as of 1874, 493 registered tons. The ship had an auxiliary sailing rig as a brig. The official United States steamboat registry number was 19297.

Construction of Olympia was supervised by Capt. James Bolger, who commanded the vessel in the 75-day delivery voyage around Cape Horn. Olympia arrived in San Francisco on November 19, 1869. Continuing north, Olympia arrived at the city of Olympia on December 3, 1869.

== Operations ==
On December 7, 1869, Olympia was employed on the Olympia-Victoria route for the first time, running under the ownership of the Finch and Wright partnership. Olympia was commissioned as the replacement for the older and slower Eliza Anderson, a vessel once so profitable that it became known as the "floating gold mine", which the partnership then used as a reserve boat. In April 1870, the partnership suffered a business reverse when the mail contract was lost to Capt. J.T. Nash, who had submitted an annual bid of $12,000 to carry mail on weekly runs to Victoria, British Columbia and on a semi-weekly route between Olympia and Port Townsend, Washington Territory. Nash, who was to take over the mail contract on July 1, 1870, prepared by purchasing and reconstructing the half-completed sidewheeler Tacoma.

To do this, Nash secured the financial backing of two successful businessmen from Portland, Oregon, Edwin A. and Louis A. Starr. When the rebuilding of Tacoma was complete, the vessel was renamed Alida, and the Starrs were in full ownership of the vessel. They also assumed Nash's interest in the mail contract. Nash took over running a smaller vessel, Varuna, in alliance the Starrs. Once Edwin Starr acquired his master's license, the Starr brothers bought another steamer, Isabel, which was somewhat larger than Alida, and was considered one of the most seaworthy vessels on the coast.

== 1871 steamboat race ==
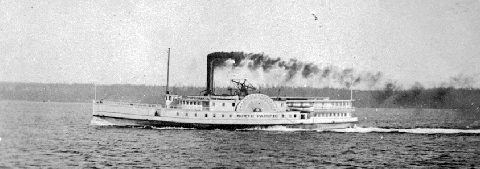
North Pacific circa 1871, Olympia's rival in the 1871 steamboat race.

To meet the challenge of the Starrs, the Wright and Finch partnership brought out Eliza Anderson as their primary vessel and undercut the Starrs on passenger fares and freight rates. Isabel proved to be a speedier vessel than Anderson and so Wright and Finch substituted Olympia in the competition against the Starrs. The Starrs however responded by commissioning Joseph Gates, a well-regarded engineer on Columbia river steamboats, to design and build a steamer which would run faster and cheaper than Olympia. This vessel, which was named the North Pacific, was constructed at the Gates and Colyer shipyard in San Francisco, and launched on May 18, 1871. Capt. Dan Morrison brought North Pacific into the Strait of Juan de Fuca on June 23, 1871. For a few days after that, North Pacific was engage in trial trips. Meanwhile, Finch, in command of Olympia was preparing for a race to show the public which steamboat was superior. Finch went so far as to have the coal lumps on Olympia sorted into uniform sizes.

On June 27, 1871, Olympia and North Pacific were both at Victoria, with Olympia scheduled to depart for Port Townsend in the morning, with North Pacific making the same run in the afternoon. Intending to challenge North Pacific that day, Finch delayed departure of Olympia but kept steam up in the boiler. Word spread around Victoria, which tended to favor Olympia, that a race was impending, and bets were made favoring Olympia at 10 to 1 over North Pacific. The Starrs meanwhile tried to lower expectations by telling people that their ship was not yet ready for racing.

When North Pacific cast off lines, Olympia did likewise, and followed North Pacific out of Victoria harbor. As North Pacific made a south-easterly course for Point Wilson, 36 miles (58 km) of open water away from Victoria, Olympia's firemen poured on the coals, causing clouds of black smoke to spew out of the ship's smokestack. Olympia, the heavier, oak-built vessel, was favored over the long open stretch, whereas North Pacific was thought to be able to better in the narrower waters near Point Wilson.

The resulting race between the two vessels, each of which was almost new, and represented the highest point of technical achievement for the time, was long remembered by the people on board the ships and alongside the wharves of Victoria and Port Townsend. Over most of the run, the two steamers ran almost side by side at maximum speed. But as the neared Point Wilson, North Pacific drew ahead, reaching Port Townsend in 2 hours and 41 minutes, 13 minutes and four miles (6 km) ahead of Olympia.

Finch and Wright soon composed their differences with the Starrs, who bought the Finch and Wright dock and warehouse in Olympia. In addition, in a typical anti-competitive agreement of the time, paid Finch and Wright a subsidy to keep Olympia off the Victoria route. Finch and Wright then withdrew Olympia to California.

Olympia was based in California for the next seven years and managed to collect another subsidy from a California rival in return for staying out of competition. During this time Olympia made a voyage to Hawaii.

== Canadian service ==
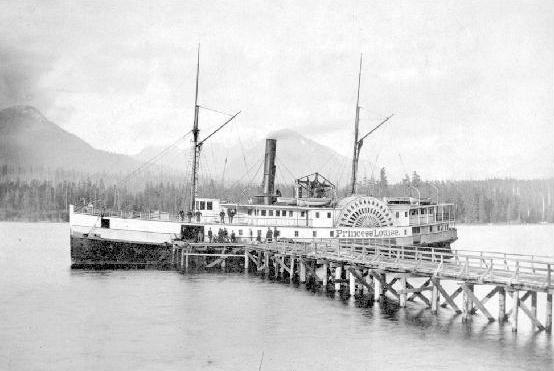
Princess Louise at Comox, British Columbia circa 1880.

By 1878, the Starrs had paid $50,000 to Olympia's owners, and they decided to terminate the subsidy. Olympia was then returned to Puget Sound, and was then under the ownership of George S. Wright. At that time, the Hudson's Bay Company (HBC) was engaged in a competitive struggle with John Irving, who had recently purchased the former Gold Rush steamer Wilson G. Hunt. To beat the Hunt, the Hudson's Bay Company HBC bought Olympia from Wright for $75,000. The ship was reregistered in Canada and assigned Canadian registry #72682.

HBC operated Olympia under the ship's original name until May 1879, when it changed the name to Princess Louise, after Princess Louise, Duchess of Argyll (1848–1939), a daughter of Queen Victoria, who was married to Marquess of Lorne (1845–1914), Governor General of Canada from 1878 to 1883. In the summer of 1879, competition between Princess Louise and the Hunt drove rates down on the routes between Vancouver Island and the mainland. In August 1879 Princess Louise ran an excursion around Vancouver Island, which was possibly the first such cruise to take place.

In 1880, HBC and Irving settled the rate war. In a monopolistic arrangement which became known as the "'arf and 'arf agreement", HBC ships would carry passengers to and from New Westminster, where they would transfer to an Irving-owned stternwheeler for the trip up river to the head of navigation at Yale. This was a suitable arrangement for the Princess Louise because as a sidewheeler the ship required improved docking facilities that were not available upriver from New Westminster.

In the late summer of 1880, when word reached Victoria that the steamship Otter had wrecked five miles (8 km) out of Bella Bella on August 19, 1880, Princess Louise was sent to the scene with the Lloyd's agent and HBC officials on board in an attempt to salvage Otter. This proved to be not possible, and Princess Louise was forced to return to Victoria with as much cargo as could be salvaged from the Otter.

In May 1881, the Canadian Pacific was anxiously recruiting as many laborers as it could for the difficult work of completing the transcontinental rail line down the valley of the Fraser River. Princess Louise transported the first group of laborers, who had been recruited from San Francisco and from China to New Westminster on March 25, 1881.

== Transfer of ownership ==
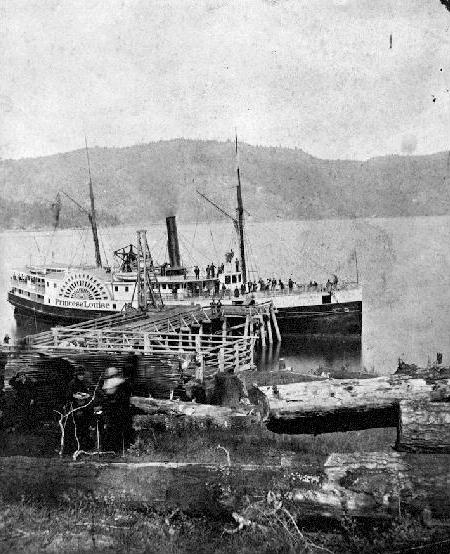
Princess Louise in the 1880s, at a small dock somewhere in British Columbia.

In 1883, the Canadian Pacific Navigation Company was incorporated. Although the stated capital was $500,000, divided into 5,000 shares valued at $100 each, the actual paid-up capital was only $336,000, divided in 3,360 shares at $100 per share. Most of the shares were controlled indirectly by John Irving, but the Hudson's Bay Company was also allocated a total 1,150 shares. This was in return for transferring ownership of three HBC steamships, including the Princess Louise to the new company, with 750 shares specifically allocated to the Princess Louise.

Princess Louise began its first trip for the new company on March 13, 1883, steaming under Capt. William McCulloch, from Victoria, to Alert Bay, Prince Rupert, Metlakatla, Port Simpson, the Skeena River, Wrangell, Alaska and way ports along the route. On May 4, 1883, the new company announced that Princess Louise would be put on a regular route from Victoria to Burrard Inlet and Port Moody, British Columbia.

Also in 1883, Princess Louise was refitted with new boilers, manufactured by Albion Iron Works of Victoria. Other overhaul work was completed and the ship was returned to service before the beginning of 1884. In October 1887, the mayor of Vancouver, which then was the second largest city in British Columbia next to Victoria, tried to discourage visitors to Vancouver Island by denouncing Princess Louise as unseaworth. John Irving felt this went too far, and he threatened to sue the mayor for libel. He also banned the mayor from travel on any of the company's ships.

From 1886 to 1890, Princess Louise was operated on northern routes, serving among other communities the many cannery ports in coastal British Columbia. In 1898, Princess Louise was used like many other ships on the west coast to carry gold seekers to the Klondike goldfields.

On August 16, 1890, Princess Louise developed a serious leak which forced the ship to return to Victoria. Princess Louise was replaced on the route by Islander.

In 1895 Princess Louise was estimated to be worth $35,000.

In September 1898, Princess Louise returned to Victoria carrying 8,100 cases of canned salmon from Alert Bay, but on this trip there had been a fatal accident. Three of the crew had fallen overboard when they were leaning on a railing posing for a photograph. They were washed beneath the sidewheel and never seen again./

== Canadian Pacific Railway ==
In 1901, the Canadian Pacific Railway purchased the Canadian Pacific Navigation Company and all its ships, including Princess Louise. The name of Princess Louise inspired the Canadian Pacific to name a new series of coastal liners as "Princesses". In 1901, Capt. James W. Troup reported that Princess Louise was in poor mechanical condition, with worn out boilers and engines badly in need of repair. Because the hull was still in good condition, and capable of being operated in the often-dangerous waters of the Strait of Georgia, Troup recommended that the engines be replaced. This however was not done. Even so, the CPR did use Princess Louise in the winter to replace the sternwheeler R.P. Rithet on the route from Victoria to New Westminster and points on the lower Fraser River. In the summers, the Princess Louise was a secondary vessel on northern routes to Rivers Inlet, Port Simpson, British Columbia, and the Queen Charlotte Islands. Ships on this route departed Victoria twice a month, on the 1st and the 15th at 11:00 p.m., and stopped in Vancouver the next day on the way north.

== Disposition ==
In November 1906 Princess Louise was sold to Marpole McDonald of Victoria, who removed the machinery and converted the vessel to a barge. In 1908 McDonald sold the barge to Vancouver Dredging and Salvage Company. In 1916, the barge was sold again to Britannia Mining and Smelting Company, which in turn, in 1917, sold the barge to Whalen Pulp and Paper Co., which in the same year beached the hull on Howe Sound at Woodfibre, British Columbia. The unpowered vessel is also reported to have sunk a considerable distance away from Woodfibre, at Port Alice, British Columbia in 1919 on northern Vancouver Island.

== See also ==
Media related to Princess Louise (ship, 1869) at Wikimedia Commons
