= Enterprise (1861) =

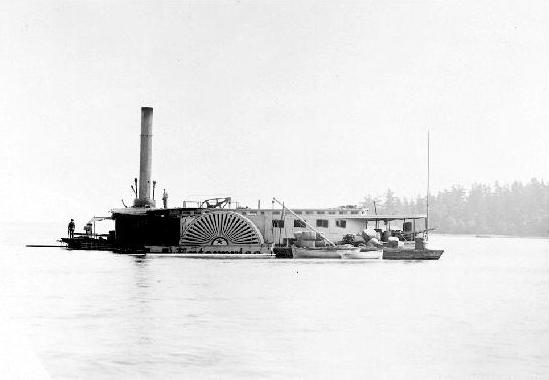

History
- Name: Enterprise
- Operator: Hudson's Bay Company
- Route: Victoria, British Columbia to the lower Fraser River
- In service: 1861
- Out of service: 1885
- Fate: Collided with the R.P. Rithet, and wrecked in Cadboro Bay, July 28, 1885

General characteristics
- Type: inland steamship (passenger/freight)
- Tonnage: 150 gross tons
- Length: 134 ft (41 m)
- Beam: 27.5 ft (8 m)
- Draft: 6.9 ft (2 m)
- Propulsion: sidewheel

Enterprise was a steamship operated on the Fraser River system, from 1861 until her loss in 1885. She should not be confused with several similar vessels of the same name that also operated on the Fraser, around the same time, including the Enterprise of 1855 and Enterprise of 1863.

She was built in San Francisco in 1861, and first operated from Victoria, British Columbia to the lower Fraser River. She made her first voyage after purchase by the Hudson's Bay Company in April 1862.

In 1883 she was sold to the Canadian Pacific Navigation Company, and, she was lost on July 28, 1885, after a collision with the R.P. Rithet.
