= R.P. Rithet (sternwheeler) =

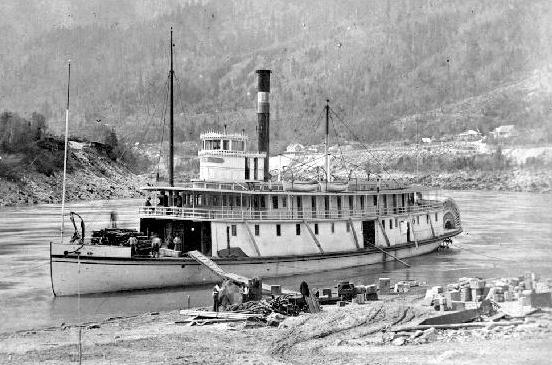
- R.P. Rithet at Yale, BC on the Fraser River.

History
- Name: R.P. Rithet
- Port of registry: CAN #85316
- Route: Fraser River, Strait of Georgia, Howe Sound
- Builder: Alexander Watson of Victoria
- Launched: April 20, 1882
- Maiden voyage: June 10, 1882
- Out of service: 1917
- Fate: Converted to barge

General characteristics
- Type: inland passenger/freighter
- Tonnage: 817 gross tons; 686 registered tons
- Length: 177 ft (54 m)
- Beam: 33.6 ft (10 m)
- Depth: 8.5 ft (3 m) depth of hold
- Installed power: twin steam engines, horizontally mounted, 20" bore by 60" stroke, 250 indicated horsepower, built 1875 by Rishon Iron Works, San Francisco
- Propulsion: sternwheel

R.P. Rithet was a sternwheel steamer that operated in British Columbia from 1882 to 1917. The common name for this vessel was the Rithet. After 1909 this vessel was known as the Baramba.

== Design and construction ==
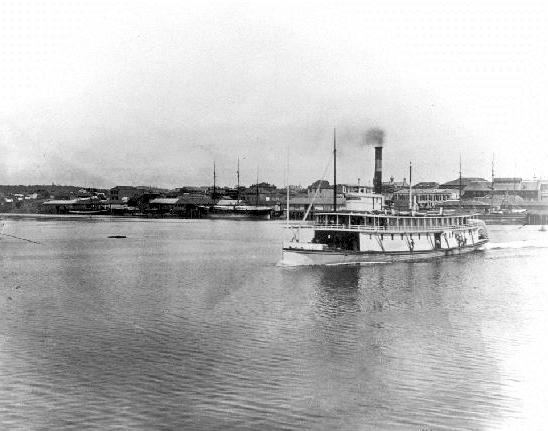
R.P. Rithet at Victoria, BC 1882

R.P.Rithet was designed to replace the recently burned Elizabeth J. Irving. The engines from Elizabeth J. Irving were salvaged and installed in the Rithet, which was intended to the most luxurious riverboat ever launched up to that time in British Columbia. The vessel was built by master shipwright Alexander Watson for Captain (sometimes called "Commodore") John Irving, one of the most famous steamboat captains in the history of British Columbia. The Irving family was strongly connected with development on the east side of Portland, Oregon, and it was reported in the contemporary press that they had sold some of their land in East Portland for $65,000, some of which may have been applied to pay for the new steamer. The new vessel was named after Robert Paterson Rithet, a businessman who was married to the sister of Captain Irving's wife. He was a partner in the firm of Welsh, Rithet, and Co., which had offices in San Francisco and Victoria, BC, and also major sugar holdings in the Hawaiian Islands. Rithet was a close business associate of and adviser to Captain Irving.

Rithet was equipped with hydraulic steering gear, and electric lighting, a new development at that time. The steamer was launched on April 20, 1882, at Victoria. The steamer was to join the Irving family's fleet of other vessels, then known as the Pioneer Line. About six weeks after the vessel was launched, Captain Irving took Rithet on her first voyage to the mainland, arriving at New Westminster, British Columbia on June 10, 1882. Arriving on a Saturday night, the vessel's electric lights shown brilliantly across the water, earning the praise of the local press. A military band had been embarked, which played stirring tunes as crowds of people swarmed on the docks to welcome Captain Irving's new steamer.

== Formation of the Canadian Pacific Navigation Company ==
By 1882, the Pioneer Line had vanquished most of its competitors on the run up the Fraser River from New Westminster. Irving's major rival at the time of the launch of Rithet was Captain William Moore, who ran Western Slope under contract with the Hudson's Bay Company ("HBC") across the Strait of Georgia from New Westminster to Victoria. Moore went into bankruptcy, and Irving and Rithet then joined with Alexandro Munro, HBC chief factor and other prominent businessmen to incorporate the Canadian Pacific Navigation Company ("C.P.N."). HBC contributed three of its vessels, and Irving contributed four, including R.P. Rithet.

== Dispute over seaworthiness ==
In early 1883, Moore, thinking he was still in legal control of Western Slope, launched a legal complaint with the inspector of steamboats claiming that Rithet was not sufficiently seaworthy to cross the Strait of Georgia. The witnesses in support of the complaint were all officers or crew of, or persons interested in Western Slope. Despite this biased evidence the steamboat inspector concurred and forbade Rithet from crossing the Strait until such time as her seaworthiness was established. In response, Alexander Watson, builder of R.P. Rithet defended the vessel's design and construction in a letter to the Victoria Colonist published January 13, 1883. Irving himself went back to Ottawa, Ontario where he was able to persuade the Ministry of Marine to reverse the steamboat inspector, and by February 27, 1883 Rithet was clear again to run across the strait.

== Operations on Fraser River ==
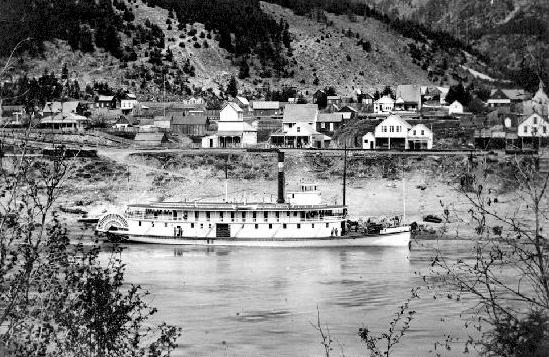
R.P. Rithet at Yale, BC, 1882

Rithet also ran up the Fraser River and occasionally was taken on holiday excursions, such as on July 4, 1883. The American holiday was widely celebrated in British Columbia in those days, due to the large numbers of Americans in the province. On this occasion, Rithet departed Victoria at 1:00 p.m. on July 3, and was due to arrive at Hope the next day. Onboard sports and other diversions with cash prizes were offered. Excursionists could then ride a special Canadian Pacific Railway train to the end of the line at Yale, British Columbia. Once the rail excursions returned to Hope, the steamer then went back down river and across the Strait of Georgia, returning to Victoria on July 6, 1883. The entire excursion would have cost a participant $11, with meals and berth included.

== Competition with Teaser ==
By 1884, Captain Moore was back again in competition with Captain Irving on the Strait of Georgia route. This time Moore had launched a new propeller steamer Teaser, which he registered in the name of one of his sons, apparently in an attempted to stall the numerous creditors that seemed to be constantly pursuing Captain Moore. Teaser however could make little progress against the C.P.N., which was running not only the Rithet on the Strait route, but also the enormous sidewheeler Yosemite, recently brought up from operations in California. Moore was soon forced off the run, and like his Western Slope, Teaser was sold to satisfy the claims of his creditors, later being known as Rainbow.

== Collision with sidewheeler Enterprise ==
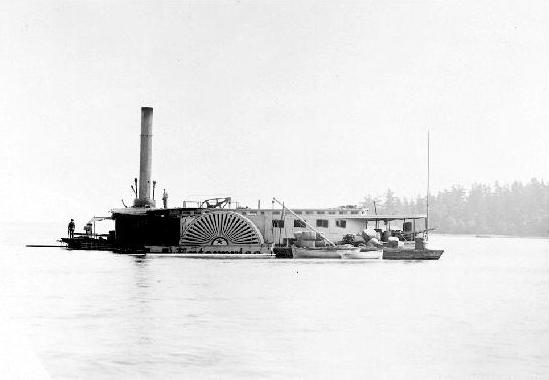
Wreck of Enterprise after collision with R.P. Rithet, late July 1885

On the afternoon of July 28, 1885, Rithet and another vessel, the sidewheeler Enterprise were both bound for Victoria out of New Westminster. Rithet was under the command of Capt. Asbury Insley, and Enterprise was under Captain George Rudlin. The weather was clear and visibility was excellent on that summer day. At about 2:25 p.m. near Victoria, at Ten Mile Point (now known as Cadburo Point) at the entrance to Cadburo Bay, they collided. Rithet's crew claimed Enterprise ignored a whistle blast directly her to put her helm over to port. A minute before the collision, both vessels were proceeding at full speed, although there had been a last-minute attempt to reverse the engines on Rithet just before the impact, and the engines on Enterprise had been stopped. Rithet struck Enterprise bow-on, about eight feet forward of the wheelhouse. Enterprise started sinking immediately and panic broke out among the passengers.

The force of the blow knocked Captain Rudlin off Enterprise and on to the Rithet. Cattle being transported on Enterprise started swimming around in the water, and passengers and crew grabbed on for anything that would float. Most of the passengers of Enterprise were rescued, either by Rithet or by Western Slope which happened to be in the area and assisted in the rescue. Two passengers were drowned however. This was the first fatal accident involving the C.P.N. A later inquest found Captain Insley of Rithet was responsible for the accident, and that all the officers of both vessels, save only the mate of Enterprise, who was seriously hurt, deserved censure for not acting to quell the panic of the passengers aboard Enterprise. Captain Insley's license was suspended for 12 months and he was never employed by C.P.N. or any other company on the coast again, although he was able to find work as a master of inland steamers. His fault was that he had left a green hand at the helm while he left the wheelhouse to eat dinner. Captain Rudlin was faulted for not reboarding Enterprise from Rithet to take action to manage the evacuation of the vessel, but unlike Insley, he continued to receive command assignments from C.P.N.

== Loss of the William Irving ==
On June 28, 1894, Rithet broke her paddlewheel shaft at Maria Slough, near Ruby Creek on the Fraser River, which disabled the vessel because her sternwheel could not be turned. Upriver another C.P.N. vessel the William Irving was loading freight and cattle at Katz Landing. Captain Irving himself took command of William Irving with a plan to bring Rithet downriver for repair. He proceeded downriver to where Rithet lay disabled and lashed up Rithet next to Irving, so that both vessels could proceed downriver side-by-side. Things went well until they reached Farr's Bluff, where the strong current swung both vessels around, and Irving''s bow smashed into a rock. Some of the crew of Irving began to panic, and jumped onto Rithet. Captain Irving, who was at the wheel, ordered the lines to Rithet cut so that both vessels might not sink. Free of Rithet, Irving kept going downstream, gradually sinking, and eventually hit a sandbar, which caused her to become a total wreck, an uninsured loss of a vessel worth $50,000.

== Takeover by Canadian Pacific Railway ==
In early 1901, the Canadian Pacific Railway took over the Canadian Pacific Navigation Company and its fleet of steamships, including Rithet. The name of the C.P.N. continued for a time, as there was not an immediate dissolution of the company's structure. The new superintendent was Capt. James William Troup, a friend of Captain Irving, but who nevertheless had his own ideas of how things should be run. Among other things, Troup wanted to replace the motley C.P.N. collection of wooden coasting vessels, some very old, with some newer vessels, preferably built of steel.

== Changing travel patterns ==
In the late 1890s, changing travel patterns decreased the importance of the Strait of Georgia run from Victoria to New Westminster. Steamers on this route had picked up cargo and passengers in the Gulf Islands along the route, but regular steamers assigned to the Gulf Island routes took away this business. The cannery business used to require that salmon be canned and crated at the Fraser River then transshipped to Victoria to be loaded on ocean-going vessels. By the late 1890s ocean-going vessels were going directly to the canneries on the Fraser River, eliminating the need for steamers to carry the packed salmon to Victoria. Also, when the transcontinental Canadian Pacific Railway was completed with its terminus at Vancouver, British Columbia, steamship traffic shifted over to Vancouver as the preferred point to disembark passengers and unload inland bound cargo. Rithet stayed on the route until 1907, although by 1901 Rithet was only crossing the strait in the summer.

== Last years of service ==
On October 16, 1906, the CPR steamer Princess Victoria ran aground in bad weather near Victoria. The next day the passengers and crew were taken off by Rithet. After the summer of 1907, Ripthet was withdrawn from regular service. In April 1909, C.P.R. sold Rithet to the Terminal Steam Navigation Company, which refitted the vessel to serve points between Vancouver and Howe Sound, and renamed the vessel Baramba. In 1917 all machinery was removed from Baramba and the vessel was converted to a barge.

== See also ==
- List of historical ships in British Columbia
