= Wilson G. Hunt (sidewheeler) =

19th Century steamboat

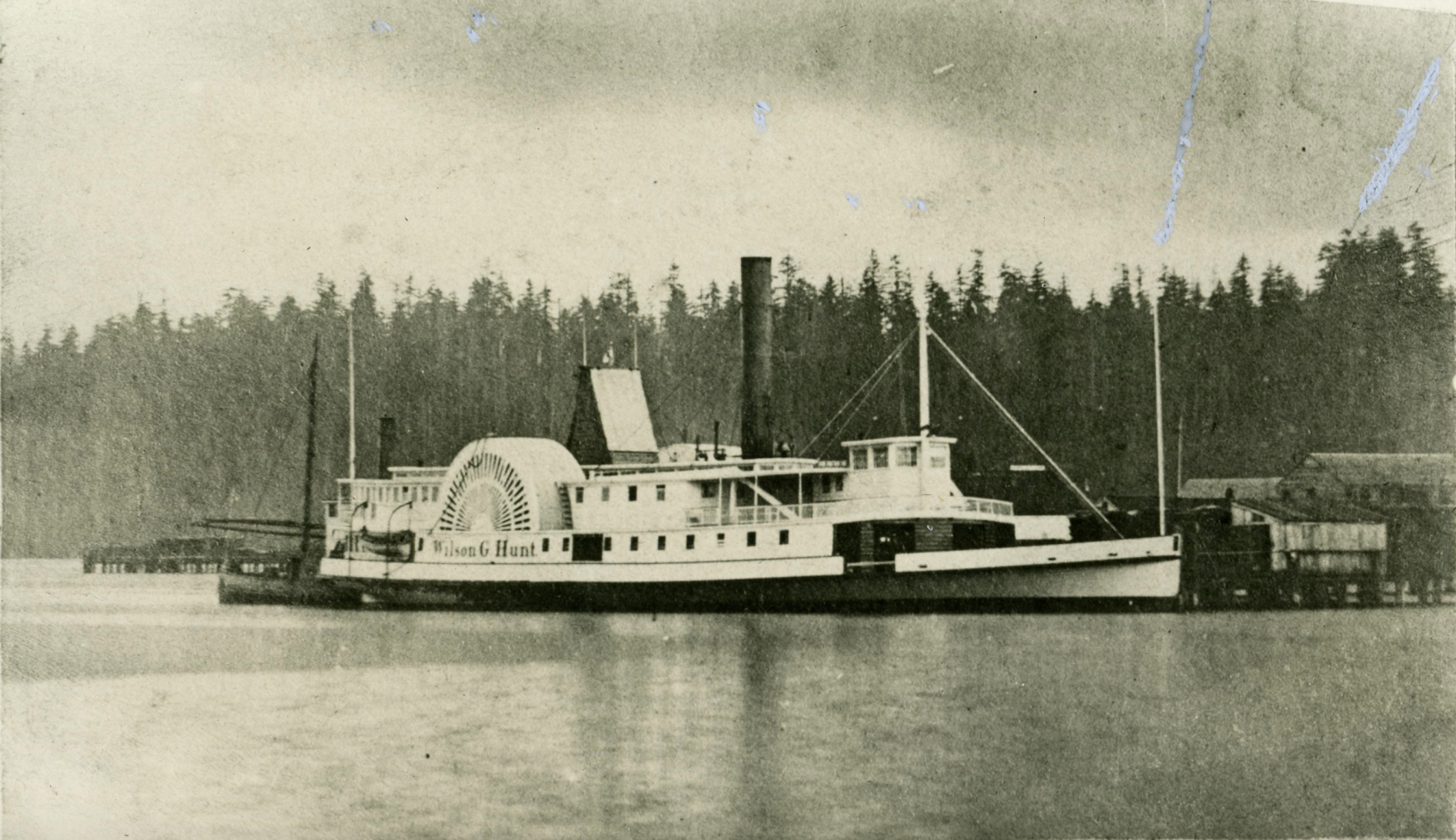
- Wilson G. Hunt

History
- Name: Wilson G. Hunt
- Owner: many, including Oregon Steam Navigation Company
- Route: Puget Sound and Sacramento, Fraser, and Columbia Rivers; Long Island Sound
- In service: 1849
- Out of service: 1884
- Identification: CAN #72676
- Fate: Dismantled 1890

General characteristics
- Type: inland passenger/freighter
- Tonnage: 461 tons gross
- Length: 185.5 ft (57 m)
- Beam: 25.8 ft (8 m)
- Depth: 6.75 ft (2 m) depth of hold
- Installed power: steam engine, low-pressure boiler, single-cylinder, 36" bore by 108" stroke, steeple type.
- Propulsion: sidewheels
- Speed: 15 knots

Wilson G. Hunt was a steamboat that ran in the early days of steam navigation on Puget Sound and Sacramento, Fraser, and Columbia Rivers. She was generally known as the Hunt during her years of operation. She had a long career on the west coast of the United States and Canada, and played an important transportation role in the California Gold Rush; it also transported the Governor and the state legislature as the state capital of California moved from Benicia to Sacramento in 1854.

== Namesake – Wilson G. Hunt ==
The ship was named after a wealthy New York businessman – Wilson G. Hunt (1804–1892) – a prominent cloth merchant and philanthropist who, in 1833, founded the firm, Wilson G. Hunt & Co. Among other endeavors, Hunt was connected with Peter Cooper and involved himself in many of Cooper's institutions including Cooper Union and Cooper-Hewitt. He served as Treasurer on The Cooper Union Board of Trustees from the founding in 1859 to 1890. He served as president of the Illinois Central Railroad from 1874 to 1875. Hunt was born in 1804 as simply Wilson Hunt but attached the middle initial 'G' to distinguish himself. He died in 1892 at age 88.

== Design and construction ==
The steamer Wilson G. Hunt was built in New York in 1849 by the Collyer yard for the excursion trade to Coney Island. The vessel was185.5 ft (57 m), 25.8 ft (8 m) and 6.75 ft (2 m) depth of hold. (Note: Hacking, at 338 gives 8.0 ft (2 m) feet depth of hold.)

The Hunt had an old style "steeple type" steam engine with an enormous single cylinder of 36" bore by 108" inch stroke. The Hunt had a low-pressure boiler, which at the time was advertised as being safer than high-pressure boats. This power plant could drive the vessel at 15 knots. The most unusual feature of the Wilson G. Hunt was the unusual steeple housing for her engine, which looked like an enormous slice of cheese:

Between the wheels and rising high above the cabin was a tall steeple-like frame in which the piston rod rose and fell in guides and moved a pair of connecting rods or pittmans that turned the wheel. Such engines had been common on the Hudson but were becoming rare when the Hunt was built. Normally left exposed, on Hunt the engine was housed, so that the boat appeared to be carrying a tall wooden wedge amidships, thereby not improving the appearance of an otherwise graceful steamer.

The Hunt's steeple engine was the only recorded use of this type on the West Coast. With this type of engine, as well as the more common walking beam type, there were special mechanical dangers. If the engine, powered by a single piston, should ever hang at dead center, the only way to move the piston to discharge the steam was to lever the paddle wheel forward with a long bar. This was extremely dangerous, as should the piston start pumping again, the bar could be flung out of the control of the men pushing it, killing them or breaking bones.

== California Gold Rush steamer ==
For a while the Hunt ran on the New York to Haverstam route. Shortly after her completion word of the California Gold Rush reached New York and the Hunt was sent round the Horn to San Francisco. The vessel nearly sank on the way.

She joined the rush of ships and men to the Pacific Coast in the great gold rush, and December of 1849 saw the Coney Island excursion steamer wallowing off Cape Horn, her big paddle wheels alternately flooded with icy, deep-sea rollers or racing through unsubstantial foam.

Hunt finally arrived in San Francisco early in 1850 The journey took 322 days. The trip simply to Bermuda was difficult, with the Hunt arriving at that colony on March 11, 1850, in deplorable condition, having just barely survived a gale on March 9.

On arrival in San Francisco Hunt was immediately placed in the Sacramento River trade, and proceeded to make a fortune for her owners, clearing in a single year over $1,000,000. Her first owners were Richard Chenery and R.M. Jessup. Competition was fierce on the California rivers, and while "racing" as such was forbidden, steamboat captains were expected to "do their best" which in practice amounted to the same thing. A boiler explosion occurred on board the sidewheeler New World just above Benicia, California during a race with the Wilson G. Hunt. The resultant lawsuit generated a clear picture what such a contest was like during the gold rush times in California:

[The Hunt] was then about a quarter of a mile astern of the New World, and that the boat first arriving at Benicia got from twenty-five to fifty passengers. The pilot of the Hunt says he hardly knows whether the boats were racing, but both were doing their best, and this is confirmed by the assistant pilot, who says the boats were always supposed to come down as fast as possible; the first boat at Benicia gets from twenty-five to fifty passengers. And he adds that at a particular place called 'the slough' the Hunt attempted to pass the New World. Fay, a passenger on board the New World, swears, that on two occasions, before reaching 'the slough' the Hunt attempted to pass the New World, and failed; that to his knowledge these boats had been in the habit of contending for the mastery, and on this occasion both were doing their best. ... Haskell, another passenger, says, 'about ten minutes before the explosion I was standing looking at the engine, we saw the engineer was evidently excited, by his running to a little window to look out at the boat behind. He repeated this ten or fifteen times in a very short time.'

Later Hunt's owners combined with Charles Minturn, Capt. David Van Pelt, and others to form the California Steam Navigation Company, with the objective of forming a monopoly on river transport on the Sacramento river system.

== Fraser River Gold Rush ==
When news of the Fraser Canyon Gold Rush reached California, Hunt's owners sent her north to take advantage of the situation. Hunt arrived in Victoria in the middle of August, 1858. Because there was a shortage of British vessels, the colonial government at Victoria had decided to license American steamers to move the resultant gold rush traffic up the river. and ran for a short time on the New Westminster route. Another vessel running on the same route was the Sea Bird, which on September 7, 1858, caught fire en route and was destroyed, with the loss of two lives. Fortunately the Hunt was not far behind her and was able to take off her surviving passengers and crew.

== Mails and early rate war on Puget Sound ==
In October 1858, Wilson G. Hunt was withdrawn from the Fraser River service and the following year plied on Puget Sound under Capt. A.M. Burns, with Daniel B. Foster as purser. Hunt had been chartered by the Olympia steamboat agent John H. Scranton, who held the mail contract for Puget Sound. Previously the mails had been carried by the steamer Constitution but she had been taken off the route to be repaired preparatory to being transferred to San Francisco. The shallow-draft inland steamer Hunt was regarded as being more suitable for the route than the deeper-draft ocean-going Constitution. In July 1859, the sternwheeler Julia Barclay was brought around to Puget Sound from the Columbia River, arriving on July 9 in Olympia, Washington. John H. Scranton had arranged to have her carry the mail contract which he continued to hold. For about a month Captain Burns tried to compete against the Julia on the Olympia to Victoria run, but Julia's mail contract gave her an advantage and when there wasn't enough business to sustain both boats, the Hunt was tied up in Victoria for about a year.

== Columbia River service ==
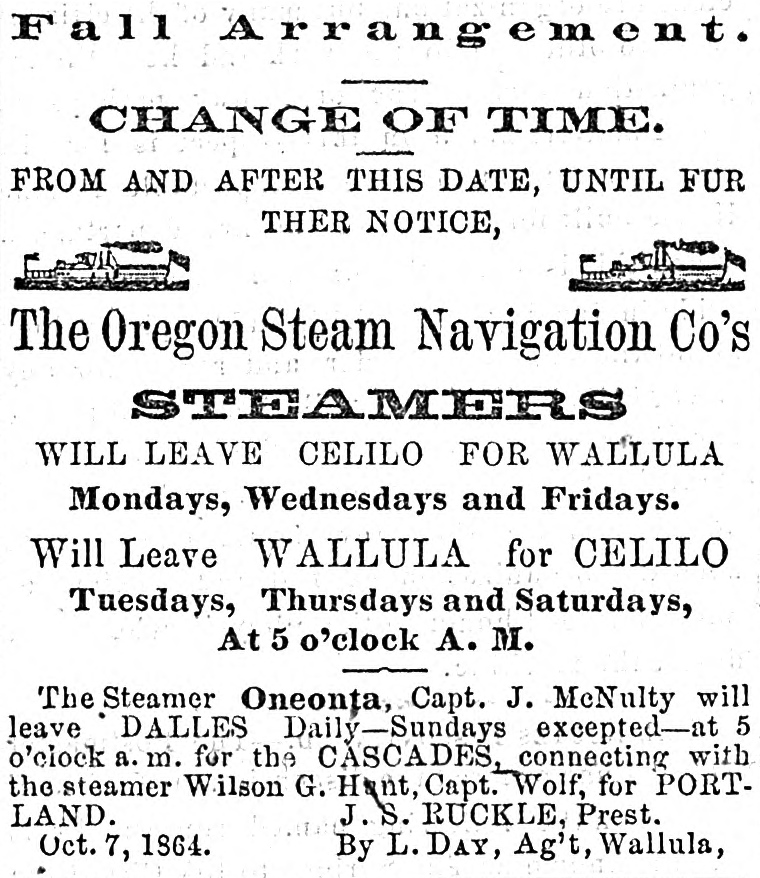
1865 advertisement in Walla Walla Statesman for Wilson G. Hunt and other steamers

Gold had been discovered in Idaho in the early 1860s, which led to the Hunt being bought in 1862 by the Oregon Steam Navigation Company and taken to the Columbia River. There the Hunt operated on the route from Portland, Oregon to the lower Cascades in command of Capt. John Wolf.

On the Columbia, Hunt was part of a chain of steamers that transported traffic between the portages around the rapids at the Cascades of the Columbia and the second longer set of rapids to the east of The Dalles. Each set of rapids enforced a requirement to portage traffic around the obstacle and control of the portages and ready transport across them was the key to control of the river traffic. Hunt's role in this system was to carry traffic up to the first portage at the Lower Cascades.

Hunt continued running on the Columbia until 1869, and during that time enjoyed a flourishing business, repeatedly carrying from 50 to 300 passengers, 100 head of stock and plenty of freight on a single trip. Her operating costs were high, but the demand for transport on the Columbia during the 1860s was so great that she was a very profitable boat. In 1869 the Oregon Steam Navigation Company, having achieved a monopoly on the Columbia River, decided to extend their steamboating ventures to Puget Sound.

== Renewed rate war on Puget Sound ==
The monopoly sent the old steamer around to run in opposition to Duncan B Finch and the Wright family, who were operating the Eliza Anderson, reputedly one of the slowest but most profitable vessels ever to traverse the Sound. Hunt arrived in February 1869 in command of Capt. W. I. Waitt, with Josiah Myrick, purser, Frank Dodge, freight clerk, Thomas Smith, chief engineer, James Gallegher, assistant, J. Smith, mate, and J. J. Holland, carpenter. The Hunt had been rebuilt in Portland in 1865 and was in good condition, but the company could not do much with her, and to save themselves from further loss sold her to Finch in October 1869. Finch and the Wrights had, in the meantime, built the steamer Olympia, afterward called the Princess Louise, and when the competition ended, the Hunt was sent to San Francisco where she remained for ten years.

== Return to Fraser River service ==
In 1878, the Hudson's Bay Company was running the Enterprise on the Fraser River run from Victoria. The company's rival on this route was Captain John Irving, who held a monopoly on steamboat traffic on the upper Fraser routes but was hindered by the company's activity on the lower river. In early 1878, Captain Irving travelled to San Francisco, where he found the Hunt and bought her for a cheap price. In February 1878 she was brought up by Captain Stoddard, cleaned up, repainted, and placed on the New Westminster route against Enterprise. The Hunt's Canadian registry number was 72676.

New Westminster's newspaper, the Mainland Guardian was impressed by the appearance of the then 30-year-old steamer:

The appearance of the vessel is undoubtedly most imposing. The wheels appear to be much larger than those of the Enterprise, and the new paint and gilding make her look as trim as if she'd just been turned out of a mould. The main saloon is 130 by 26 feet; ladies saloon 35 by 20 feet. The engine, 250 h.p. nominal ... She has 12 staterooms and can dine 100 at one table.

In July 1878 the Canadian government announced its decision that the transcontinental railroad would run down the Fraser River valley. There were over 5,000 tons of rails that had been piled up at Esquimalt for the construction of the Canadian Pacific's extension on Vancouver Island. On July 23, 1878, Wilson G. Hunt transported the first shipment of these rails to New Westminster, where they were loaded on Royal City and taken up to Yale. During 1878 the Hunt, under captains Irving, Insley, and Rudlin, continued to do well against the Enterprise. In October 1878 Hudson's Bay Company bought Hunt's old rival, Olympia, renamed her Princess Louise and after a put her on the New Westminster run against the Hunt Princess Louise was a far superior boat, and by the fall of 1879 the Company forced Captain Irving to come to terms, under which he and the Company operated Princess Louise, Wilson G. Hunt and Enterprise jointly under Irving's management as the Royal Mail Line.

== Vancouver Island service ==
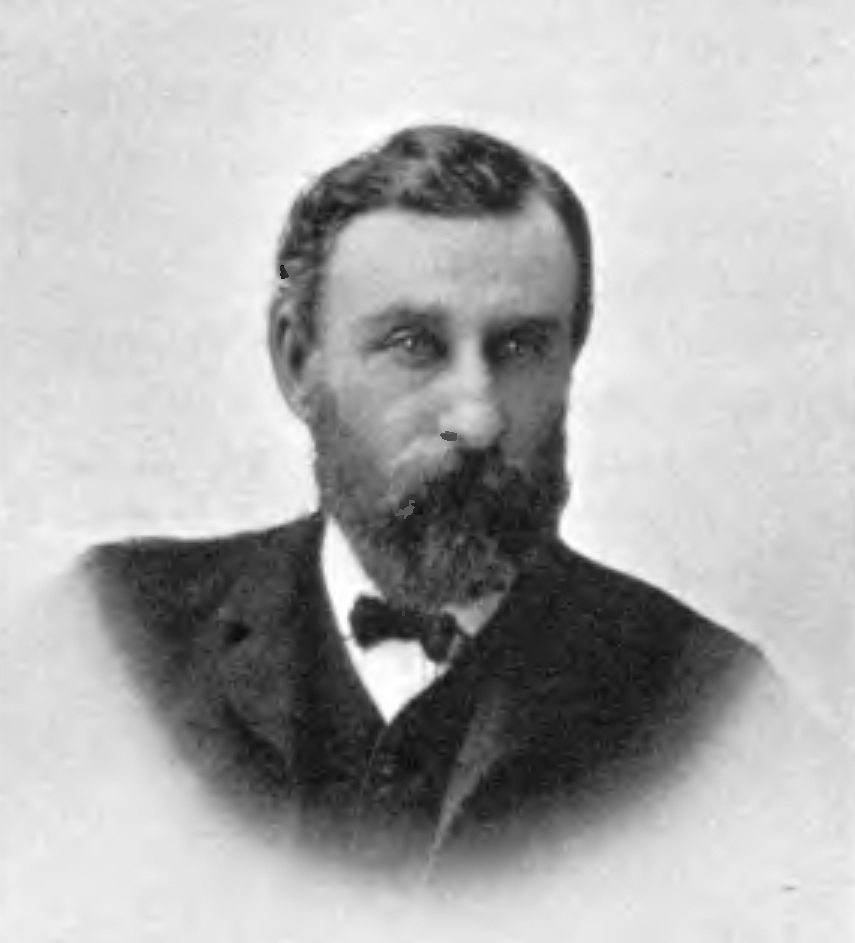
Capt. Joseph Spratt, last master of Wilson G. Hunt when the vessel was operational

Hunt was extensively repaired in 1879, and in 1881 was sold to Joseph Spratt, who was running the steamboats Maude and Caribou and Fly on the east coast of Vancouver Island as the East Coast Mail Line. Captain Spratt replaced Maude with Wilson G. Hunt on the route from Victoria to Comox and Nanaimo by way of the Gulf Islands and Chemainus.

By the end of 1883, Captain Spratt was forced to sell his East Coast Mail Company to Captain Irving's Canadian Pacific Navigation Company, in part because of serious mechanical problems with Wilson G. Hunt. While the public announcement by Captain Spratt, issued in the Victoria Colonist on December 8, 1883, was that the Wilson G. Hunt was only being withdrawn for repairs, in fact she had broken a shaft and was probably beyond repair.

There was a story that Captain Spratt had two men bailing her out to keep her from sinking at the dock in Victoria while he negotiated the sale to Captain Irving. This may have been true, but Spratt surely did not intend thereby to attempt to fool the astute Irving, who as Spratt well knew, was an excellent steamboat captain and had owned and commanded the Hunt before him. Irving replaced Hunt on the east coast route with Yosemite, another former California Gold Rush sidewheeler.

== Scrapped and burned for metal ==
In 1884, Hunt was laid up in Victoria's inner harbor. She stayed on the beach in front of Cook's shipyard until 1890, when she was broken up where she lay by the San Francisco junk dealers Cohn & Co., and burned for her metal. (Note: Timmen, at 159, clearly states that the Wilson G. Hunt proceeded to San Francisco in 1890 under her own power and was there broken up by Cohn & Co. This is contrary to Hacking, at 103, who states just as clearly that she was broken up and burned where she lay on the beach in Victoria.)

== Bibliography ==
=== References ===
- The Cooper Union Annual Reports, 1860–1884. New York: Cooper Union.
1. "The Twenty-Fifth Annual Report of the Trustees of the Cooper Union for the Advancement of Science and Art". Trow's Printing and Bookbinding Co. May 28, 1884.
  1. Via Cooper Archives.
- Hacking, Norman R[upert]; Lamb, William Kaye (1976) [1974]. The Princess Story – A Century and a Half of West Coast Shipping (2nd ed.). Vancouver: Mitchell Press. pp. 55, 75, 77, 83–84, 101–103, 338. LCCN 76-371729; ISBN 978-0-8883-6002-1, 0-8883-6002-9; OCLC 2152673 (all editions).
1. Via Internet Archive (Trent University).
- New York Times (The). LCCN sn78-4456, LCCN sn00-61556; ISSN 0362-4331, ISSN 1553-8095 (online); OCLC 1645522 (all editions).
1. "Death of Wilson G. Hunt — Once One of the Foremost of New-York Merchants — Connected with Many Important Enterprises and Well Known as a Financier – Estate of from Three to Six Millions – Some of It May Go for Charity" (obituary). Vol. 42, whole no. 12883. December 8, 1892. p. 10 (column 7, top). Retrieved June 14, 2018.
  1. NYTimes Archives → Blog.
  2. TimesMachine → Pdf (PDF); Permalink.
  3. Via Internet Archive (SIM Box ID: IA1661902, canister no. 01). IA Collection: SIM Microfilm; Periodicals; Pub: New York Times.
- The Rich Men of the World, and How They Gained Their Wealth – Exhibiting a Variety of Examples of Practical Business Success, Under Various Circumstances, Successful Speculations, etc., etc. – With Many Valuable Examples for Every Young Man. New York: Jesse Haney & Co. (Jesse Haney; 1829–1901). American News Company, General Agents. 17 April 1867. LCCN 74-187319.
1. "Wilson G. Hunt". pp. 60–62 – via Google Books (Harvard).
- Timmen, Fritz (1973). Blow for the Landing – A Hundred Years of Steam Navigation on the Waters of the West. Caldwell, Idaho: Caxton Printers. pp. 158–159. LCCN 73-150815; ISBN 0-8700-4221-1.
1. Via Internet Archive (San Francisco Public Library).
