= Flying Dutchman (sternwheeler) =

19th-century steamship

The Flying Dutchman was a 19th-century steamship in British Columbia and the Pacific Northwest. It was the first steamboat to enter the Stikine River, in 1862, and the first vessel to take a cargo of lumber from Burrard Inlet (Vancouver harbour), in August 1863, under Captain William Moore.
