= North Pacific (sidewheeler) =

19th century American steamboat

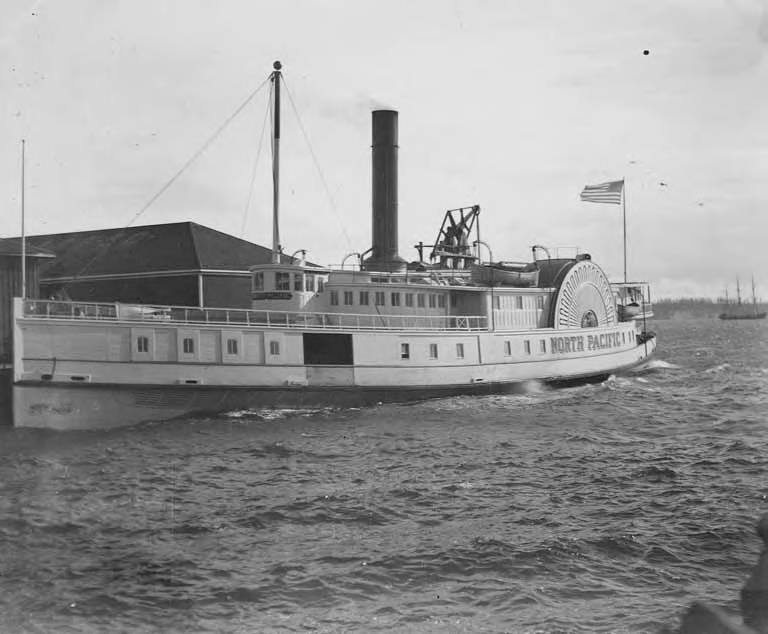
- North Pacific

History
- Name: North Pacific
- Owner: Starr Bros., Oregon Railway and Navigation Company
- Route: Puget Sound, Inside Passage, coastal British Columbia, Columbia River,
- Launched: 1871, at San Francisco, California
- Out of service: 1903
- Identification: US #18685
- Fate: Struck rock and sank off Marrowstone Point, 1903

General characteristics
- Type: inland steamship
- Tonnage: 488.73 GRT
- Length: 166 ft (50.60 m)
- Beam: 29 ft (8.84 m)
- Depth: 15.0 ft (4.57 m) depth of hold
- Installed power: Single-cylinder walking beam engine, 40-inch-diameter (1,000 mm) piston, 120-inch (3,000 mm)stroke
- Propulsion: sidewheels

North Pacific was an early steamboat operating in Puget Sound, on the Columbia River, and in British Columbia and Alaska. The vessel's nickname was "the White Schooner" which was not based on the vessel's rig, but rather on speed, as "to schoon" in nautical parlance originally meant to go fast.

== Design and construction ==
North Pacific was built in San Francisco for E.A. and L.M. Starr. The Starrs were pioneer businessmen in Portland. The Starrs had been unsuccessfully trying to compete with Finch and Wright, first with the sidewheeler Alida and then with the small steamer Isabel. The Starrs brought North Pacific to Puget Sound in 1871 to compete with the firm of D.B. Finch and Capt. Tom Wright (1828–1906). Finch and Wright had run the pioneer sidewheeler Eliza Anderson on the Sound, and had recently replaced the Anderson with the faster sidewheeler Olympia (later known as the Princess Louise).

North Pacific was 166.8 ft (50.84 m) long, with a beam of 29 ft (8.84 m) and 10.3 ft (3.14 m) depth of hold. North Pacific was assessed at 488.73 gross register tons, with "tons" in this instance being a measure of volume and not weight. The official merchant vessel registry number was 18685.

North Pacific was driven by a single-cylinder walking beam engine, 40-inch-diameter (1,000 mm) piston, 120-inch (3,000 mm) stroke

== Operation on Puget Sound ==
When North Pacific arrived at Puget Sound in June 1871, the vessel was considered to be the finest (and was certainly one of the largest) vessels yet to operate in the area. On June 27, 1871, North Pacific raced Olympia across the Strait of Juan de Fuca from Victoria, British Columbia to Port Townsend, Washington, beating Olympia by three minutes. A lot of money was wagered on the outcome, and the bets were paid off at Port Townsend. Newell described the scene:

The black smoke poured out of the paint-blistered funnels in marcelled black waves to streak away aft with the speed of the steamers. The great iron walking-beams blurred up and down while the thundering paddle-buckets churned the water at the ships' side into roaring waterfalls that tumbled astern to form broad white wakes on the blue straits.

The steamers continued racing however all the way to Olympia, Washington and the Olympia was able to edge out the North Pacific over this longer run. Even so, with the North Pacific the Starrs were finally able to best Finch and Wright, who accepted $7,500 from the Starrs to withdraw Olympia from the Puget Sound service, and take her south to California.

== Columbia River service ==
The Starrs left the steam navigation business in the onset of 1881 and sold North Pacific to the Oregon Railway and Navigation Company (known as the OR&N), which operated the vessel for a year on the Columbia River under Capt. O.A. Anderson (1842–1912).

== Return to Puget Sound ==
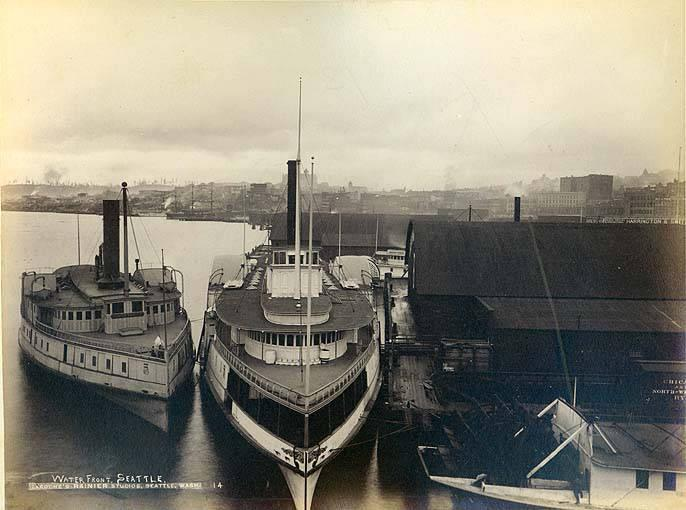
North Pacific on left and T.J. Potter on right, at Seattle, 1891

Afterwards, the O.R. & N returned North Pacific to Puget Sound, running the vessel on various routes and as a relief boat. In 1885, North Pacific made alternate runs with the large iron sidewheeler Olympian on the route from Puget Sound to Victoria. Later, apparently after suffering a broken walking-beam and blown out cylinder head, North Pacific was demoted to relief boat service on the Vancouver, British Columbia run for Olympian and Alaskan, another large sidewheeler which was near-sistership of Olympian.

== 1898 Alaska Gold Rush ==
During the 1898 Alaska Gold Rush, North Pacific made runs every 15 days from Seattle to Skagway and Dyea, Alaska, embarking 150 first class and 150 second class passengers and carrying 70 tons of freight on each trip. North Pacific's last Alaska trip began on April 28, 1898. On return was kept at Port Townsend, Washington before resuming service on Puget Sound. In 1899, Cary W. Cook bought North Pacific to replace Ocean Wave on the routes he was running from Puget Sound into British Columbia. In 1900, Cook formed the Western Steam Navigation Company at Tacoma, Washington to conduct the operations of North Pacific.

== Loss ==
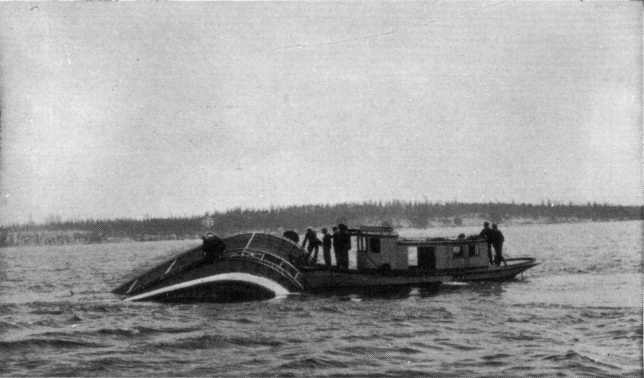
North Pacific sinking, with the Rothschild insurance launch alongside.

On July 18, 1903, running off Marrowstone Point in a fog, North Pacific went off course and struck a rock. The tug C.B. Smith heard the distress call of the old steamer (traditionally five blasts from the steam whistle) and was able to rescue all her passengers and crew. Later North Pacific drifted off the rock, sank in deep water (15 fathoms) and could not be raised. Coincidentally the running mate of the North Pacific, the steamboat Mainlander, was headed the opposite direction on the same route. Mainlander also grounded about an hour later near the place, but suffered only minor damage.
