= James William Troup =

American sailor (1855–1931)

Capt. James W. Troup as a young man

James William Troup (February 5, 1855 – November 30, 1931) was an American steamship captain, Canadian Pacific Railway administrator and shipping pioneer.

== Family ==
Captain James William Troup was born in Portland, Oregon in February, 1855. He was the son of Capt. Willam H. Troup, a prominent early steamboatman in the Pacific Northwest. His maternal grandfather was sailing ship Capt. John Turnball. James had a younger brother, Claud Troup (1865–1896) who was also an accomplished steamboat captain. James Troup also had a son, Roy Troup, who became a steamboat captain.

== Early career ==
Together with his father, Captain Troup built many of the early steamboats of the Columbia River and he went to work on the steamer Vancouver in 1872 at the age of 17.

By the age of 20 he was captain of the small propeller steamer Wasp, having served in every position from deckhand on up. Troup went to work on the Columbia river above the Cascades, for the Oregon Steam Navigation Company holding first a position as a purser and later as master. When the first Harvest Queen, a big new steamer was built in 1878, Troup was appointed her master, even though he was only 23 years of age.

In the early 1880s, as railways started to be completed along the Columbia River, the Oregon Railway and Navigation Company, which had bought out the O.S.N., started taking its boats off of the river to find employment for them elsewhere. This required running the rapids either at Celilo Falls, the Cascades, or both. In 1881, Troup ran Harvest Queen over Celilo Falls, where she was nearly wrecked, and then through the Cascades. In 1881, he also took Idaho through the Cascades.

== First work in British Columbia ==
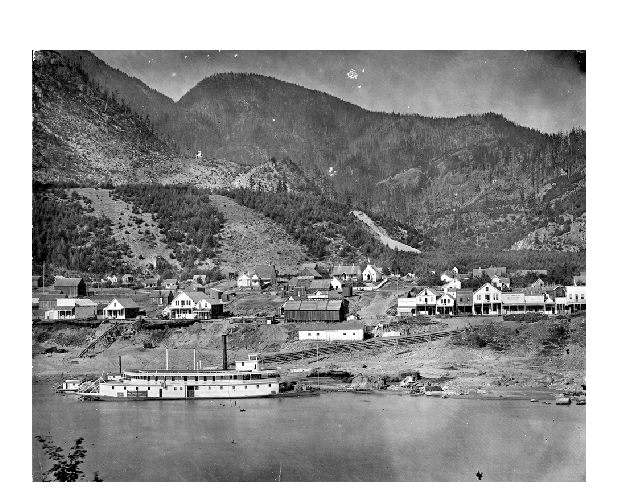
John Irving's William Irving at Yale (1882). Yale was the head of river navigation on the Lower Fraser.

In 1883 Troup began working in British Columbia for J. A. Mara, owner of the Peerless and Spallumcheen, two steamboats running on Kamloops and Shuswap lakes and the Thompson River. He also won the trust of Captain John Irving as a skilled steamboat captain, and was placed in charge of Irving's main steamer William Irving, named after Captain Irving's father. Irving also gave Troup command of the huge and difficult to manage sidewheeler Yosemite on the route from Victoria to New Westminster.

== Return to Oregon ==
He worked with John Irving and the Canadian Pacific Navigation Company until 1886, when he returned to Oregon to assume charge of the Oregon Railway and Navigation Company which was then owned by the Union Pacific. He worked in Oregon until 1892, and during this time he supervised construction of many steamboats, including the famous T.J. Potter. In 1891, Victorian was launched at Portland, Oregon. This ship was an extremely large vessel for one built entirely of wood. She was also underpowered, and became one of Troup's few design failures.

== Run of the Hassalo through the Cascades ==
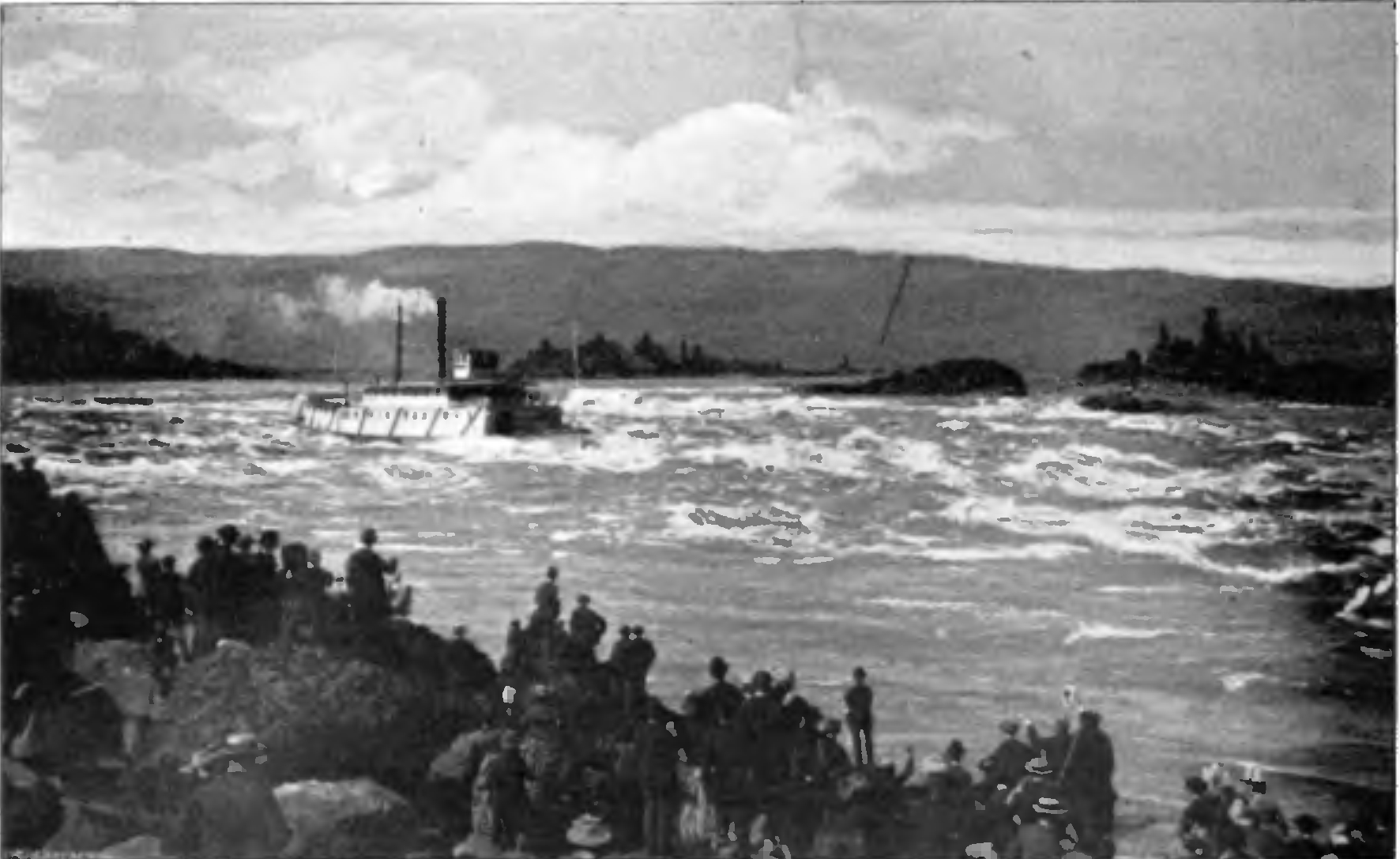
Hassalo running Cascades of the Columbia, May 26, 1888

On May 26, 1888, Troup took the sternwheeler Hassalo through the Cascades of the Columbia, covering the six miles of whitewater in just seven minutes. Other captains had come through the Cascades, and even bested Troup's time in doing so, as had notably Captain John McNulty (steamboat captain) in the R.R. Thompson over a half decade earlier and with a speed of steamboat passage through the rapids never again attained. Unlike the record run of the Thompson, though, the famous run of the Hassalo was witnessed by 3,000 people and made the subject of a well-known photograph.

== Steamboat operations in inland British Columbia ==
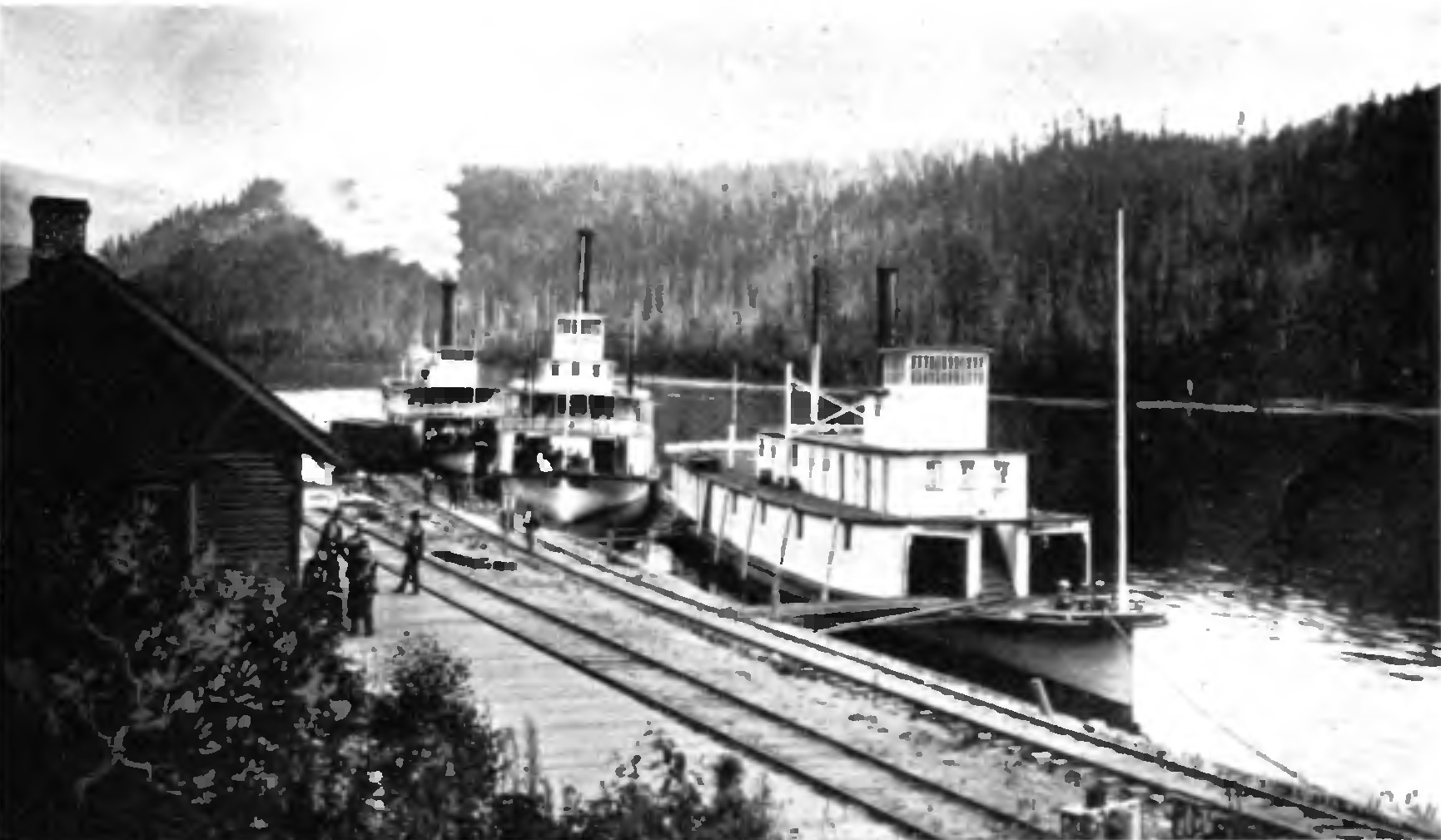
Lytton (in distance), Columbia (center), and Kootenai at Robson, BC, sometime between 1890 and 1894

While Troup was in Oregon, his old Canadian colleagues John Irving and J.A. Mara had joined with Frank S. Barnard and two others to form the Columbia and Kootenay Steam Navigation Company. Mara persuaded Troup to return to Canada and supervise his company's operations on the large inland lakes of British Columbia. Troup arrived back in Canada in March 1892 to take up his new post at Nelson, BC. He designed many of the inland steamboats used on the lakes, and each boat was specifically built for a particular task, such as towing or passenger work. As Professor Turner, a leading historian of British Columbia, states:

Captain James W. Troup was not one for taking half measures in steamship design although he was far from being an impractical man. Indeed his career was highlighted by a succession of ships that demonstrated his instinctive ability to understand the qualities needed in steamships to best capitalize on the traffic conditions. His vessel designs tended towards the fast and elegant although there were of course some utilitarian exceptions. They also developed reputations for good reliable performance and long service lives.

One of Troup's most successful designs was the steamer Rossland, which Professor Turner described as the most beautiful vessel ever to run on the Arrow Lakes. Like many prestigious steamers in the Pacific Northwest, such as the Wide West and the Bailey Gatzert, Rossland's saloon deck extended clear forward to her bow, and her pilot house was placed high above the water on top of the Texas. When Mara's company was bought out by the Canadian Pacific Railway, Troup continued in charge.

== Sternwheelers for the Klondike ==
When the Klondike Gold Rush generated a huge demand for shipping in 1898, the Canadian Pacific Railway (CPR) put Troup in charge of supervising steamboat construction. Troup went to Port Blakeley, Washington to supervise construction of four sternwheelers. These vessels were intended for service on the Yukon and Stikine rivers and were named Constantine, Walsh, Dalton, and Schwatka. Of these boats, only Schwatka made it to Alaska, and this was only in 1904. Constantine sank on the way while under tow, and Walsh and Dalton remained in Puget Sound and the Columbia River. Troup also supervised sternwheeler construction at False Creek, BC and Vancouver, BC. Only three of the Vancouver boats actually operated on the Stikine River, which was being boomed as the "All-Canadian" route to the Klondike gold fields. Troup then returned to the Kootenay district, where in 1901, he was made superintendent of both steamboat and rail lines.

== Superintendent of Canadian Pacific Steamships ==
In 1901, when the CPR bought John Irving's company, the Canadian Pacific Navigation Company, Troup was transferred to Victoria, B.C. to assume charge of the operation that his former employer John Irving had established:

For James Troup, the new British Columbia Coast Steamship Service was to be an all-consuming challenge for the remainder of his working life. He put his talents as a naval architect and his persuasive abilities to work immediately and convinced Canadian Pacific's management to build some of the finest coastal liners ever seen on the Pacific Coast.

Around this time, Five Mile Point (east of Nelson) on the Nelson and Fort Sheppard Railway was renamed Troup Junction in his honour.

Troup's long career was closely linked with the CPR from then onwards. In 1903, he was appointed Superintendent of the British Columbia Coast service of Canadian Pacific Railway.

The company was engaged in many struggles over the years, such as a bitter rate war in 1909 with the Puget Sound Navigation Company, headed by his friend Joshua Green. Both Troup and Green agreed never to discuss the rate war so that they would not become personally involved in the dispute between their companies.

Troup is credited with conceiving and building CPR's Princess fleet. In 1913, 10 of the 12 Princess ships in the coastal fleet had been built to the orders of Capt. Troup.

The worst blow for Captain Troup during his career with the CPR was the tragic sinking of the Princess Sophia. That ship had run ashore on Vanderbilt Reef in Lynn Canal on October 23, 1918 Though rescue vessels were at hand, it was too rough to take anyone off the Sophia, and she remained on the reef. During the night of October 25, the storm increased, and the Sophia was blown off the reef and sank, taking down with her all 343 people. The loss of the Sophia with so many people was the worst disaster in the history of the Canadian west coast and Inside Passage shipping. It deeply affected Captain Troup, causing him a breakdown in health which took him a long time to recover from.

== Last years ==
Captain Troup retired in August 1928. He was 73 years old, eight years past the CPR's mandatory retirement age. By this time the CPR had a fleet of profitable modern steamers serving the west coast of Canada, Alaska, and running down Puget Sound, all due in great part to the work of Captain Troup. In 1929, when he was 74 years old Captain Troup made his last whitewater run when the captain of the Lewiston showed Troup the high honor of asking him to pilot her through the lower Cascades. Captain Troup died on November 30, 1931. No other man contributed more to the maritime commerce of the Pacific Northwest.

== Loyalty to Captain Irving ==
Perhaps Captain Troup's only equal in achievement and esteem was his good friend and old employer, John Irving, who lived on until 1936. Like Troup, Captain Irving had led a life of adventure and challenge, but he was an improvident man who gave away or gambled through his fortune. His only son had been killed in World War I, and the broken-hearted Irving, well over military age, had offered to take his place in Canada's armed forces. In later years Captain Irving was so destitute that he seemed to have no home. CPR had granted Irving the right of free travel on its ships in 1901 when he sold his firm to them. With no real residence onshore, Captain Irving used his right of travel constantly, so much so that he was practically living on CPR's ships.

There might have been some question as to whether the right of travel extended so far as Captain Irving was taking it, but for so long as Captain Troup was superintendent of the CPR, steamships, he made sure that Captain Irving was always welcome on every ship in the fleet. After Troup retired, his successor tried to curtail Captain Irving's travels by decreeing that passage might be free, but Irving would have to pay for meals and a berth. This edict was always ignored by the line's captains, and Captain Irving always had a cabin and was welcome at every captain's table, as Captain Troup had wished it.
