= Irving House =

Historical house in New Westminster, British Columbia, Canada

Coordinates: 49.207812°N 122.906268°W

The Irving House is a heritage site residing in New Westminster, British Columbia. It is a one and a half storey tall building which is known to be the oldest house in the Lower Mainland that is still completely intact. It is located at the corner of Royal Avenue and Merivale Street in its original location. Today, it is a museum open to the public for those who wish to explore colonial history during the time of pioneer expansion in the Lower Mainland.

== History ==
The home was built by Captain William Irving in 1865 to house his family of a wife and five children. It was built during a time when the city of New Westminster was beginning to be constructed after the dissolving of the Royal Engineers in 1863. Since the house's construction, it has housed three generations of the Irving family until 1950. After this date, the City of New Westminster established the home as a heritage site and transformed it into a museum with the goal of educating the local public about the colonial history of the city.

In 2009, staff at the museum discovered papers in the house's upper hallway and entrance that were estimated to have been created between the years 1897–1903. Upon this discovery, they were redone, printed in England, and then reshipped back to the home for installation. The house, since 2011, has undergone a number of restorations such as a modern fire and electrical system. Along with this, the house's infrastructure was restored as part of a project to restore its original appearance. An example of this is the repairing and repainting of the house's exterior, along with the restoration of the house's original gold wallpapers in April 2018. More work to complete its full restoration can be expected in the future.

== Features ==
- 4700 square feet, consisting of 14 rooms.
- Built with a brick foundation and wooden construction.
- Gothic Revival style architecture.
- Metallic gold wallpapers.
