= Canadian Pacific Navigation Company =

Canadian steamship company

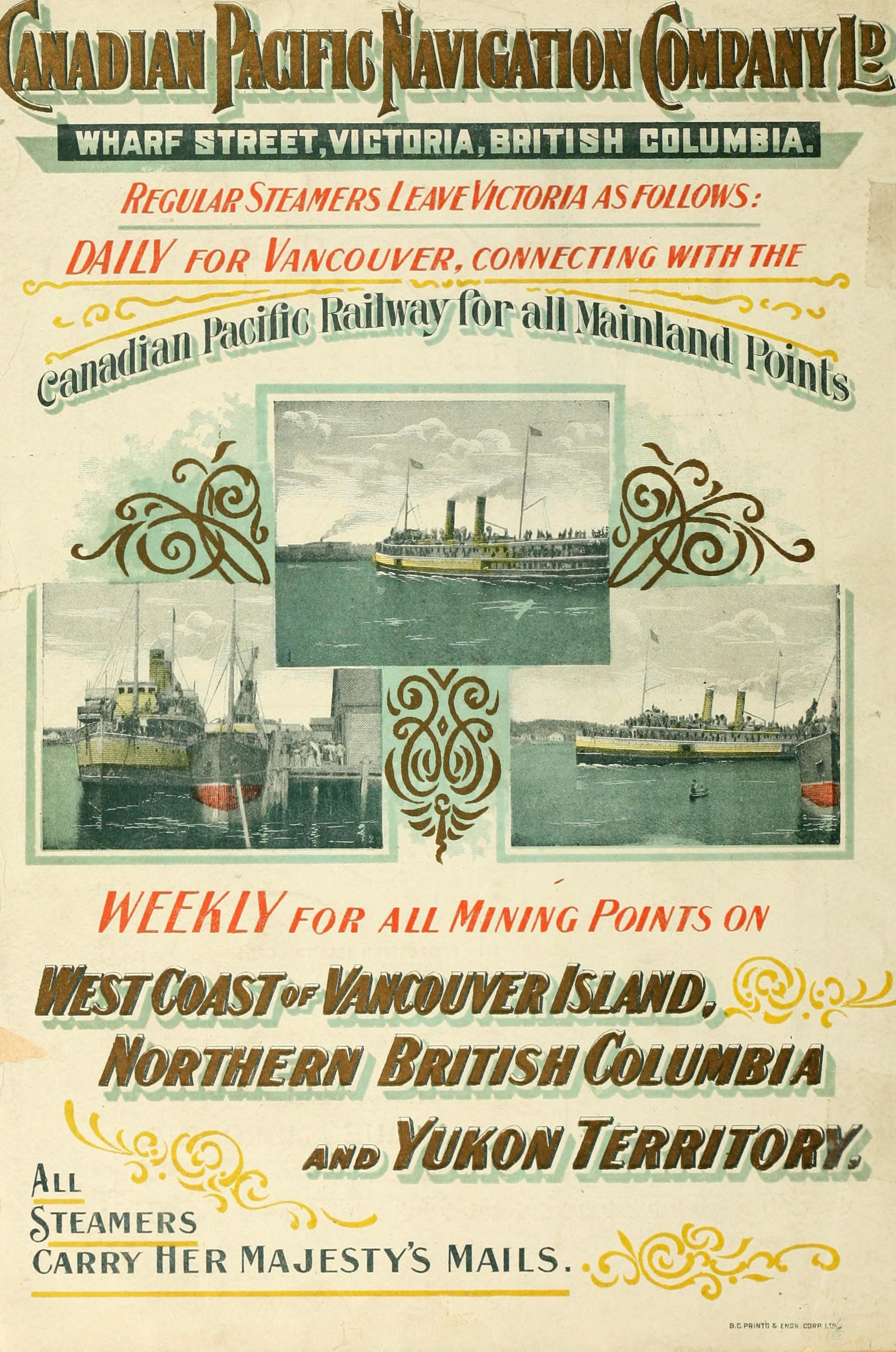
- Advertisement for Canadian Pacific Navigation Co., December 1899, from the BC Mining Record
- Founded: 1883
- Defunct: 1901
- Fate: Merged into successor corporation
- Successor: Canadian Pacific Railway
- Headquarters: Victoria, British Columbia

The Canadian Pacific Navigation Company was an early steamship company that operated steamships on the coast of British Columbia and the Inside Passage of southeast Alaska. The company was founded in 1883 by John Irving (1854–1936), a prominent steamboat man, businessman, and politician of early British Columbia. In 1901, the company was purchased by the Canadian Pacific Railway, becoming the steamship division of the CPR.

== Ships ==
The company owned a variety of vessels, including the sternwheeler Princess Louise, R.P. Rithet, the old sidewheelers Wilson G. Hunt and Yosemite, and the coastal steamer Willapa.

== Loss of SS Islander ==
Another ship owned by the company was the steamship Islander, which went down in August 1901. Islander was a steel twin-screw steamer built for the Inside passage to Alaska and favoured by wealthy travelers. On the morning of August 15, 1901, the ship struck a submerged iceberg and went down off the south end of Douglas Island, British Columbia. 40 passengers and crew were lost, including the wife and daughter of the politician James Hamilton Ross.
