= William Moore (steamship captain) =

Steamship captain, businessman, miner and explorer

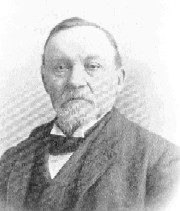
- Captain William Moore
- Born: 5 June 1825; Emden, Kingdom of Hanover
- Died: 29 March 1909 (aged 83 years, 9 months, 23 days); Victoria, British Columbia, Canada
- Occupation(s): steamship captain, businessman, explorer
- Spouse: Hendrica Mary Roskamp 1827-1911
- Children: John William 1847-1933, Henry William 1849-1850, Wilhelmina C. 1850-1861, William Domingo 1854-1945, Henrietta Marcella 1857-1934, Henry William 1860-1886, Wilhelmina 1862-1921, James Bernard "Ben" 1865-1919 and Gertrude 1870-1933

William Moore (5 June 1825 – 29 March 1909) was a steamship captain, businessman, miner and explorer in British Columbia and Alaska. During most of British Columbia's gold rushes (from the Queen Charlottes in 1852 until the Cassiar Gold Rush in 1872) Moore could be found at the center of activity, either providing transportation to the miners, working claims or delivering mail and supplies.

In 1887, guided by First Nation's explorer Skookum Jim (who later co-discovered the Klondike Goldfields), Moore was guided through the White Pass route that would become a famous route to the Klondike Gold Rush and purchased the land that later became the famous gold rush town of Skagway. Throughout his 83 years, he would father five sons and four daughters and make and lose at least three separate fortunes. His friends and rivals would give him many nicknames, among them, "Buddy" and "The Flying Dutchman".

== Early years ==
Moore was born in the Northern German port city of Emden on 30 March 1822. By the age of seven, he was sailing on schooners on the North Sea and by age 24, his adventures brought him to New Orleans, Louisiana.

=== New Orleans and San Francisco ===
In New Orleans, Moore married Hendrika in 1846 and worked on riverboats on the Mississippi River. In 1848, he served in the Mexican–American War aboard the USS Lawrence. That same year, he became a citizen of the United States and his eldest son, John (JW), was born. In 1851, he moved his family to San Francisco, but arrived too late to participate in the California Gold Rush.

=== Queen Charlotte Islands and Peru ===
In 1852, Moore and his family left San Francisco on the brig Tepic for the Queen Charlotte Islands where gold had been discovered on Moresby Island.

After a month of fruitless prospecting, the Moores returned to San Francisco. Not one to sit for long, William became intrigued by the wealth of the Incas and he packed up his wife and son and embarked to Peru, where he purchased a schooner and traded up and down the Peruvian coast. In 1854, his second son, William D. Moore (Billie), was born at Callao. However, Hendrika was frightened by the ongoing revolutions in Peru, and they returned to San Francisco in 1856. Moore purchased property on Goat Island and raised goats. Also in 1856, his third child, daughter Henrietta, was born.

== British Columbia ==
=== Fraser Canyon Gold Rush ===
In 1858, Moore heard the news of the gold discoveries on the Fraser River in British Columbia. He immediately sold his Goat Island property, packed up his livestock (mostly goats) and family onto his schooner and embarked for Victoria, where he would build the family home and have a fourth child, son Henry. Upon his arrival, Moore built a 15-ton barge named Blue Bird. As 30,000 gold-seekers poured into what would soon be the Colony of British Columbia, Moore made his first fortune, not in mining, but in providing transportation for the miners and delivering their supplies up the Fraser River to Fort Hope. In 1859, he replaced the cumbersome barge with a sternwheeler named the Henrietta, built by James Trahey at Victoria and launched in October. To pilot her, Moore hired Captain John Deighton, also known as "Gassy Jack", who would later be renowned as the first resident of Granville, which would become Vancouver.

The Henrietta navigated the Fraser River to Yale in February 1860, but Moore soon replaced her with a new and more powerful sternwheeler, the Flying Dutchman, which was launched in Victoria that September. She operated on the Harrison Lake route between "Harrisonmouth" (since named Harrison Mills) and Port Douglas. New Westminster soon had an opportunity to be grateful to Captain Moore, when the bitterly cold winter of 1861–62 froze the Fraser River from Lulu Island to Hope and isolated New Westminster from December until 12 March, when Moore used the Flying Dutchman paddlewheel first and spent three days smashing a passage through the ice so supplies could be delivered to the little community.

Nevertheless, that spring the competition on the Fraser River resulted in rate wars between Moore and his main rival, Captain William Irving, so Moore began looking for greener pastures and soon found one on the Stikine River, which he was the first to navigate by sternwheeler.

=== Stikine Gold Rush ===
In 1862, when Moore learned of the gold discovery on the Stikine River, he built another barge, the JW Moore and packed the Flying Dutchman with 60 passengers and towed the barge 300 perilous miles up the coast to Fort Stikine which lay at the entrance to the Stikine River. Undeterred by the Stikine's reputation for being a dangerous river, Moore took the Flying Dutchman, with the JW Moore in tow, up to Buck's Bar without incident, making the 140-mile (230 km) journey in only three days. Having a monopoly on the Stikine, Moore charged $100 a ton for freight, and $20 fare per man, plus a 5-cent per pound baggage fee. Meals and berths were extra. During the 1862 season, he made a profit of $20,000 (~$475,759 in 2023). He returned to Victoria that fall and met his fifth child, daughter Wilhemina.

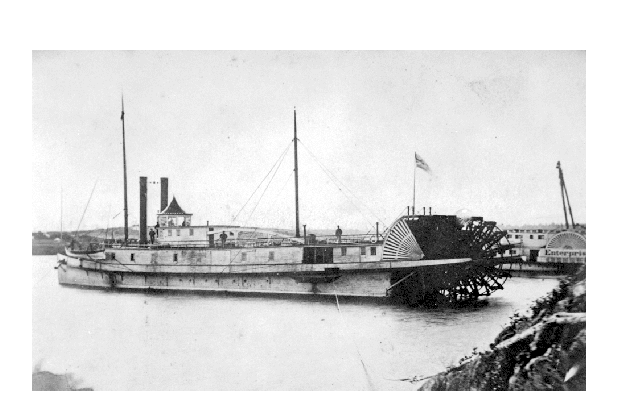
Moore's Alexandra on the Fraser River in 1864

In 1863, Moore returned the JW Moore and the Flying Dutchman to the Fraser River and, deciding to invest his Stikine fortune, ordered another sternwheeler from James Trahey, the Alexandra, which (having two funnels) was styled in the manner of Mississippi paddle steamers and would be the largest steamboat to that date on the Fraser. Moore intended for her to run from Victoria to Yale, connecting with the Flying Dutchman on Harrison Lake, but the Alexandra proved to be too big and expensive to operate and only made a few trips on that route. Moore suffered additional financial hardship as rate wars raged between him and his rival, William Irving, driving steamer fares down to as low as 25 cents for the trip between New Westminster and Yale. The rivalry involved Victoria and New Westminster as well, as Moore was from the former and Irving from the latter. The rivalry between the towns reached new heights when insults were traded in the local papers, with New Westminster saying that Victoria was "built on a frogpond" and Victoria retorting that New Westminster was "a pimple on the face of creation".

By 1865, Moore had lost the Flying Dutchman and the Alexandra and declared bankruptcy. Moore was not out of business for long, however, and soon purchased another sloop and moved his family and their goats to New Westminster, where Hendrika had their sixth child, son Bernard. Moore then purchased the barge Lady of the Lake, equipped it with sails and renamed it Marcella and ran it from New Westminster through Puget Sound to Olympia, Washington.

=== Big Bend Gold Rush ===
Early in 1866, Moore learned of the gold discoveries at Big Bend and put in a tender for the contract to run steamer service from Savona on Kamloops Lake to Seymour City (Seymour Arm) on Shuswap Lake, but his rival, Captain Irving, won the contract. Moore decided to purchase another barge and ran it on that route with his eldest son, John. The Big Bend Gold Rush ended shortly afterwards, and Moore purchased land in Kamloops and his family, with their omnipresent goats, joined him there, ironically making part of the trip on Captain Irving's sternwheeler, Onward.

=== Cariboo Gold Rush ===
Later in that spring of 1866, Moore had already had enough of farming and moved his family up to Barkerville, where he worked as a miner until 1869, when he learned of yet another new gold discovery, this time in the Omineca Country.

=== Omineca Gold Rush ===
In 1869, Moore moved his family and goats to Quesnel and built another barge. In the spring of 1870, the barge was completed and Hendrika took the youngest children to Victoria, while eldest sons John and Billie stayed behind. Billie would work for a merchant in Quesnel, while John accompanied his father on the barge. It was loaded with supplies and hauled 230 miles (370 km) up north via the Fraser, Nechako, and Stuart Rivers and through Stuart Lake onto Tachie River to Trembleur Lake to Middle River, finally arriving at Takla Lake where Takla Landing led to the trails to the Omineca diggings. After delivering the supplies, Moore and John began prospecting, but had no luck, and come winter, they left the barge on Takla Lake and took the Babine trail to Hazelton, canoeing down the Skeena River to the coast, where they took the steamship Otter back to Victoria. In the spring of 1871, Moore built another schooner, the Minnie, and loaded her with more supplies for the Omineca district and went up the coast, accompanied by his sons, John and Henry, a crew of thirty men, and a herd of mules. But even an experienced riverboat captain like Moore could not ascend the entire length of the perilous and swift Skeena River with a loaded barge. Facing starvation, his crew left, and Moore and his sons had to drive the mules the remaining 90 miles (140 km) to Hazelton on foot. Taking the Babine trail back to Takla, they were joined by Billie, and the four Moores ran the barge and the pack mules for the Omineca miners for the rest of that season. They returned to Victoria that fall and embarked to Omenica again in the spring of 1872, with a contract from the Hudson's Bay Company to freight supplies up the Skeena to Hazelton. At Port Essington, Moore built two more barges and two large canoes, and hired 24 First Nations men of the Haida, Tongass and Tsimpsean tribes: 12 to crew the barges and 12 more to man the canoes. William captained the first barge, John, the second, while Bille and Henry each captained a canoe. After navigating through the treacherous Kitselas Canyon, where the barges had to be pulled and pried through foot by foot, the party was met by local man Tom Hankin, who warned them that the tribe based at the Kitsequekla Canyon, whom he called "Sticks", were hostile, as their village had been accidentally burnt down by some white miners. Despite the warning, and the uneasiness of his crew of Coast natives, (who were not friendly with this particular tribe either), Moore armed everyone with muskets and proceeded to the next canyon. As they navigated up the canyon, the Sticks threatened to fight unless Moore paid for his passage, but Moore refused, explaining that the goods were not his, and that the government would pay for the losses they incurred when their village was destroyed. The Sticks clearly did not think much of Moore's argument, but seeing that everyone was armed and knowing that three of their own chiefs were currently on the coast, they eventually allowed the flotilla to pass. Once they arrived in Hazelton, John took the mules up the Babine trail while Moore, Billie, Henry and their crew returned down the Skeena to pick up another load. When they were floating past the Kitsequekla Canyon, shots were fired and one of the crewmen was wounded in the leg, while another bullet barely missed Moore. One of Moore's crew fired back, but most of their attention had to be kept on guiding the canoes and barges through the canyon, which they navigated without further incident. Upon their return at Port Essington, they learned that the government, having heard of burning of the Sticks village, had sent Lieutenant-Governor Joseph Trutch in a gunboat, HMS Scout. Trutch met with the chiefs and explained that the fire had been an accident and gave them $600 as compensation. Moore made three more trips to Hazelton that summer and then he sent John up to the Nass River with a team of pack mules, while he, Billy and Henry took the barges back to Port Essington and took the Minnie up the coast to the Nass, where they met with John again. The boys spent the winter 15 miles (24 km) south of Woodcock Landing in a cabin by what is now Moore's Cove. Moore himself returned to Victoria to be with his wife and daughters. But, by the next spring, Moore heard of yet another gold discovery and wrote the boys and told them to get ready to go to the Cassiar.

=== Cassiar Gold Rush ===
In April 1873, Moore met his three sons at Port Essington, where they loaded the Minnie and a barge up with supplies and took them 200 miles (320 km) north up to Fort Wrangell and then 75 miles (121 km) up the Stikine River, leaving the Minnie onshore. There they were joined by six prospectors and two First Nations guides, who all boarded the barge and with much towing, rowing and sailing, the group covered the last 75 miles (121 km) to Telegraph Creek. Once there, they all continued on foot, carrying their supplies in heavy backpacks through swamps and streams for 28 days until they reached the diggings on Dease Lake. Moore and his son's continued packing supplies into the area until they came across Thibert Creek and met Harry Thibert and his party, who were recovering 3 to 6 ounces of gold per day. Moore and his sons staked claims nearby and by 18 September, they had recovered $5000 in gold. By then, there was snow on the ground and they went back to Victoria for the winter. Moore was not idle however; he convinced the government that a pack trail needed to be built between Telegraph Creek and Dease Lake. He was awarded the contract and in partnership with Victoria merchant, Morris Lenz, built the trail and operated a mule team over it. By the fall of 1874, the Cassiar Gold Rush was in full swing, and Moore and his three sons had made an astounding $100,000 (~$2.43 million in 2023) from their claims. Moore wasted no time in investing the money and ordered a new sternwheeler, the Gertrude, which was launched at Victoria on 22 March 1875. Youngest son Bernard, (Ben), now ten, was considered old enough to join the rest of the men in the family on the northern rivers and worked on the Gertrude with his father and brother, Billie, while Henry and John worked at the placer mines.

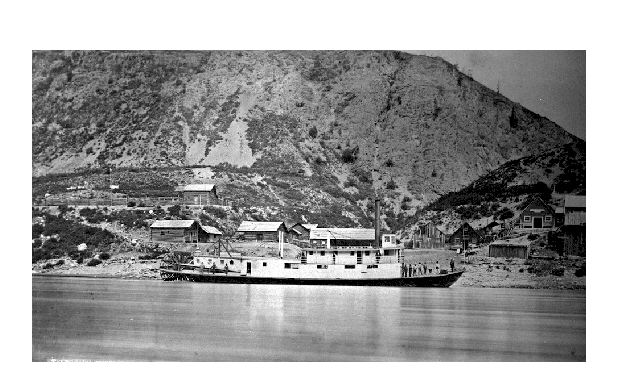
Moore's Gertrude at Telegraph Creek 1882

That fall, Moore took the Gertrude back to his old stomping grounds on the Fraser River. Although his old rival, William Irving, had died in 1872, Irving's son John, had taken over the family business, and was proving that he could admirably fill his father's shoes. Moore ran the Gertrude against Irving's Royal City for a few weeks, creating a rate war that would lower fares to $1 between New Westminster and Yale. Seeing there was no money to be made that way, Moore laid the Gertrude up at Victoria and turned to other matters. He purchased an old British gunboat, the Grappler, five Victoria waterfront lots and one of John Irving's sternwheelers, the Glenora, with the understanding that Irving would stay away from the Stikine River. During 1876, Moore's business flourished as the Grappler took miners and supplies from Victoria up the coast to Fort Wrangell, where they met the Gertrude, which Moore piloted, and the Glenora, which Billie piloted, taking the miners and supplies up the Stikine to Telegraph Creek. However, by the end of the season, the rush was nearing its end and Moore sold his claims to a syndicate of Chinese miners and returned to Victoria.

=== Revisit to Fraser River ===
In 1877, Moore returned yet again to the Fraser River and ran the Gertrude against John Irving's Reliance, but in 1878 he returned to the Stikine in time to fight off more new competition there, the Nellie owned by John Calbreath, the packer and storekeeper who'd been responsible for bringing the infamous Cariboo camels to the Cariboo in 1862. Now that there was competition in the Cassiar, his thoughts returned to the Fraser again and the idea of running against Irving on the route from New Westminster to Yale.

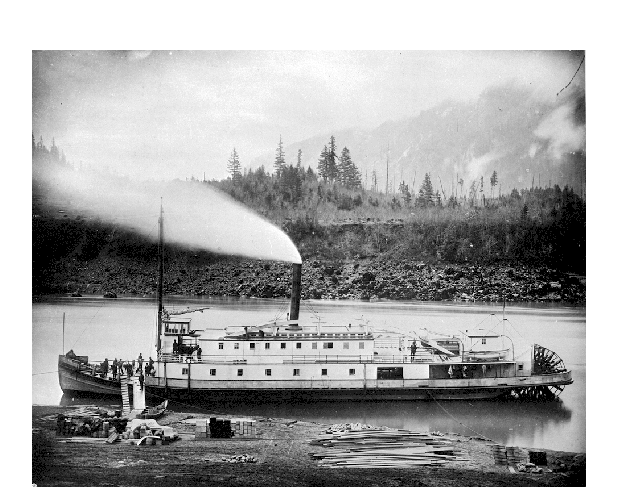
Moore's Western Slope at Yale

So, in 1879, Moore built another new sternwheeler, the Western Slope, which was launched at Victoria on 8 May. The old rivalry ran hot as Moore's and Irving's sternwheelers raced up and down the Fraser, competing for passengers. To compete with Moore, Irving built a new sternwheeler in 1881, the $80,000 Elizabeth J Irving, which on its second trip to Yale, raced Moore's Western Slope and, midway through the race, caught on fire and was soon reduced to a charred wreck, resulting in the deaths of four First Nations crewmen, two horses and two cows. The loss was a tremendous blow to John Irving, who had just allowed the vessel's insurance to expire a week earlier.

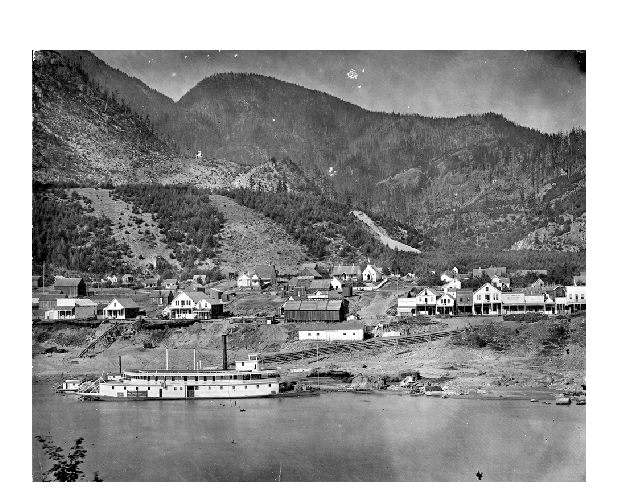
John Irving's William Irving at Yale

.

In 1882, Moore sold the Gertrude and built the Pacific Slope, but by the end of the year, he had fallen on hard times again and sold the Pacific Slope to Andrew Onderdonk and declared bankruptcy again, losing not only his sternwheelers, but also his home and properties in Victoria. John Irving purchased the Western Slope at auction, and being a man of great honor, hired Billie to be her captain, Henry her mate and John her purser, thus helping his rival's family remain solvent. William Moore, now 60, was hardly ready to become an employee of his old rival's 28-year-old son, so he built another sternwheeler, the Teaser, which was eventually seized by creditors (despite Billie's attempt to hide her in Alaska), and sold and renamed the Rainbow. The engine of the Teaser was built by the Moran Brothers in Seattle.

Meanwhile, Moore built the Alaskan and took her up to the Stikine, which he now had to himself for the 1885 season of navigation. In 1886, Moore heard the call of gold again and went up to the Yukon River. Henry was to meet him there, but was tragically murdered on Vancouver Island on his schooner along with three companions. He left behind a wife and four children.

By 1887, Moore joined the government survey party headed by William Ogilvie and showed them how to build and navigate a barge up the Yukon River. Once the party got to the Chilkoot Pass, Moore heard tales of another route to the Yukon and, with Skookum Jim, started up the Skagway River and went over the 45-mile (72 km) long pass, meeting up with the Oglivie party at Bennett Lake. When Oglivie heard of this new route, he named it White Pass, after Thomas White, the Minister of the Interior. Moore then told Ogilvie of his belief that the Yukon Valley would be the site of the next gold rush and that the White Pass would be a major route to it.

== Alaska ==
By the fall of 1887, after traveling through the White Pass to Lake Bennett, Moore somehow knew that gold would soon be discovered in the Yukon and wasted no time in preparing for the day his prediction would come to pass. With his son, Ben, Moore struck out for Juneau, Alaska by canoe. When they passed what would later be named Skagway, Moore noted that it would be a good place for a wharf. Loading up with supplies in Juneau, they swiftly returned through the Lynn Canal to Skagway Bay where Moore preempted 160 acres (0.65 km^{2}) at the mouth of the Skagway River at a place the Tlingit called Skagua, and named it Mooresville. He built a log cabin, a sawmill, and began the construction of a wharf in anticipation of the ships that would land there, offloading thousands of eager gold-seekers. He and Ben returned to Victoria in that winter where Moore wrote several letters to Ottawa, telling of the Yukon's great potential and the need for a wagon road over the White Pass. His letters were ignored. Undaunted, as always, Moore returned to his property every summer and freighted through the Lynn Canal with his new sternwheeler, another Flying Dutchman. In 1891, he asked the United States Secretary of the Interior for a contract to build a road through the White Pass, and again, his request was ignored.

In 1896, when Moore was 74, he won the mail contract to deliver the mail on the 600-mile (970 km) long route from Juneau to Forty Mile, Yukon. On one mail trip he met George Carmack, who had just staked a claim on a small creek named Rabbit Creek, soon to be Bonanza Creek, just off of the Klondike River. Moore's prediction was about to come true.

=== Klondike Gold Rush ===
On 29 July 1897, the mail steamer Queen would be the first of the gold rush flotilla to dock at Moore's wharf in Skagway Bay, followed by John Irving's Islander and the collier Willamette. Skagway, Alaska was born and became a boomtown overnight. Originally the Indians called it Skagua, Moore renamed it Mooresville and the stampeders took over and named it Skaguay, later spelled Skagway. What Moore did not anticipate was the lack of concern for his legal rights in ownership of the land Skagway sat upon. The residents and stampeders that made up the population pushed Moore aside and took over ownership of his land. When streets were surveyed it was found that Moore's home stood directly in its path. Moore put up a fight but in the end his home was uprooted and moved to another location. Moore brought suit against the claim jumpers who remained in town after the rush and, in 1901, won a 25% reimbursement.

In 1900, Moore would make one final prospecting trip, this time to Nome, Alaska, however, he soon returned to Skagway and built a house on Skagway Bay. On top of the house he built a room fashioned in the style of a pilot-house where he could look out at the ships in the bay. He died nine years later, in Victoria on 29 March 1909 aged 87.
