= William Irving (steamship captain) =

Scottish steamship captain and entrepreneur (1816–1872)

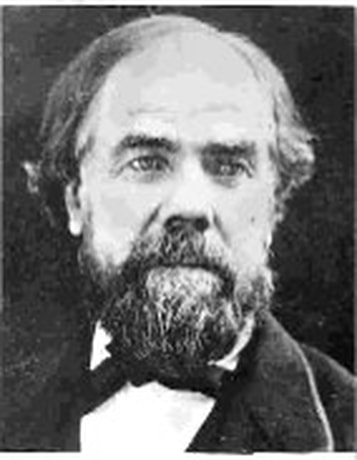
- William Irving
- Born: 1816; Annan, Dumfriesshire Scotland
- Died: August 28, 1872 (aged 55–56); New Westminster, British Columbia
- Occupation: steamship captain
- Spouse: Elizabeth Dixon
- Children: Mary, John 1854, Susan, Elizabeth, Nellie

William Irving was a steamship captain and entrepreneur in Oregon, US and British Columbia, Canada. The Irvington neighborhood in Portland, Oregon, is named in his honor and in New Westminster, British Columbia, his home, "Irving House", is now a heritage site. He was one of the earliest pioneers of steamer travel in the Pacific Northwest and is remembered as one of the most successful and popular captains of the era.

== Early years ==
William Irving was born in 1816 in Annan, Dumfriesshire Scotland. In 1831, he journeyed to Boston, Massachusetts, and by the age of twenty-five he was a licensed steamship captain.

== Oregon ==
In 1849 he traveled to Oregon, stopping along the way in Sacramento, California, where he worked unloading cargo during the California Gold Rush before continuing on to Portland. He purchased Block 12 of the Portland townsite and began a transportation business that delivered lumber by steamer up from California to Portland.

In 1851 he married 18-year-old Elizabeth Dixon who had just arrived in Oregon from Indiana the previous year. William built his new bride a large house along the river and they stayed there for nine years and had five children: Mary, John, Susan, Elizabeth, and Nellie.

When the family moved to British Columbia in 1859, their Portland home was taken over by Elizabeth's sister and her husband, George Shaver and would be called the "Shaver House".

After his death in 1872, his wife would return to Portland and continue to manage the family's holdings. His daughter Elizabeth would marry and also build a home in the neighborhood in 1884, named the "Spencer House", which still exists today and has the honor of being the oldest in the neighborhood.

== British Columbia ==
In 1859, William Irving and his family moved to Victoria, where he became a partner in the Victoria Steam Navigation Company and built two sternwheelers, the Governor Douglas and the Colonel Moody to serve between New Westminster and Victoria. However, Irving did not have a monopoly on the route and rate wars soon erupted between him and his main rival, Captain William Moore who was running his Henrietta on the same route. By that September, freight rates, which had begun at $12 at ton, dropped to 50 cents a ton and fares, which had been $10 a passenger also dropped to 50 cents.

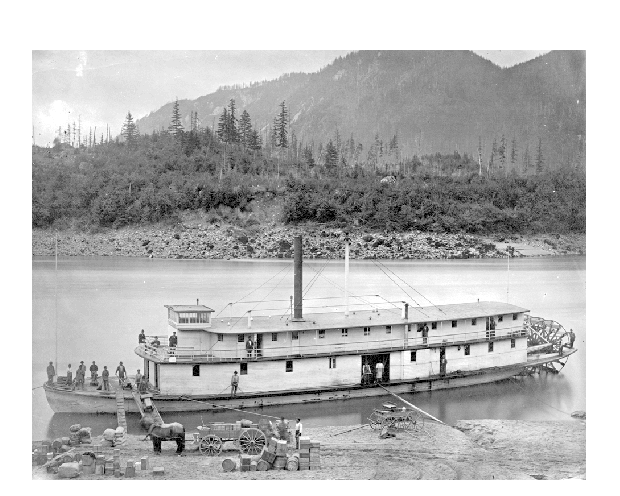
Irving's Reliance at Yale (1880)

By 1860, when the Fraser Canyon Gold Rush was starting to decline, more than a dozen sternwheelers were working on the Fraser River between New Westminster, Fort Hope and Port Douglas and more were arriving from American waters or were being built locally. Finally the individual owners got together and put an end to the rivalry by cooperatively increasing their rates.

In 1862, news of the gold strikes in the Cariboo Gold Rush brought 4,000 miners to the area and the rate wars began anew. Irving sold his boats to John Wright and William Moore left to go work on the Stikine River, briefly putting an end to their rivalry. Irving immediately had another sternwheeler built, the Reliance and was kept busy shipping miners and supplies to Yale where they could travel on the nearly completed Cariboo Wagon Road to the goldfields at Barkerville.

In 1863 and '64 rate wars erupted again when Irving's old rival, Moore returned from the Stikine River, rich with profits and ready to take on the new Reliance with his Flying Dutchman and Alexandra. Nevertheless, Irving managed to keep most of his customers and Moore claimed bankruptcy and his boats were taken from service.

Captain William Irving moved his family to New Westminster, into their new house at 302 Royal Avenue, on August 5, 1865. This house is preserved as Irving House and is the oldest intact house in the Lower mainland of British Columbia.

By 1865, there were only four sternwheelers on the lower Fraser River, Irving's Reliance and Onward and Captain Fleming's Lillooet and Hope. The two captains agreed to run their sternwheelers on alternate years and take an equal share of the profits.

1871 was the year that British Columbia went from being the Colony of British Columbia and became a province in Canada, an arrangement that included the promise of a railway constructed to the coast. The construction of the Canadian Pacific Railway would breathe new life into the area and make the faltering river trade profitable again. Tragically, William Irving would not live long enough to enjoy the prosperity of this new era. He died on August 28, 1872, at New Westminster. On the day of his funeral all of the flags in town were flown at half-mast and all of the stores were closed. He is buried at the Fraser Cemetery in New Westminster.

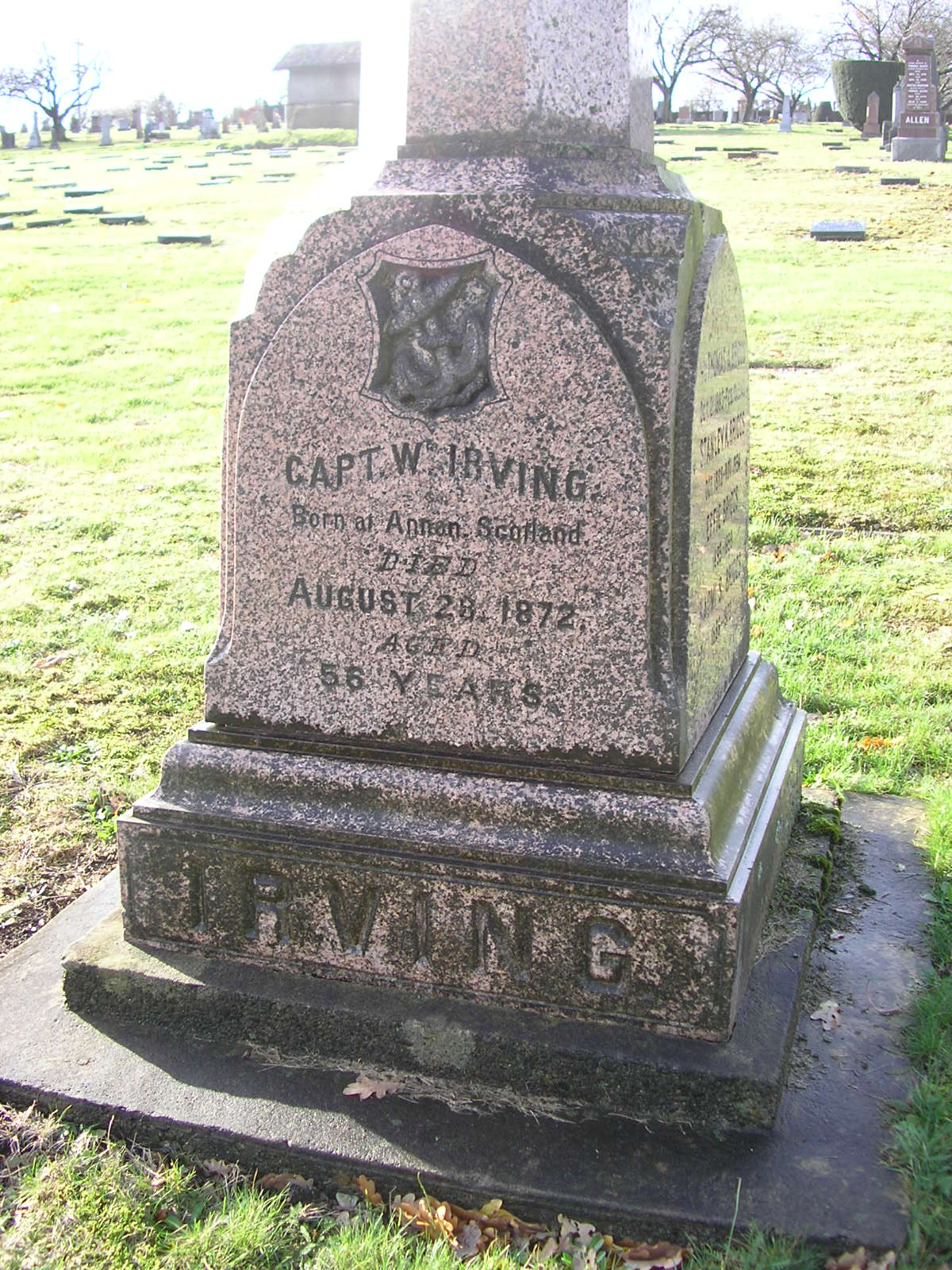
Captain William Irving

Although he was only eighteen, William's son, John Irving, would take over his father's business and become every bit as successful in the river trade in British Columbia in the following decades.
