= John Irving (steamship captain) =

Canadian steamship captain

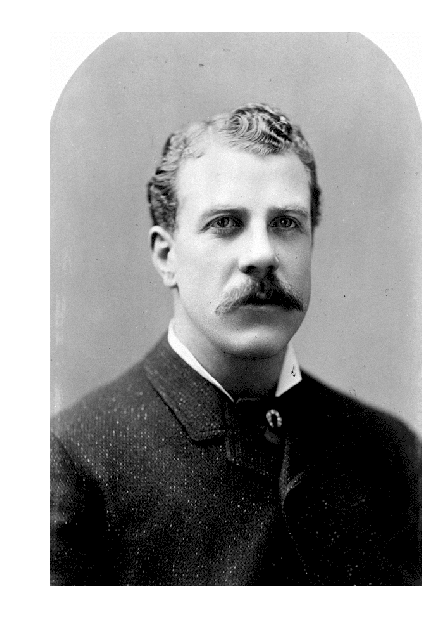
- John Irving (1880)
- Born: November 24, 1854; Irvington, Portland, Oregon
- Died: August or October 10, 1936 (aged 81); Vancouver, British Columbia
- Occupation: steamship captain
- Children: Willie Irving
- Parent(s): William Irving; Elizabeth Dixon Irving

John Irving (November 24, 1854 – August or October 10, 1936) was a steamship captain in British Columbia, Canada. He began on the Fraser River at the age of 18 and would become one of the most famous and prosperous riverboat captains of the era. His father, William Irving, was known as the "King of the River" and the neighborhood of Irvington in Portland, Oregon, is named in honor of their family.

== Early years ==
John was born in 1854 in the neighborhood of Irvington in Portland, Oregon, the second child and only son of William and Elizabeth Irving.

The family moved to New Westminster, British Columbia, in 1859 and John's father began work on the Fraser River. William Irving became a partner in the Victoria Steam Navigation Company and built two sternwheelers, the Governor Douglas and the Colonel Moody to serve between New Westminster and Victoria. However, he did not have a monopoly on the route and rate wars soon erupted between him and his main rival, Captain William Moore who was running his Henrietta on the same route.

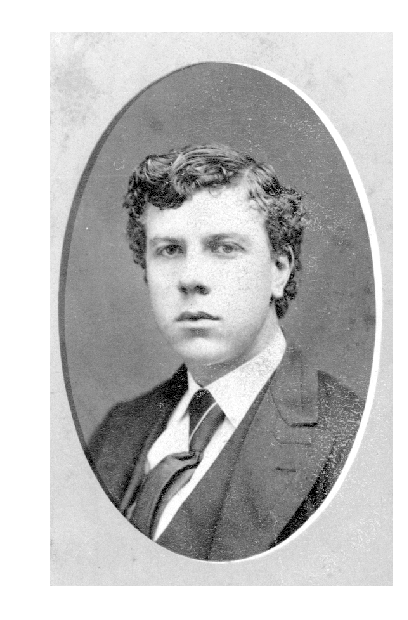
John Irving at 19

In 1862, news of the gold strikes in the Cariboo Gold Rush brought 4,000 miners to the area and William Irving sold his boats to John Wright and had another sternwheeler built, the Reliance and later the Onward which were kept busy shipping miners and supplies to Yale where they could travel on the nearly completed Cariboo Wagon Road to the goldfields at Barkerville.

John Irving was only eighteen when his father died on August 28, 1872, at New Westminster. He inherited the Onward and the Reliance and soon proved that he was capable of following in his father's footsteps.

== Fraser and Stikine Rivers ==
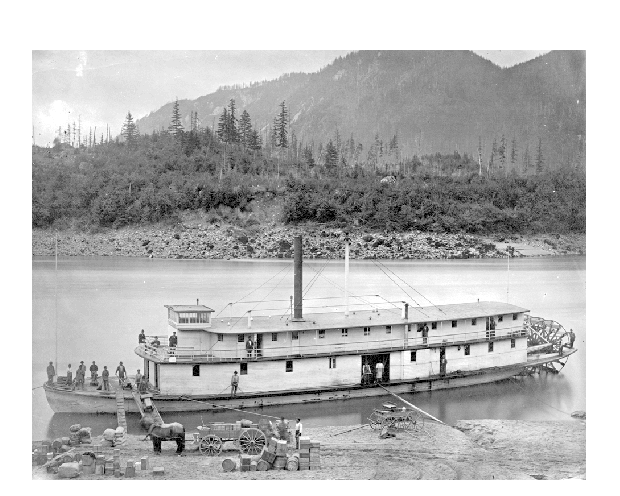
John Irving's Reliance at Yale (1880)

In 1873, John Irving took command of the Onward and ordered a new sternwheeler, the Glenora which was launched in 1874 and taken up to the Stikine River to provide freight and passenger service for the miners during the Cassiar Gold Rush. Though the Stikine was William Moore's territory, he was busy prospecting so the Glenora's only competition was Captain Parson's Hope. The two sternwheelers both worked on the Stikine until that June when the owner's agreed to share in the profits of Parson's Hope and Irving brought the Glenora back to the Fraser River.

In 1874, John Irving purchased the Royal City from Captain Parson, who would perish the following year with his wife and daughter during the sinking of the SS Pacific.

In 1875, John had his first rate war with his father's old rival, William Moore. Moore ran the Gertrude against Irving's Royal City for a few weeks, creating a rate war that lowered fares to $1 between New Westminster and Yale. Seeing there was no profits to be made, Moore laid the Gertrude up at Victoria and John Irving was left to his river again.

In 1876, John had another sternwheeler built, the Reliance, which he first intended to run on the Stikine, but after consultation with Moore, the two captains decided it was more profitable for them to stick to their respective rivers.

In 1879, the Glenora sank and was badly damaged just below the Harrison River and John replaced her with a new vessel, the William Irving.

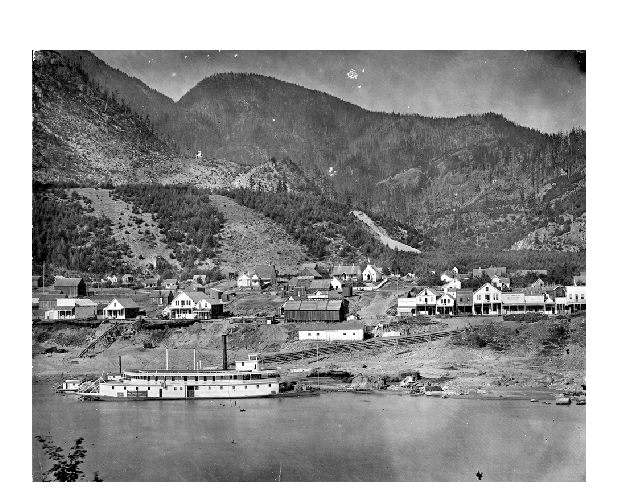
John Irving's William Irving at Yale (1882)

By 1881, only five sternwheelers were on the river, Irving's Reliance, Royal City and William Irving along with Moore's Cassiar and Western Slope and the two captains battled for the increased business caused by the construction of the Canadian Pacific Railway. The old rivalry ran hot as Moore's and Irving's sternwheelers raced up and down the Fraser, competing for passengers. To compete with Moore's Western Slope, Irving built a new sternwheeler, the $80,000 Elizabeth J Irving which on its second trip to Yale, raced Moore's Western Slope and, midway through the race, caught on fire near Hope and was soon reduced to a charred wreck, resulting in the deaths of four First Nations crewmen, two horses and two cows. The loss would be a tremendous financial blow to John Irving who had just allowed the vessel's insurance to expire a week earlier.

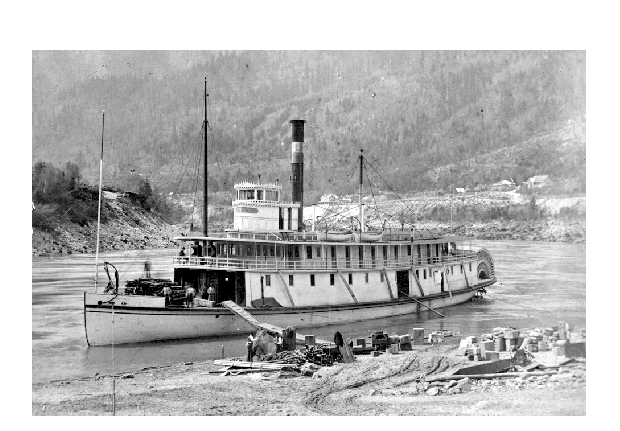
Irving's RP Rithet at Yale (1882)

In 1882, Irving ordered another sternwheeler, the RP Rithet, the finest yet on the river. Simply gorgeous... the RP Rithet is truly a floating palace raved the New Westminster newspaper. Meanwhile, William Moore had fallen on hard times, losing not only his sternwheelers, but also his home and properties in Victoria. John Irving purchased the Moore's Western Slope at auction, and in a grand gesture that proved he was a man of great honor, hired William Moore's three sons to be her crew, Billie to be her captain, Henry her mate and John her purser, thus helping his rival's family remain solvent.

In 1883 John, then 29, was made the general manager of the Canadian Pacific Navigation Company and the future looked bright, but the completion of the railway replaced Yale with Ashcroft as the gateway to the Cariboo and points further north and sternwheelers were demoted to working for local trade. After becoming general manager, John Irving arranged for the company to purchase the sidewheel steamboat Yosemite which had been lying idle in Oakland, California from 1879 to 1883.

== Upper Fraser River ==
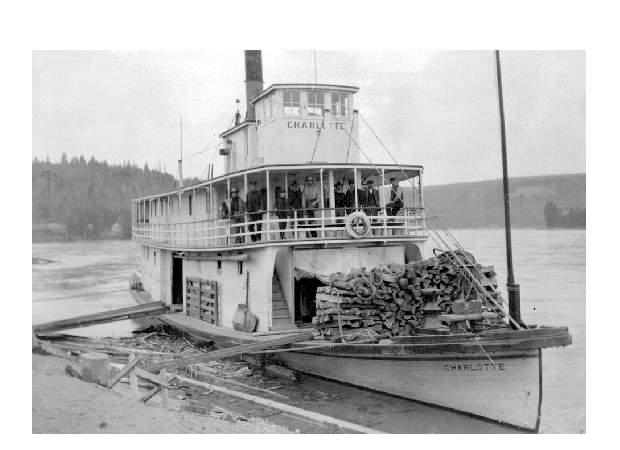
Charlotte at Quesnel (1898)

In 1896, John Irving partnered with Stephen Tingley, the former owner of the BC Express Company and Senator James Reid of Quesnel and formed the North British Columbia Navigation Company. The partners hired Alexander Watson to build a sternwheeler to work on the Fraser River, the Charlotte. She would be piloted by Frank Odin and later, Owen Forrester Browne. The Charlotte ran from Soda Creek to Quesnel and was the only sternwheeler on the upper Fraser until 1909.

== Purchase by Canadian Pacific Railway ==
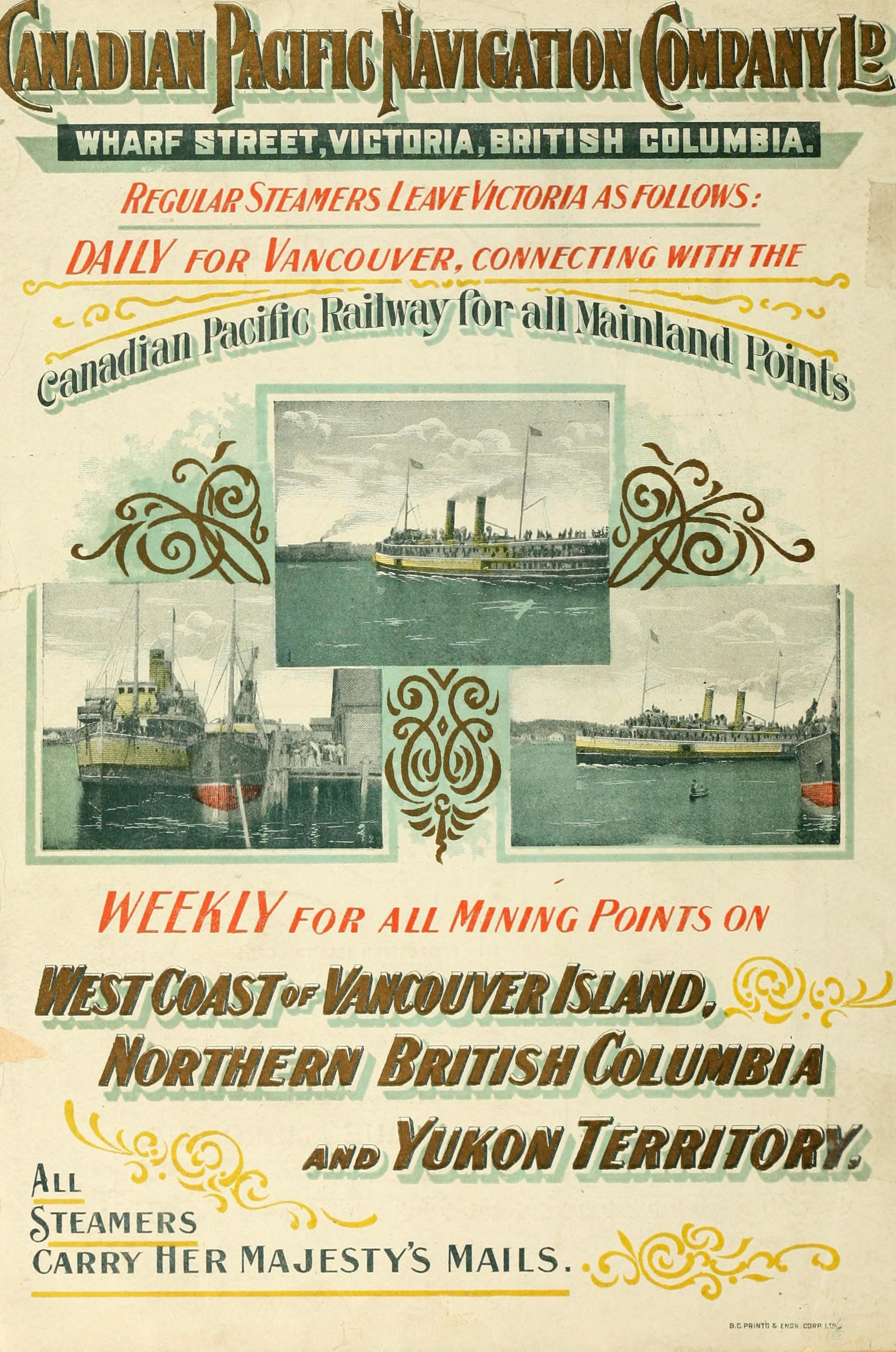
Advertisement from December 1899 in British Columbia Mining Record for Irving's Canadian Pacific Navigation Company

In 1901, the CPR purchased the CPNC and told John Irving that he could ride free on their boats for the rest of his life. In his retirement years, he would take them up on the offer and travel on the CPR ships frequently.

== Political career ==
From 1894 to 1901 John Irving was the member of the Legislative Assembly for the Cassiar Electoral District.

== Later years ==
Historian Norman R. Hacking came to know John Irving well in the captain's later years, and wrote of him:

The latter days of Captain Irving were sad. He gambled or gave his money away with gay abandon. In a few years his fine mansion in Victoria, his horses and stables, the accumulated wealth of a most successful business career; all were gone. The death of his only son Willie in the first Great War was a great blow, and the old man gallantly offered to enlist and take his son's place.

When Irving had sold the Canadian Pacific Navigation Company to the CPR, he had been presented with a lifetime pass to travel on the CPR's coastal steamships as a guest of the company. Irving, who apparently lacked a regular home ashore, came to use the pass constantly. So long as Irving's old friend James W. Troup was superintendent of CPR coastal operations, Irving was always welcome aboard the company's ships. When Captain Troup retired, his successor, believing that Irving was abusing the pass, warned his captains that while travel might be at the company's expense, Irving was to be required to pay for accommodations and meals on board. This directive was ignored by the CPR's captains, who continued to seat Irving at the captain's table and make sure a cabin was available for him.

Hacking described Irving's last years:

In his later years Captain Irving lived in a small converted store on West Pender Street in Vancouver. With his tall spruce figure and his white goatee beard he was a very handsome gentleman. His favorite remark when meeting an old friend on the street was "How about a smile?" He died in 1936, poor in everything but friends.

== See also ==
- Cassiar (electoral district)
