= SS Islander =

Ship built in Scotland in 1888

Coordinates: 58.3765°N 134.7885°W

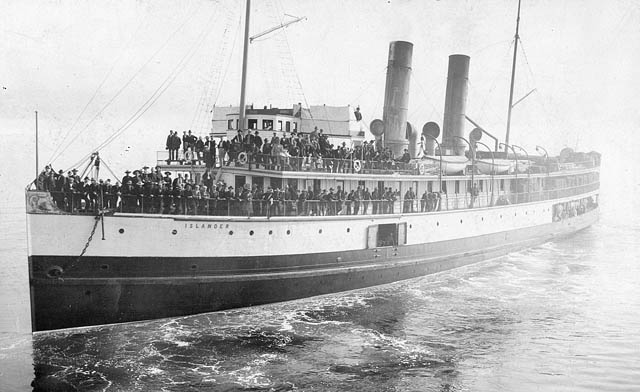
- SS Islander in 1897, leaving Vancouver, BC for Skagway Bay.

History

United Kingdom
- Name: Islander
- Operator: Canadian-Pacific Navigation Company
- Builder: Napier, Shanks and Bell of Glasgow
- Yard number: 41
- Launched: 11 July 1888
- Fate: Sunk on 15 August 1901

General characteristics
- Class & type: Steam merchant ship
- Tonnage: 1519
- Length: 240 ft (73 m)
- Beam: 42 ft (13 m)
- Draught: 14 ft (4.3 m)
- Propulsion: Dunsmuir & Jackson triple expansion steam engine; twin screw
- Speed: 15 knots (28 km/h)

The SS Islander was a 1519-ton, 240-foot (73 m) steel hull, schooner-rigged twin-screw steamer, built in Scotland in 1888, and owned and operated by the Canadian-Pacific Navigation Company.

She was built especially for the Inside Passage to Alaska and was reputedly the most luxurious steamer engaged on that run. As a consequence, she was favoured by many wealthy businessmen, speculators, bankers, railroad tycoons and the like who had a stake in the lucrative Klondike gold fields.

== Wreck of Islander ==
Headline announcing sinking of Islander, reporting 65 lives lost

On 14 August 1901, Islander departed Skagway, Alaska for Victoria, British Columbia, filled to capacity with passengers and carrying a cargo of gold bullion valued at over $6,000,000 in 1901 dollars. Sometime after 2:00 am on 15 August 1901 while sailing down the narrow Lynn Canal south of Juneau, she struck what was reported to be an iceberg that stove a large hole in her forward port quarter. Attempts to steer the foundering vessel ashore on nearby Douglas Island were in vain; within five minutes, the tremendous weight of the water filling the ship's forward compartments had forced her bow underwater and her stern, rudder and propellers completely out of the water.

After drifting for about 15 minutes in a strong southerly outbound tide, Islander began her final plunge to the bottom and sank quickly. She was reported to have carried 107 passengers and a crew of 61 during the last voyage. In total, 40 people died, including the wife and daughter of politician James Hamilton Ross.

== Salvage attempts ==
Reports concerning the substantial value of the ship's cargo led to many early salvage attempts and also several lawsuits. No sooner had Islander sunk than efforts began to locate the wreck. Within days, another ship, the SS Haling, was sounding the area in order to determine the wreck's depth.

The first attempt to locate Islander was a failure. In 1902 Henry Finch, an experienced diver with 40 years' experience, dragged the bottom of the Lynn Canal for the wreck. He located the hull but was not able to proceed with an actual salvage attempt.

=== 1904 ===
In 1904, equipped with a specially designed barge and diving bell, Finch succeeded in locating the wreck of Islander in 175 feet (53 m) of water and reported a "gaping hole" in the ship's bow. Unfortunately, Finch did not have the means to gain access to the reported location of the gold in the Purser's Office amidships and as a result only a section of deck rail and grating were recovered.

Over the next 25 years at least a dozen separate salvage attempts were made on Islander. Every operation succeeded in reaching the wreck, but none proved able to penetrate the ship's hold or recover any of the gold. Apart from the adverse weather conditions, the strong currents, and extremely cold temperatures, salvage from the depth at which the wreck lay was virtually unknown in the early 20th century.

=== 1929 ===
In 1929 Captain Wiley of Seattle teamed up with Frank Curtis, a professional housemover with experience in moving and transporting large structures. Their scheme involved leading 20 steel cables beneath the sunken liner that were to be connected to surface vessels. The cables were then to be tightened at each low tide, inching the wreck towards shore with each high tide. This challenging operation occupied two complete salvage seasons until, on 20 July 1934, Islander surfaced near Green's Cove, Admiralty Island, Alaska.

The "gaping hole" first noted by Henry Finch in 1904 turned out to be more significant than suspected: 60 feet (18 m) of the Islander's bow, including the Mail and Storage Room, had been completely sheared off. However, it was the Purser's Office in the midsection of the vessel where Islander's gold was expected to be found.

Disappointingly, when the wreck was cleared, Islander yielded only $75,000 worth of gold nuggets and gold dust. The Purser's Office disclosed none of the strongboxes of bullion that were expected; its safe contained just a handful of US$10 and $20 gold coins and some waterlogged paper currency.

According to statements made by the North West Mounted Police (NWMP) constables who were aboard the ship to guard the shipment of gold, the bullion had been stowed in a locker on the port side of the forward well deck, just abaft the break of the focsle – an area located within the "missing" bow section which was not located until August 1996.

=== 1996 ===
In 1996, OceanMar Inc. of Seattle raised capital in the US and the UK to charter a suitable vessel and mount a salvage expedition equipped with an extensive sidescan sonar suite, and a "Surveyor" Remotely Operated Vehicle.

On their arrival at Juneau, the expedition's ship, the MV Jolly Roger, was boarded by a US Deputy Marshal, and the expedition was served with a Temporary Restraining Order, obtained by a rival salvage company, Yukon Recovery of Seattle. Yukon Recovery claimed rights to the wreck on the grounds that they had salvaged a light fitting and a bottle, under the Abandoned Shipwrecks Act. OceanMar, who had extensively researched Islander asserted that the wreck had never been abandoned and their Salvage Agreement which was with the original insurers consequently took precedence. OceanMar were also able to show that they had located the bow section long before Yukon appeared on the scene.

A meeting in Anchorage with a judge who was an expert in maritime law resulted in OceanMar being granted permission to survey and video the wreck site, on the strict understanding that nothing was to be removed from the wreck.

Jolly Roger and her crew spent the following five weeks recording every aspect of the bow section and side-scanning the debris field lying between the original point of impact and the ship's final resting place. Islander's bow section was located on the 95th anniversary of the sinking, almost to the hour.

OceanMar then found themselves involved in four years of legal action with Yukon Recovery, resulting in the United States courts of appeals finding in favour of OceanMar on 7 March 2000.

In 2004, the company was still trying to raise the capital needed to mount a new salvage effort.
