= SS Klondike =

Steamboats of the Yukon River

SS Klondike II
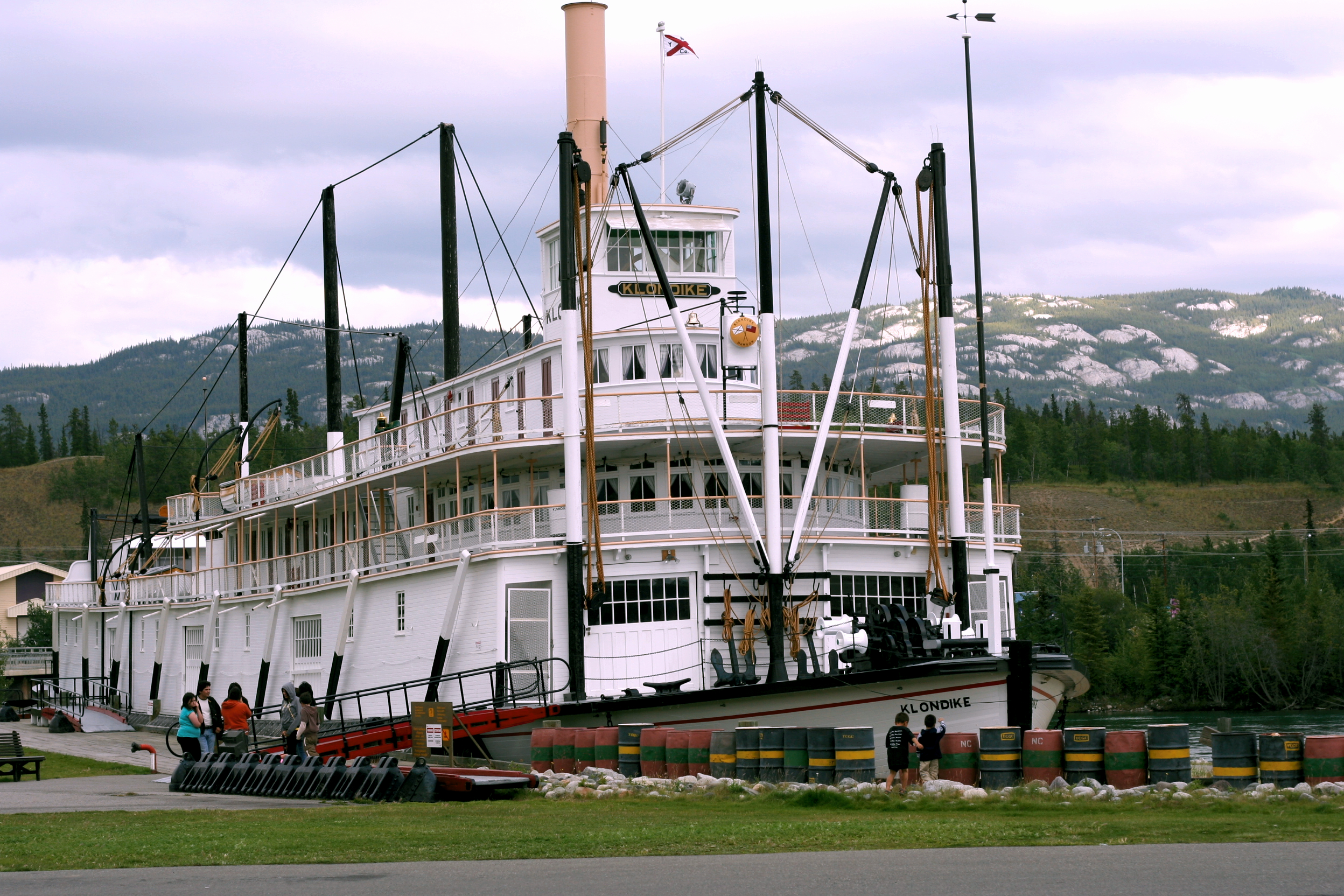
- Klondike II

History

Canada
- Owner: British Yukon Navigation Co.
- Launched: 1929 (Klondike I); May 1937 (Klondike II)
- In service: 1929–1936 (Klondike I); 1937–1955 (Klondike II)
- Fate: Ran aground 1936 (Klondike I)
- Status: Museum ship (Klondike II)

General characteristics (Klondike II)
- Type: Sternwheeler
- Tonnage: 1,226.25 GT; 918.45 GRT
- Length: 64 m (210 ft)
- Beam: 12.5 m (41 ft)
- Draught: 0.6 m (24 in) light; 1 m (39 in) loaded
- Depth: 1.5 m (4 ft 11 in) (molded depth)
- Installed power: 2 × compound jet-condenser steam engines 525 hp (391 kW)
- Propulsion: Stern paddlewheel
- Capacity: Passengers: 75; Cargo: 270 tonnes (270 long tons; 300 short tons)
- Crew: 23

National Historic Site of Canada
- Official name: SS Klondike National Historic Site of Canada
- Designated: 24 June 1967

SS Klondike is the name of two sternwheelers, known separately as Klondike I and Klondike II, of which the second is a National Historic Site located in Whitehorse, Yukon, Canada. They ran freight between Whitehorse and Dawson City, along the Yukon River, the first from 1929 to 1936 and the second, an almost exact replica of the first, from 1937 to 1950.

== History ==
Klondike I was built by the British Yukon Navigation Company (a subsidiary of the White Pass and Yukon Route railway company) in 1929 and had the distinction of having 50% more capacity than a regular sternwheeler, while still having the shallow draft and meeting the size requirements in order to travel down the Yukon River. Klondike I had a cargo capacity of 270 metric tonnes without having to push a barge.

In June 1936, Klondike I ran aground north of The Thirty Mile section of the Yukon River (at 61°40′17″N 134°52′22″W). The company salvaged the ship's boiler, engines, and many fittings to build Klondike II the following year. The remains of the hull of the Klondike I can still be seen at low water by canoeists on the Yukon River.

Klondike II carried freight until the early 1950s. Due to the construction of a highway connecting Dawson City and Whitehorse, many Yukon River sternwheelers were decommissioned. In an attempt to save Klondike II, she was converted into a cruise ship by White Pass and Yukon Route. The Duke of Edinburgh (consort of Elizabeth II, Queen of Canada) was invited to tour the ship in 1954, being taken on a short trip down the Yukon River and back to Whitehorse during his day-long visit to the city. The venture shut down in 1955 due to lack of interest and Klondike II was left on the ways in the Whitehorse shipyards.

The ship was donated to Parks Canada and was gradually restored until 1966, when city authorities agreed to move the ship to its present location, at that time part of a squatters' area. The task required three bulldozers, eight tons of Palmolive soap, a crew of twelve men, and three weeks to complete. Greased log rollers eased the process. On 24 June 1967, the SS Klondike was designated a National Historic Site of Canada, and she is now open during the summer as a tourist attraction.

== See also ==
- SS Keno
- SS Nenana
- Steamboats of the Yukon River

== Sources ==
- Green, Dianne (1996). Exploring Old Whitehorse. Whitehorse, Yukon: Northbush Publishing Ltd. ISBN 978-0-921114-01-7.
- Dobrowelsky, Helene; Ingram, Rob (1994). Edge of the River, Heart of the City. Whitehorse, Yukon: Lost Moose Publishing. ISBN 978-0-9694612-2-7.
