= Steamboats of the Yukon River =

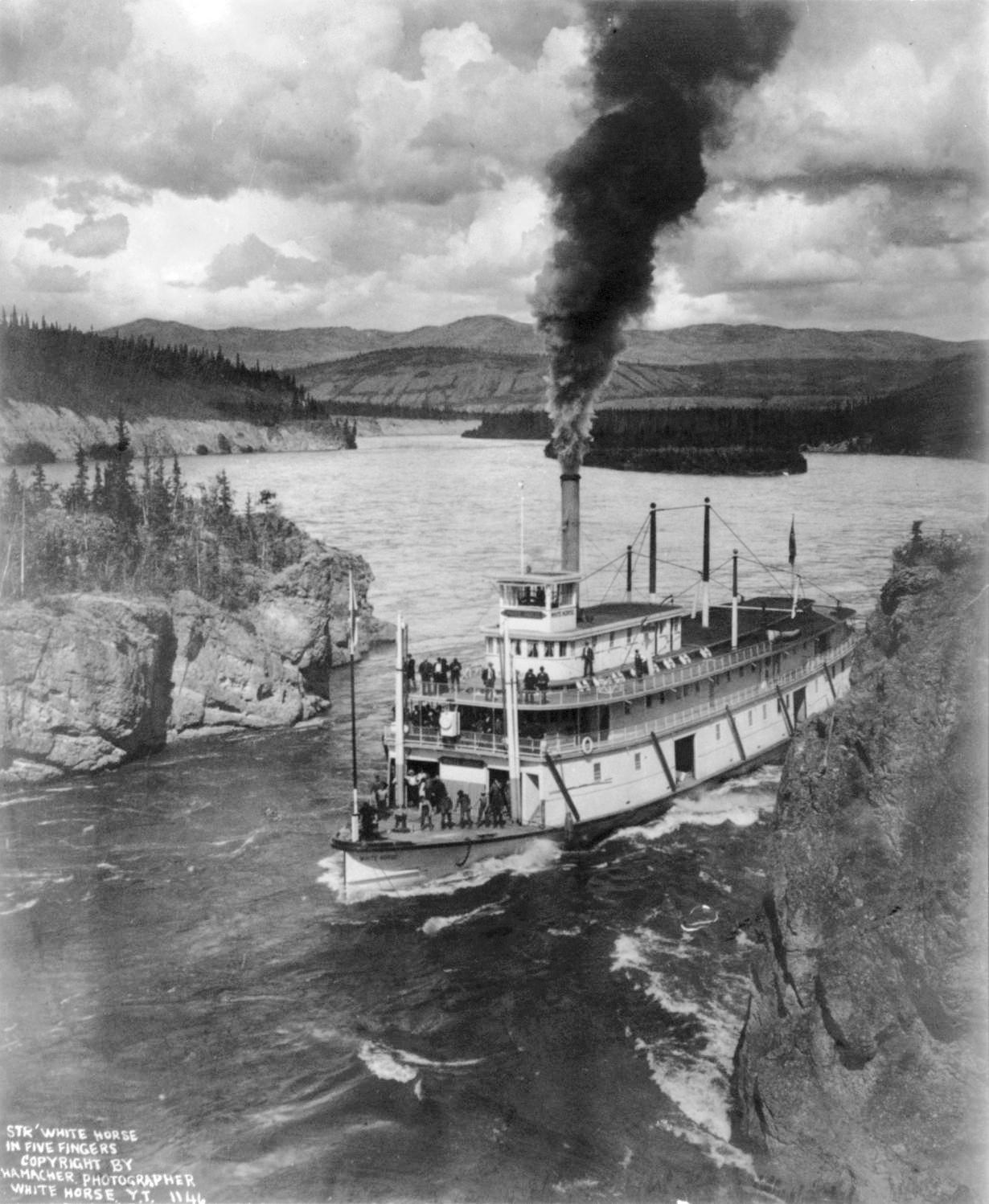
Steamer White Horse in Five Finger Rapids, Yukon

Steamboats on the Yukon River played a role in the development of Alaska and Yukon. Access to the interior of Alaska and Yukon was hindered by large mountains and distance, but the wide Yukon River provided a feasible route. The first steamers on the lower Yukon River were work boats for the Collins Overland Telegraph in 1866 or 1867, with a small steamer called Wilder. The mouth of the Yukon River is far to the west at St. Michael and a journey from Seattle or San Francisco covered some 4,000 miles (6,400 km).

== Early history ==
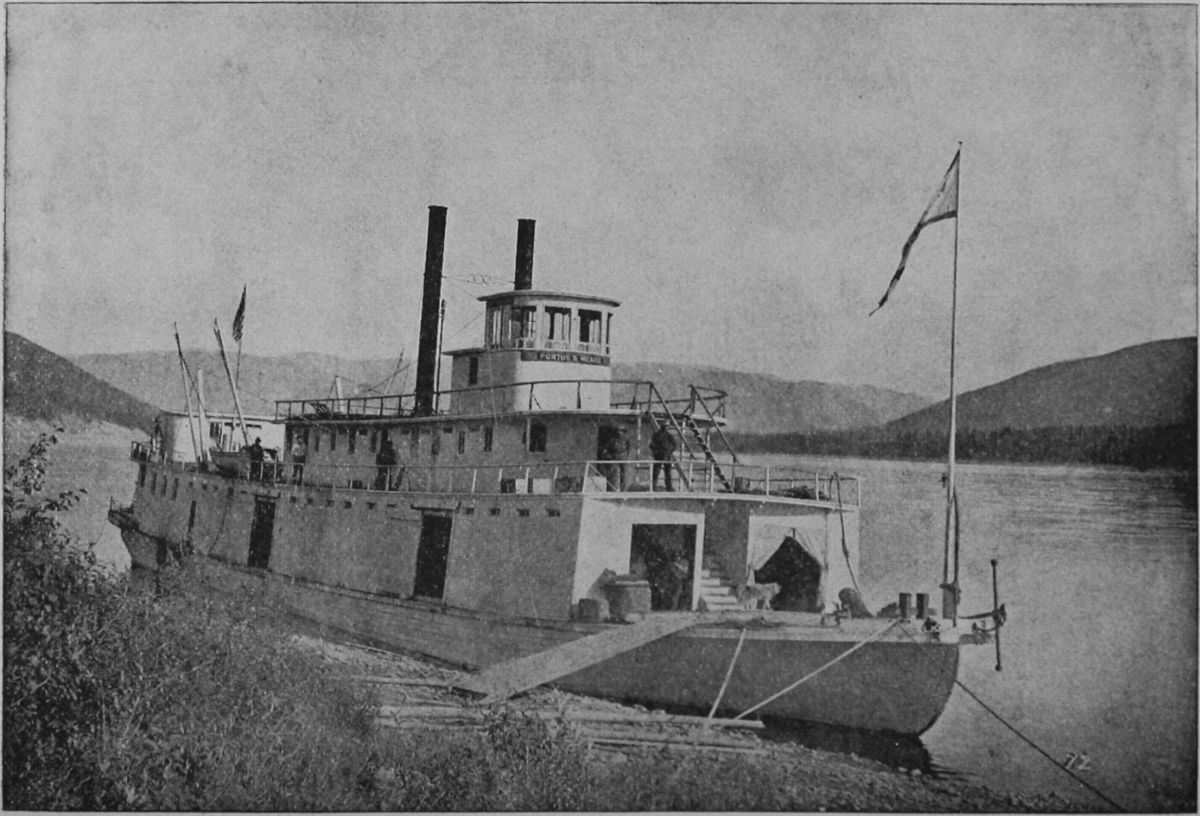
Steamer Portus B. Weare on the Yukon, ca. 1895

There were a series of steamers owned by the Alaska Commercial Company: Yukon (screw propeller) of 1869, and St. Michael (stern wheel) of 1879. Slowly the north was opened up with the help of river steamers. Portus B. Weare worked the river after 1892. In 1897 there were 7 steamers operating in the Yukon, by 1899 there were 30.

== Gold rush ==
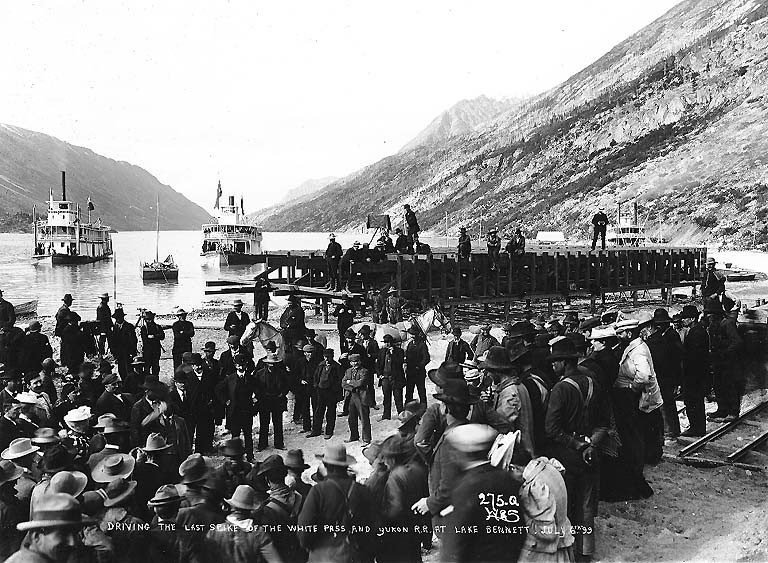
Completion of the White Pass & Yukon Railroad at Bennett Lake, Yukon river, July 6, 1899.

In 1900, the White Pass & Yukon Route completed its railroad line between Skagway, Alaska and Whitehorse, Yukon. In 1901, the company entered the steamboat business to complete the service to points on the Yukon River. Beginning in 1901, the White Pass was almost the exclusive operator on the Upper Yukon River (Whitehorse–Dawson City). The service also included Tagish Lake and Atlin Lake, the headwaters of the Yukon River.

== Reorganization ==
In 1914, White Pass took over the Northern Navigation Co., which was the biggest operator on the lower Yukon River (Dawson City–Tanana–St. Michael), and the biggest operator on the Tanana/Chena Rivers (Tanana–Nenana–Fairbanks). The Northern Navigation Co. had been formed by earlier mergers including the River Divisions of the Alaska Commercial Co., the Alaska Exploration Co., the Seattle–Yukon Transportation Co., the Empire Transportation Co., and the North American Transportation & Trading Co.

At its zenith, 1914–1921, White Pass served over 2,000 miles (3,200 km) of rivers and lakes by boat and had a near-monopoly on public transportation in the region. Throughout its reign over the Yukon River and tributaries, the White Pass obtained 88 steamboats, some new, most from companies it took over. It inherited most of the boats of the former major operators on the Yukon River.

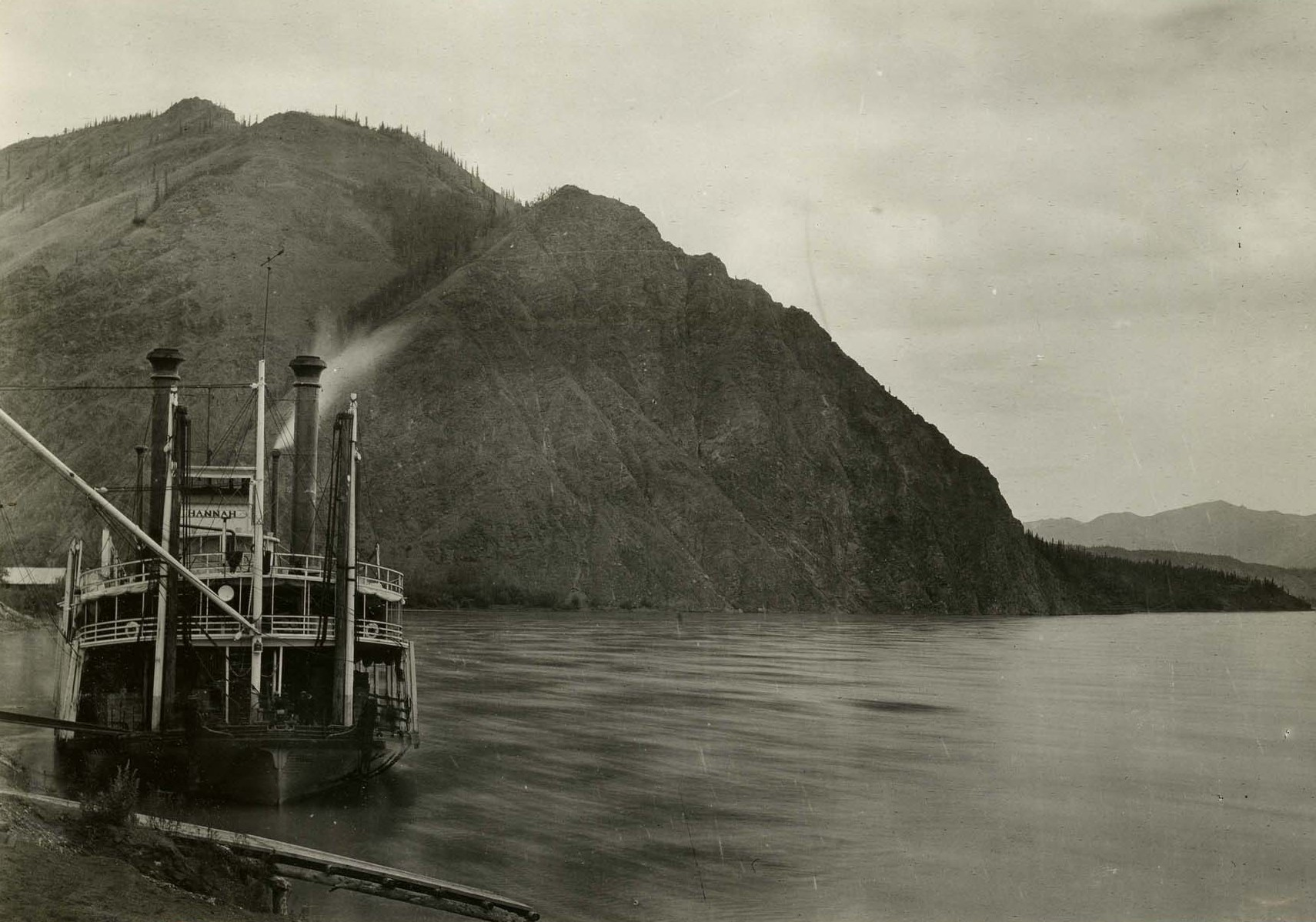
Steamer Hannah on Yukon River, at Eagle, Alaska, circa 1900.

White Pass boats which operated on the upper Yukon River generally were registered in Canada and were operated by a subsidiary known as the British Yukon Navigation Co. White Pass boats which operated on the Lower Yukon River generally were registered in the US and were operated by a subsidiary known as the American Yukon Navigation Co.

Beginning in 1922, most of the White Pass business on the Lower Yukon River and on the Tanana/Chena Rivers was eliminated by competition from the Alaskan Engineering Commission or “U.S. Government Railroad” (which was reorganized as The Alaska Railroad in 1923). After the U.S. Government Railroad reached Nenana in 1922, the White Pass cut back service on the Lower Yukon to between Dawson City and Tanana only, and on the Tanana River to between Tanana and Nenana only. The Alaska Railroad operated commercial boats on the Tanana River and on the Lower Yukon River from the 1923 reorganization until the end of 1953. On the Tanana River, the A.R.R. operated between Nenana and Tanana. On the Lower Yukon River, the A.R.R. operated between Tanana and Marshall, Alaska. The Alaska Railroad discontinued river passenger service at the end of the 1949 season. Connecting passenger service between Marshall and St. Michael was provided by the Northern Commercial Co., from 1923 to 1949, using the 45-foot 16-gross ton gasoline-powered screw propeller vessel Agulleit (U.S.A. #214487).

The Alaska Railroad ended its river freight operation and leased all of its river equipment to the Yutana Barge Line beginning in 1954. The A.R.R. sold its remaining river equipment to the Yutana Barge Line in 1980. The White Pass discontinued regular service on the Lower Yukon River and Tanana River at the end of the 1941 season. The White Pass was put out of the river business altogether by competition from the North Klondike Highway (Whitehorse–Dawson City) and the Atlin Road, which were completed in the early 1950s. Only one former White Pass boat remains operational, the diesel-powered Yukon Rose. One more is being considered for restoration, the gasoline-powered Loon.

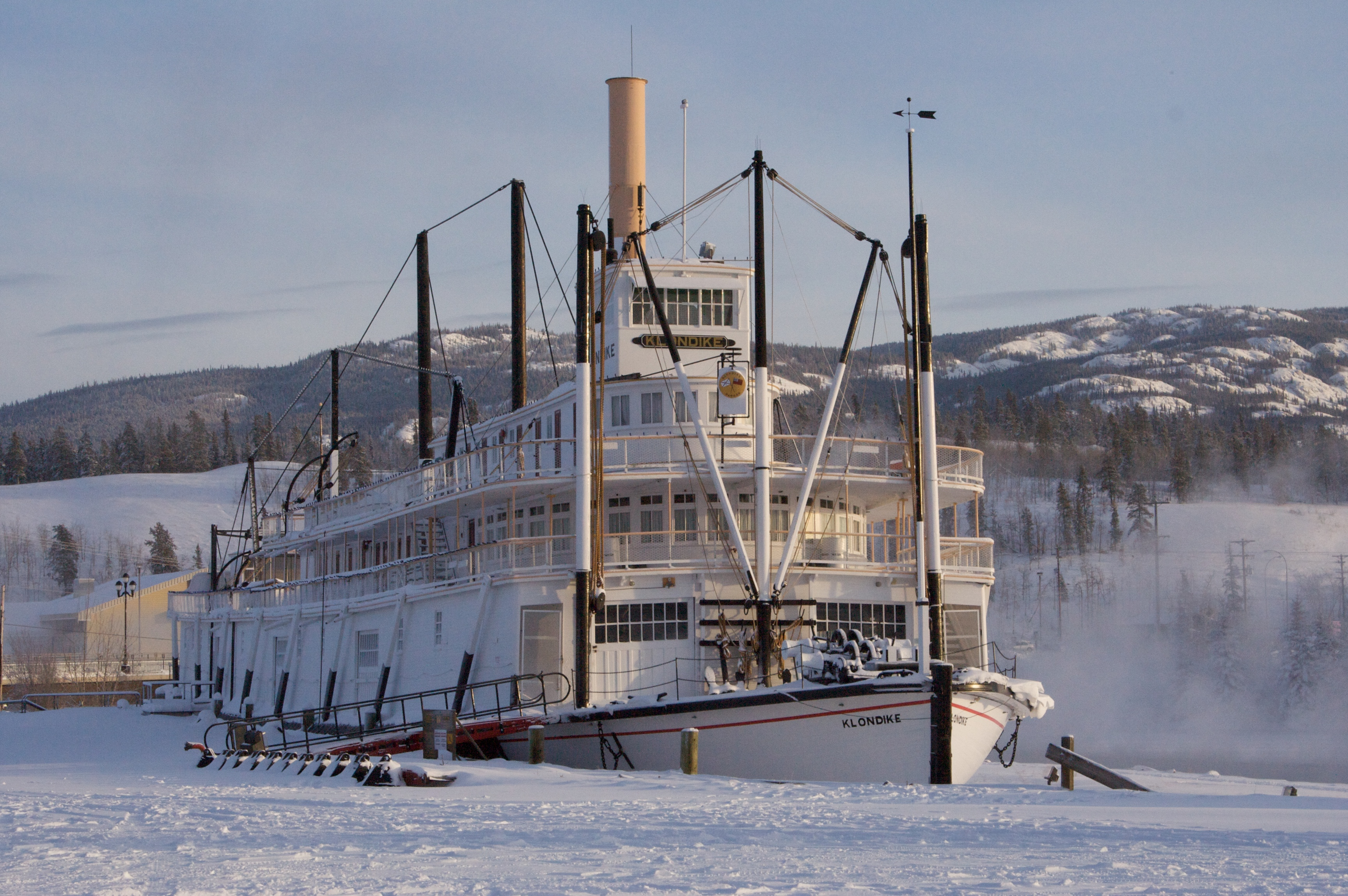
SS Klondike, 2008

The last steamboat in regular service on the Lower Yukon River was the Nenana, in 1954. The last steamboat in regular service on the Upper Yukon River was Klondike (Klondike II), which made her last run on July 4, 1955. The last commercial steamboat to operate under its own power on the Yukon River was the Keno, from Whitehorse to Dawson City on August 26–29, 1960. It was an equipment run to move the boat for purposes of putting it on display at Dawson City. Keno, the second Klondike, and Nenana survive as museums.

== List of vessels ==
List of steamboats on the Yukon River

== See also ==
- SS Klondike
- Moyie (sternwheeler)
