= Berg Shipbuilding Company =

Former shipyard in Seattle, Washington

- Incorporated: 3 January 1930
- Founders: Andrew B. Berg
- Defunct: 1 July 1938
- Headquarters: Seattle, Washington

Berg Shipbuilding Company was a prominent shipyard in Seattle, Washington during the early 1930s. It built several important vessels for arms of the United States government before going out of business in 1935.

== Organizational history ==
Berg Shipbuilding Company was incorporated on 3 January 1930 and opened its shipyard a few weeks later. It was located at the foot of 26th Avenue NW in the Ballard neighborhood of Seattle, Washington. It was founded by Andrew B. Berg, H. A. Schurman, and Oscar Pripp. It was originally capitalized at $30,000. Berg was president and Schurman was secretary of the corporation.

In 1933 the company's capitalization was increased to $80,000.

The construction of USLHT Hemlock proved to be the company's undoing. Berg was inexperienced in the construction of steel vessels of Hemlock's size and lacked the capability to produce major parts of the ship. It relied on subcontractors to produce these, and then assembled them. Andrew Berg disagreed with his own employees and the government inspector overseeing the construction on how to build the ship. Berg and Schurman both left the company in late 1933. George Nelson, a general contractor, took over as president and became the owner of the company. Hemlock was finally delivered 238 days late, for which Berg Shipbuilding Company was assessed $38,000 in liquidated damages. Litigation around this contract went on for over a decade, but the company went out of existence. The corporation failed to pay its license fees for three years and was automatically dissolved on 1 July 1938.

Andrew Berg went on to found similarly named Berg Shipbuilding Corporation in Blaine, Washington. Berg's shipyard in Ballard was taken over by Seattle Shipbuilding and Drydock Company in 1936.

== Ship building history ==
Its first contracts were for two purse seiners, but Berg Shipbuilding Company built boats and ships of all sorts from wooden sailboats to steel trollers.

Notable vessels built by Berg Shipbuilding Company
Ship	Photo	Original Owner	Launched	Type
Martinville		Louis Sandstrom	28 June 1930	Purse seiner
Mamala		US Army Corps of Engineers	1 September 1931	Wooden survey vessel
USMS North Star		Bureau of Indian Affairs	18 January 1932	Wooden freighter
Discoverer		Heine Berger	28 February 1933	Freighter
Nenana		Alaska Railroad	15 May 1933	Riverboat
USLHT Hemlock		U.S. Lighthouse Service	20 January 1934	Steel lighthouse tender
Cheechako			1935	Wooden sailboat
