= USCGC Balsam =

American ship built in 1942

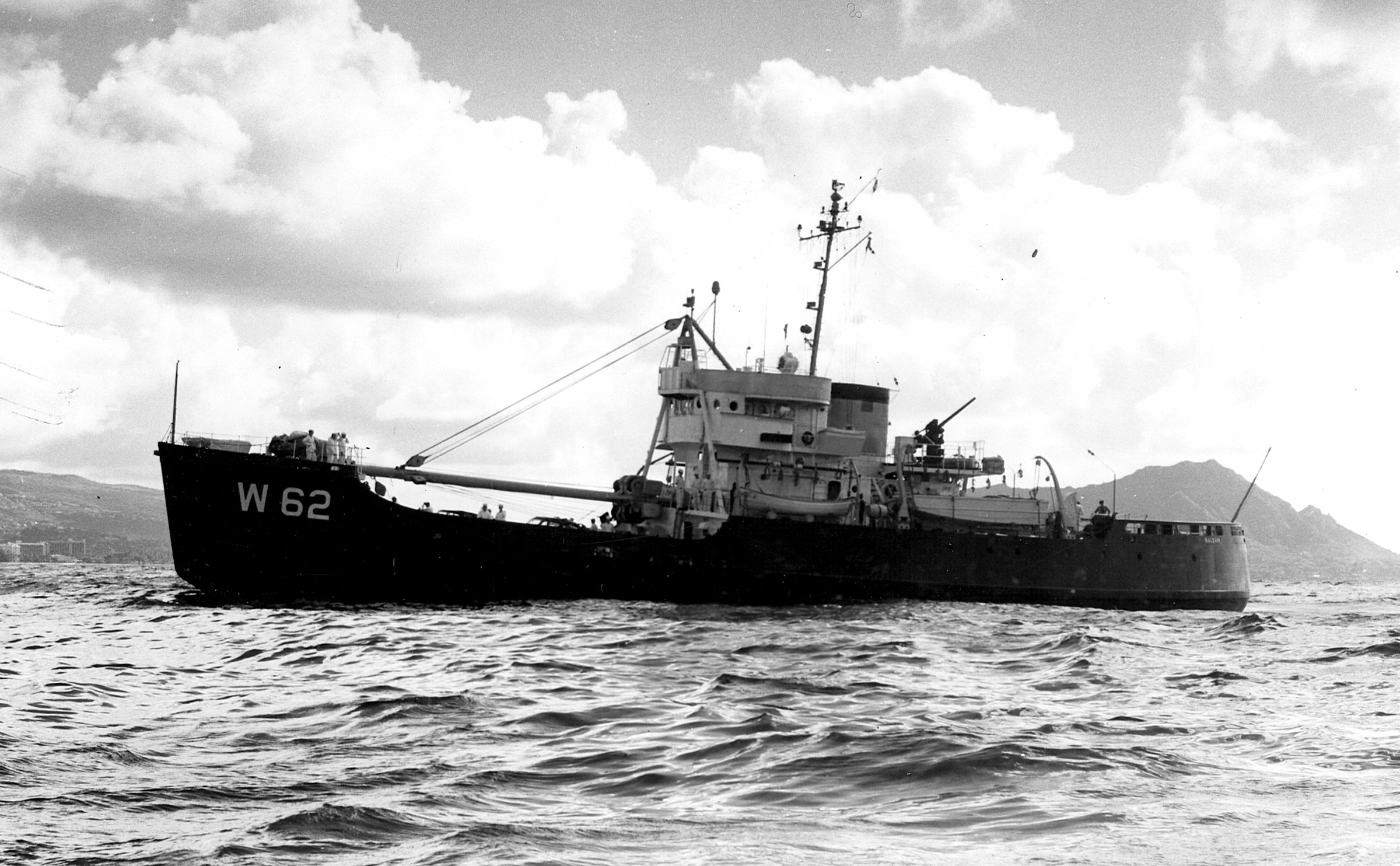
- Balsam off Honolulu in 1956

History

United States
- Builder: Zenith Dredge, Duluth, Minnesota
- Cost: $916,109
- Laid down: 25 October 1941
- Launched: 15 April 1942
- Commissioned: 14 October 1942
- Decommissioned: 6 March 1975
- Identification: Signal letters NRZB
- Fate: Sold into commercial service

United States
- Name: Baranof
- Identification: IMO number: 8836247; MMSI number: 367135370; Callsign: WDJ2505
- Status: Active fishing vessel

General characteristics as built in 1942
- Class & type: Cactus-class buoy tender
- Displacement: 935 tons
- Length: 180 ft (55 m)
- Beam: 37 ft (11 m)
- Draft: 12 feet (3.7 m)
- Propulsion: 2 × Cooper-Bessemer GND-8 Diesel engines
- Speed: 13 kn (24 km/h; 15 mph)
- Range: 8,000 nmi (15,000 km; 9,200 mi) at 13 kn (24 km/h; 15 mph)
- Complement: 6 officers and 74 enlisted men
- Armament: 20 mm guns, a 3 inch cannon, and depth charges.

USCGC Balsam (WLB-62) was a Cactus-class seagoing buoy tender (WLB) in the United States Coast Guard. She operated in the Pacific Ocean during World War II, then saw service along the United States West Coast, Hawaii, and Alaska. After her decommissioning in 1975, she was repurposed as a crab catcher-processor and is active in Alaskan fisheries as F/V Baranof.

== Construction and characteristics ==
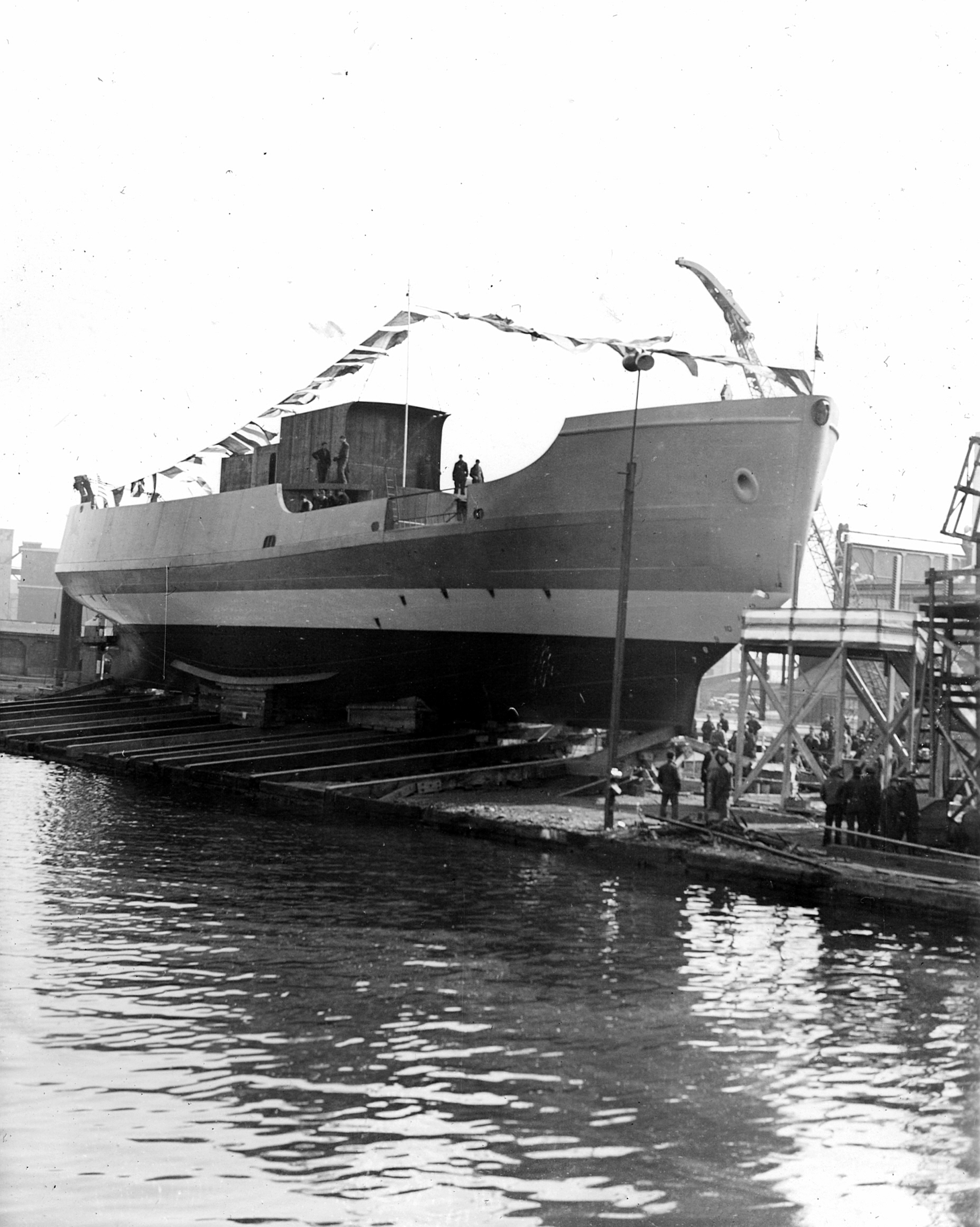
USCGC Balsam at her launch in April 1942

Balsam was built at the Zenith Dredge Company yard in Duluth, Minnesota. Her keel was laid down on 25 October 1941. The ship was launched on 15 April 1942. She was commissioned into the United States Coast Guard at Duluth on 14 October 1942. Her original cost was $916,109.

Her hull was constructed of welded steel plates framed with steel I-beams. As originally built, Balsam was 180 feet (55 m) long, with a beam of 37 feet (11 m), and a draft of 12 feet (3.7 m). Her displacement was 935 tons. While her overall dimensions remained the same over her career, the addition of new equipment raised her displacement to 1,025 tons by the end of her Coast Guard service.

She was designed to perform light ice-breaking. Her hull was reinforced with an "ice belt" of thicker steel around her waterline to protect it from punctures. Similarly, Balsam's bow was reinforced and shaped to ride over ice in order to crush it with the weight of the ship.

Balsam had a single 8.5-foot (2.6 m) stainless-steel five-blade propeller driven by a diesel-electric propulsion system. Two Cooper-Bessemer GND-8 4-cycle 8-cylinder diesel engines produced 700 horsepower (520 kW) each. They provided power to two Westinghouse generators. The electricity from the generators ran a 1,200 hp (890 kW) Westinghouse electric motor which turned the propeller.

She had a single cargo boom which had the ability to lift 20 tons onto her buoy deck.

The ship's fuel tanks had a capacity of approximately 30,000 US gallons (110,000 L; 25,000 imp gal). Balsam's unrefueled range was 8,000 nautical miles (15,000 km; 9,200 mi) at 13 knots (24 km/h; 15 mph), 12,000 nmi (22,000 km) at 12 knots (22 km/h; 14 mph), and 17,000 nmi (31,000 km; 20,000 mi) at 8.3 knots (15.4 km/h; 9.6 mph). Her potable water tanks had a capacity of 30,499 US gal (115,450 L; 25,396 imp gal). Considering dry storage capacity and other factors, her at-sea endurance was 21 days.

Her wartime complement was 6 officers and 74 enlisted men. By 1964 this was reduced to 5 officers, 2 warrant officers, and 42 enlisted personnel.

Balsam was armed with a 3"/50 caliber gun mounted behind the pilot house. She also had two 20 mm guns, one mounted on top of the wheelhouse and one on the aft deck. Two racks of depth charges were also mounted on the aft deck. She also was equipped with mousetrap anti-submarine rockets. All of this armament was removed in 1966 leaving Balsam with only small arms for law enforcement actions.

At the time of construction, Balsam was designated WAGL, an auxiliary vessel, lighthouse tender. In a 1966 reorganization of the hull designation system she was reclassified as WLB, an ocean-going buoy tender. Her namesake was the balsam fir.

== World War II service ==
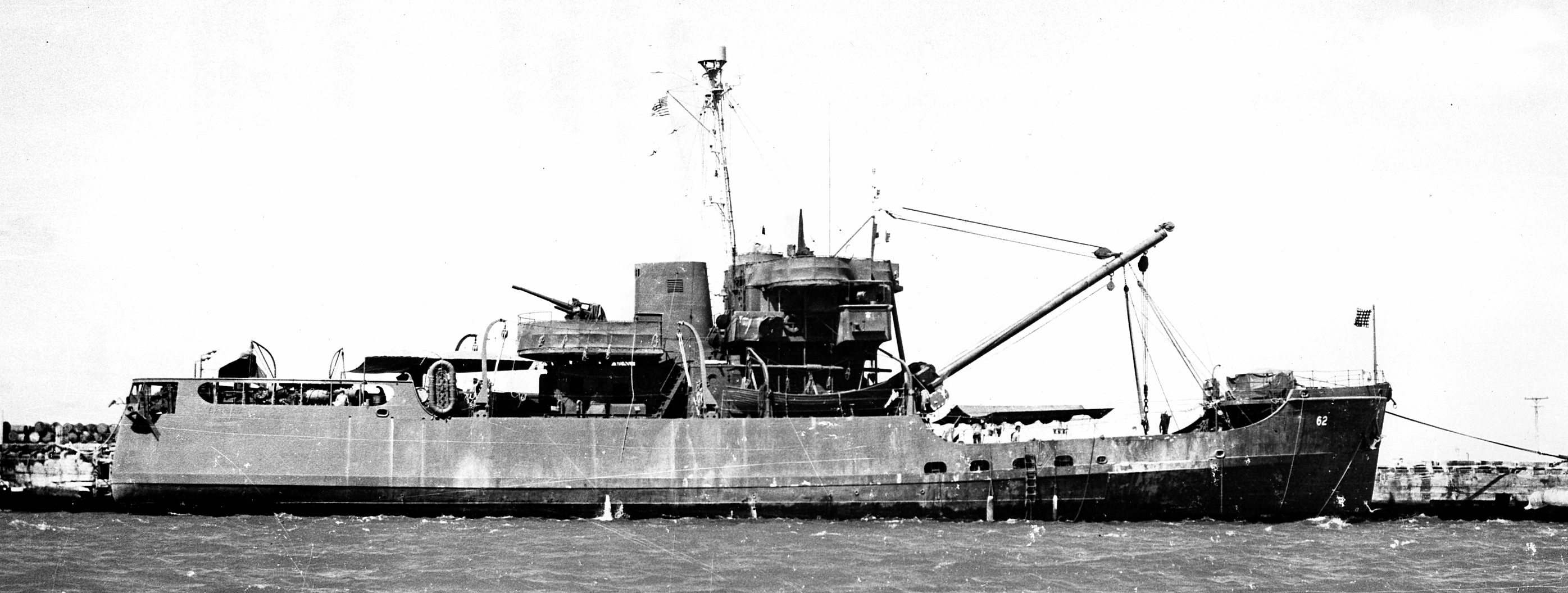
USCGC Balsam in the Pacific during World War II

After her commissioning, Balsam was assigned to San Francisco and sailed for the Pacific. On 24 April 1943 she was ordered to report for duty in the South Pacific to work on fleet moorings, navigation aids, and other harbor facilities. This she did across the Pacific, notably establishing fleet tanker moorings and related aids to navigation in three harbors in Okinawa in 1945. She also supported the construction and resupply of LORAN bases throughout the Pacific, including those at Canton Island, Majuro, Eniwetok, and Guam. Her sailings took her across the equator 50 times in 19 months.

On 10 July 1944 a United States Navy Martin PBM-3-D Mariner flying boat experienced an engine fire and made a forced landing in the ocean off Howland Island. The aircraft was beached by the pilot and although it was burned, the crew escaped unharmed and were rescued by Balsam.

Most of her wartime activities were in relatively quiet rear areas but on several occasions Balsam was in waters subject to Japanese air attack. She escaped unscathed, but on 21 July 1945 the nearby Liberty ship John A. Rawlins was hit by a kamikaze plane and set on fire. Balsam responded to fight the fire and also put aboard medical personnel to assist the wounded.

== Domestic service ==
After the war Balsam returned to San Francisco. Her maintenance of aids to navigation included servicing the Blunts Reef lightship. She towed lightship LV-100 back to port in November 1946.

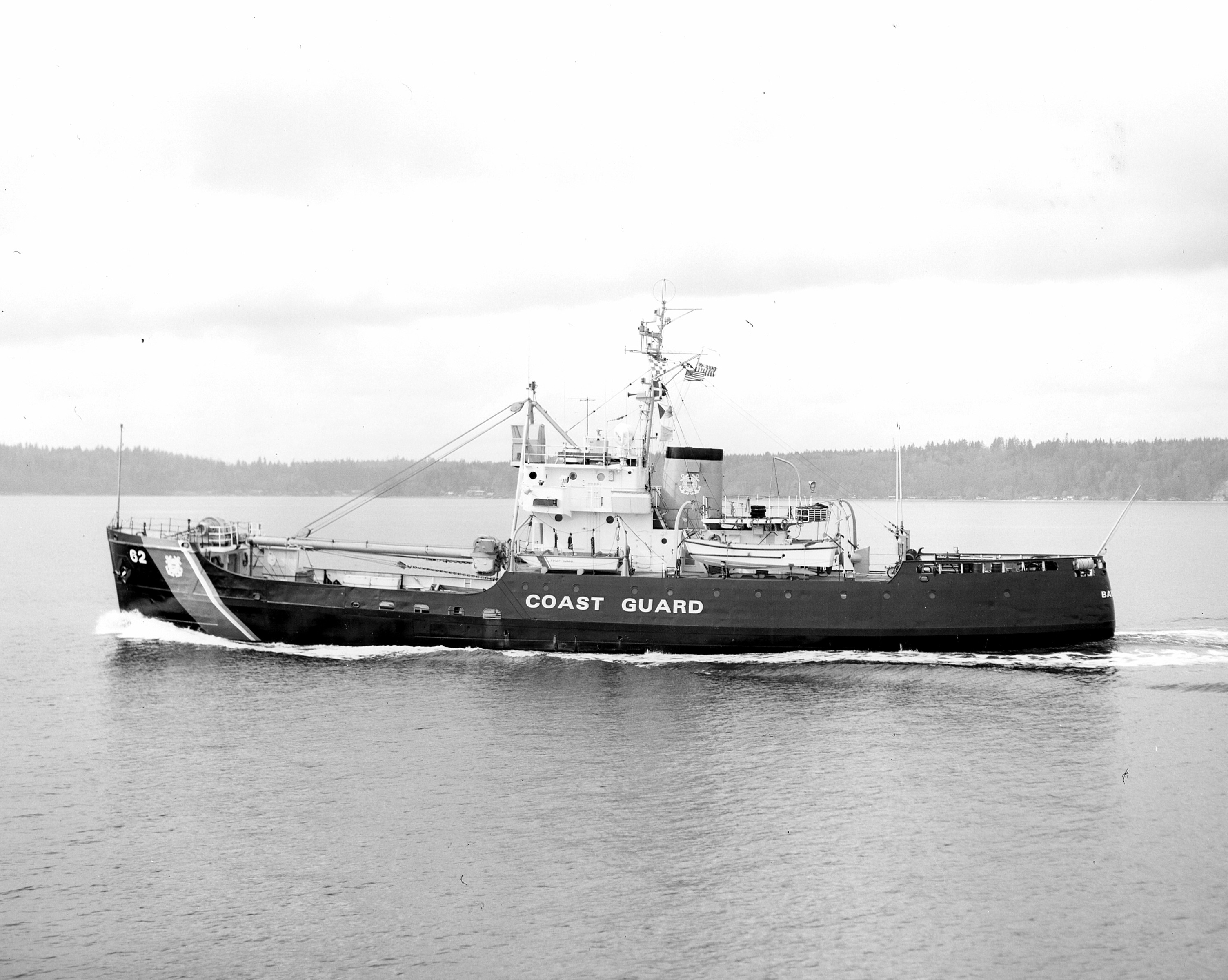
USCGC Balsam in 1973

In August 1947 Balsam was given a new home port at Astoria, Oregon. There she sank 18 derelict floating Japanese mines from November 1947 to April 1948. Balsam was also active in search and rescue missions. She rescued 6 crewmen from the fishing boat Fearless in February 1948 and another 10 crew from the sunken tug Neptune in November 1948. Two of Balsam's crew were awarded the Gold Lifesaving Medal for the latter rescue. In August 1948 Balsam was able to pull the grounded freighter Oliver Olson off a shoal in the Columbia River. In July 1950, she towed the disabled tuna fishing boat Susan 65 miles to Yaquina Bay, Oregon. The Columbia River froze in January 1950 and Balsam was dispatched for icebreaking to reopen the river to navigation. August 1951 saw Balsam assigned to a unique buoy tending project. She set the course for the first Gold Cup motorboat race in Seattle's Lake Washington.

On 15 September 1953 Balsam sailed from Astoria to her new home port, Eureka, California. She traded places with USCGC Yocona. The Coast Guard moved Yocona to the Columbia River to deal with large ocean-going ships. She had greater towing capacity than Balsam. Most of Balsam's officers and a third of her crew transferred to Yocona as part of the swap.

Balsam's primary mission at her new home port was search and rescue, but she shared the maintenance of aids to navigation in the area with USCGC Magnolia. She was involved in assisting numerous disabled fishing boats. In December 1954 she successfully pulled the freighter Groton Trails from a mud bank in Humboldt Bay.

In the summer of 1956 Balsam was dispatched to Barrow, Alaska for icebreaking duties to allow cargo ships to reach the Arctic coast. Instead of returning to Eureka in the fall, she sailed for her new homeport of Honolulu, Hawaii where she arrived in October. She spent the next six months maintaining aids to navigation and then returned to the Arctic for more icebreaking in the summer of 1957. The cargo shipments Balsam enabled were related to the construction of the Distant Early Warning Line sites in Barrow and surrounding areas. They were completed and activated in 1957. Balsam earned the Arctic Service Medal for both her deployments to Barrow.

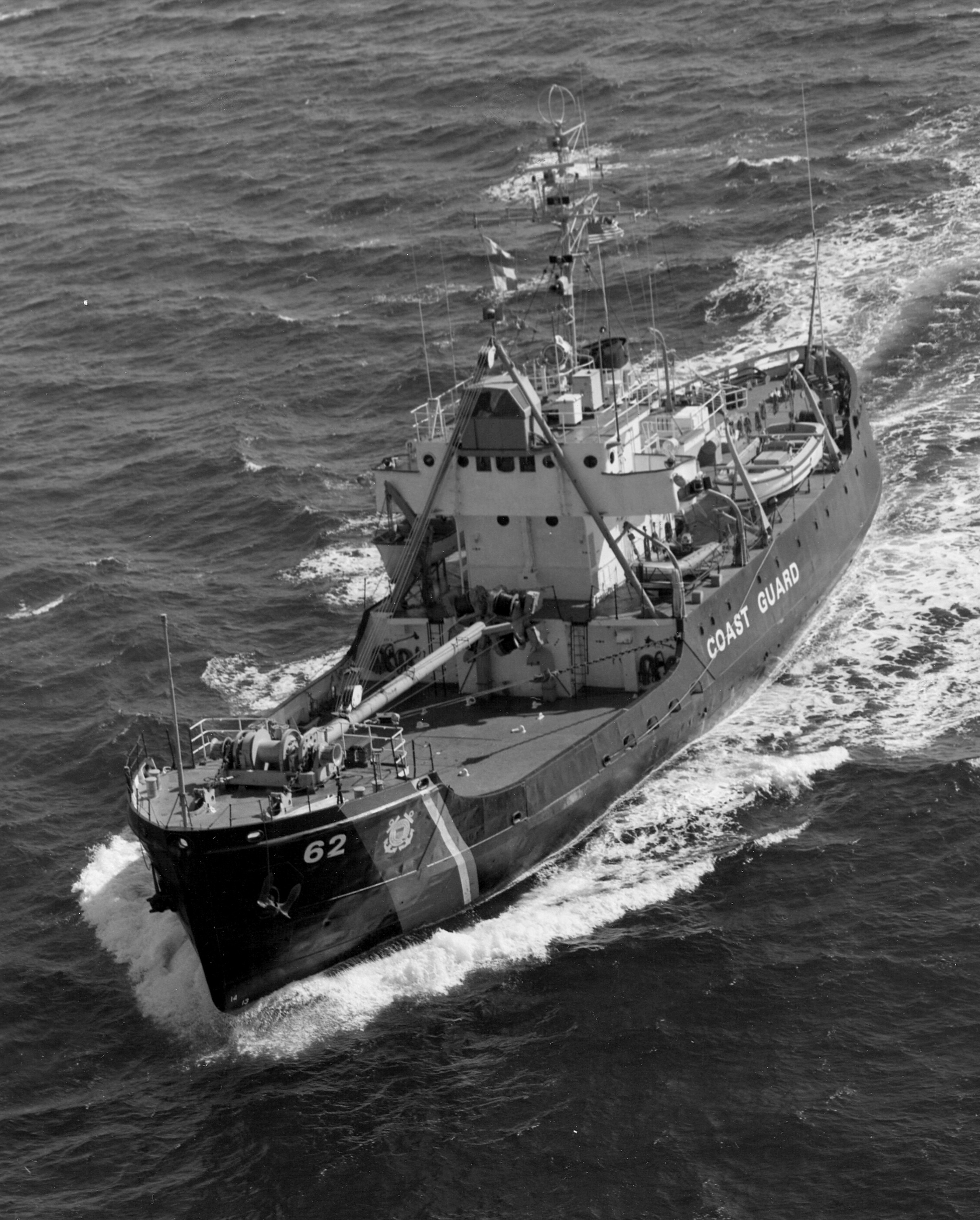
USCGC Balsam underway in April 1974

In February 1957, while based in Hawaii, Balsam made a 6,800-mile (10,900 km) round-trip to the South Pacific to deliver engine parts to the disabled United States Fish and Wildlife Service fisheries research vessel US FWS Hugh M. Smith.

On 20 June 1958 Balsam sailed from Honolulu for her new home port, Ketchikan, Alaska. She replaced USCGC Hemlock, which was decommissioned. Balsam stopped in Seattle en route.

In August 1964 Balsam swapped homeports with USCGC Clover and was assigned to Adak, Alaska. This change was made because Balsam had superior icebreaking capabilities. While her primary mission was maintaining aids to navigation, her position on edge of the United States waters involved her in a wide variety of events. In August 1965 she was directed to Big Diomede Island to return two Russians who had drifted across the Bering Strait. Once on board the ship, the men asked for asylum in the United States. In November 1966 the landing craft Bettles ran aground and broke up in gale with 65-mile-per-hour (105 km/h) winds off Semisopochnoi Island in the Aleutian Islands. She was carrying supplies for DEW line installations when she was wrecked. Balsam rescued her crew of eight men. Unusually bad winter weather cut off mail service to St. George Island in December 1967, so Balsam was pressed into service to deliver Christmas packages. Patrols to enforce fishery laws were an ongoing part of her responsibilities. In 1970 she and USCGC Yocona detained two South Korean fishing boats in violation of U.S. regulations. In 1972 she detained a Russian trawler which broke U.S. fishing regulations. In November 1972 Balsam assisted damage control parties when USCGC Jarvis went aground on Sedanka Island.

Balsam was decommissioned at the Puget Sound Naval Shipyard on 6 March 1975. Her crew was assigned to USCGC Ironwood, which had just completed a renovation at the Coast Guard Yard. They sailed Ironwood to Adak where they continued the duties previously undertaken by Balsam. The General Services Administration sold Balsam to a private company for $53,687 in September 1977.

Balsam earned a number of awards during her service with the Coast Guard including a Meritorious Unit Commendation.

== Commercial service ==
Balsam was converted into an Alaskan crab catcher-processor boat, and renamed Baranof. The conversion was done at a shipyard on the north shore of Lake Union in Seattle in 1978. The conversion took approximately eleven months. The ship was gutted and then rebuilt in its current form. Baranof has diesel fuel capacity of 85,000 US gallons (320,000 L; 71,000 imp gal), which would be sufficient for four months operation under ideal conditions. Her freshwater tanks can hold 25,000 US gallons (95,000 L; 21,000 imp gal) and these can be refilled by an onboard desalinization unit. A new bow thruster was installed, powered by a Caterpillar 3406 TAT engine. Two Caterpillar 353 TAT diesel generators were installed, each of which produces 300 kW of electrical power. A new main engine was installed as well, a Caterpillar 399 TAT engine that produced 1,200 hp (890 kW). The buoy deck was modified to carry as many as 233 king crab pots.

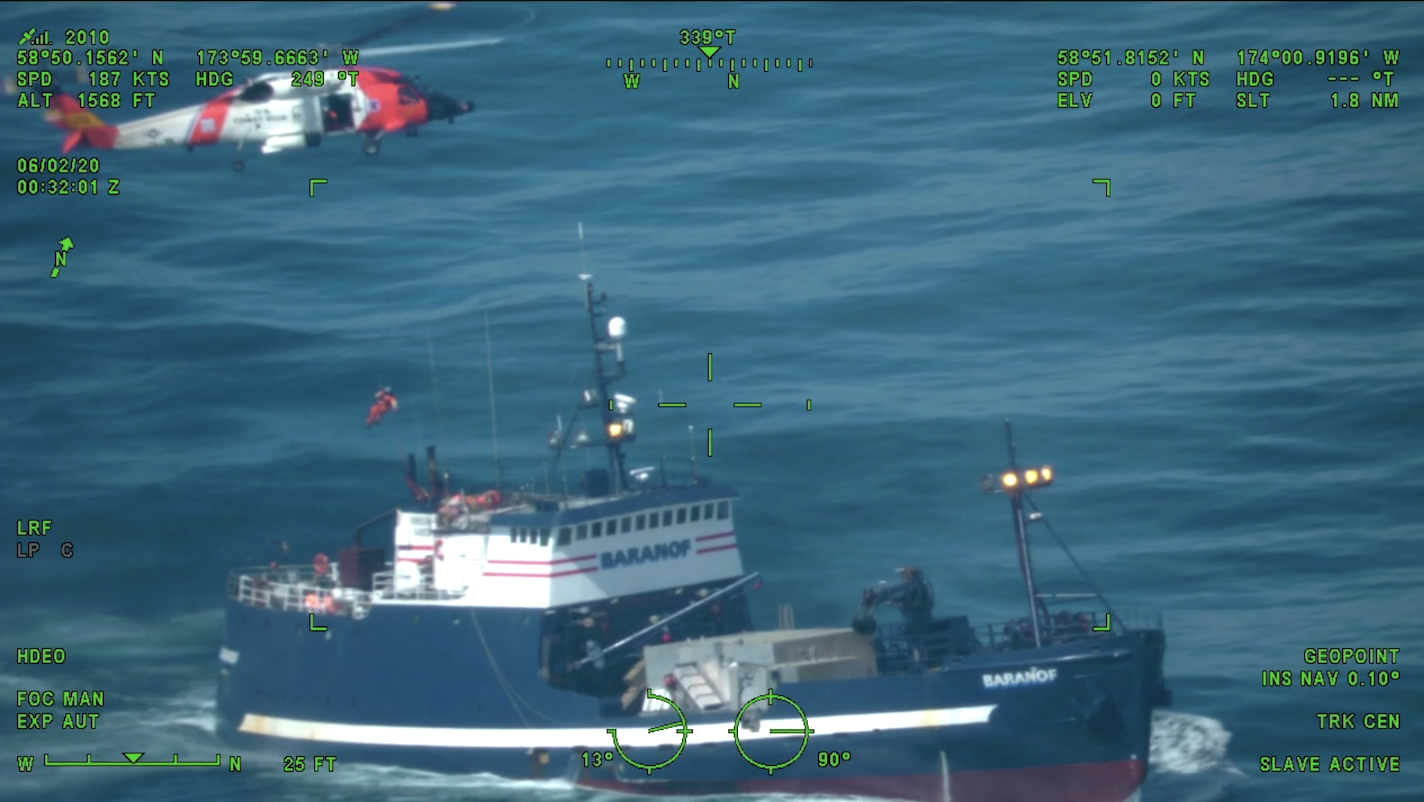
Medevac from Baranof (ex-USCGC Balsam) in the Bering Sea, 1 June 2020

Baranof is not equipped with a seawater tank to hold her catch. Instead, she has a complete processing facility to clean, cook, box, and freeze her catch. She is equipped to process 30,000 pounds (14,000 kg) of crab per day. When the king crab market went into decline in the early 1980s Baranof was also equipped for longline fishing of sablefish.

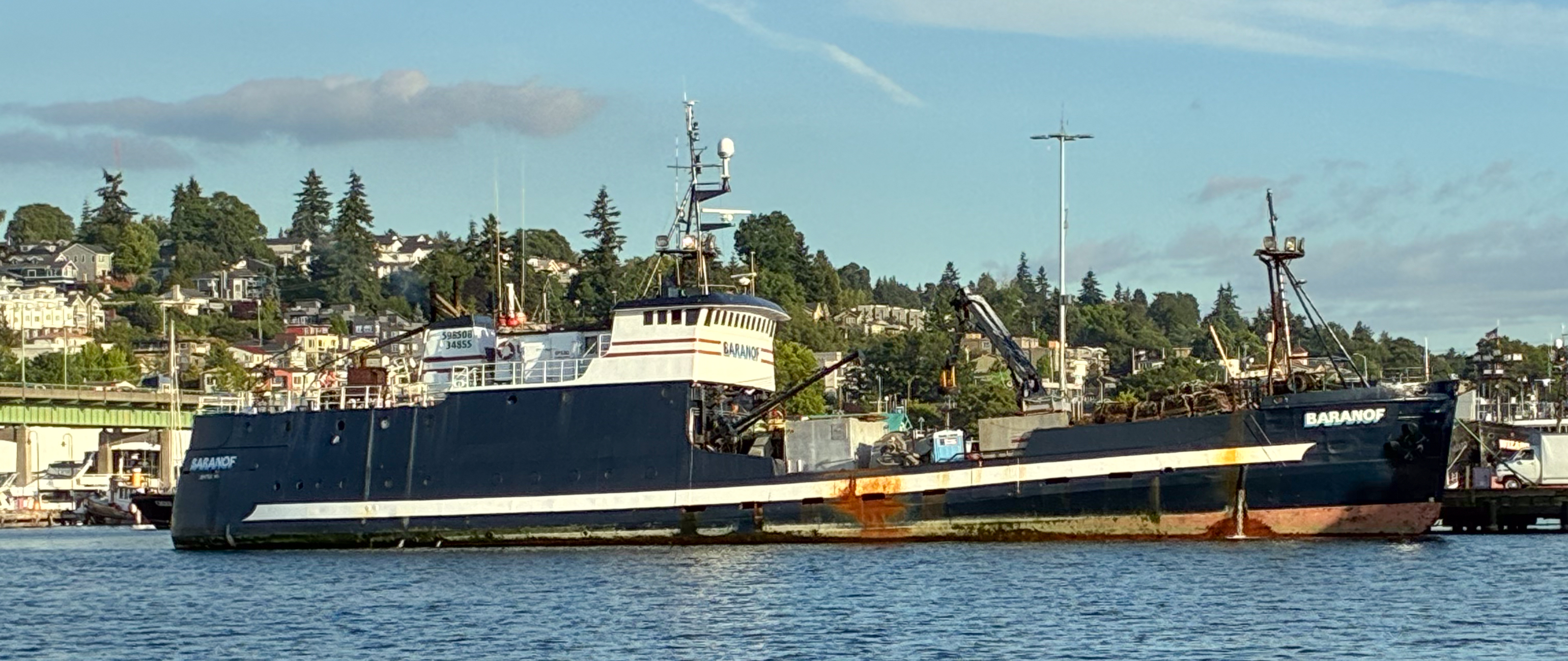
Baranof moored in Seattle in 2026

On 19 May 1981 Baranof was seized by the Alaska State Division of Fish & Wildlife Protection in Dutch Harbor. It alleged that Baranof's harvest of king crab in 1979 and 1980 had been unlawful because it violated Alaska regulations. Baranof's owners believed that the catch was lawful because, among other things, federal rather than state law applied to the offshore waters where the crabbing occurred. While the ship was released to her owners a week later, litigation over the matter went on for years finally reaching the Alaska Supreme Court. The court's decision in this case gave more power to the state to regulate fisheries beyond the 3-nautical-mile (5.6 km; 3.5 mi) territorial sea. Since the U.S. Supreme Court declined to hear an appeal of this case, the ruling on Baranof has had an impact on fisheries regulation nationwide.

Baranof went aground on the coast of Unalaska on 9 January 2012. Damage was limited to a 6-inch (15 cm) crack in the hull which was quickly patched allowing the ship to continue fishing. One crew member attributed the limited damage to the ship's ice-strengthened hull. In June 2020, in two separate incidents, the Coast Guard executed long-range helicopter evacuations of seriously ill Baranof crewmen.
