= USCGC Hemlock =

US Coast Guard lighthouse tender, 1934–1961

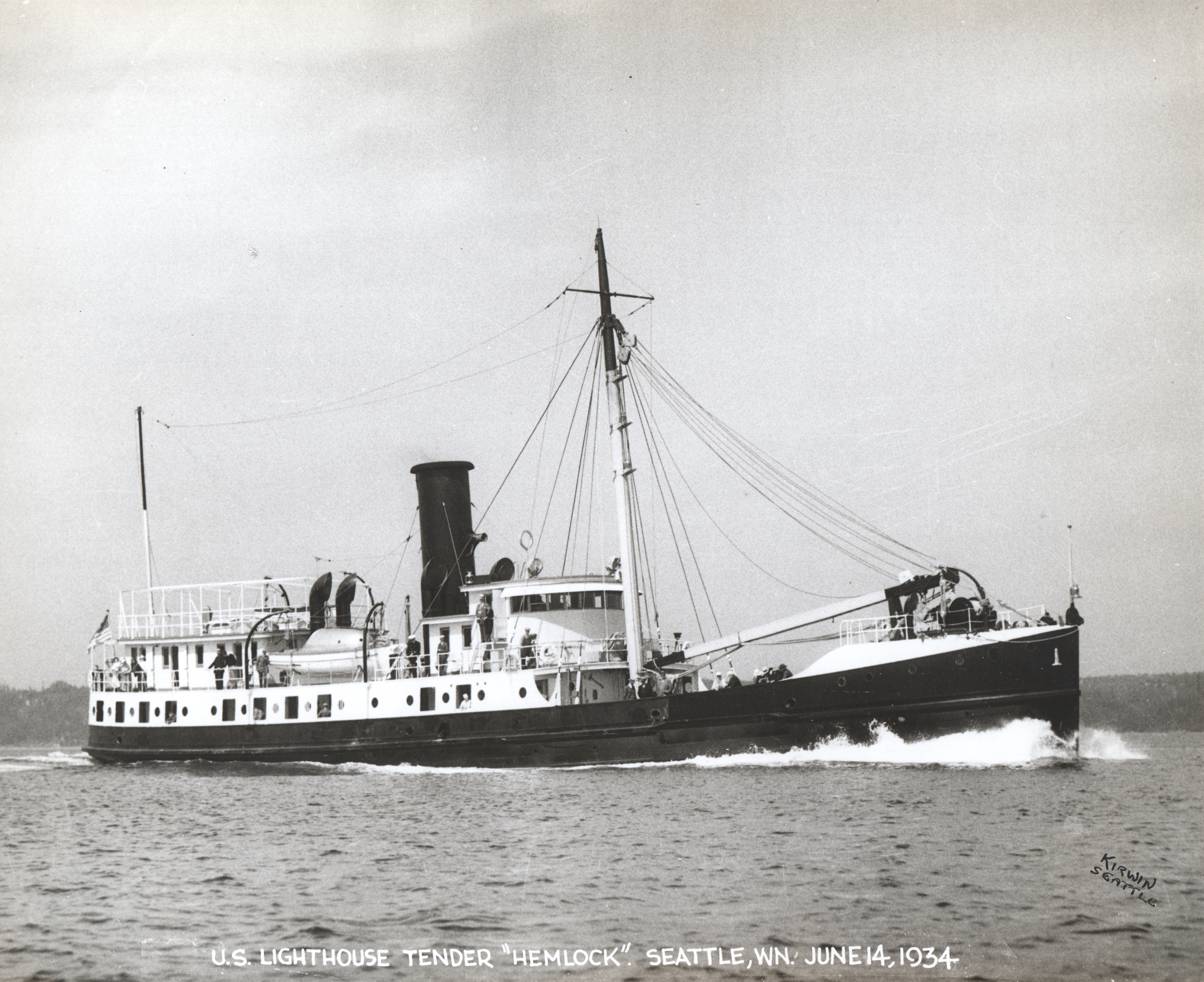
- USLHT Hemlock in 1934

History

United States Lighthouse Service
- Name: USLHT Hemlock
- Builder: Berg Shipbuilding Company
- Cost: $228,480
- Launched: 20 January 1934
- Home port: Ketchikan, Alaska
- Identification: Radio call sign: KCBK
- Fate: transferred to the United States Coast Guard

United States Coast Guard
- Name: USCGC Hemlock
- Acquired: 1 July 1939
- Decommissioned: 17 June 1958
- Home port: Ketchikan, Alaska
- Identification: Pennant number: WAGL-217; Radio Call Sign: NRYE
- Fate: Sold, August 2, 1961

General characteristics as built in 1934
- Displacement: 960 tons, fully loaded
- Length: 174.6 ft (53.2 m)
- Beam: 32 ft (9.8 m)
- Draught: 13.25 ft (4.04 m)
- Installed power: 1,000 bhp (750 kW)
- Propulsion: 2 screws
- Speed: 13 knots (24 km/h; 15 mph)
- Range: 1,836 miles (2,955 km)

USLHT Hemlock was a lighthouse tender built for the United States Lighthouse Service in 1934. She spent her entire government career stationed at Ketchikan, Alaska. Her primary missions were maintaining aids to navigation, and search and rescue. The Lighthouse Service was absorbed into the United States Coast Guard in 1939 and she became USCGC Hemlock (WAGL-217). During World War II, the Coast Guard came under U.S. Navy control and Hemlock was armed. She took on a number of military missions, but never saw combat. After the war she returned to her peacetime missions.

Hemlock was decommissioned in 1958, and sold in 1961. In 1965 her engines were removed and she was converted into a floating shrimp cannery. Renamed Pacific Pride, the processing barge was towed to Kodiak, Alaska where she worked for several years. Her ultimate fate is unknown.

== Construction and characteristics ==
Sealed bids for the construction of Hemlock were opened by the Commissioner of Lighthouses office on 29 November 1932. Berg Shipbuilding Company of Seattle was the lowest bidder, Pussey and Jones was next lowest, Bath Ironworks was third lowest, and three other bidders were higher. On 12 January 1933 the Commerce Department awarded a $228,480 contract for the construction of Hemlock to the Berg Shipbuilding Company.

Hemlock was designed by naval architect William C. Nikum of Seattle. Her hull was constructed of steel plates, riveted together. She was 174.6 feet (53.2 m) long overall (163.5 feet (49.8 m) between perpendiculars), with a beam of 32 feet (9.8 m). Her depth of hold was 14.5 feet (4.4 m). Her fully loaded draft was 13.25 feet (4.04 m). Her maximum displacement was 1005 tons, her full-load displacement 960 tons, and her light displacement was 770 tons.

Hemlock had two triple-expansion steam engines with high, medium, and low pressure cylinders of 12, 19, and 32 inches in diameter, with a stroke of 24 inches. Each of these engines generated 500 horsepower. These engines drove two 4-bladed propellers 7.25 feet (2.21 m) in diameter. Her engines were built by Washington Ironworks of Seattle. Steam for the engines was produced by two oil-fired boilers. Her maximum speed was reported as 13 knots.

Her fuel oil tanks had a capacity of 29,000 US gallons (110,000 L), which was large for the time, and reflected the long distances she was expected to steam in Alaska. She had a maximum unrefueled range of 1,836 miles (2,955 km).

Her complement in 1935, when she was commissioned, was 7 officers and 26 men.

United States lighthouse and buoy tenders were traditionally named for plants. Hemlock's namesake was the Hemlock tree, common in Southeast Alaska where she spent her government career.

Hemlock's construction was troubled. Berg was inexperienced in the construction of steel vessels of Hemlock's size and lacked the capability to produce major parts of the ship. It relied on subcontractors to produce these, and then assembled them. Andrew Berg, the company's president, disagreed with his own employees and the government inspector overseeing the construction on how to build the ship. He left the company in late 1933. Hemlock was finally delivered 238 days late, for which the company was assessed $38,000 in liquidated damages. Litigation around this contract went on for over a decade.

Hemlock was finally launched on 20 January 1934 from Berg's Ballard shipyard. She was christened by Lillian W. Tinkham, wife of Ralph R. Tinkham, superintendent of the 17th Lighthouse District. A crowd estimated at 2,000 people attended the launch. Builder's trials of the new ship took place in June 1934.

== U.S. Government service (1935–1961) ==
=== U.S. Lighthouse Service (1935–1939) ===
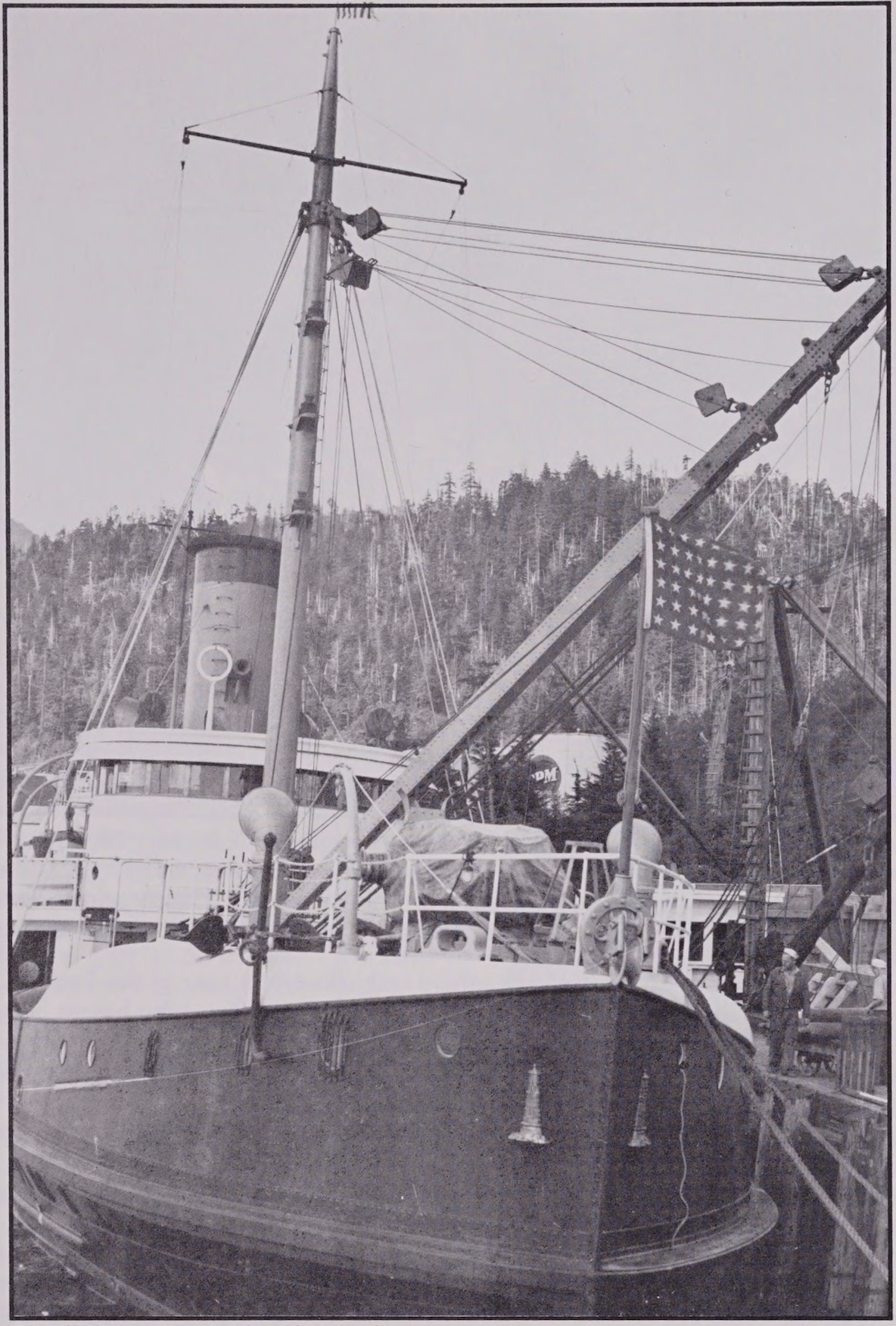
USLHT Hemlock

Hemlock was assigned to the 16th Lighthouse District. She replaced USLHT Fern at Ketchikan. Captain W. H. Barton, and Chief Engineer Ford Clark of Fern were transferred to Hemlock to take advantage of their local knowledge. She arrived in Juneau for the first time to begin her service in Alaska on 3 September 1934.

Her duties included maintaining the buoy fleet in her area, including relighting lights, recovering buoys that had gone adrift, and delivering food, fuel, supplies, and personnel to lighthouses.

Hemlock performed a number of search and rescue missions for various disabled fishing and pleasure boats, and one towing job for a sister Lighthouse Service Vessel. USLHT Cedar was tending the Poundstone Rock buoy in Lynn Canal when she smashed a propeller and bent the associated tail shaft on the bottom. Hemlock towed her back to Ketchikan for repairs in February 1938.

=== U.S. Coast Guard (1939–1961) ===
The U.S. Lighthouse Service was merged into the United States Coast Guard on 1 July 1939. Hemlock remained stationed in Ketchikan. She was classified as an "auxiliary vessel, lighthouse tender" by the Coast Guard and given the pennant number WAGL-217. As with the Lighthouse Service, her work was primarily in Southeast Alaska, but she occasionally maintained aids to navigation in Prince William Sound, and Kodiak.

Her crew in 1940 included a captain, first and second mates, a chief engineer and two assistants, and 31 enlisted men, a total complement of 37.

On 20 April 1940, Hemlock was sent to the aid of the steamer Mount McKinley, which had gone aground in Wrangell Narrows. The ship floated off at high tide without significant damage, so Hemlock's assistance was not required.

Due to the paucity of appropriate shipyard facilities in Alaska, Hemlock steamed south to Seattle for dry-docking in 1939, and 1940.

==== World War II ====
On 1 November 1941 President Roosevelt issued Executive Order 8929 transferring the U.S. Coast Guard from Treasury Department to United States Navy control. Hemlock remained based at Ketchikan, but came under the orders of the 13th and then, on 15 March 1944, the newly created 17th Naval District. The 17th Naval District became part of the Alaskan Sea Frontier a month later. In this new organization, Hemlock was assigned to Task Group 91.1, the Lighthouse and Buoy Tender Group of the Alaskan Sea Frontier.

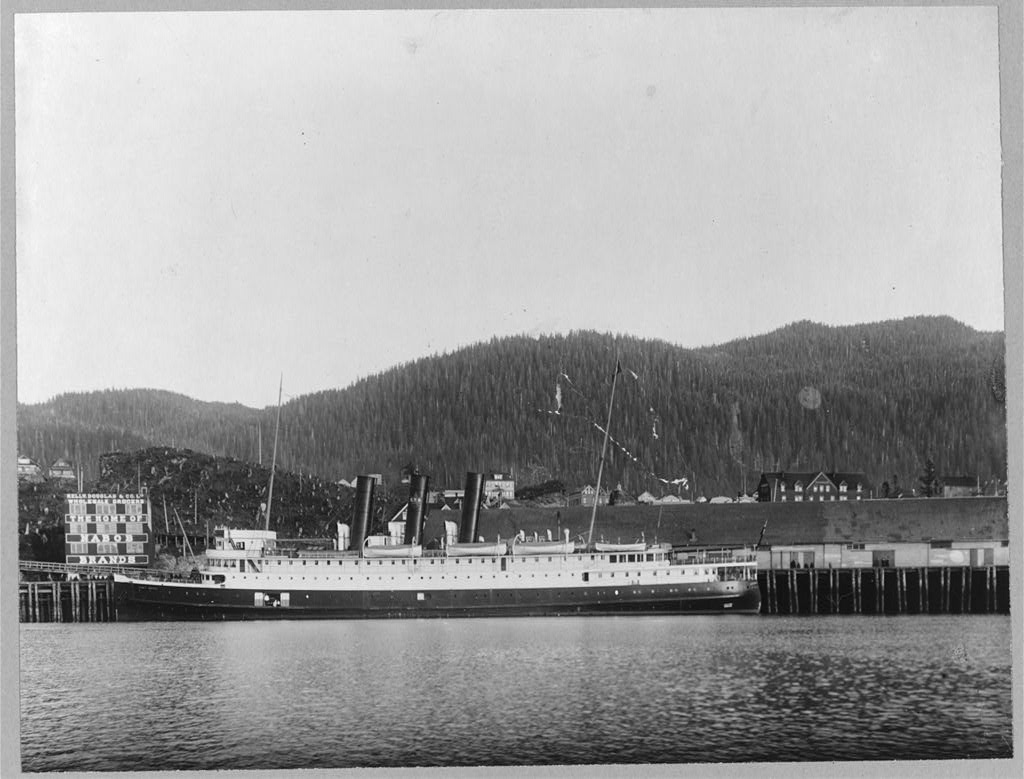
SS Prince Rupert, which Hemlock salvaged at Petersburg in October 1942

Hemlock continued her buoy tending duties during World War II, with some adjustments. While lighted buoys on the Inside Passage were maintained, some facing the Pacific and possible Japanese attack, such as those around Sitka, were extinguished. Buoys of primary use to pleasure and fishing boats were discontinued in favor of the routes used by war shipping. A new task for the ship was carrying ammunition to her lighthouses, which had become lookout stations. During September 1943, she carried the Coast Guard band and other entertainers from Ketchikan to Wrangell, Petersburg, Juneau, and back again as a morale building effort. Hemlock did not participate in any combat, but she did act as an anti-submarine escort for ships transiting Dixon Entrance.

The ship was significantly modified for wartime service. She was armed with two 3"/23 guns, four 20mm/80 guns, and two depth charge racks. Her crew was roughly doubled to service these weapons, and by 1945 had grown to 4 officers, 1 warrant officer, and 69 enlisted men.

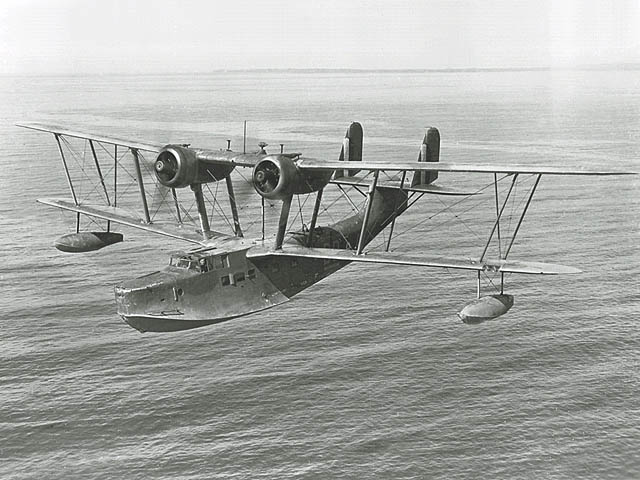
An RCAF Stranraer, similar to the plane salvaged by Hemlock in September 1943

On 13 January 1942, Hemlock was sent to the aid of the passenger steamer USAT David W. Branch, which had gone aground near Hammer Island, near the mouth of the Skeena River in British Columbia. In October 1942 the steamship Prince Rupert went aground on Prolewy Rocks at the north end of Wrangell Narrows. Her hull was holed in two places, she was listing badly, and there were concerns that she would be lost. Hemlock supported divers who installed a temporary patch which allowed Prince Rupert to proceed to permanent repairs.

A Royal Canadian Air Force Supermarine Stranraer flying-boat plane crashed in Tamgas Harbor on Annette Island, killing four of the fourteen people aboard. Hemlock was dispatched to the site on 26 September 1943 with four divers aboard. The divers were able to attached wire pennants to the sunken plane which Hemlock was then able to raise using her crane.

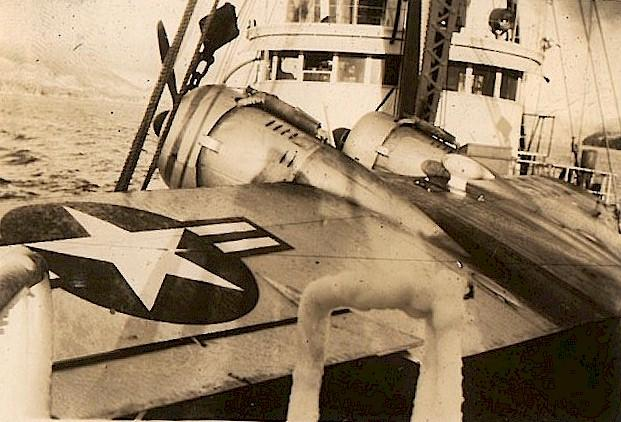
Hemlock transporting a Grumman Goose to Alaska on her foredeck c. 1943

USAT William L. Thompson went aground on Bold Island on 26 January 1944. Two holes were torn in her hull, and water flooded in at a rate of 18,000 gallons per minute. Hemlock provided pumps and other salvage equipment, and towed the stricken ship back to Ketchikan where temporary repairs were made. In February 1944 Hemlock assisted USCGC Citrus in refloating the freighter Mary D which had run aground on St. Albans Reef. The steamship F.W.S. Brandt went aground in Glacier Bay, and on 3 September 1944 Hemlock was sent to her assistance. The cutter was able to pull the ship into deeper water. On 13 November 1945 Hemlock was transiting Peril Strait when she was dispatched to Point Hayes on Chichagof Island to assist the tanker Illinois, which was aground on Morris Reef. Hemlock, USCGC Cyane, and several other vessels were able to haul the ship into deeper water.

In November 1942, Hemlock sailed from Ketchikan to Seattle to pick up supplies, and having delivered them returned to Seattle for overhaul and the installation of degaussing equipment. She was still in Seattle on 17 December 1942 when she towed USAT Texada to her berth in Elliot Bay. Hemlock returned to Ketchikan on 2 March 1943. On 20 December 1943 Hemlock arrived in Seattle from Ketchikan, likely for another cycle of annual maintenance. The ship repeated the trip to Seattle for dry-docking in 1945, departing Ketchikan on January 2, and returning in March.

==== Post-war ====
On 28 December 1945 President Truman issued Executive Order 9666 canceling Executive Order 8929 and returning the Coast Guard, including Hemlock, to Treasury Department control. All her armament was removed at the end of her naval career. Her crew was reduced to 2 officers, 4 warrant officers, and 41 men by 1957.

Hemlock continued her maintenance of aids to navigation, and search and rescue missions in the post-war period. She rescued the 6-man crew of the fishing vessel Attu which went aground near Mary Island in December 1947. In February 1948, Hemlock rescued three Coast Guard fliers who were forced down in Kashavaroff Passage when their plane developed an oil leak. In December 1948 the tug Chilcoot lost her rudder in a storm and was adrift. Hemlock towed her back to Ketchikan. Later that month, she rescued three crew from a boat that sank near Petersburg. In June 1950 she towed the halibut schooner Angeles into Ketchikan after she was disabled by engine trouble.

The ship continued to have her major maintenance done in Seattle shipyards. She had a major overhaul during the winter of 1950-1951 which was elongated by a machinists strike.

=== Obsolescence and sale ===
Hemlock was decommissioned on 17 June 1958. Her last commanding officer was Lieutenant Wayne E. Caldwell, who later rose to become a vice admiral and commander of the Atlantic Area and the 3rd Coast Guard District. Hemlock was replaced in Ketchikan by USCGC Balsam, of which Lieutenant Caldwell became executive officer.

The Coast Guard turned Hemlock over to the U.S. Maritime Administration for lay-up in the Pacific Reserve Fleet in Olympia, Washington on 6 April 1959. The ship was returned to Coast Guard custody on 27 October 1960. Hemlock was towed from Olympia to Seattle on the same day.

Hemlock was sold on 2 August 1961.

== Commercial operations ==
In January 1965 the firm of Sutterlin and Wendt announced that it had acquired Hemlock and was converting it into a floating shrimp processing plant. The company's plant in Seldovia had been damaged during the Good Friday earthquake and would be replaced by the processing plant aboard Hemlock. The conversion took place at the Tacoma Boatbuilding Company shipyard in Tacoma. The work was completed in May 1965, and the ship was renamed Pacific Pearl, for the brand of seafood she would produce. During the conversion, her engines and other machinery were removed to provide space for seafood processing. The conversion was reported to have cost $350,000.

Pacific Pearl was towed to a dock on Kodiak Island where she would connect to local power and water to begin processing. She could process 500 cases of shrimp of 24 cans each during an 8-hour shift. By 1966 she was reported to be producing 800 cases a day.

Neither Hemlock nor Pacific Pearl was ever Federally documented as a merchant ship, and the ultimate fate of the processing plant is unknown.
