= Nenana (steamer) =

American steamboat built in 1933

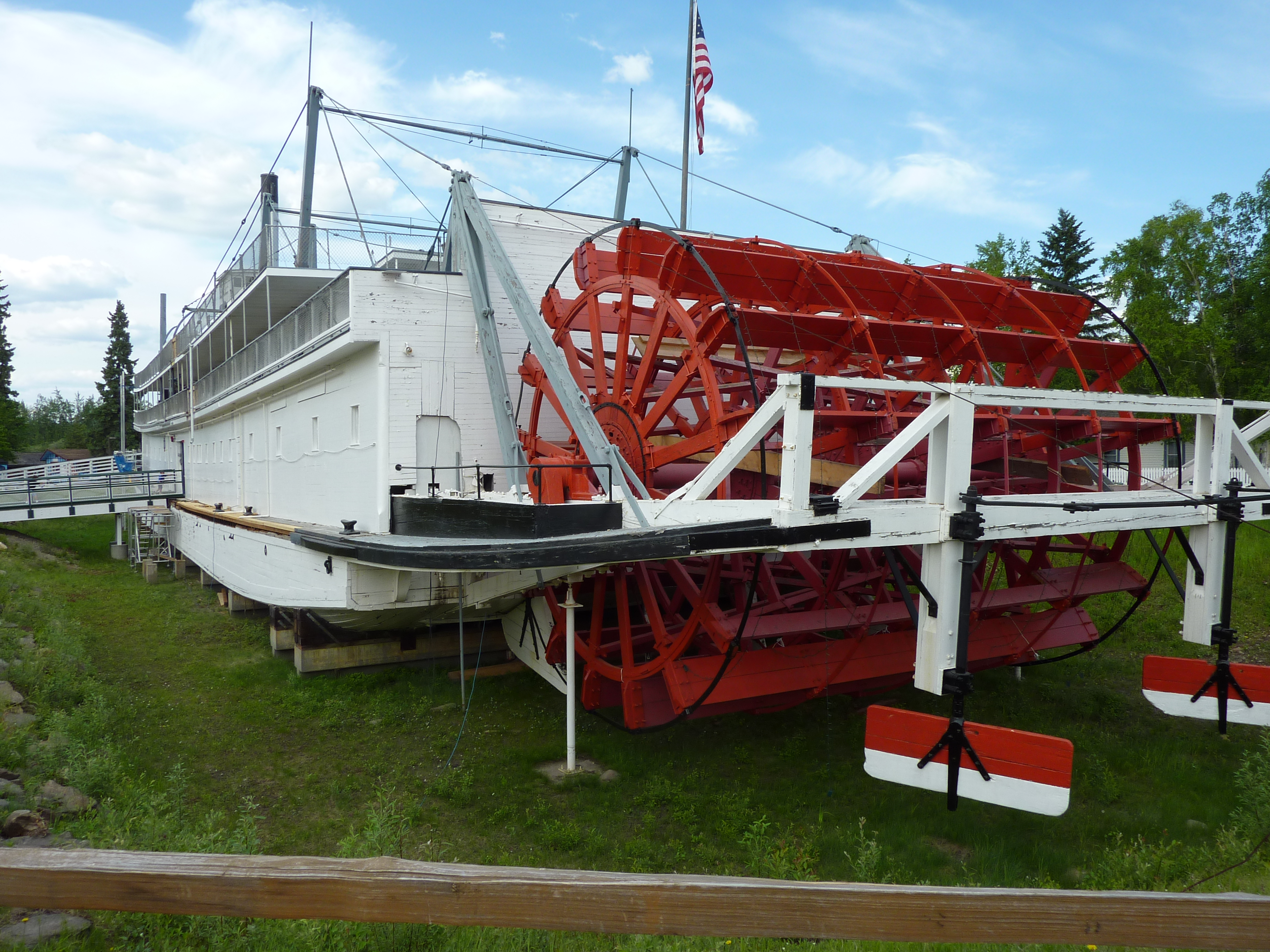
- Nenana, sternwheeler, in Pioneer Park, Fairbanks, 2011

History

United States
- Builder: Berg Shipbuilding Company
- Launched: 1933
- Out of service: 1957
- Status: Museum ship since 1965

General characteristics
- Tonnage: 1,000 gross register tons (GRT)
- Length: 237 ft (72 m) LOA
- Beam: 42 ft (13 m)
- Propulsion: Sternwheeler
- Nenana
- U.S. National Register of Historic Places
- U.S. National Historic Landmark
- Alaska Heritage Resources Survey
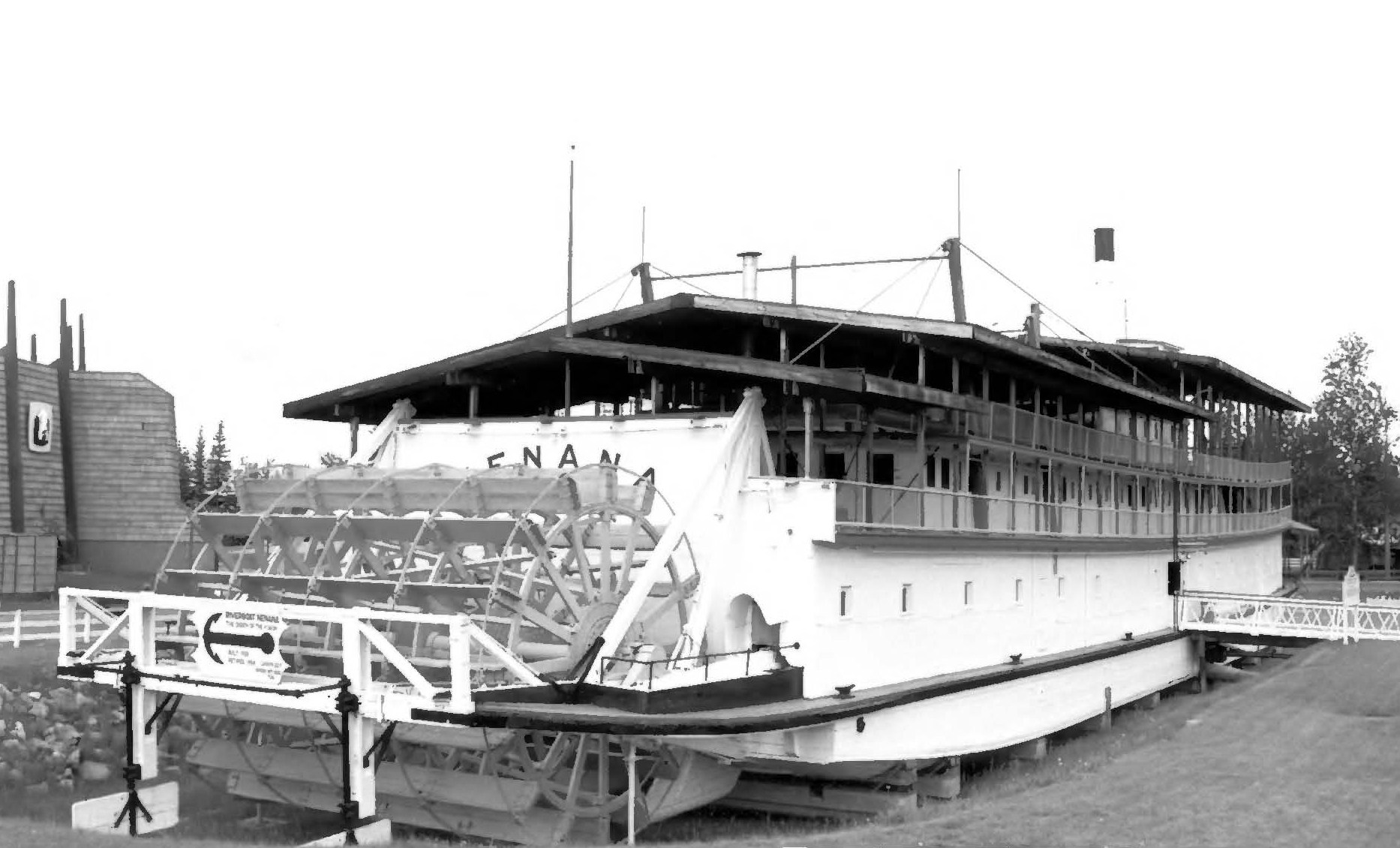
- S.S. Nenana in 1988

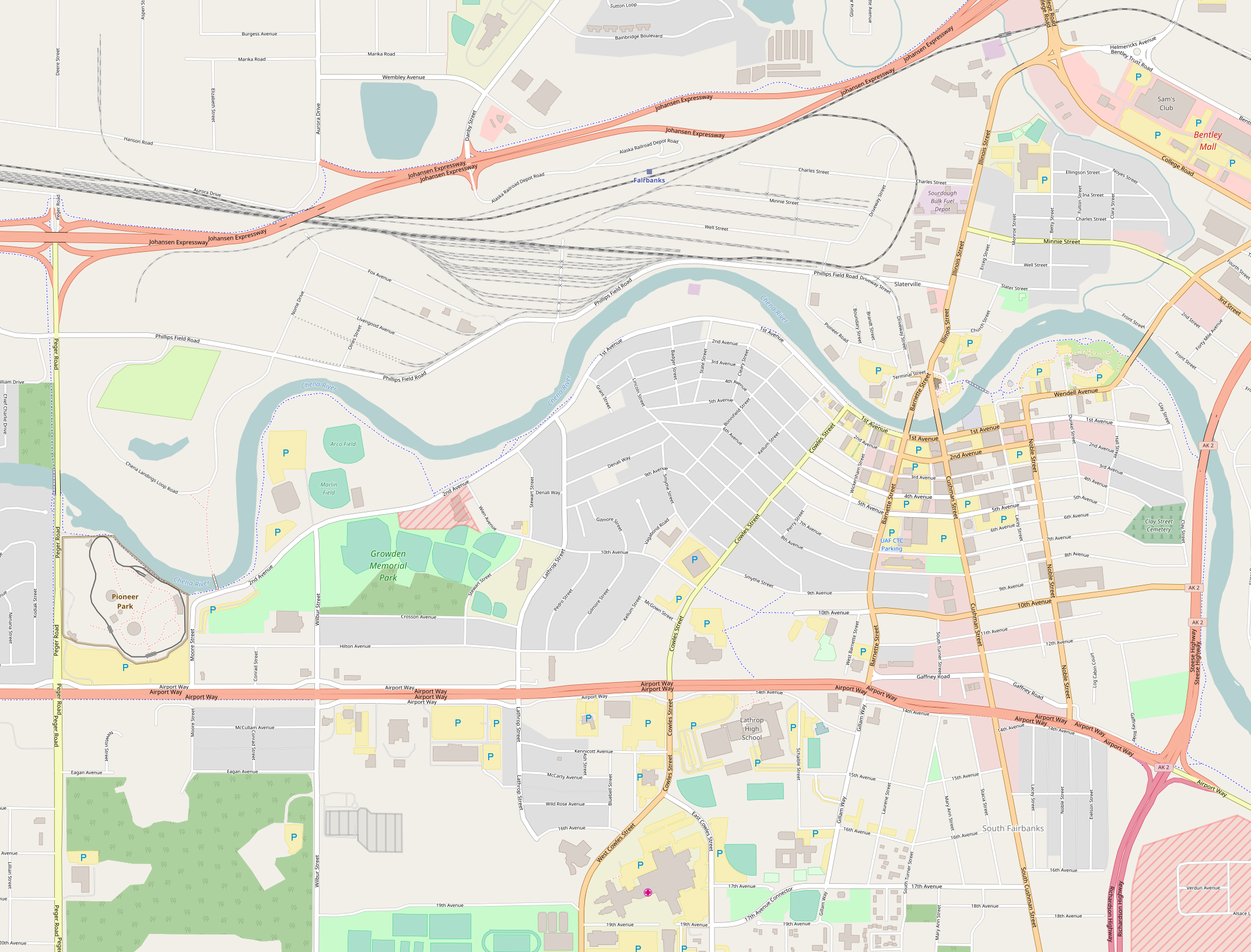
- Location within Downtown Fairbanks Location within Alaska
- Location: Pioneer Park, Fairbanks, Alaska
- Coordinates: 64°50′19″N 147°46′20″W
- Area: less than one acre
- Built: 1933
- Architect: Seattle Shipbuilding Company
- NRHP reference No.: 72001581
- AHRS No.: FAI-005

Significant dates
- Added to NRHP: 27 June 1972
- Designated NHL: 5 May 1989

SS Nenana is a five-deck (main or cargo, saloon, boat or hurricane, Texas, and pilothouse), western river, sternwheel paddleship. Two-hundred and thirty-seven feet in overall length, with a 42-foot beam, she was rated at 1,000 gross tons register. Nenana was built at Nenana, Alaska, and launched in May 1933. Marine architect W.C. Nickum of Seattle designed the sternwheeler, which was prefabricated in Seattle and put together at Nenana, Alaska, by Berg Shipbuilding Company. Nenana was built to serve as a packet. She could carry both passengers and freight. Nenana had accommodations for 48 passengers on her saloon deck. Up to 300 tons of freight, including two tons in cold storage, could be carried on her main deck. A Texas, topped by a pilothouse mounted forward in poolboat style, provided staterooms for a portion of the crew of 32. Nenana could push five or six barges on the Yukon River; but, because of sharp bends, only one on the Tanana River.

Fully laden, she drew three feet, six inches of water. World War II brought a military buildup in Alaska and kept Nenana busy. She supplied Galena Air Base from which fighter aircraft were supplied to the Soviet Union as well as transporting supplies to a number of military establishments in the advance defense system in Alaska. After the war ended, the decline in passenger revenues that had been arrested by the war continued. Alaska Railroad suspended all river passenger services after the 1949 season. At the close of the 1952 navigation season, Nenana was reconditioned at Whitehorse at a cost of $164,409.20. She only made one more trip north for the Alaska Railroad before being laid up until a newly formed company, Yutana Barge Lines, leased the entire Alaska Railroad fleet in 1954. Yutana Barge Lines operated Nenana to haul freight on rivers for one season but discontinued her lease at that time as unprofitable.

The General Services Administration called for bids on Nenana on December 10, 1955. All bids were rejected as too low until a group with associations to the Chamber of Commerce formed to bring Nenana to Fairbanks. This group, Greater Fairbanks Opportunities, Inc., purchased the steamboat, steamed her up the Tanana and Chena rivers to Fairbanks and opened her as a museum ship in 1957. For a time during a severe shortage of rooms, Nenana also operated as a hotel.

Weather, neglect, and souvenir hunters damaged Nenana at her berth on the river, and to protect, preserve, and interpret her the vessel was moved to a permanent protected dry berth in 1965. Nenana became the centerpiece of "Alaskaland", a historical park in Fairbanks. It was listed on the National Register of Historic Places in 1972. An extensive restoration program was begun to return her to her former glory. The latest phase of this work has rebuilt the bow and renewed her decks. She is the only surviving wooden ship of this type, and was for this reason declared a National Historic Landmark in 1989. Approximately 70 to 90 percent of her original materials remained at that time. From the exterior, the boat appears much as she did during her operating life. Although the interior, particularly the forward main deckhouse, saloon deckhouse, and Texas deckhouse, has been substantially altered, important features such as the engineroom remain intact. The ship was originally commissioned by the Alaska Railroad and provided freight transfer from the railroad yards at Nenana to villages along the Yukon and Tanana Rivers. This history is reflected within the park's current interpretative programs. She is currently preserved and displayed at Pioneer Park in Fairbanks, Alaska.

== See also ==
- Steamboats of the Yukon River
- List of National Historic Landmarks in Alaska
- National Register of Historic Places listings in Fairbanks North Star Borough, Alaska
